= Shiloh =

Shylo, Shiloh, or Shilo may refer to:

== In the Bible ==
- Shiloh (biblical city), an ancient city in Samaria
- Shiloh (biblical figure), a figure of contested meaning mentioned in the Hebrew Bible

== Arts and entertainment ==
=== Film and television ===
- Shiloh (film), a 1996 family movie based on the Naylor novel (see below)
- Shiloh, a chapter of The Civil War (miniseries) by Ken Burns
- Craig Shilo, a character in the television series Blue Mountain State
- Shiloh, the capital city in Kings (American TV series)
- Shiloh Ranch, the setting for the television series The Virginian
- Shilo Wallace, a character in the American rock horror opera film Repo! The Genetic Opera

=== Music ===
- Shiloh, an early band formed by Don Henley of the Eagles
- Shiloh (singer), former stage name of Canadian pop singer and songwriter Shiloh Hoganson (born 1993)
- Shiloh Dynasty, stage name of American indie singer Ciara Nicole Simms
- Shilo (album), a compilation album of songs recorded by Neil Diamond
- "Shilo" (song), written and recorded by Neil Diamond
- "Shiloh", a Christmas carol written by William Billings in 1781
- “Shiloh,” a song written and recorded by Buju Banton, from the album 'Til Shiloh
- “Shiloh,” a song by Canadian band The Dreadnoughts, from the album Into The North

=== In print ===
- Shiloh (franchise), a series of novels and film adaptations
  - Shiloh (Naylor novel), a 1991 children's novel
- Shiloh (Foote novel), a 1952 historical novel by Shelby Foote about the American Civil War battle
- "Shiloh," a short story by Bobbie Ann Mason - see Shiloh and Other Stories
- "Shiloh: A Requiem", an 1862 poem by Herman Melville published in Battle-Pieces and Aspects of the War

=== Video games ===
- Battleground 4: Shiloh, a 1996 computer game

== Military ==
- Battle of Shiloh, a major battle of the American Civil War
- USS Shiloh (1865), a Union Navy monitor
- USS Shiloh (CG-67), a United States Navy guided missile cruiser
- CFB Shilo, Manitoba, Canada, a Canadian Armed Forces base

== People ==
- Shiloh (given name), a unisex name and a list of people with the name
- Shilo (surname), a list of people

== Places ==
=== Israel ===
- Shilo (Israeli settlement), in the West Bank, established near the biblical site

=== United States ===
- Shiloh, DeKalb County, Alabama, a town
- Shiloh, Marengo County, Alabama, an unincorporated community
- Shiloh, Arkansas (disambiguation)
- Shiloh, Florida, a former village
- Shiloh, Georgia, a city
- Shiloh, Illinois, a village
- Shiloh, Indiana, an unincorporated town
- Shiloh, Kentucky, an unincorporated community
- Shiloh, Michigan, an unincorporated community
- Shiloh, Mississippi, a ghost town
- Shiloh, New Jersey, a borough
- Shiloh, Montgomery County, Ohio, a census-designated place
- Shiloh, Richland County, Ohio, a village
- Shiloh, York County, Pennsylvania, a census-designated place
- Shiloh, Sumter County, South Carolina, a census-designated place
- Shiloh, Tennessee (disambiguation)
- Shiloh, Texas (disambiguation)
- Shiloh, Virginia (disambiguation)
- Shiloh, West Virginia (disambiguation)
- Shiloh Township (disambiguation)
- Shiloh Creek, a stream in Kansas and Missouri
- Shiloh Historic District, Springdale, Arkansas
- Shiloh National Military Park, preserving the Shiloh and Corinth battlefields

=== Elsewhere ===
- Shilo, a community in the township of Centre Wellington, Ontario, Canada
- Shilan, Gilan, Iran, a village also known as Shilo

== Religious institutions ==
- Shiloh Church (disambiguation)
- Shiloh Temple, a Christian facility in Maine on the National Register of Historic Places
- Shiloh Youth Revival Centers, a movement of hippy-style rescue missions founded in 1968 and dissolved in 1989
- Shiloh, a farm and retreat site in Iowa associated with The Living Word Fellowship Christian cult
- Shiloh Communities, Shiloh Trust, and Shiloh Church, one of the oldest continuously-operating communes in the United States, in Sulphur Springs, Arkansas

== Schools in the United States ==
- Shiloh College, Shiloh Hill, Illinois, a former teachers' college and later public school, on the National Register of Historic Places
- Shiloh High School (disambiguation)
- Shiloh Middle School, Parma, Ohio
- Shiloh School, a historic one-room school building near Kilmarnock, Virginia, on the National Register of Historic Places
- Shiloh Christian School, Springdale, Arkansas, a private school

== Other uses ==
- Shiloh House (disambiguation), several buildings on the National Register of Historic Places
- Shilo Inns, an American hotel chain
- Shiloh Museum of Ozark History, Springdale, Arkansas
- Shiloh Orphanage, a former orphanage for black children in Augusta, Georgia, on the National Register of Historic Places
- Shiloh Wind Power Plant, Montezuma Hills, California

== See also ==
- Silo (disambiguation)
