= Israel Institute for Oceanographic and Limnological Research =

Israeli research institute

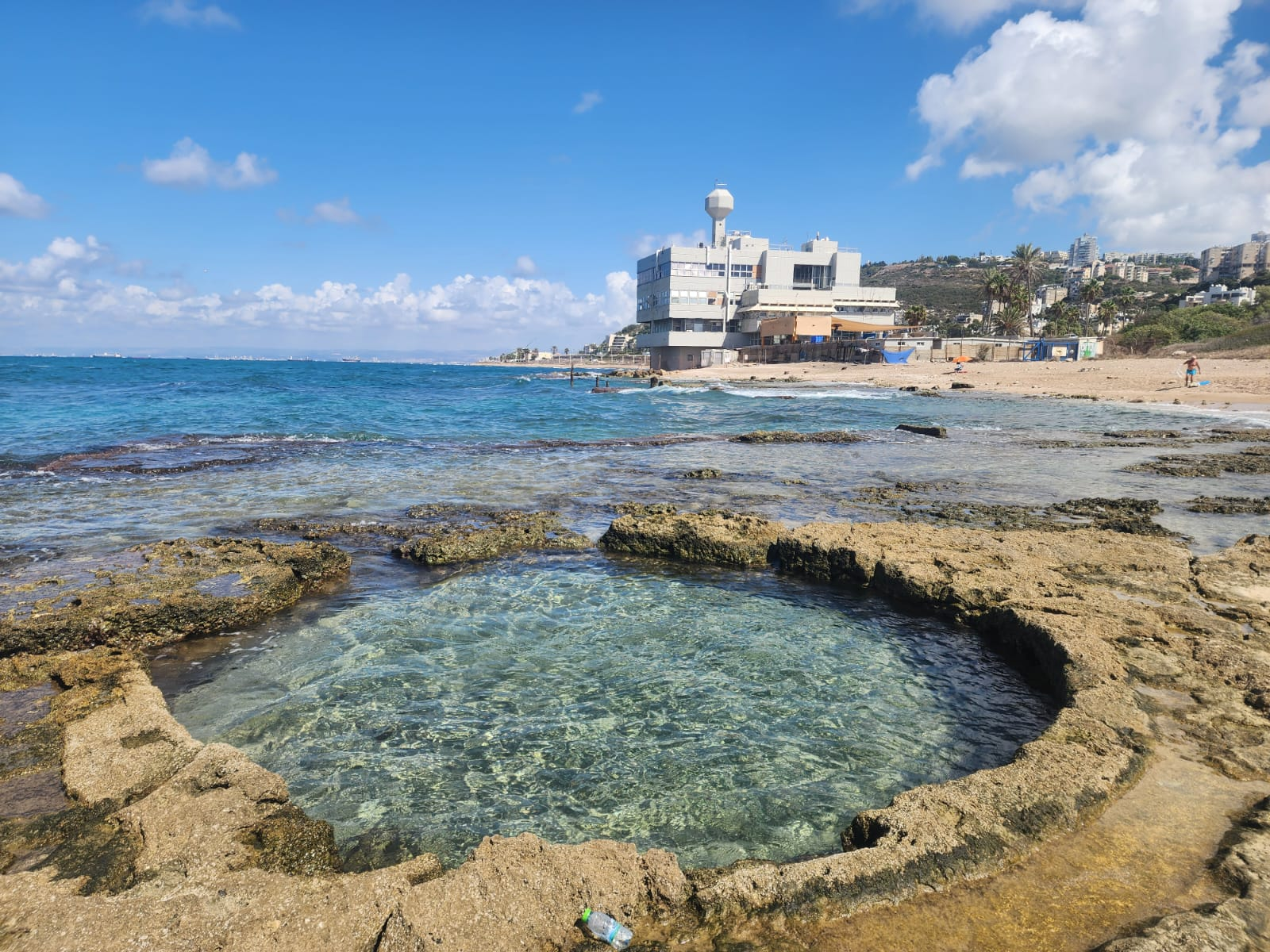
The building of the Israel Institute for Oceanography and Limnology in Tel Shikmona Beach in Haifa, designed by architect David Yanai in the brutalist style.

Israel Oceanographic and Limnological Research (IOLR) (Hebrew: חקר ימים ואגמים לישראל) is a government company and the national research institute. The company was officially established in 1967 to create a database of knowledge for the sustainable use and protection of Israel’s marine, coastal and aquatic resources.

IOLR engages in research and development in marine sciences (oceanography), lake sciences (limnology), and aquaculture. IOLR operates within the framework of the research institutes affiliated with the Directorate of Research for Earth sciences in the Ministry of National Infrastructures.

IOLR includes three research institutes:

- The National Institute of Oceanography (NIC; located near Tel Shikmona, near the Ein Hayam neighborhood in Haifa) in a building designed by architect David Yanai.
- The Yigal Alon Kinneret Limnological Institute (KLL; Lake Kinneret – Limnology – located at the Sapir site, on the shores of the Sea of Galilee)
- The National Mariculture Center (NMC; Mariculture and Marine Biotechnology located in Eilat)

In addition, in the Haifa unit (NIC), educational programs are delivered to children and high school teens to make science accessible and bring young people closer to the scientific world, via cutting-edge marine research.

== History ==
Israel Oceanographic and Limnological Research was established following the recommendation of a committee headed by Prof. Moshe Shiloh, which recommended that all marine research be concentrated under one government institute. The company was founded in August 1966 by Major General (retd.) Yochai Ben Nun, and the building of the National Institute of Oceanography near Tel Shikmona in Haifa is named after him. In February 1967, a research station in Eilat and the Kinneret Limnological Laboratory at the Sapir site were opened as branches of the institute. In 1969, it was decided to build the institute's building on the coast of Shikmona, with joint funding from philanthropist Shmuel Lunenfeld and the Israeli government. The building was inaugurated in 1976.

IOLR CEO's
Years	Name
1967-1982	Major General (retd.) Yochai Ben-Nun
1982-1988	Dr. Colette Tzruya
1988-2005	Dr. Yuval Cohen
2005-2022	Prof. Barak Herut
2022-Today	Mr. Alon Zask

== Research and development activity ==
IOLR focuses on research, monitoring, assessment and prediction of the state of the sea areas adjacent to the State of Israel (the Eastern Mediterranean and the Gulf of Eilat) and its inland waters (the Sea of Galilee and the Dead Sea) and of the environmental problems in these aquatic bodies. The research effort in the fields of aquaculture and biotechnology focuses on developing technologies for using marine organisms as a source of food and biochemicals. This diverse activity of research, environmental monitoring, and biotechnological developments combines many scientific disciplines, including physics, chemistry, biology, geology, and ecology, and is carried out in collaboration with universities and research institutes in Israel and around the world.

IOLR participates in regional and global research and monitoring programs, assists developing countries in its fields of expertise, and represents Israel in the Intergovernmental Oceanographic Commission (IOC/UNESCO) and in the Mediterranean Science Commission(CIESM).

IOLR focuses on three main objectives:

- Sea and coasts – Development of scientific tools to support decision-making on the use and conservation of Israel's marine environment and its resources.
- The Kinneret Lake (Sea of Galilee)– Development of scientific tools to support decision-making on the operation of the Sea of Galilee in the national water supply system while maintaining the quality of its water.
- Aquaculture and Biotechnology – Development of a scientific-technological infrastructure for the aquaculture sector in Israel and for related biotechnological industries.

== Professional capabilities and resources ==
IOLR research institutes have professional capabilities and research means that include: research vessels in the Mediterranean Sea and the Sea of Galilee, equipment for marine mapping and data collection in the sea and the Sea of Galilee, analytical laboratories, and experimental systems with flowing seawater. The National Institute of Oceanography houses the National Marine Information Center, which centralizes, documents, and disseminates data and information on Israel's marine environment.

=== Institute's research ships and boats ===
- RV Bat Galim
- RV Shikmona (1967-2016)
- RV Etziona (1970-?)
- Shachaf boat
- Galit boat
- Adva boat
- Hermona boat
- Lilian boat

=== Professional services ===
IOLR Provides diverse services in its areas of expertise, including conducting marine surveys and laboratory tests, seabed mapping, environmental monitoring and preparation of environmental impact assessments, and professional consulting.

== See also ==
- Geological Survey of Israel
