= Shilo (surname) =

Shilo is a surname. Notable people with the surname include:

- Andrey Shilo (born 1976), Belarusian former footballer
- Maksim Shilo (born 1993), Belarusian footballer
- Margalit Shilo (born 1942), Israeli historian
- Moshe Shilo (1920–1990), Israeli aquatic microbiologist
- Ronen Shilo (born 1958), Israeli entrepreneur and software engineer
- Rostislav Shilo (1940–2016), Soviet and Russian director of the Novosibirsk Zoo and politician
- Shmuel Shilo (1929–2011), Israeli actor, director and producer
