= Silo (disambiguation) =

A silo is a structure for storing bulk materials.

Silo or SILO may refer to:

== Arts and entertainment ==
- Silo (film), a 2019 American thriller drama film
- Silo (series), a series of science fiction novellas by Hugh Howey
  - Silo (TV series), a television series adapted from the novellas
- A title character of Sam and Silo, an American comic strip that ran from 1977 to 2017

== Computing ==
- Information silo, data storage method
- SILO (boot loader), used in Linux
- Silo (library), a data file format and library for scientific model data
- Silo (software), a 3D modeling software

== People ==
- Abronius Silo, 1st century BC Latin poet
- Quintus Poppaedius Silo (died 88 BC), leader of the Italian tribe of the Marsi
- Silo of Asturias, king of Asturias (in Spain) from 774 to 783
- Mario Rodríguez Cobos (1938–2010), Argentine writer and founder of the Humanist Movement also known as Silo
- Adam Silo (1674–1760), Dutch painter
- Susan Silo (born 1942), American actress
- Talal Silo (born 1965), Syrian Turkmen defector

== Places ==
- Silo, Oklahoma, a town in the United States
- Šilo, a village in Croatia
- Silo Canal, Brandenburg, Germany
- The Silo (Copenhagen), Denmark

== Businesses and companies ==
- Silo (store), an American chain of retail electronics stores
- Silo Theatre, a New Zealand theatre production company
- The Silo, a Lesotho agricultural newspaper
- Silo (restaurant), a zero-waste restaurant in London

== Zoology ==
- Silo (insect), a genus of insects in the order Trichoptera
- Roy and Silo, a chinstrap penguin pair

== Other uses ==
- Silo High School, Durant, Oklahoma, United States
- School Infrastructure Local Option, a sales tax in Iowa, United States
- Missile silo, an underground missile launching facility
- Information silo, a management system incapable of reciprocal operation with other, related management systems
- Silastic silo, used to treat abdominal wall defects

== See also ==
- Shilo (disambiguation)
