= Shiloh, Virginia =

Shiloh is the name of some places in the State of Virginia in the United States of America:

- Shiloh, Bath County, Virginia
- Shiloh, King George County, Virginia
- Shiloh, Pulaski County, Virginia
- Shiloh, Southampton County, Virginia
- Shiloh, Stafford County, Virginia
- Shiloh, Wythe County, Virginia
