= Shiloh Township, Illinois =

Shiloh Township may refer to one of the following places in the State of Illinois:

- Shiloh Township, Edgar County, Illinois
- Shiloh Township, Jefferson County, Illinois
- Shiloh Valley Township, St. Clair County, Illinois

See also

- Shiloh Township (disambiguation)
