= Shiloh House =

Shiloh House may refer to:

- Shiloh House (Sulphur Springs, Arkansas), listed on the National Register of Historic Places (NRHP) in Benton County
- Shiloh House (Zion, Illinois), NRHP-listed in Lake County
- Shiloh House (Benton Harbor, Michigan), NRHP-listed in Berrien County
- Shiloh Youth Revival Centers, a 1970's Jesus People communal movement with 175 associated "Shiloh Houses."

== See also ==
- Shiloh Church (disambiguation)
- Shiloh Baptist Church (disambiguation)
