= Young America Township, Edgar County, Illinois =

Young America Township
- Township
- Location in Edgar County

- Edgar County's location in Illinois
- Coordinates: 39°50′21″N 87°50′43″W
- Country: United States
- State: Illinois
- County: Edgar
- Established: November 4, 1856

Area
  - Total: 55.21 sq mi (143.0 km^{2})
  - Land: 55.21 sq mi (143.0 km^{2})
  - Water: 0 sq mi (0 km^{2}) 0%
- Elevation: 663 ft (202 m)

Population (2020)
  - Total: 605
  - Density: 11.0/sq mi (4.23/km^{2})
- Time zone: UTC-6 (CST)
  - Summer (DST): UTC-5 (CDT)
- ZIP codes: 61810, 61876, 61917, 61924, 61932, 61940, 61942
- FIPS code: 17-045-84064

Young America Township is one of fifteen townships in Edgar County, Illinois, USA. As of the 2020 census, its population was 605 and it contained 318 housing units.

== History ==
In the early 19th century, the current Young America township and the current Shiloh Township comprised a single township, known as Bull Head Township.

== Geography ==
According to the 2021 census gazetteer files, Young America Township has a total area of 55.21 square miles (142.99 km^{2}), all land.

=== Cities, towns, villages ===
- Hume (vast majority)
- Metcalf

=== Extinct towns ===
- Hildreth
- McCown
- Palermo

=== Cemeteries ===
The township contains Young America Cemetery. The Young America Cemetery Association was organized in 1896, with forty shares of stock sold to purchase the grounds. The first interment in the cemetery was Byron Stark, 5 years of age, who died 26 June 1896. In 1898, the Association's stockholders asked the village of Hume to take over the cemetery and its debts, but the village refused. In April 1960, the voters of Young America Township voted to support the cemetery. The current tool house and flagpole were erected in 1960.

=== Major highways ===
- US Route 36
- Illinois Route 49

=== Airports and landing strips ===
- Hildreth Air Park
- Richardson Landing Strip

== Demographics ==
As of the 2020 census there were 605 people, 371 households, and 275 families residing in the township. The population density was 10.96 inhabitants per square mile (4.23/km^{2}). There were 318 housing units at an average density of 5.76 per square mile (2.22/km^{2}). The racial makeup of the township was 94.21% White, 0.66% African American, 0.17% Native American, 0.17% Asian, 0.00% Pacific Islander, 0.17% from other races, and 4.63% from two or more races. Hispanic or Latino of any race were 1.65% of the population.

There were 371 households, out of which 28.80% had children under the age of 18 living with them, 63.61% were married couples living together, 7.82% had a female householder with no spouse present, and 25.88% were non-families. 21.60% of all households were made up of individuals, and 10.20% had someone living alone who was 65 years of age or older. The average household size was 2.28 and the average family size was 2.65.

The township's age distribution consisted of 21.5% under the age of 18, 8.5% from 18 to 24, 18.7% from 25 to 44, 29.8% from 45 to 64, and 21.5% who were 65 years of age or older. The median age was 46.5 years. For every 100 females, there were 116.4 males. For every 100 females age 18 and over, there were 122.8 males.

The median income for a household in the township was $50,913, and the median income for a family was $56,696. Males had a median income of $42,708 versus $25,433 for females. The per capita income for the township was $25,654. About 9.1% of families and 14.4% of the population were below the poverty line, including 19.8% of those under age 18 and 1.1% of those age 65 or over.

Historical population
Census	Pop.	Note	%±
2010	726		—
2020	605		−16.7%
U.S. Decennial Census

== School districts ==
- Heritage Community Unit School District 8
- Jamaica Community Unit School District 12
- Shiloh Community Unit School District 1

== Political districts ==
- Illinois's 15th congressional district
- State House District 110
- State Senate District 55
