= Shiloh Church =

Shiloh Church may refer to:

- Shiloh Church (Springdale, Arkansas), listed on the National Register of Historic Places (NRHP) in Washington County
- Shiloh Communities, Shiloh Trust, and Shiloh Church, one of the oldest continuously-operating communes in the United States, in Sulphur Springs, Arkansas
- Shiloh Meeting House and Cemetery, Ireland, Indiana, NRHP-listed in Dubois County
- Shiloh Primitive Baptist Church, NRHP-listed in Johnston County, North Carolina, near Brogden, North Carolina
- Shiloh Church (Newport, Rhode Island), NRHP-listed in Newport County
- Shiloh Methodist Church, in Inman, South Carolina, NRHP-listed in Spartanburg County
- Shiloh Church, a landmark in the Battle of Shiloh

== See also ==
- Shiloh Community Church in Manchester, New Hampshire
- Shiloh Baptist Church (disambiguation)
- Shiloh Temple, Lisbon Falls, Maine
- Mount Shiloh Missionary Baptist Church, New Bern, North Carolina
