= Shiloh Baptist Church =

Shiloh Baptist Church may refer to:

in the United States (by state)

- Shiloh Baptist Church disaster, a stampede at a church in Birmingham, Alabama
- Shiloh Baptist Church (Sacramento, California), listed on the National Register of Historic Places (NRHP) in Sacramento County
- Shiloh-Marion Baptist Church and Cemetery, Buena Vista, Georgia, listed on the NRHP in Marion County
- Shiloh Primitive Baptist Church, Brogden, North Carolina, listed on the NRHP in Johnston County
- Mount Shiloh Missionary Baptist Church, New Bern, North Carolina, listed on the NRHP in Craven County
- Shiloh Baptist Church (Cleveland, Ohio), listed on the NRHP in Cuyahoga County
- Shiloh Baptist Church (Columbus, Ohio), listed on the NRHP in Columbus, Ohio
- Shiloh Baptist Church, Chattanooga, Tennessee (now known as First Baptist Church), listed on the NRHP in Hamilton County
- Shiloh Baptist Church (Gregg County, Texas)
- Shiloh Church (Newport, Rhode Island), listed on the NRHP as Shiloh Baptist Church in Newport County
- Shiloh Baptist Church (Old Site), a historic Baptist church in downtown Fredericksburg, Virginia
- Shiloh Baptist Church (Powhatan, Virginia)
- Shiloh Baptist Church (Alexandria, Virginia)
- Shiloh Baptist Church (Washington, D.C.)

== See also ==
- Shiloh Church (disambiguation)
