= Henrik Dam =

Danish biochemist and physiologist (1895–1976)

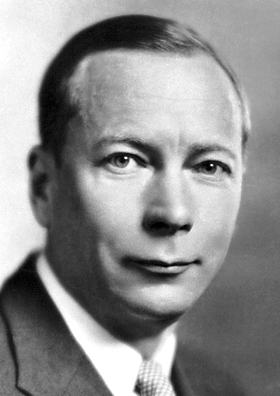
- Born: 21 February 1895; Copenhagen, Denmark
- Died: 17 April 1976 (aged 81); Copenhagen, Denmark
- Education: Copenhagen Polytechnic Institute; University of Graz
- Known for: Discovery of vitamin K
- Awards: Nobel Prize in Physiology or Medicine (1943)
- Scientific career
- Fields: Biochemistry and physiology
- Workplaces: University of Copenhagen; University of Rochester
- Thesis: Nogle Undersøgelser over Sterinernes Biologiske Betydning (Some investigations on the biological significance of the sterols) (1934)
- Academic advisors: Fritz Pregl

Carl Peter Henrik Dam (21 February 1895 – 17 April 1976) was a Danish biochemist and physiologist.

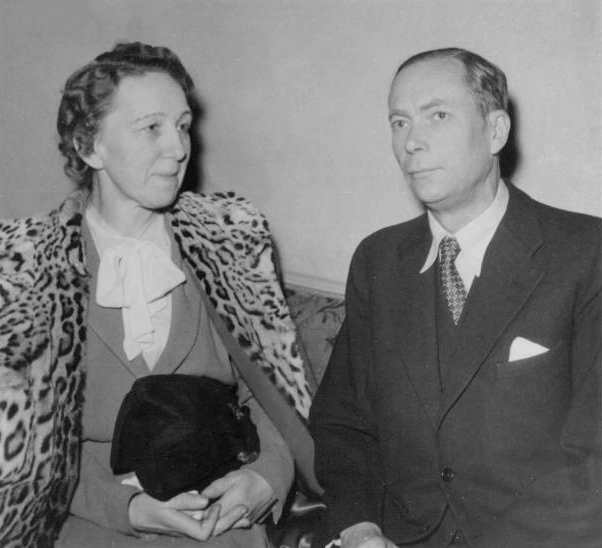
Dam with his wife in Stockholm in 1946

He was awarded the Nobel Prize in Medicine in 1943 for joint work with Edward Doisy in discovering vitamin K and its role in human physiology. Dam's key experiment involved feeding a cholesterol-free diet to chickens. He initially replicated experiments reported by scientists at the Ontario Agricultural College (OAC). McFarlane, Graham and Richardson, working on the chick feed program at OAC, had used chloroform to remove all fat from chick chow. They noticed that chicks fed only fat-depleted chow developed hemorrhages and started bleeding from tag sites. Dam found that these defects could not be restored by adding purified cholesterol to the diet. It appeared that—together with the cholesterol—a second compound had been extracted from the food, and this compound was called the coagulation vitamin. The new vitamin received the letter K because the initial discoveries were reported in a German journal, in which it was designated as Koagulationsvitamin.

He received an undergraduate degree in chemistry from the Copenhagen Polytechnic Institute (now the Technical University of Denmark) in 1920, and was appointed as assistant instructor in chemistry at the School of Agriculture and Veterinary Medicine. By 1923 he had attained the post of instructor in biochemistry at the University of Copenhagen's Physiological Laboratory. He studied microchemistry at the University of Graz under Fritz Pregl in 1925, but returned to the University of Copenhagen, where he was appointed as an assistant professor at the Institute of Biochemistry in 1928, and assistant professor in 1929. During his time as professor at the University of Copenhagen he spent some time working abroad, and in 1934 submitted the thesis Nogle Undersøgelser over Sterinernes Biologiske Betydning (Some Investigations on the Biological Significance of the Sterines) to the University of Copenhagen, and received the degree of PhD in biochemistry.

Between 1942 and 1945 Dam was a senior research associate at the University of Rochester; it was during this period that he was awarded the 1943 Nobel Prize for Physiology or Medicine. In 1951, he was one of seven Nobel Laureates who attended the first Lindau Nobel Laureate Meeting.

== See also ==
- University of Rochester
- List of Nobel Laureates affiliated with the University of Rochester
