= Fort Crowder =

Former U.S. Army post in Missouri

- Neosho, Newton County, Missouri

Site information
- Type: Army Post
- Owner: various

Location
- Coordinates: 36°49′6″N 94°22′10″W

Site history
- Built: 1941
- Built by: U.S. Army Corps of Engineers
- In use: 1941–1956
- Demolished: 1956

Garrison information
- Past commanders: Otto Frederick Lang Oct 41 – Jan 42; BG William S. Rumbough, Oct 41 – May 42; MG Walter E. Prosser, May 42 – Jun 45; BG Charles M. Milliken, Jun 45 – Mar 46; Col John Bartlett Murphy, May 46 – Mar 48

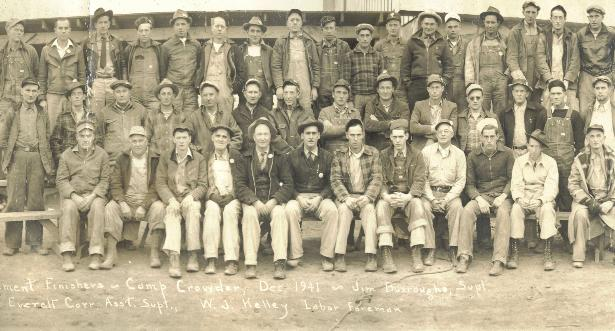
Cement finishers at Camp Crowder in December 1941.

Fort Crowder was a U.S. Army post located in Newton and McDonald counties in southwest Missouri, constructed and used during World War II.

== Establishment and purpose ==
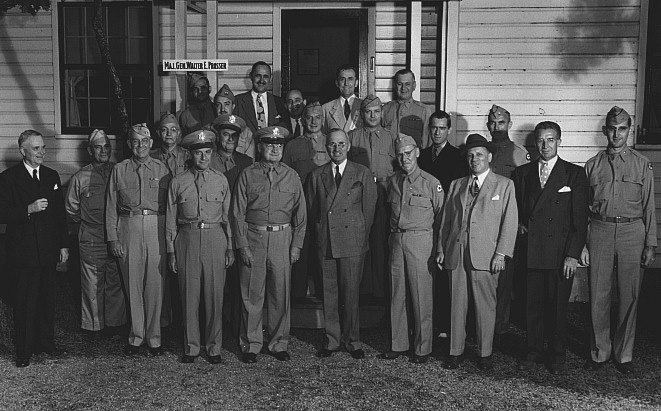
Senator Harry S. Truman at Camp Crowder.

Camp Crowder was a military installation named in honor of Major General Enoch H. Crowder, a native Missourian who was the provost marshal of the United States during World War I and author of the Selective Service Act of 1917. The camp, located south of Neosho, Missouri in an area originally named Pools Prairie, was established in 1941.

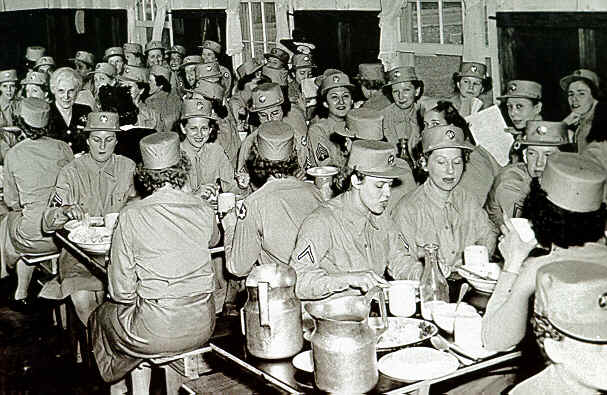
WACs in mess hall at Camp Crowder.

The Army selected the Neosho site for the post due to its proximity to water, a cross roads to two major railroads (Kansas City Southern and the Frisco railroads), and two major U.S. highways (US 71 running north–south and US 60 and US 66, running east–west). Originally it was to serve as an armor training center. As it was constructed, it was re-designated as a U.S. Army Signal Corps replacement training center, an Army Service Forces training center and an officer candidate preparatory school, the first of its kind at any military installation. The post also served as an infantry replacement center and had a German prisoner of war camp.

By 1943 the army had acquired 42,786.41 acres (173.2 km^{2}), 66.9 sq. mi. in Newton and McDonald counties.

== Notable individuals ==
Carl Reiner was stationed at Camp Crowder in the 1940s and when he created the 1960s-era The Dick Van Dyke Show, he made the post the setting where Rob and Laura Petrie, portrayed by actors Dick Van Dyke and Mary Tyler Moore, met; Rob was a sergeant in Special Services and Laura was a USO dancer. Cartoonist Mort Walker was also stationed there and drew inspiration for Camp Swampy of his Beetle Bailey comic strip. Jean Shepherd featured many stories of his time at Camp Crowder in various monologues. The post is also notable as the birthplace of landmark LabVIEW programmer Michael Porter.

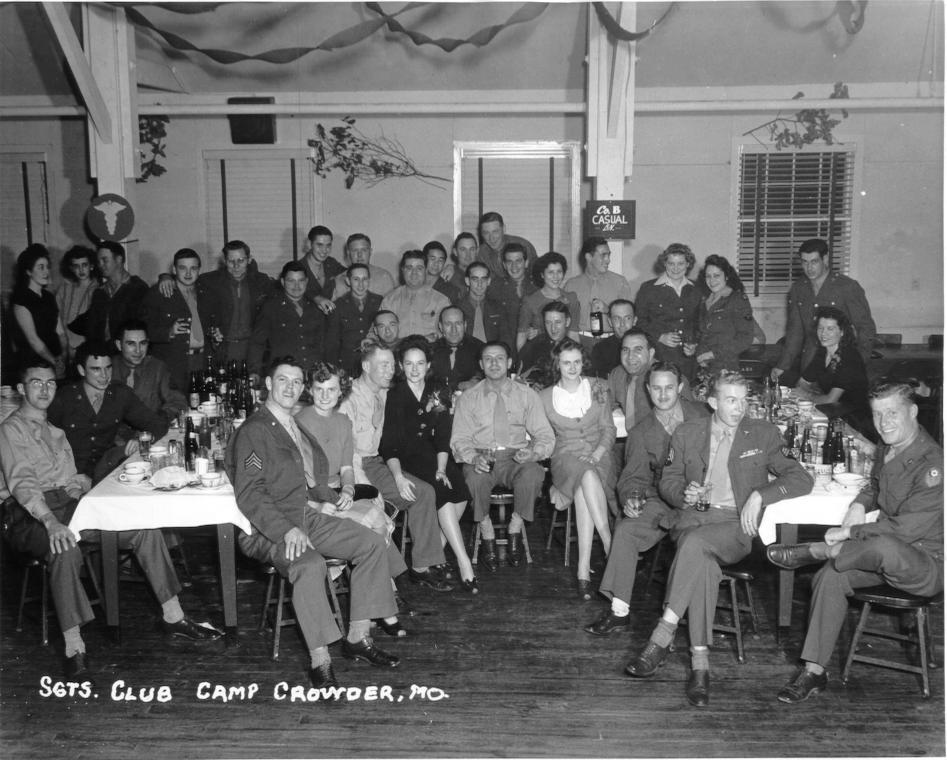
Sergeant's Club at Camp Crowder.

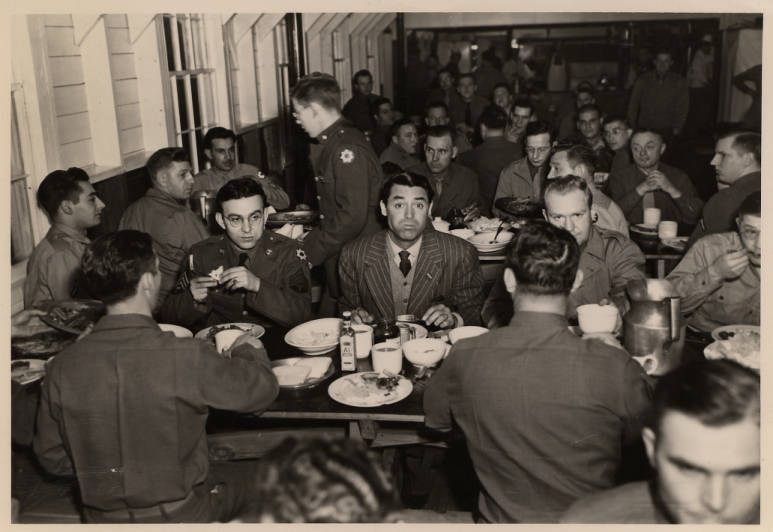
Cary Grant dining at Camp Crowder

== Post-war and Cold War use ==
In 1946, the post was deactivated and placed in a caretaker status. While the core of the post was retained, many of the wood temporary barracks were declared surplus and sold in a June 1946 public sale held by the U.S. War Assets Administration. The base's movie theatre was disassembled and reassembled on the campus of what is today the University of Missouri – Kansas City where it was the University of Kansas City Playhouse until being torn down for a new theatre. A walled patio and fireplace with masks of Comedy and Tragedy were built near the theater and are still landmarks on the university campus.

Two buildings were bought, disassembled, and moved to Sulphur Springs, Benton County, Arkansas: the Camp Crowder Gymnasium, and the gym at the Sulphur Springs Old School Complex Historic District.

In the early 1950s, local congressman Dewey Jackson Short, (R-7th District of Missouri) senior member of the House Armed Services Committee secured authorization and initial funding to build two permanent barracks and a disciplinary barracks and reactivate the post as a permanent installation, Fort Crowder. Beginning as a reception center for newly inducted draftees and enlistments who were issued the initial uniform clothing allowance and transferred to other army posts for initial testing and subsequent assignment to a basic training command. Short tried to have it designated a permanent home for the Army's military police training school.

== The space age ==
With Short's defeat in the 1956 election, the fort lost its legislative patron and was deactivated again in 1958. As that took place, about 2,000 acres (8.1 km^{2}) of the post was turned over to the U.S. Air Force as a buffer zone around Air Force Plant 65, a government owned-contractor operated liquid propelled rocket engine manufacturing facility operated by the Rocketdyne division of North American Aviation. The complex, serviced by a spur of the Kansas City Southern Railroad, included a main manufacturing facility, an engine testing area (ETA) for the live fire testing of rocket engines, a component testing area (CTA), and a former Camp Crowder warehouse, Building 900, as a warehouse and later engine overhaul and manufacturing.

For 16 years, starting in 1957, rocket engines for missiles such as the Atlas, Thor and Saturn were assembled and tested at Air Force Plant 65. The facility constructed and tested engines for the Mercury and Gemini programs until its contract ended in 1968.

The permanent barracks, were obtained as surplus and formed the core of the community college campus for Crowder College in 1962.

== Final disposition ==
With the end of the North American Rockwell contract, the remaining federal government holdings were transferred to the General Services Administration as surplus property for interim management and eventual disposal. In the mid-1980s, the remaining parcels of the former post were transferred to the Missouri Department of Conservation for wildlife management and outdoor recreation, the Neosho National Fish Hatchery which leases to the Neosho R-5 public school district for an agriculture instructional farm, and the Missouri National Guard to operate a military training facility under license from the U.S. Army Corps of Engineers on 4,358.09 acres (18 km^{2}). The remainder of the land was given to various public and private entities which uses now include a municipal airport, industrial parks, industrial waste treatment facility operations, regional landfill, underground fuel storage, burn pits and lagoons.

== Environmental issues ==
Groundwater and soil contamination has been identified in various areas of the base's original property boundaries. Trichloroethylene contamination in soils and groundwater has been documented at the site and may include off-site contamination in a number of private wells. Waste material generated from the former fort include aviation and vehicular fuels, oils, greases, metals, paints and solvents.

This area is a Superfund site.
