= Geological Survey of Israel =

Research institution in Israel

The Geological Survey of Israel (in Hebrew: המכון הגיאולוגי לישראל) is a national research institution in the field of earth sciences, operating within the framework of the Earth Sciences Administration of the Ministry of Energy and Infrastructure. The institute houses a database of geological studies conducted in the State of Israel and during the British Mandate period. The institute maintains professional cooperation with government research institutions, universities and other entities in Israel and abroad.

The institute continuously monitors earthquakes felt in Israel and adjacent area, and has produced a map indicating seismic risks according to different regions in the country.

== History ==
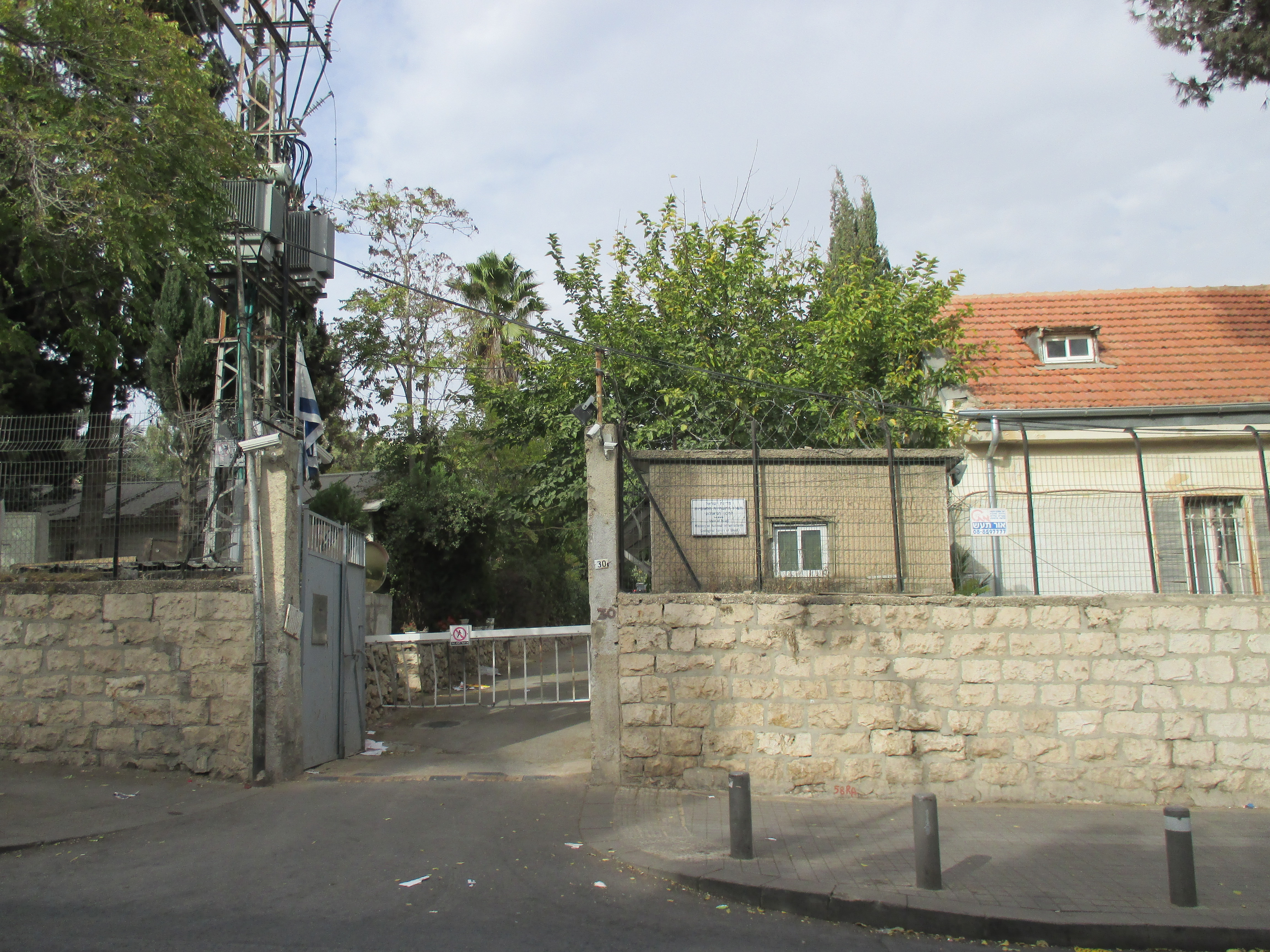
The entrance to the (former) Geological Institute building in the Schneller Military Camp in Jerusalem.

The Geological Survey of Israel was established on the basis of the Geological Survey of the British Mandate Government. Initially, the Institute was under the responsibility of the Ministry of Trade and Industry, and later transferred to the Prime Minister's Office and from there to the Ministry of Agriculture and the Ministry of Development. It is now under the responsibility of the Ministry of National Infrastructure, Energy and Water. In its early years, the Institute was engaged in preparing a geological map of Israel on a scale of 1:20,000.

In 1952, its offices moved to the St. John's Hospital building and in 1962, it moved to the Schneller Military Camp. A seismological station owned by the Ministry of Development (Geological Institute) and the Hebrew University (Department of Geology) was established in the 1960s.

In 1966 the Petroleum Department was transferred to the Petroleum Institute. In early 2020, the Seismology Division moved from the Israel Geophysical Institute to the Geological Institute. Since 2014, its new headquarters have been built on Yeshayahu Leibovich Street in Givat Ram.

=== The heads of the institute ===
The institute was headed in its early years by Professor Yehuda Leo Picard. Following the Ministry of Development's appeal to UNESCO, geologist Dr. Fritz Brutzen arrived from Sweden. He stayed in Israel in 1954–1955, and served as a consultant and director of the institute. After him the Institute was managed by: Yaakov Ben-Tor, Eliyahu Zohar (Liechtenstein), Uri Kafri, Yosef Bartov, Yaakov Mimran, Amos Bein, Gideon Shtaynitz, Benny Begin, Itay Gavrieli, Rivka Amit, Yossi Yechieli and Zohar Gvirtzman.

== Aims of the Institute ==
The aims of the institute are:

- Consolidationing national policy regarding the development of infrastructure and its interaction with the natural environment.
- Creating and maintaining databases for geoscience information.
- Estimation of natural and human-caused geohazards.
- Long term planning of sustainable development of natural resources.

== Earthquakes ==
The Geological Survey of Israel continuously monitors earthquakes felt in Israel and adjacent area. In light of this, the Institute's website provides: Rules of Conduct During Earthquakes. The Institute also presents a look at the distribution of the group of strong earthquakes in Israel and its surroundings over the past century, as shown in the map of the location of earthquakes in our region (archived September 29, 2013, at the Wayback Machine), showing that most of them occurred in the following areas:

- The Gulf of Eilat (Aqaba) – was the most active section of the 20th century, with the most notable being the 1995 Gulf of Aqaba earthquake, which measured 7.1 on the Richter scale and was accompanied by thousands of weaker aftershocks. This was followed by the activity in the Dead Sea, which peaked in the strong 1927 Jericho earthquake, which measured 6.2, but caused far more casualties and damage due to its proximity to populated areas. Much less activity was recorded in the Sea of Galilee, Hula, and the valleys of eastern Samaria.
  - There has been intense seismic activity around the Carmel Ridge (Fault). Although no strong earthquake has yet been reported, geological considerations cannot rule out the possibility that one could occur in the future.
- The Cyprus Arc – is an active area, although the Dead Sea region poses a more significant risk factor in Israel due to its proximity to settlement centers. Most of the activity occurs along the southern coast of the island of Cyprus, and in this context, the earthquake of October 1996, which was also felt well in Israel, can be noted.
- The Gulf of Suez – seemingly the quietest of borders. However, attention should be paid to what is happening at its edges. At its southern end, in March 1969, what is likely the most powerful earthquake in the last century within the boundaries of the Sinai subplate occurred. At its northwestern edge, the Cairo earthquake occurred in October 1992, and although it only reached a magnitude of 5.9, it was the deadliest in the last century here.
- Time – A great deal of effort is invested in detecting precursors to strong tremors. For example, it is noticed that sometimes a weak "seismic noise" precedes a strong tremor, but this could only be learned about in retrospect.

=== Earthquake forecasting ===
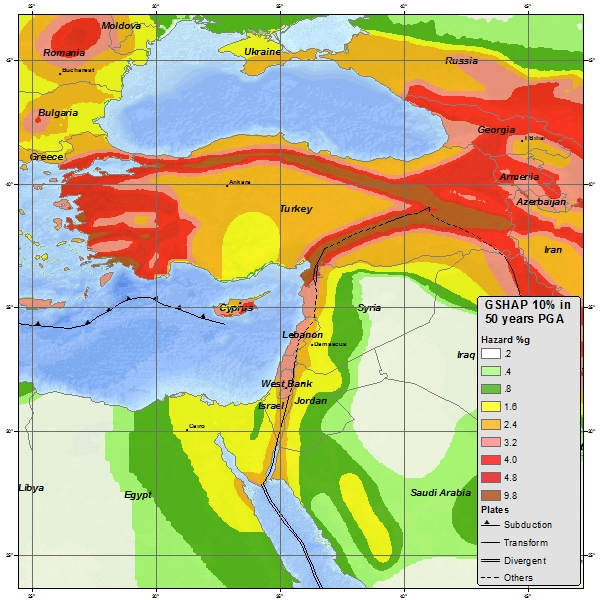
An assessment of the hazard of abnormal seismic activity in the Levant region over the next 50 years according to the Global Seismic Activity Assessment Program (GSHAP).

Despite scientific progress, the subject of earthquake prediction remains one of the most complicated in seismological research. Although it is clear that earthquakes repeat themselves on the same pattern, the periodicity is not ordered in time and cannot be relied upon for prediction. However, this difficulty can be overcome by considering separately:

- Location – Most of the earthquakes in our area have occurred in the Dead Sea region. Its proximity to population centers in Israel increases the risk to humans.
- Magnitude – Experience accumulated worldwide shows that the longer the Seismic quiescence, the stronger the tremors it will cause. Either way it appears that the maximum tremor expected in the Dead Sea region, could reach magnitude 7.5 on the Richter scale.
- In February 2022 the institute inaugurated the "Tru'a" system, which in the event of an earthquake will provide a short warning lasting a few seconds to tens of seconds through the Home Front Command application and a unique siren of war alarm sirens combined with a public address system, that will announce 'earthquake', based on the time it takes for earthquake waves to spread from the epicenter to population centers. Example: When an earthquake occurs in the northern Dead Sea, the warning for Jerusalem residents will be approximately three seconds, for Tel Aviv residents approximately 18 seconds, and for Haifa residents approximately 30 seconds.

== See also ==
- U.S. Geological Suevey (USGS)
- Geophysical Institute of Israel
- Israel Institute for Oceanographic and Limnological Research
