= Shiloh Township =

Shiloh Township is the name of the following places in the United States:

- Shiloh Township, Randolph County, Arkansas
- Shiloh Township, Edgar County, Illinois
- Shiloh Township, Jefferson County, Illinois
- Shiloh Township, Grundy County, Iowa
- Shiloh Township, Neosho County, Kansas
- Shiloh Township, Camden County, North Carolina
- Shiloh Township, Iredell County, North Carolina

== See also ==
- Shiloh Valley Township, St. Clair County, Illinois
- Shiloh (disambiguation)
