= Edward Adelbert Doisy =

American biochemist (1893–1986)

Edward A. Doisy
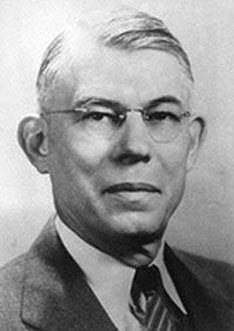
- Born: November 13, 1893; Hume, Illinois, U.S.
- Died: October 23, 1986 (aged 92); St. Louis, Missouri, U.S.
- Education: University of Illinois at Urbana-Champaign; Harvard University
- Known for: Vitamin K
- Awards: Willard Gibbs Award (1941); Nobel Prize in Physiology or Medicine (1943)
- Scientific career
- Fields: Biochemistry
- Workplaces: Washington University in St. Louis; Saint Louis University; University of Chicago
- Doctoral advisor: Otto Folin

Edward Adelbert Doisy (November 13, 1893 – October 23, 1986) was an American biochemist. He received the Nobel Prize in Physiology or Medicine in 1943 with Henrik Dam for their discovery of vitamin K (K from "Koagulations-Vitamin" in German) and its chemical structure.

Doisy was born in Hume, Illinois, on November 13, 1893. He completed his A.B. degree in 1914 and his M.S. degree in 1916 in chemistry from the University of Illinois at Urbana-Champaign. He served from 1917–1919 as a lieutenant in the United States Army Sanitary Corps at the Rockefeller Institute for Medical Research and then at the Walter Reed Hospital. He completed his Ph.D. in 1920 from Harvard University.

In 1919 he accepted a faculty appointment in the Department of Biochemistry at Washington University School of Medicine, where he rose in rank to associate professor. In 1923, he moved to Saint Louis University as professor and chairman of the new Department of Biochemistry. He served as professor and chairman of that department until he retired in 1965. Saint Louis University renamed the department the E.A. Doisy Department of Biochemistry, in his honor. More recently, the department has again been renamed. It is now known as the E.A. Doisy Department of Biochemistry and Molecular Biology.

In 1940, he was a lecturer in medicine at the University of Chicago School of Medicine.

He also competed with Adolf Butenandt in the discovery of estrone in 1930. They discovered the substance independently, but only Butenandt was awarded the Nobel Prize in Chemistry in 1939.

Doisy was elected to the United States National Academy of Sciences in 1938, the American Philosophical Society in 1942, and the American Academy of Arts and Sciences in 1948.

Following his death in 1986, his family endowed the Edward A. and Margaret Doisy College of Health Sciences. The Edward A. Doisy Research Center was built and named in his honor in 2007, following a $30,000,000 gift from the Doisy family.

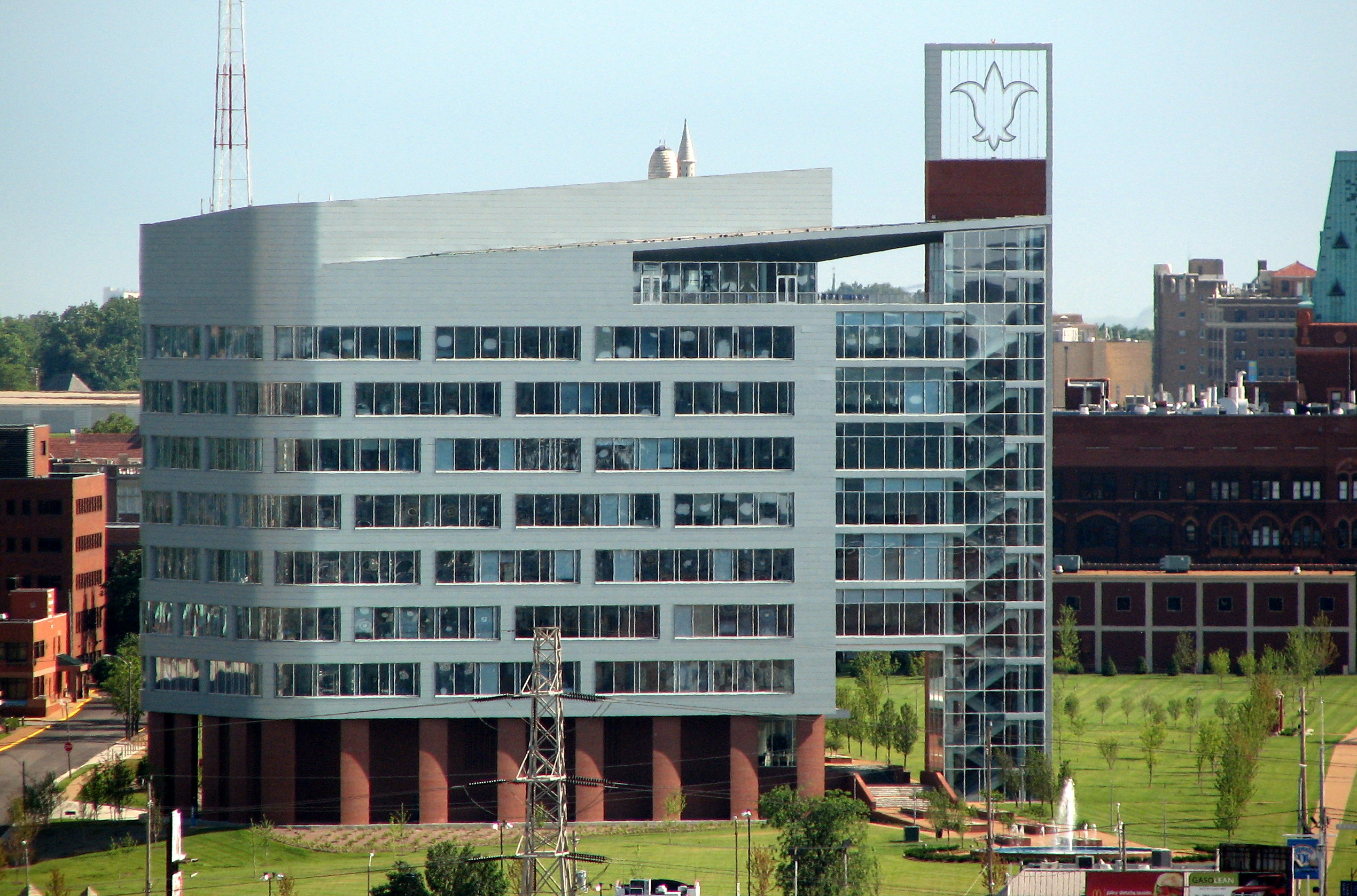
Edward A. Doisy Research Center at Saint Louis University
