= Geophysical Institute of Israel =

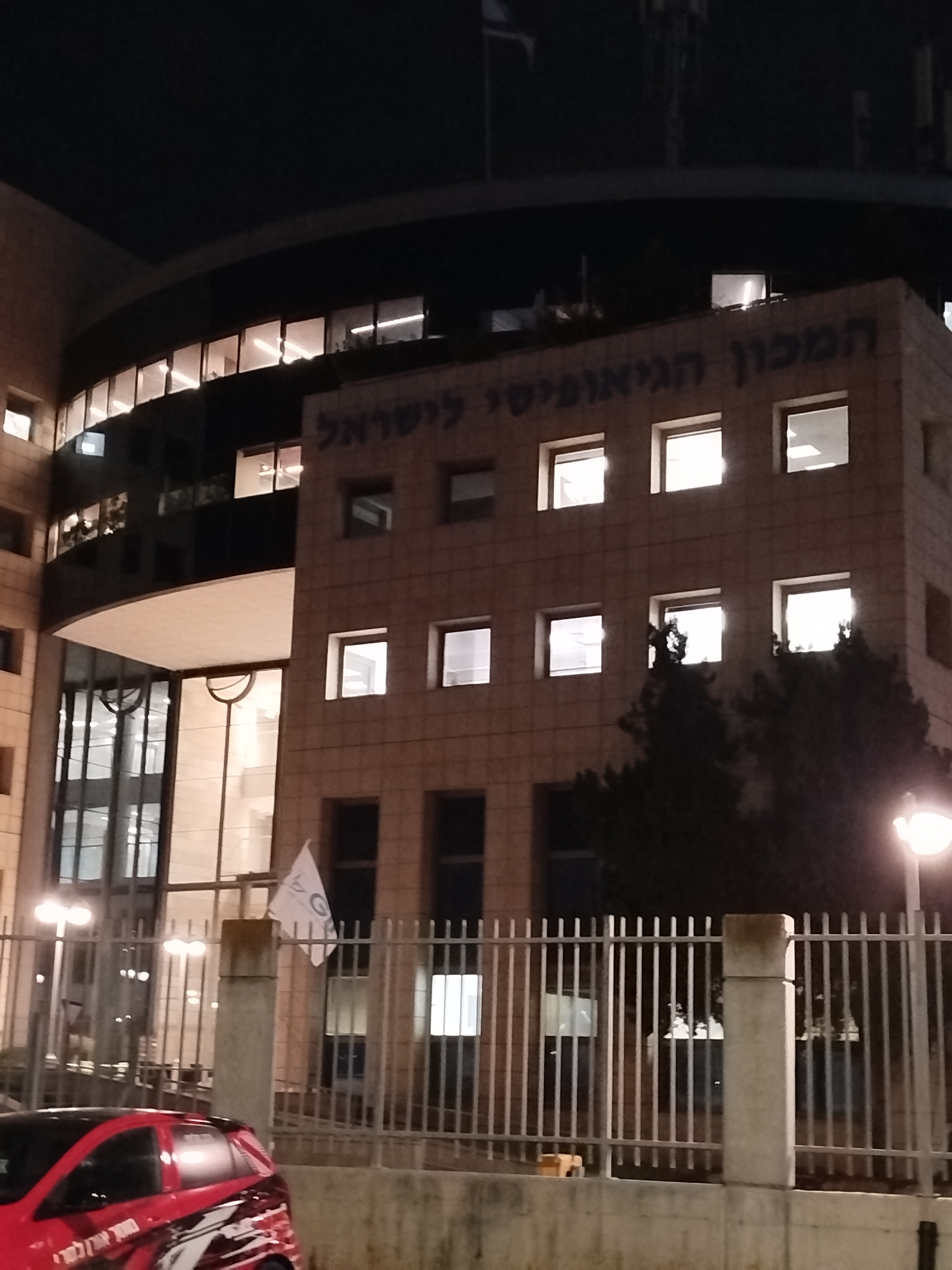
The Geophysical Institute building in Lod.

The Geophysical Institute of Israel - GII (in Hebrew: המכון הגאופיזי לישראל) is a government company whose purpose is to conduct geophysical surveys and research for the exploration of oil, minerals, groundwater, and other natural resources. The institute also provides additional geophysical and seismographic services to the government, companies, and organizations.

== History ==
The institute was established in 1951 at the Weizmann Institute of Science, and in 1957 it became a government company. In 1958 it moved into its first offices in Holon. In 2000, the institute moved to its new home in Lod. The owners of the institute are the Government of Israel (99.9%) and Timna Copper Mines Ltd. (0.1%). The Minister of Energy is responsible for the affairs of the institute and, together with the Prime Minister, has the powers specified in the law regarding the affairs of the institute.

The Institute operated the Seismology Division, which collects data and monitors earthquakes in Israel and adjacent area. The division currently operates within the Geological Survey of Israel.

The GII acts as a 'one-stop-shop' for geophysical services in onshore and transition zone exploration and detection underground.

== Geophysics work ==
The institute uses the investigative power of geophysics, out in the field, and on the computer. This means using seismic waves, magnetic and gravity potential fields, and the wide range of electro-magnetic frequency applications to collect information about the structure composition, fluid content and anomalies in the sub-surface.

Threats are now apparent underground. Whether upon country borders or sensitive facilities, the institute looks for solutions for pinpointing threats and attacks underground in real time.

== Studies ==
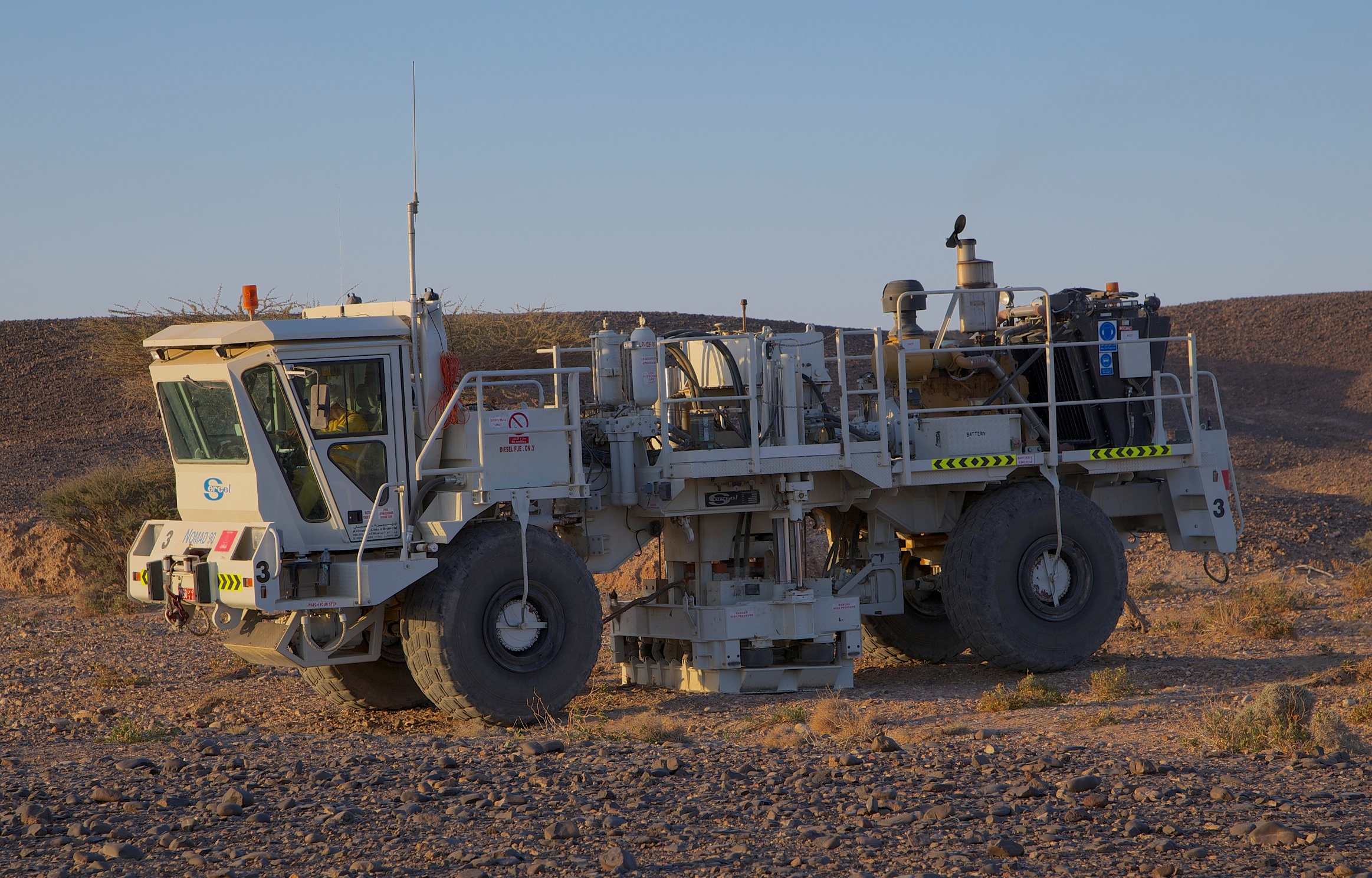
A Seismic Vibrator (an illustration) Used for Seismic Surveys.

The main fields of development in the GII are:

- Microseismic - Developing novel microseismic array patterns and algorithms, in partnership with "Seismik sro".
- Diffraction Imaging Techniques – subsurface void detection
- Sinkhole detection - Developing a multi-disciplinary integrated geophysical approach for studying the mechanism of sinkhole generation in the Dead Sea area.
- Drones - exploring the use of drone support in geophysical field operations.
- Seismic Source - exploring light weight, high energy, low environmental impact energy sources.
- Deep Crust - exploring the physical properties of the deep crust, in partnership with the USGS.

=== Surveys ===
In recent years, the institute has been conducting surveys to search for minerals outside Israel's borders (for example, in Cyprus and Turkey), so that in 2000, half of the institute's total income came from these searches. The State Comptroller examined whether this activity deviated from the original goals and whether there was justification for the activity to be carried out within the framework of a government company. The audit findings show that the "lion's share" of the institute's income is from the sale of commercial services in Israel and abroad, and only a small portion stems from activities that the government designated for it when it was established. It is appropriate that the examination of the institute's activities as a government company be completed and a position on the matter be formulated as soon as possible.
