= Metcalf, Illinois =

Metcalf
- Village
- Location of Metcalf in Edgar County, Illinois.

- Metcalf's location in Edgar County
- Coordinates: 39°48′02″N 87°48′28″W
- Country: United States
- State: Illinois
- County: Edgar
- Township: Young America

Area
  - Total: 0.59 sq mi (1.54 km^{2})
  - Land: 0.59 sq mi (1.54 km^{2})
  - Water: 0 sq mi (0.00 km^{2})
- Elevation: 663 ft (202 m)

Population (2020)
  - Total: 139
  - Density: 234.1/sq mi (90.38/km^{2})
- Time zone: UTC-6 (CST)
  - Summer (DST): UTC-5 (CDT)
- ZIP code: 61940
- Area code: 217
- FIPS code: 17–48632
- GNIS feature ID: 2399327

Metcalf is a village in Young America Township, Edgar County, Illinois, United States. As of the 2020 census, Metcalf had a population of 139.

== Geography ==
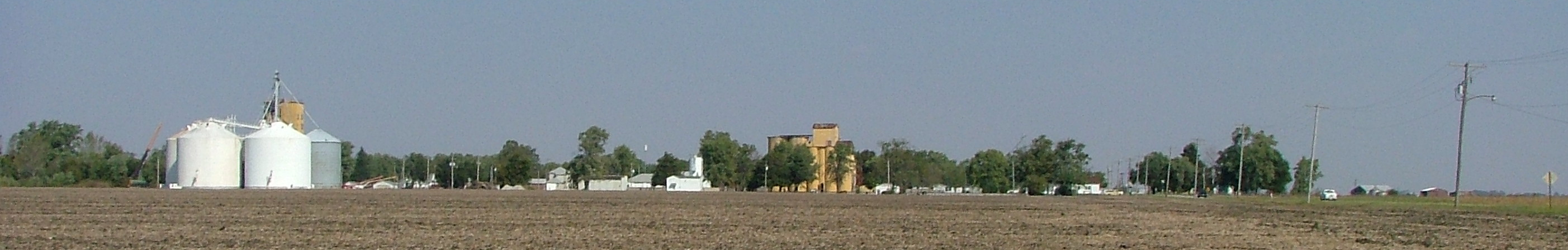
Metcalf from the south

According to the 2010 census, Metcalf has a total area of 0.69 square miles (1.79 km^{2}), all land.

== Demographics ==
Historical population
Census	Pop.	Note	%±
1880	50		—
1890	244		388.0%
1900	429		75.8%
1910	449		4.7%
1920	509		13.4%
1930	401		−21.2%
1940	328		−18.2%
1950	312		−4.9%
1960	278		−10.9%
1970	269		−3.2%
1980	278		3.3%
1990	227		−18.3%
2000	213		−6.2%
2010	189		−11.3%
2020	139		−26.5%
U.S. Decennial Census

As of the 2020 census there were 139 people, 113 households, and 92 families residing in the village. The population density was 234.01 inhabitants per square mile (90.35/km^{2}). There were 67 housing units at an average density of 112.79 units per square mile (43.55 units/km^{2}). The racial makeup of the village was 93.53% White, 0.72% African American, 0.72% Native American, 0.72% from other races, and 4.32% from two or more races. Hispanic or Latino of any race were 1.44% of the population.

There were 113 households, out of which 46.9% had children under the age of 18 living with them, 74.34% were married couples living together, 3.54% had a female householder with no husband present, and 18.58% were non-families. 18.58% of all households were made up of individuals, and 7.08% had someone living alone who was 65 years of age or older. The average household size was 2.34 and the average family size was 2.12.

The village's age distribution consisted of 21.3% under the age of 18, 2.5% from 18 to 24, 30.5% from 25 to 44, 23.4% from 45 to 64, and 22.2% who were 65 years of age or older. The median age was 44.4 years. For every 100 females, there were 132.0 males. For every 100 females age 18 and over, there were 123.8 males.

The median income for a household in the village was $45,919, and the median income for a family was $46,691. Males had a median income of $31,250 versus $25,347 for females. The per capita income for the village was $21,763. About 2.2% of families and 6.3% of the population were below the poverty line, including 5.9% of those under age 18 and none of those age 65 or over.
