= Shiloh, Texas =

Shiloh, Texas may refer to:

- Shiloh, Gregg County, Texas, an unincorporated community
- Shiloh, Houston County, Texas, a ghost town
- Shiloh, Waller County, Texas, an unincorporated settlement

== See also ==
- Shiloh (disambiguation)
