= Hume, Illinois =

Hume
- Village
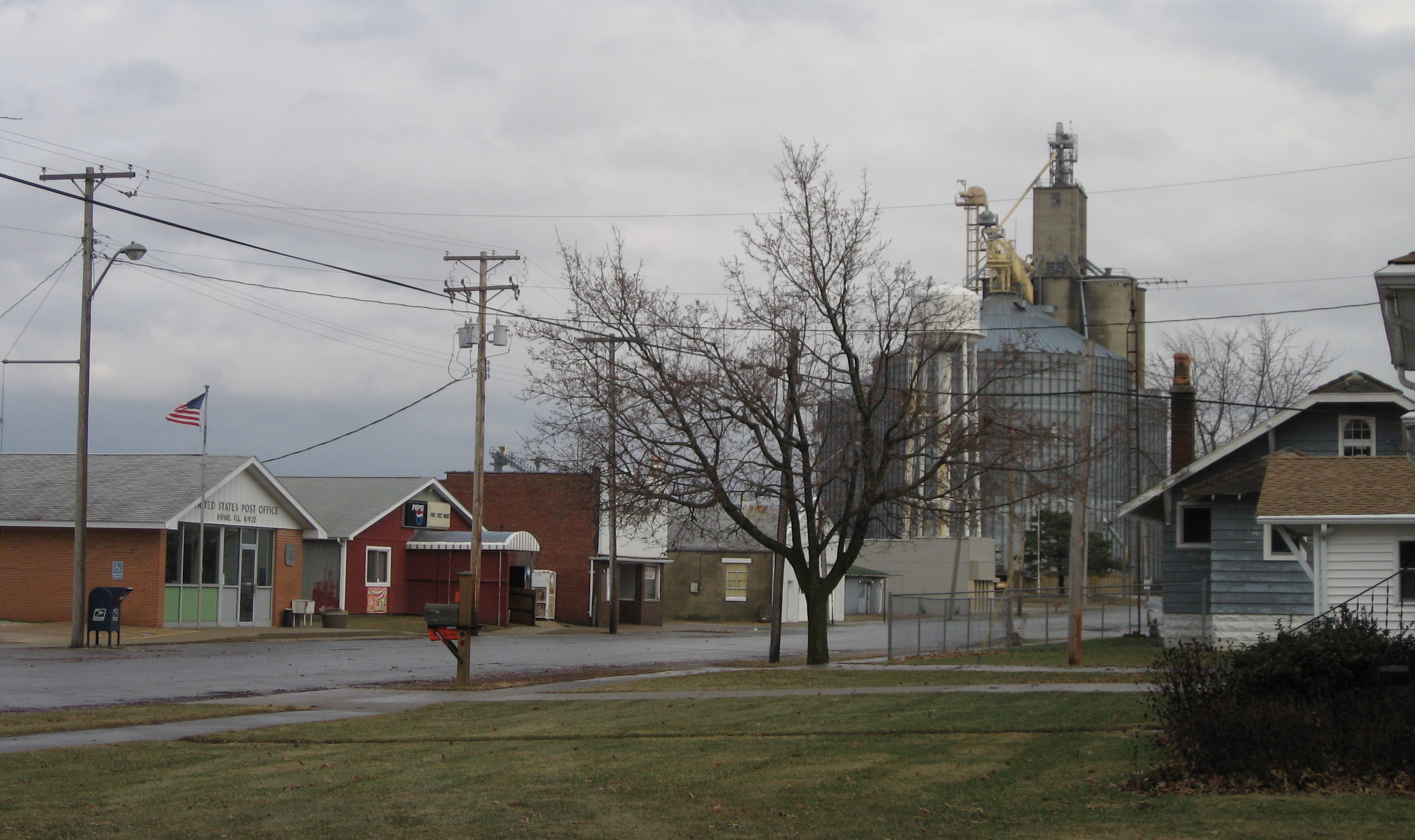
- Front Street of Hume, 2008

- Location of Hume in Edgar County, Illinois.

- Hume's location in Edgar County
- Coordinates: 39°47′54″N 87°52′22″W
- Country: USA
- State: Illinois
- County: Edgar
- Township: Shiloh, Young America
- Incorporated: 1873

Area
  - Total: 0.57 sq mi (1.47 km^{2})
  - Land: 0.57 sq mi (1.47 km^{2})
  - Water: 0 sq mi (0.00 km^{2})
- Elevation: 653 ft (199 m)

Population (2020)
  - Total: 325
  - Density: 574.5/sq mi (221.81/km^{2})
- Time zone: UTC-6 (CST)
  - Summer (DST): UTC-5 (CDT)
- ZIP code: 61932
- Area code: 217
- FIPS code: 17–36568
- GNIS feature ID: 2398560

Hume is a village in Shiloh and Young America townships, Edgar County, Illinois, United States. As of the 2020 census, the village population was 325.

== History ==
The future site of Hume was most likely part of the Illinois Confederation in the Pre-Columbian period. White settlers of the 19th century in the area reported relationships with Kickapoo peoples.

In the early 19th century, the area of Illinois including the future site of the Village of Hume and the Young America Township was prairie and thus considered unsuitable for settlement or tillage. Land speculators bought local land from the government (known as "entering land") on the hope that it would become possible to cultivate it in the near future. Large herds of cattle often grazed on the open land during this period.

In 1857, the Indiana and Illinois Airline railroad was laid out and graded, although it would be fifteen years before rails were laid. In February 1865, Elzephan W. S. Hume moved to Illinois from Boone County, Kentucky, and purchased about 300 acres (1.2 km^{2}) of land along the proposed line of the Indiana and Illinois Airline railroad. By November, he opened a farm and began cultivation. In the spring of 1873, the railroad was complete through Edgar county. In later years, the railroad was expanded to Indianapolis and was called the Indianapolis, Decatur and Springfield Railway. The railroad would change names several times before being incorporated into the Baltimore and Ohio Railroad.

In 1873, E. W. S. Hume made plans for a town on his land, although no buildings existed on the planned town at that time. He also made an agreement with the railroad company to build a station for Hume, in exchange for lots of land in the new village. The names Elzephan W. S. Hume, Henry C. Moore, Thomas H. McCoughty, and H. B. Hammond appear on the original plat for the incorporation of Hume. George W. Foreman laid out the village of Hume in early November 1873 for those four men.

O. H. Rogers built the first house and the first store on the town's plat. E. W. S. Hume was the first President of the Village and the first Postmaster.

A census taken in 1879 gave a population of 270 residents, thirty short of the number required by Illinois state law to incorporate as a town. The improved drainage of prairie for farms encouraged the growth of Hume in the late 19th century. By 1890, a local newspaper named The Weekly Record was published by D. V. Bradley, son of Dr. S. H. Bradley.

In 1881, a railroad named the Danville, Olney and Ohio River Railroad passed through Hume, going north and south. It was known locally as the Chicago & Ohio River line.

In 1896, the Young America Cemetery was founded by the sale of stock in the cemetery's association.

In 1913, the Hume Manufacturing Company was founded to produce tractors of a new design. A factory was built opposite the railroad tracks from Front Street. Thirty-five tractors were built from 1913 to 1917. The Atlas Lyons Company of Indianapolis purchased the company's stock and its assets.

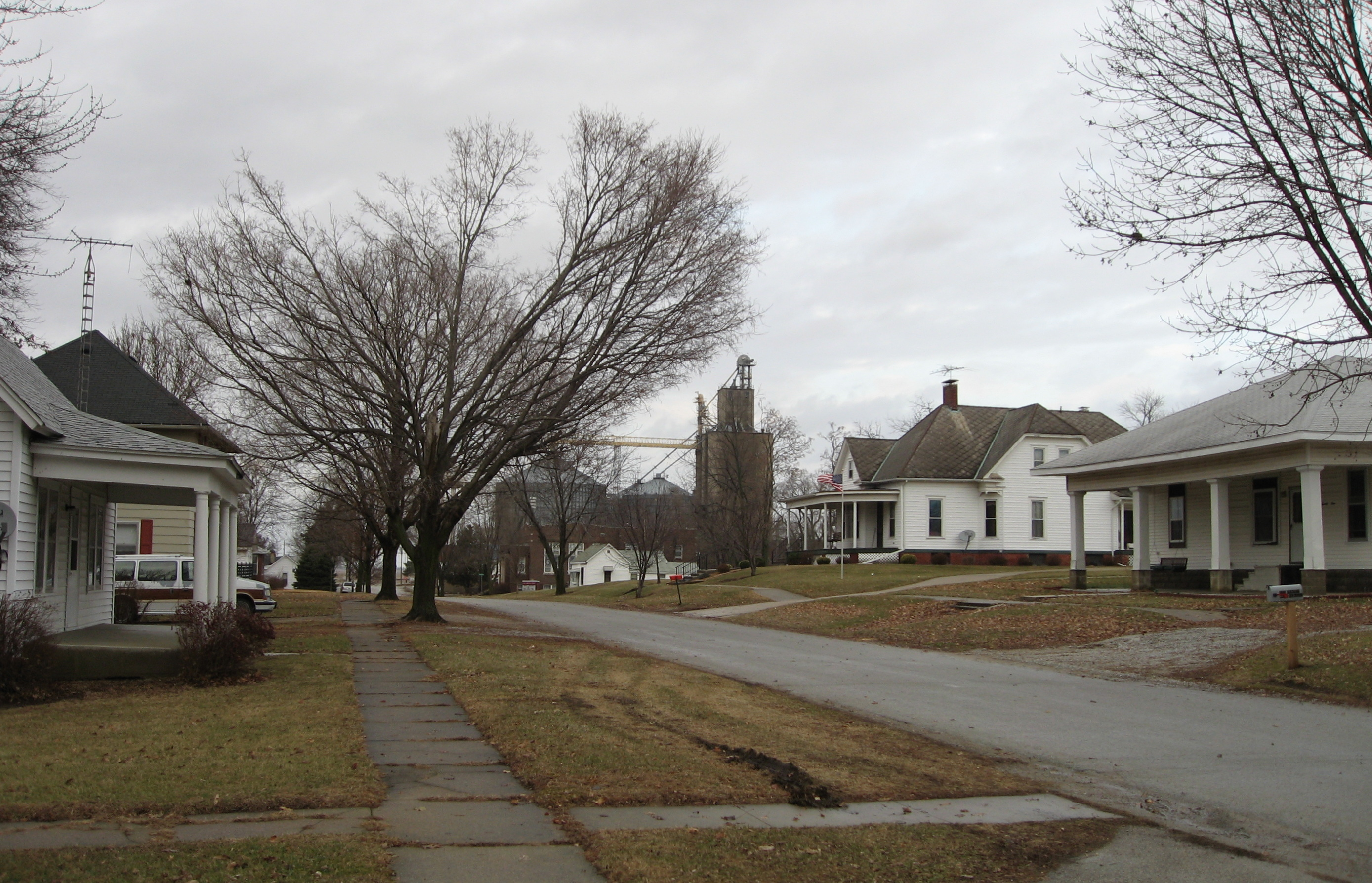
Northern Part of Hume from Center Street

== Geography ==
According to the 2021 census gazetteer files, Hume has a total area of 0.57 square miles (1.48 km^{2}), all land.

The great majority of the Village is part of Young America Township. A southern part of Hume is in Shiloh Township.

== Demographics ==
Historical population
Census	Pop.	Note	%±
1880	179		—
1890	433		141.9%
1900	598		38.1%
1910	572		−4.3%
1920	609		6.5%
1930	585		−3.9%
1940	489		−16.4%
1950	448		−8.4%
1960	449		0.2%
1970	496		10.5%
1980	483		−2.6%
1990	406		−15.9%
2000	382		−5.9%
2010	380		−0.5%
2020	325		−14.5%
U.S. Decennial Census

As of the 2020 census there were 325 people, 202 households, and 139 families residing in the village. The population density was 574.20 inhabitants per square mile (221.70/km^{2}). There were 184 housing units at an average density of 325.09 units per square mile (125.52 units/km^{2}). The racial makeup of the village was 96.00% White, 0.31% from other races, and 3.69% from two or more races. Hispanic or Latino of any race were 1.23% of the population.

There were 202 households, out of which 24.8% had children under the age of 18 living with them, 53.47% were married couples living together, 12.38% had a female householder with no husband present, and 31.19% were non-families. 23.27% of all households were made up of individuals, and 13.37% had someone living alone who was 65 years of age or older. The average household size was 2.97 and the average family size was 2.45.

The village's age distribution consisted of 25.9% under the age of 18, 12.7% from 18 to 24, 16.5% from 25 to 44, 27.9% from 45 to 64, and 17.0% who were 65 years of age or older. The median age was 39.3 years. For every 100 females, there were 104.5 males. For every 100 females age 18 and over, there were 118.5 males.

The median income for a household in the village was $56,964, and the median income for a family was $65,208. Males had a median income of $49,167 versus $25,625 for females. The per capita income for the village was $26,848. About 10.8% of families and 15.8% of the population were below the poverty line, including 25.8% of those under age 18 and 2.4% of those age 65 or over.

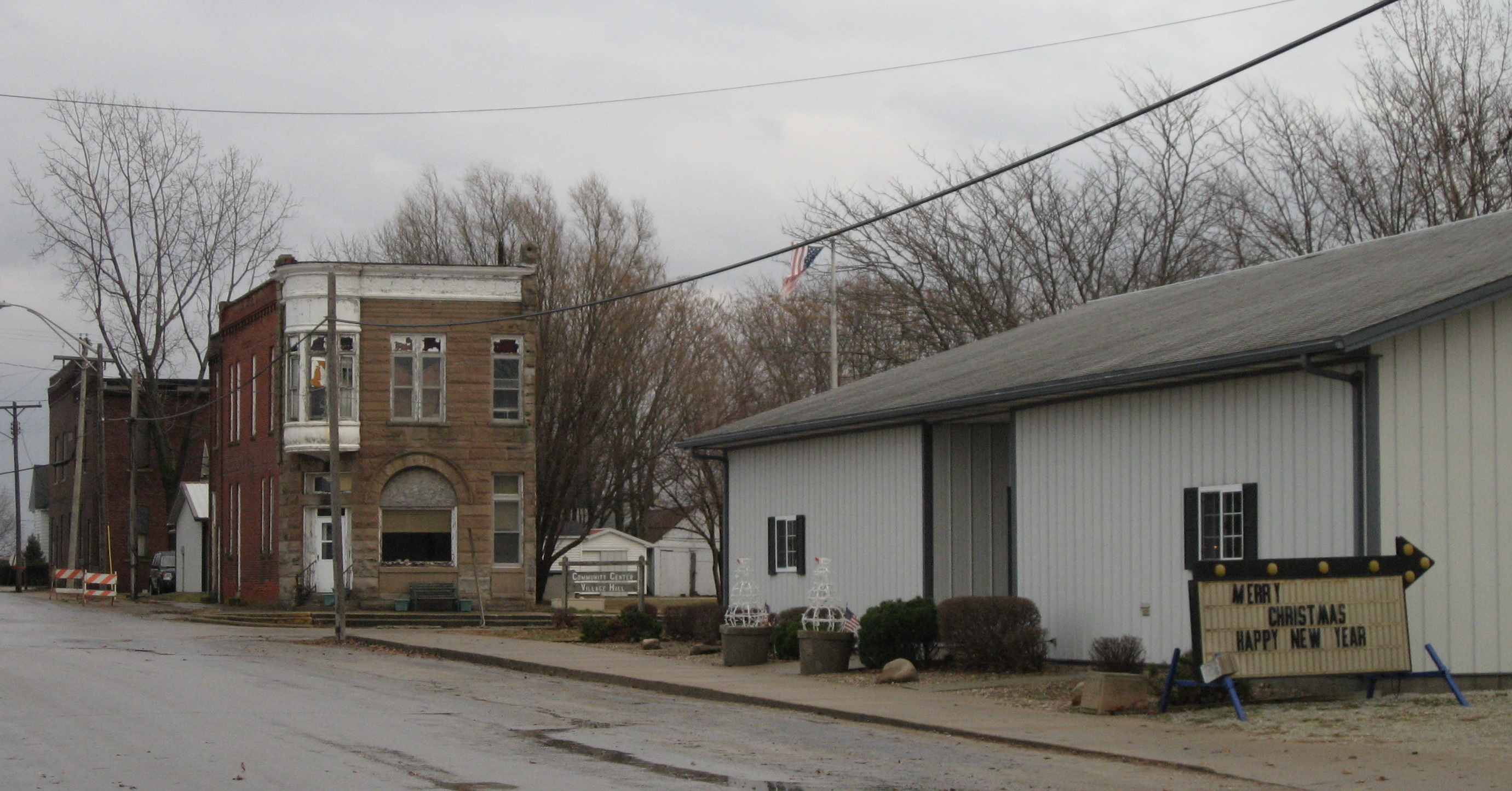
Village Hall and Community Center of Hume, 2008

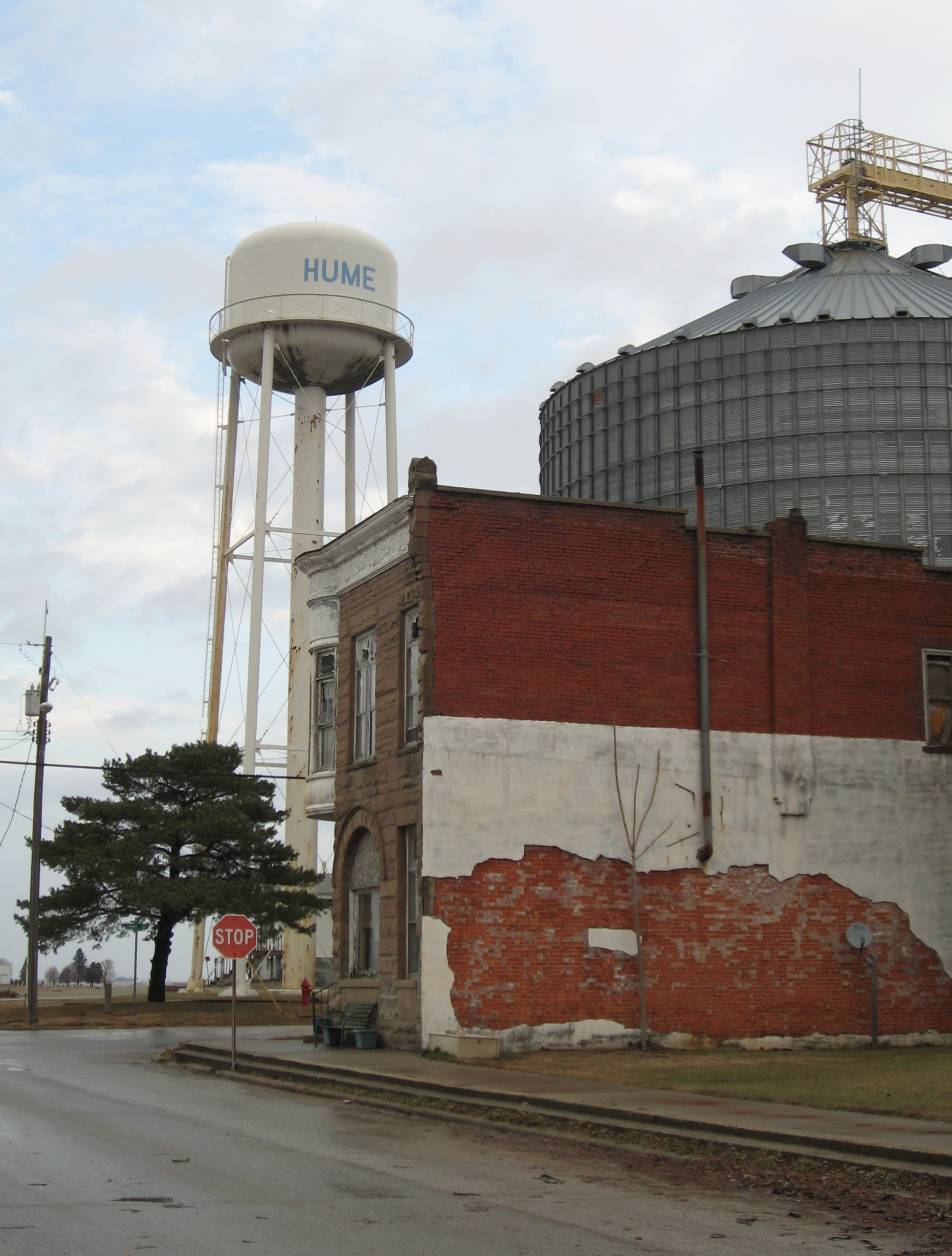
Water Tower for Hume, 2008

== Education ==
In 1870, E. W. S. Hume donated a site for a one-room school. The school was built by Peter Cockrell at the present intersection of East Street and First Street, within the village of Hume. The first teacher was Anna Grimes. In 1878, a second room was added, to form an L-shaped building.

High-school level studies began after 1880, and the school began to use overflow sites around Hume. The first brick schoolhouse was built in 1884 from bricks made in a local kiln, on the site of the present city park at the intersection of Center Street and Fourth Street.

The cornerstone for another new school was laid on July 4, 1900, across Center Street from the former schoolhouse. The School Gym was erected in 1927.

A township high school was organized in 1913, after a referendum held March 8, 1913, to form District 148, covering 20,160 acres (82 km^{2}) within Edgar County. In 1947, the consolidated school of Hume was formed, including the former Hume area schools of Baum, Dodd, Maple Grove, Bane, Gilkey, Melwood, Wyatt, and Palermo. The voters decided on July 1, 1947, to form a Community Unit District including Hume, Metcalf and Brocton.

In 1967, voters agreed to issue bonds to construct a single, central school for kindergarten through grade 12, and Shiloh School opened in August 1968.

== Religion ==
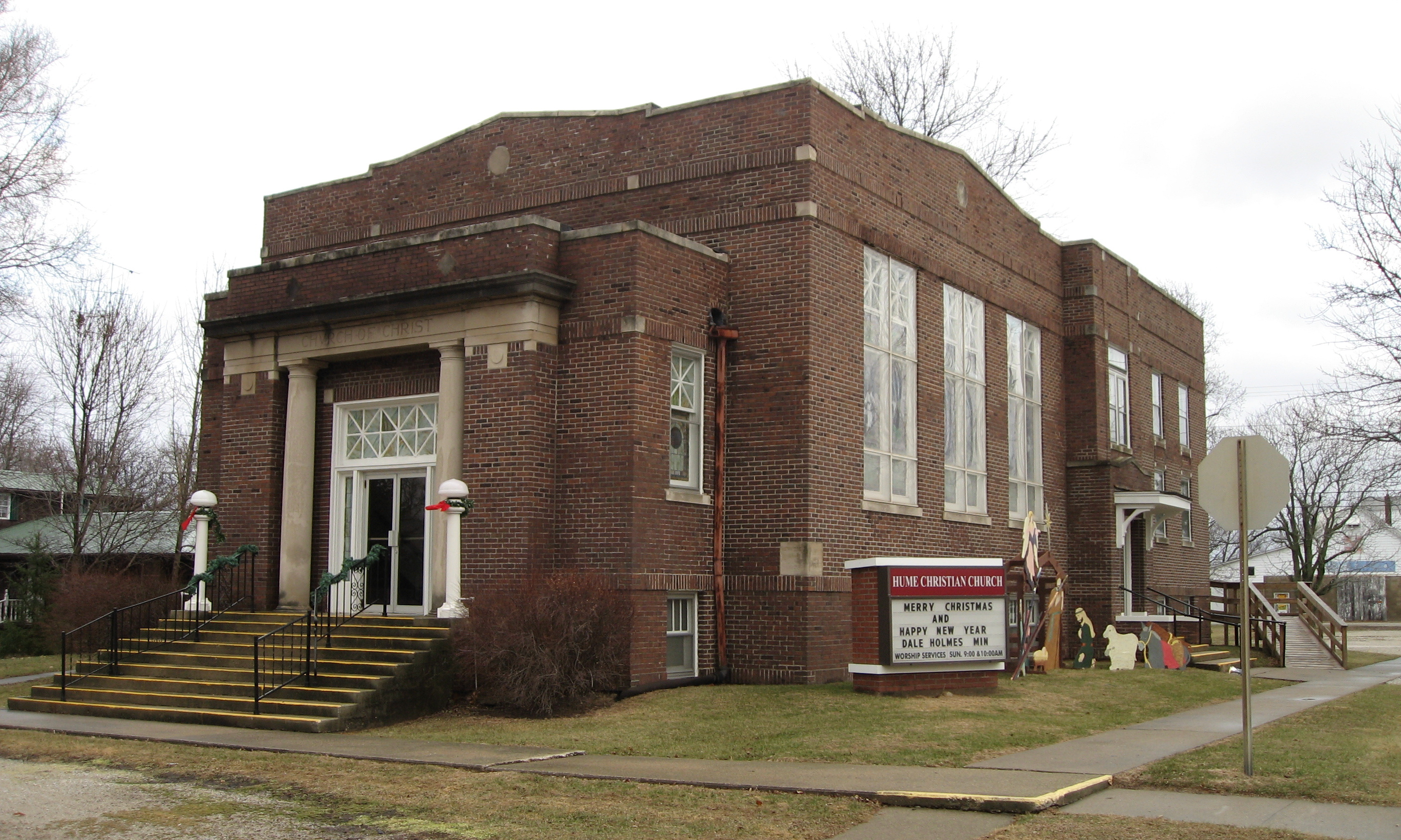
Christian Church of Hume, 2008

Until 1875, Christians in Hume traveled to Chrisman, Illinois to attend religious ceremonies. The Christian Church was organized in 1875 by Christopher C. Boyer. J. W. Perkins was the first minister. In 1880, the congregation built a church at the corner of East and Second Streets. In 1916, the church was struck by lightning and burned to the ground. The cornerstone of the present church was laid on August 4, 1917, at the corner of Center Street and First Street.

A society of Methodists was formed in 1877, with meetings held in a schoolhouse on the northeast corner of East Street and First Street.

The Catholic Church of Hume is named St. Michael's.

== Notable person ==
- Edward Adelbert Doisy, biochemist, Nobel Prize winner (1943), born in Hume (1893)
