= Shiloh, Tennessee =

Shiloh is the name of six places in the State of Tennessee in the United States of America:

- Shiloh, Bedford County, Tennessee
- Shiloh, Carroll County, Tennessee
- Shiloh, Hardin County, Tennessee
- Shiloh, Hawkins County, Tennessee
- Shiloh, Montgomery County, Tennessee
- Shiloh, Rutherford County, Tennessee

== See also ==
- In Shiloh, Hardin County:
  - Shiloh National Military Park
  - Battle of Shiloh
  - Shiloh Indian Mounds Site
- Shiloh is also the name of towns in several other states
