= Sulphur Springs Old School Complex Historic District =

Historic district in Arkansas, United States

- U.S. National Register of Historic Places
- U.S. Historic district
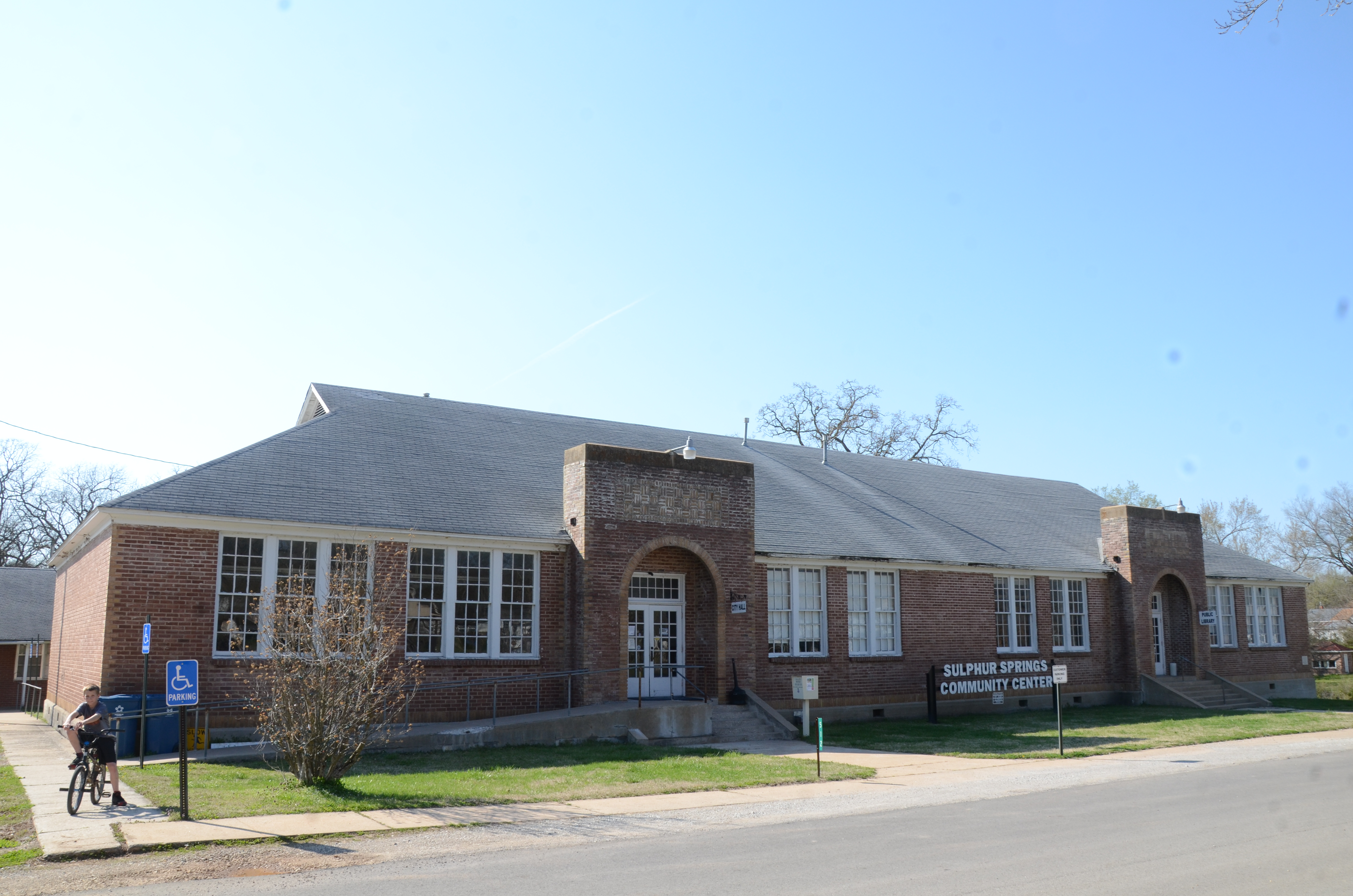

- Location within Arkansas Location within the United States
- Location: 512 Black St., Sulphur Springs, Benton County, Arkansas
- Coordinates: 36°28′39″N 94°27′41″W
- Area: 3 acres (1.2 ha)
- Built: 1941
- Architect: Cyrus McGown, Claude Mason
- Architectural style: Late 19th And Early 20th Century American Movements, Bungalow/American craftsman
- NRHP reference No.: 01000113
- Added to NRHP: February 16, 2001

The Sulphur Springs Old School Complex Historic District encompasses a collection of connected school buildings at 512 Black Street in Sulphur Springs, Benton County, Arkansas. The main school building is a somewhat vernacular single-story brick structure with a gable-on-hip roof, built in 1941 with funding from the Works Progress Administration. Its main entrance is set in a tall arched opening decorated with buff brick. It is connected via covered walk to the gymnasium, a craftsman-style wood-frame structure with a gable-on-hip roof and novelty siding. The gym was built in 1925 as a military barracks at Camp Crowder in Neosho, Missouri, and was moved to this location in 1948. A wood-frame hyphen connects the gym to the 1949 cafeteria, a vernacular brick building. The school complex was used until 1965 when Sulphur Springs' school were consolidated with those of Gravette. The school now houses the local police department, history museum, and community meeting spaces.

The district was listed on the National Register of Historic Places in 2001.

== See also ==
- Camp Crowder Gymnasium, another recycled barracks from Camp Crowder
- National Register of Historic Places listings in Benton County, Arkansas
