= Shiloh Creek =

Stream in the US state of Missouri

Shiloh Branch is a stream in Bourbon County, Kansas and Vernon County, Missouri. The stream is a tributary to the Marmaton River.

The headwaters arise in Kansas northeast of the community of Hammond at 37°57′15″N 94°40′21″W and the confluence with the Marmaton in Missouri is about three miles southwest of Richards at 37°51′47″N 94°35′11″W.

The creek was named after the ancient city of Shiloh.

== See also ==
- List of rivers of Kansas
- List of rivers of Missouri
