= Experimental system =

In scientific research, an experimental system is the physical, technical and procedural basis for an experiment or series of experiments. Historian of science Hans-Jörg Rheinberger defines an experimental system as: "A basic unit of experimental activity combining local, technical, instrumental, institutional, social, and epistemic aspects." Scientists (particularly laboratory biologists) and historians and philosophers of biology have pointed to the development and spread of successful experimental systems, such as those based on popular model organism or scientific apparatus, as key elements in the history of science, particularly since the early 20th century. The choice of an appropriate experimental system is often seen as critical for a scientist's long-term success, as experimental systems can be very productive for some kinds of questions and less productive for others, acquiring a sort of momentum that takes research in unpredicted directions.

A successful experimental system must be stable and reproducible enough for scientists to make sense of the system's behavior, but variable and unpredictable enough that it can produce useful results. In many cases, a well-understood experimental system can be "black-boxed" as a standard technique, which can then be a component of other experimental systems. Rheinberger divides experimental systems into two parts: the part under investigation ("epistemic things") and the well-understood part that provides a stable context for experimentation ("technical objects").

The development of experimental systems in biology often requires the "domestication" of a particular organism for the laboratory environment, including the creation of relatively homogeneous lines or strains and the tailoring of conditions to highlight the variable aspects that scientists are interested in. Scientific technologies, similarly, often require the development of a full experimental system to go from a viable concept to a technique that works in practice on a usefully consistent basis. For example, the invention of the polymerase chain reaction (PCR) is generally attributed to Kary Mullis, who came up with the concept in 1983, but the process of development of PCR into the revolutionary technology it became by the early 1990s took years of work by others at Cetus Corporation—and the basic components of the system had been known since the 1960s DNA synthesis work of Har Gobind Khorana—making "who invented PCR?" a complicated question.

== See also ==
- Epistemology
- Experiment
- Experimental design
- History of science
- Laboratory
- Model organism
- Philosophy of science
- Polymerase chain reaction
- Reproducibility
- Scientific instrument
- Scientific method
- Scientific research
