= Shiloh, Stafford County, Virginia =

Shiloh
- Unincorporated community
- Location within the State of Virginia Shiloh (Virginia) Shiloh (the United States)
- Coordinates: 38°30′10″N 77°30′15″W
- Country: United States
- State: Virginia
- County: Stafford
- Time zone: UTC−5 (Eastern (EST))
  - Summer (DST): UTC−4 (EDT)

Shiloh is an unincorporated community in Stafford County, in the U.S. state of Virginia.
