= Camp Crowder Gymnasium =

- U.S. National Register of Historic Places
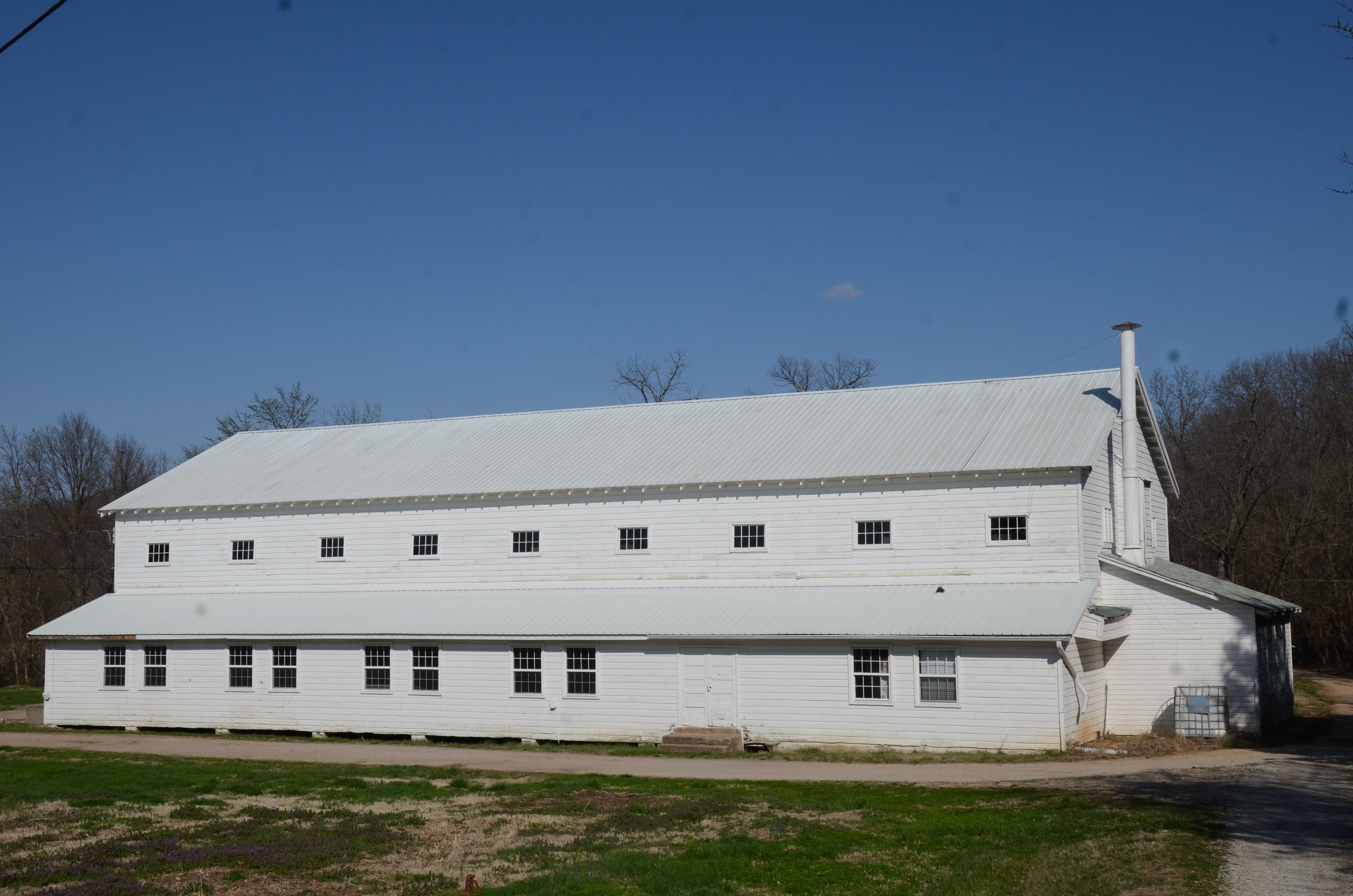

- Location within Arkansas Location within the United States
- Location: 205 Shiloh Drive, Sulphur Springs, Benton County, Arkansas
- Coordinates: 36°8′30″N 92°46′51″W
- Area: 4.6 acres (1.9 ha)
- NRHP reference No.: 11000685
- Added to NRHP: September 23, 2011

The Camp Crowder Gymnasium is a historic school building at 205 Shiloh Drive in Sulphur Springs, Benton County, Arkansas. It is primarily a building with local significance, and also is a rare example of military construction in the small community.

The building was listed on the National Register of Historic Places in 2011.

== History ==
=== 1940s‒1946: Camp Crowder, Neosho, Missouri ===
The gymnasium was built in the early 1940s at the Camp Crowder military base in Neosho, Missouri for military troops to use as a gymnasium and theater.

In June 1946, the US War Assets Administration sold buildings and surplus war materials at two Kansas locations and at Camp Crowder in Missouri. At the public sale attended by 2,900 people, they sold 1,004 buildings. John Elward Brown Sr. bought the gymnasium for the Brown Military Academy of the Ozarks.

The gymnasium was disassembled and moved to the academy.

=== 1946‒1951: Brown Military Academy of the Ozarks ===
John Elward Brown Sr. established John Brown University is Siloam Springs, Arkansas and in 1924 he also established another school in nearby Sulphur Springs. That school changed names and goals several times over the next decade but in 1937, it became the Brown Military Academy of the Ozarks, a co-educational military academy for high school students. The campus included the former 100-room Kihlberg hotel and the former 30-room Livingston hotel.

Brown bought the gymnasium and it was reassembled on the academy's campus for use as a gymnasium and school theater. However, the academy was not performing well financially and in 1951 Brown closed it and sold the campus for a small amount of money to William Cameron Townsend.

=== 1951‒1964: Camp Wycliffe (SIL International) ===
In 1935, shortly before Brown changed his Sulphur Springs school to a military academy, William Cameron Townsend started Camp Wycliffe (later named Summer Institute of Linguistics, or SIL International at a farmhouse in Sulphur Springs. The summer camp trained people in linguistics and Biblical translation, and to prepare them to become missionaries in other countries―from phonetics and philology, to religious prayer, to making furniture and taking ten-mile hikes around the area.

In the 1950s, SIL International had grown substantially, with training schools in Canada, Australia, and the UK. Brown sold them his entire Sulphur Springs campus to them and his personal off-campus home in the town (Shiloh House), and they used the gymnasium as a recreation hall for the students and faculty there.

In 1964, SIL International prepared to move their headquarters to Huntington Beach, California and sold the property to Copeland Development, which went bankrupt. In 1968, it was sold to Shiloh Trust.

=== 1968‒2017: Shiloh Church and Trust ===
Shiloh Communities was founded by Rev. Eugene E. Crosby Monroe in Sherman, New York, in 1942. It was a religious commune for rehabilitating WWII veterans, and the commune supported itself with proceeds from an organic food business, bakery, farm, ranch, and day care school, which were organized under an umbrella corporation named Shiloh Trust.

In 1968, the then-leader James Janisch and Shiloh Communities bought the entire complex from SIL International, including the gymnasium, the two former hotels, and Brown's former personal home, and moved the community and the Shiloh Trust businesses to Sulphur Springs. They were established as Church of Shiloh in 1972, and it became one of the oldest continuously-operating communes in the United States.

The community used the gymnasium building for the day care school, as a skating rink, theater, basketball and volleyball court. Later, they used it for storage, and it fell into disrepair. In 2010, they restored the building. In 2011, it was added to the National Register of Historic Places.

=== 2017‒present: Kim Hendren and Hendren-Hutchinson Christian Ministries ===
In 2017, Kim Hendren and his wife Marylea Hutchinson Hendren bought the Shiloh campus including the gymnasium as well as the two former hotels, and a new church that Shiloh built on the 29-acre property, for $500,000. Under the nonprofit name Hendren-Hutchinson Christian Ministries, Inc., they announced plans to restore the buildings and convert the church to an event conference center. At the time of that announcement, it was suggested that the planned Bella Vista Bypass would revitalize the town and bring people to Hendren's event center as well.

As of 2024, the planned revitalization has not been completed.

== Features ==
The Camp Crowder base was 43,000 acres and had about 1600 buildings on it; most of them were 800 Series designs, which were similar to the 700 Series building designs but used more and larger timbers and were structurally safer. Both series were meant to be temporary construction, and the 800 Series faced some criticism at the time for being too solidly built (and thus more expensive) for temporary buildings.

This gymnasium is an example of typical World War II cantonment construction. It is a 6,576 square foot (611 square meter) weatherboard-clad, wooden frame building, partially on a concrete foundation and partially on concrete piers. It has a metal gable roof and exposed rafter tails on the upper and lower eaves. In 2011, one could still see the large roof trusses and a wooden basketball court inside.

== See also ==
- Sulphur Springs Old School Complex Historic District, another building in Sulphur Springs from Camp Crowder
- Shiloh House (Sulphur Springs, Arkansas), the off-campus home also used by Brown, SIL International, and Shiloh
- Shiloh community's website (archived)
- National Register of Historic Places listings in Benton County, Arkansas
