= Shiloh, Bath County, Virginia =

Unincorporated community in Virginia, United States

Shiloh
- Unincorporated community
- Location within the state of Virginia Shiloh (the United States)
- Coordinates: 38°05′14″N 79°39′02″W
- Country: United States
- State: Virginia
- County: Bath
- Time zone: UTC−5 (Eastern (EST))
  - Summer (DST): UTC−4 (EDT)
- GNIS feature ID: 1673656

Shiloh is an unincorporated community in Bath County, Virginia, United States.
