= The Silo =

Fortnightly agricultural newspaper printed and distributed in Lesotho

The Silo/Sesiu
- Type: Fortnightly newspaper
- Format: Tabloid
- Owner: Facts Media House (PTY) Ltd.
- Publisher: Facts Media House (PTY) Ltd.
- News editor: Tjonane Matla
- Founded: 27 July 2010
- Language: English, Sesotho
- Headquarters: Maseru
- Circulation: 30,000
- Price: M5.00 (Monday-Friday); M 5.00 (Saturday)
- ISSN: 2223-8468
- Website: http://www.thesilo.co.ls

The Silo is a fortnightly agricultural newspaper printed and distributed in Lesotho. The paper mainly publishes environmental and agricultural news occurring in and around the country.

In its 13 July 2011 issue, The Silo featured King Letsie III, presenting the interview as a special edition for the King's birthday celebrations, a public holiday duly observed each year in Lesotho.

As the only agricultural newspaper in the country, The Silo follows in the foot-steps of its predecessors in neighboring South Africa, Farmers Weekly, in that its content is restricted to farming, environmental and agricultural news only.
