= Shiloh, Pulaski County, Virginia =

Unincorporated community in Virginia, US

Coordinates: 37°01′29″N 80°42′51″W

Shiloh is an unincorporated community in Pulaski County, in the U.S. state of Virginia.
