= Maksim Shilo =

Belarusian footballer (born 1993)

Personal information
- Date of birth: 17 April 1993 (age 33)
- Place of birth: Minsk, Belarus
- Height: 1.87 m (6 ft 1 1/2 in)
- Position: Defender

Team information
- Current team: Maxline
- Number: 5

Youth career
- 2007–2008: Darida Minsk Raion
- 2009–2010: Zvezda-BGU Minsk

Senior career*
Years	Team	Apps	(Gls)
2011–2016	Zvezda-BGU Minsk	151	(6)
2017	Slavia Mozyr	20	(0)
2018	Smolevichi	15	(0)
2018	Luch Minsk	12	(0)
2019	Dnyapro Mogilev	26	(0)
2020–2021	Dordoi Bishkek	26	(4)
2022	Minsk	17	(0)
2023–	Maxline	13	(0)
- * Club domestic league appearances and goals as of 31 December 2023

Maksim Shilo (Belarusian: Максім Шыла; Russian: Максим Шило; born 17 April 1993) is a Belarusian professional footballer who plays for Maxline.

== Career ==
During 2020–2021 he played for Dordoi Bishkek in Kyrgyzstan.

== Honours ==
Dordoi Bishkek

- Kyrgyz Premier League champion: 2020, 2021
