= Shiloh, West Virginia =

Shiloh, West Virginia may refer to the following places.

- Shiloh, Hampshire County, West Virginia
- Shiloh, Raleigh County, West Virginia
- Shiloh, Tyler County, West Virginia
