= Margalit Shilo =

Israeli historian (born 1942)

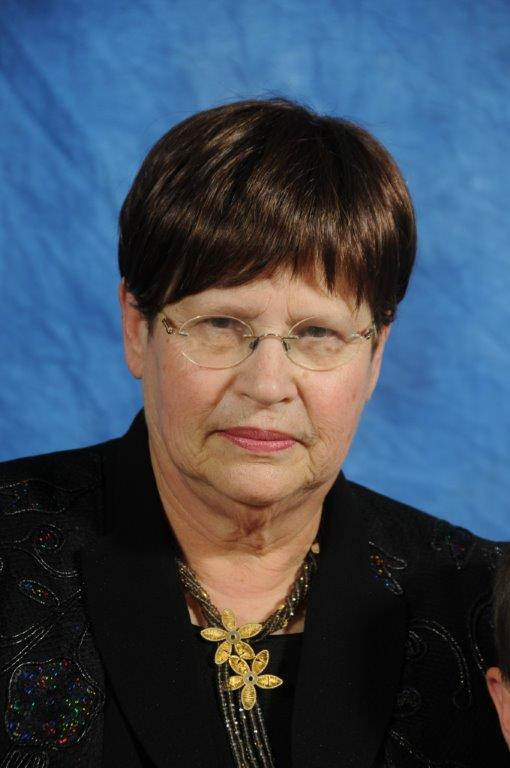
Margalit Shilo

Margalit Shilo (Hebrew: מרגלית שילה; born 1942) is an Israeli historian. Until her retirement, she worked at the Land of Israel Studies and Archeology Department at Bar Ilan University where her area of focus was the Jewish community in pre-state Israel, and women and gender in Israel. She is the author and editor of 12 books and 80 papers.

== Biography ==
Margalit Shilo was born in Rehovot in 1942. Her father was Aron Bondi (he) (1906-1997), a prize-winning Israeli chemist. Her husband was Shmuel Shilo (he) (1936-2016), a law professor at Hebrew University.

== Career ==
Shilo served as a longtime professor at the Martin (Szusz) Department of Land of Israel Studies and Archaeology at Bar Ilan University in Israel. Her research on women and gender in Israel led to her publishing several award-winning books on the topic.

Shilo's book Women Building a Nation is credit for helping to inspire the construction of a new museum showcasing the role of women who helped build the modern State of Israel.

Shilo's research also includes the history of the Hebrew suffragist party, called the Union of Hebrew Women for Equal Rights in Eretz Israel (he), published in her 2013 book titled Battle for the Vote: The Birth of Hebrew Feminism (in Hebrew, “Hama’avak al Ha’kol: Leidato shel Feminism Ivri”). The author illustrates the political activity of women who were mostly neglected from published studies on Israeli history.

== Awards ==
Shilo received the 1988 Ruppin Prize for her book Experiments in Settlement. In 2000, she received the Bahat Prize for her Hebrew edition of Princess or Prisoner?: Jewish women in Jerusalem, 1840-1914.

== Books ==
- Experiments in Settlement:(The Palestine Office 1908-1914 ), Yad Izhak Ben-Zvi Press (1988) [Hebrew]
- Voices of Jerusalem: Writings of Jewish Women of the Nineteenth Century, Hebrew University (2003) [Hebrew]
- Princess or Prisoner?: Jewish women in Jerusalem, 1840-1914, Brandeis University Press (2005) [Hebrew edition published in 2001]
- New Jewish Feminism: Probing the Past, Forging the Future (2008)
- Battle for the Vote: The Birth of Hebrew Feminism (2013)
- Girls of Liberty: The Struggle for Suffrage in Mandatory Palestine Brandeis University Press (2016)
