= Shiloh High School =

Shiloh High School may mean:

- Shiloh High School (Alabama) in Sardis, Dallas County, and which closed in favor of Sardis High School
- Shiloh High School (Georgia) in Snellville, Gwinnett County
- Shiloh High School (Illinois) in Shiloh Community Unit School District 1 in Hume, Edgar County
