= Silo (restaurant) =

- Interactive map of Silo

Restaurant information
- Established: 2014; 12 years ago
- Closed: 20 December 2025; 9 months ago
- Chef: Douglas McMaster
- Food type: Experimental cuisine
- Location: London, England
- Coordinates: 51.5429°N 0.0221°W
- Website: silolondon.com

Silo was a zero waste restaurant in London. It served a menu based on sustainable and foraged ingredients, and used recyclable materials for packaging and interior decor. The restaurant was opened by chef Douglas McMaster in Brighton in 2014, before relocating to London in 2019. It closed on 20 December 2025.

== Description ==
The restaurant was intended to produce zero waste. All of its produce was purchased from local farms and transported in biodegradable or reusable packaging. The restaurant also grew its own mushrooms, milled its own flour and churned its own butter. Leftovers and by-products from the cooking process were incorporated into other dishes to reduce food waste. For example, buttermilk from the butter-making process was used to make ice cream, leftover breadcrumbs were used to coat ice cream sandwiches, and leftover parts from cooked cuttlefish were fermented into a fish sauce. Any food that was not eaten was composted and distributed to farms.

=== Menu ===
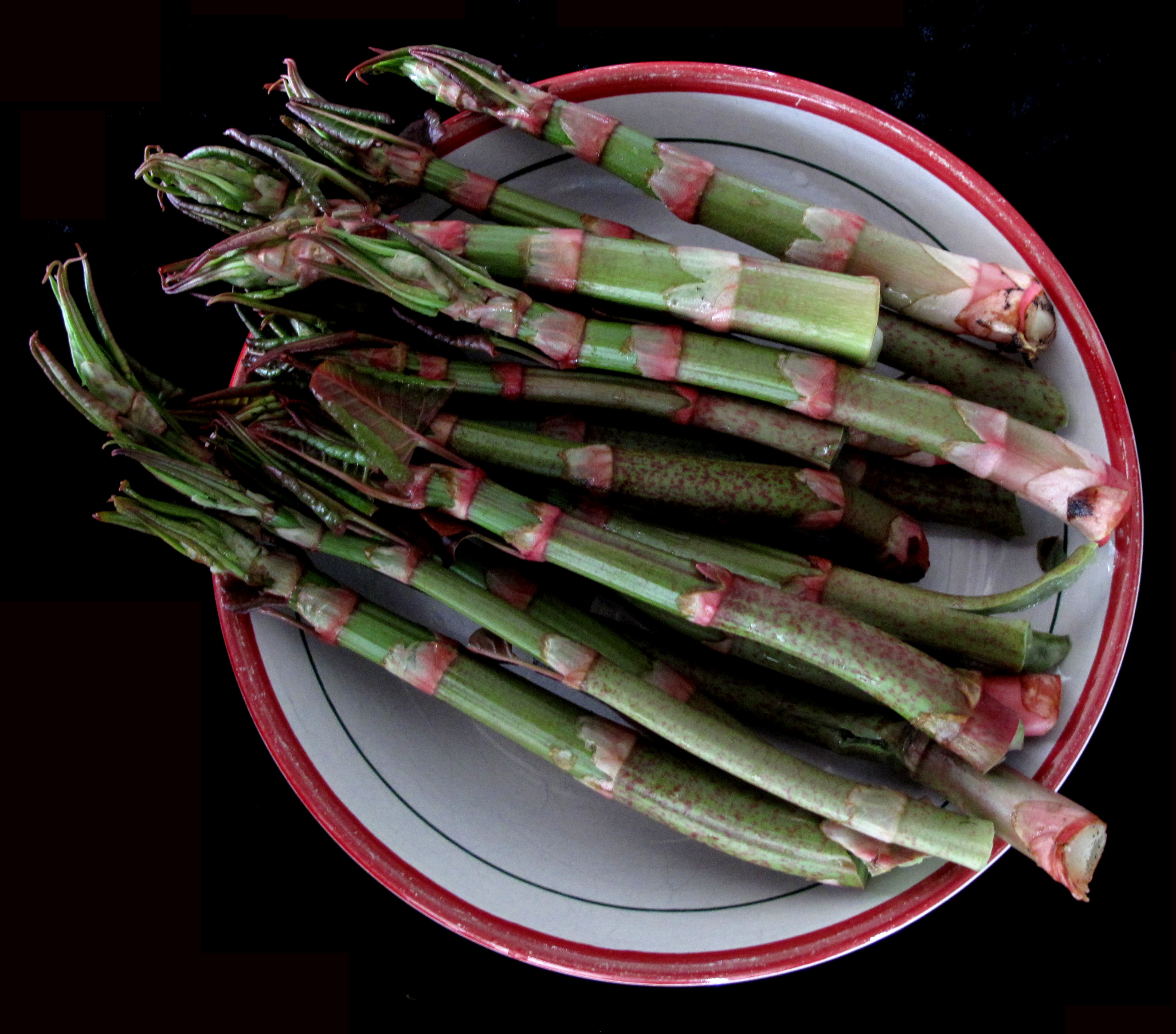
Japanese knotweed (pictured) was served at Silo.

The Brighton restaurant offered diners a selection of appetizers, entrees and desserts, with a choice of vegetarian, omnivorous and meat-based dishes. After relocating to London, the restaurant served a set menu of tasting dishes so that it could predict exactly how many ingredients to order, thereby reducing waste. The menu changed regularly, based on what ingredients were in season. Its signature dish was a sourdough bread called the "Siloaf". The sourdough was made from a mixture of wheat and rye, and was proved for 48 hours. Invasive species were frequently served, such as Japanese knotweed, and Mediterranean octopus. The menu focused on plant ingredients, although meat from sources like culled deer and retired dairy cattle was also incorporated. Servers explained the supply chain and cooking process to each diner.

In 2019, food critic Keith Miller described a meal at Silo as "beetroot with perfumed Mexican marigold; an obscure short-rib-like cut of superannuated dairy cow, cooked unimaginably slowly then served with 'emerald kale', the leaves whizzed into a sauce, the stalks sliced thin and crisped up like winter trees; a quince sorbet crowned with a puddle of fig-leaf oil the impossibly intense iridescent greeny-blue of a peacock’s tail."

=== Interior ===
The original Brighton restaurant occupied a 180 year-old building that had housed a grocery store until 2012. The restaurant had a sparsely decorated brick and wood interior with bare lightbulb fixtures, chairs made from wood pulp paste, and metal tables. It had an open kitchen where diners could observe food being prepared. Food critic Giles Coren compared its aesthetics to the settings of Cormac McCarthy's post-apocalyptic novel The Road (2006) and Paul Kingsnorth's Medieval novel The Wake (2014).

The restaurant's bathrooms had "intelligent" taps that offered two decontaminating streams of water, which eliminated the need for soap. The tap would be illuminated with blue light during the first stream, which contained alkaline water to remove contaminants. The light turned red during the second stream, which contained acidic water that killed bacteria. Food critic Marina O'Loughlin observed that when she went to the bathroom, "electrolyse the water, so when you go to the loo, there’s no soap: instead, flashing red and blue lights whip everything into cleanliness with technology I signally fail to understand."

After the restaurant relocated to London in 2019 it was located in a former candy factory. Its interior was decorated with recycled materials, including cork floors, recycled lighting and lampshades made from mycelium-based materials. Its dishes were also made of recycled materials, including tableware made from recycled wine bottles that were ground into glass sand and melted in a kiln. The restaurant's tables and bar seating were adjacent to an open kitchen where diners could observe the food being prepared. The bar surface and tabletops were made from recycled plastic.

== History ==
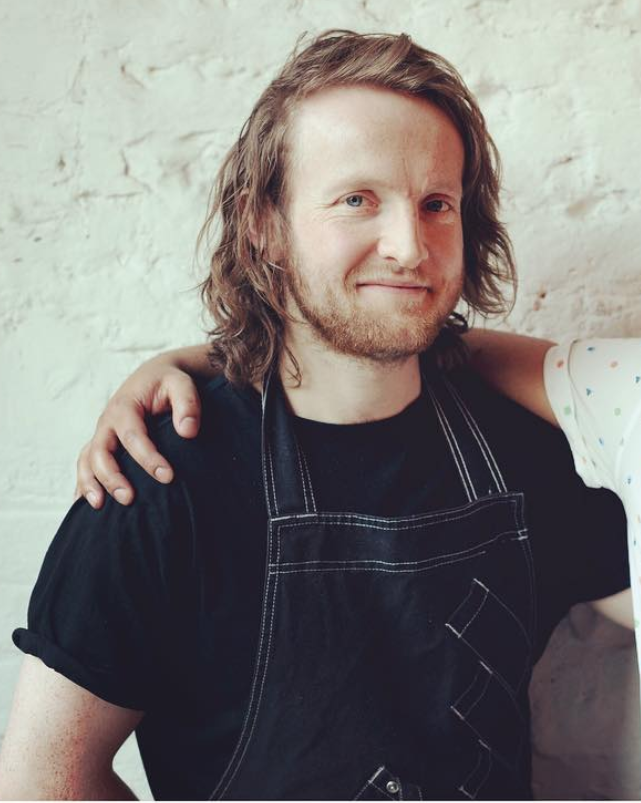
Douglas McMaster in 2017

Silo was opened in Brighton in 2014 by chef Douglas McMaster. McMaster had previously worked at restaurants including Noma and The Fat Duck. He had worked with Joost Bakker, the founder of Greenhouse, to open a zero-waste cafe in Melbourne, Australia called "Silo by Joost". McMaster raised £40,000 through crowdfunding to establish a zero-carbon supply chain for the Brighton restaurant.

The restaurant drew criticism from locals in Brighton for perceived high prices and a "pretentious" atmosphere, with particular complaints about the use of recycled jars as beverage glasses. In a 2017 interview with Big Hospitality magazine, McMaster said that Brighton's food culture was not complex enough for the restaurant to thrive, and that he had to "dumb down" his ideas to make them suitable for locals. His comments drew backlash from locals.

He responded to the controversy in a subsequent interview with The Argus, where he stated that "It breaks my heart that people think I don’t love Brighton", and said that he hoped the restaurant would remain in the city for another 20 years. McMaster also objected to complaints about the use of jars, noting that the restaurant had already discontinued them.

The restaurant relocated to London in 2019, where it opened in Hackney Wick. The move was funded through a £500,000 crowdfunding campaign. McMaster stated that the restaurant's London opening was easier than its original opening, which he attributed to an increase in public environmental awareness in the intervening years. He claimed that this increased awareness was partially the result of environmentally-focused media like the David Attenborough documentary Blue Planet II, which indirectly drove foot traffic to the restaurant. The restaurant closed in December 2025, with its final service on December 20.

== Reception ==
=== Brighton, 2014–2019 ===
In 2015, the restaurant received mostly positive reviews from critics. Giles Coren, reviewing the restaurant for The Times, gave the food a mostly positive score but criticized the use of jars as beverage glasses. John Walsh of The Independent praised the creative menu items and use of foraged ingredients. In a review for The Guardian, Marina O'Loughlin gave the Brighton restaurant a score of 6/10 for food, 7/10 for atmosphere, 8/10 for price and 10/10 for ethos.

A 2016 review from Brighton newspaper The Argus gave it 5/5 stars for the food, service, and overall restaurant. Victoria Stewart, writing for The Telegraph, gave the food a mostly positive review while describing it as a "low-key hippyish place".

=== London, 2019–2025 ===
In 2019, Keith Miller of The Telegraph gave the restaurant 4.5/5 stars, praising the quality of the food, atmosphere and service. In a review that same year, food critic Jimi Famurewa praised the restaurant as "a place where spellbinding, veg-focused cooking is served by passionate, engaged people."

Grace Dent of The Guardian gave the restaurant a more negative review in 2020, giving it 3/10 stars and writing that "With every course, a server arrives, calls you 'folks', kneels down, proffers a tiny sliver of radish with a small fart of hemp cheese goo inside, before talking you through the lifespan of the radish and the seasonings."

The restaurant received a Michelin Guide green star for sustainability in 2021.

Tania Ballantine of Time Out London gave the restaurant 5/5 stars in 2025, praising its food, sustainability and service. The Standard listed it as one of the most sustainable restaurants in London in 2025. Sonya Barber, writing for Condé Nast Traveler, wrote that "Silo isn’t for everyone, but for anyone feeling adventurous and after an unusual and exciting meal, this is a must-visit."
