= Shiloh Primitive Baptist Church =

Historic church in North Carolina, United States

- U.S. National Register of Historic Places
- Location within North Carolina Location within the United States
- Location: 9495 Brogden Rd., near Brogden, North Carolina
- Coordinates: 35°24′21″N 78°12′41″W
- Area: 4.4 acres (1.8 ha)
- Built: c. 1920
- Architectural style: Late 19th And Early 20th Century American Movements, Rural Ecclesiastical
- NRHP reference No.: 07001498
- Added to NRHP: January 31, 2008

Shiloh Primitive Baptist Church is a historic rural African-American Primitive Baptist church located near Brogden, Johnston County, North Carolina. It was built about 1920, and is a vernacular one-story, gable-front, three-bay, light timber-frame building. The building was also used as a one-room school until the early 1930s. Also on the property is a contributing church cemetery with burials dating from the 1910 to 1987.

It was listed on the National Register of Historic Places in 2008.
