= Shiloh House (Sulphur Springs, Arkansas) =

Historic house in Arkansas, United States

- U.S. National Register of Historic Places
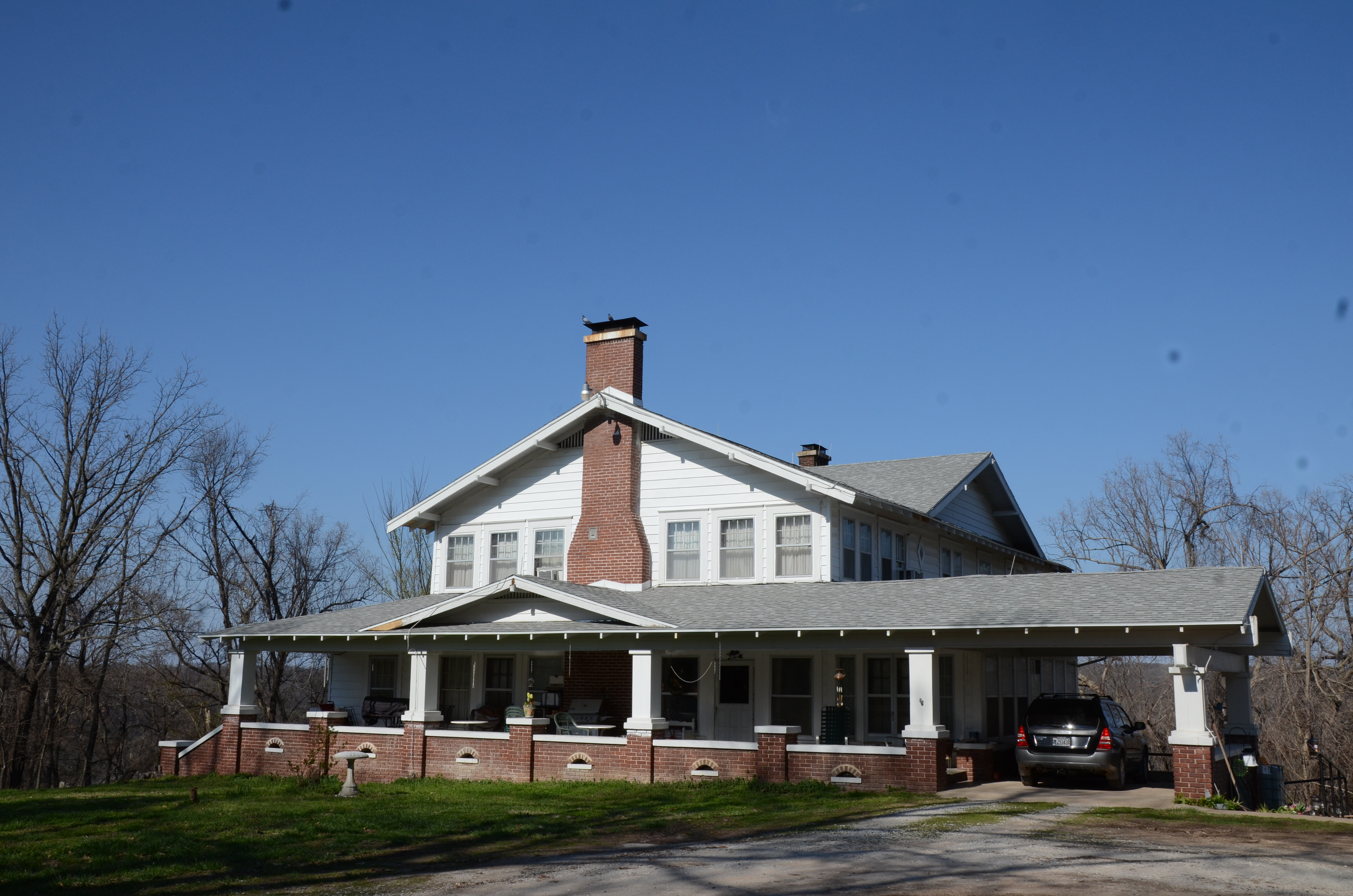

- Location within Arkansas Location within the United States
- Location: 700 Lodge Dr., Sulphur Springs, Benton County, Arkansas
- Coordinates: 36°28′34″N 94°27′16″W
- Area: less than one acre
- Built: 1927
- Architectural style: Bungalow/craftsman
- MPS: Benton County MRA
- NRHP reference No.: 87002364
- Added to NRHP: January 28, 1988

The Shiloh House is a historic house at 700 Lodge Dr. in Sulphur Springs, Benton County, Arkansas. Built in 1927, it is one of the largest examples of Bungalow and Craftsman-style architecture in Benton County.

== History ==
=== 1927‒1951: John Elward Brown ===
In 1924, John E. Brown Sr. had already established a school in nearby Siloam Springs, Arkansas, and he purchased a large number of hotels and businesses in Sulphur Springs to open a second school. He built this home on a hill overlooking what would be the school campus. The home was built with royalties from books he wrote, and although he originally planned a more modest home he added to it until it was much larger than originally planned; one of his evangelistic friends estimated that the building was worth $40,000 (equivalent to almost $700,000 in 2024). As he did when founding the school in Siloam Springs, he deeded his home to the new school.

The large home later became a point of conflict, as some of the town's people accused Brown of valuing the home at only $800 (equivalent to about $14,000 in 2024) to avoid paying more taxes on it. This spurred Brown to have an independent audit conducted to prove his innocence to the community, and the audit's findings that Brown was not guilty of financial improprieties were publicly published.

Brown closed the financially struggling Sulphur Springs school in 1951, and sold the campus and this home for little money, to William Cameron Townsend. His school in Siloam Springs remains today, as John Brown University.

=== 1951‒1964: SIL International ===
William Townsend established the Summer Institute of Linguistics, or SIL International in Sulphur Springs in 1935, to train missionaries in linguistics and Biblical translation. By the 1950s, it had grown substantially and had training schools in several other English-speaking countries. They expanded in Sulphur Springs by buying the entire campus from Brown, including the home.

In 1964, they prepared move to Huntington Beach, California, and sold their Arkansas property. It first sold to a development company that went bankrupt, and then it sold to Shiloh Trust.

=== 1968‒present: Shiloh Church and Trust ===
Shiloh Communities was a religious intentional community in Sherman, New York that supported itself with proceeds from several food-related businesses including a bakery, farm, and ranch, organized as a corporation named Shiloh Trust.

In 1968, looking for a more central area of the country from which to conduct their businesses, Shiloh Communities and Shiloh Trust bought the entire campus and the home. In 1972, they became Church of Shiloh. The home was used as a parsonage.

In 1988, it was added to the National Register of Historic Places. In 2017, Shiloh decided to use it for Shiloh Ministries, to foster boys age 14 to 21, and for a bakery business.

== Features ==
This home is one of the largest examples of Bungalow/Craftsman-style architecture in the county. It is notable for its size, which was quite large for the time and location of its build: the house has a total of almost 5,000 square feet (464.5 square meters), and it sits on an 11.5 acre (4.65 hectare) property.

Set on a steeply sloping lot above Cliff Road, it is two stories at the front and three at the back, with a broad single-story porch which extends over a carport to the right. The porch is supported by supports that are a combination of brick piers and boxed columns, joined by a brick balustrade.

== See also ==
- National Register of Historic Places listings in Benton County, Arkansas
- National Register of Historic Places listings in Arkansas
