= Moshe Shilo =

Moshe Shilo (Hebrew: משה שילה; 1920–1990) was a microbiologist working in the field of aquatic microbiology, at the Hebrew University of Jerusalem. He was influential in the development of modern microbial ecology . He was a life-long member of the American Society for Microbiology and was honored by being appointed their 1967 ONR lecturer, and by receiving the 1978 Fisher Award in Applied and Environmental Microbiology.

His first encounter with aquatic microbiology and with an acute applied problem, came when he started to study the reasons for a 1947 severe outbreak of fish death in artificial fishponds in Israel. He showed that growth of a toxic unicellular phytoflagellate—Prymnesium parvum and the synthesis of their toxins have different optimal requirements. The toxin turned out to be a proteo-lipid containing 15 amino acids, fatty acid and phosphates. This is one of the first toxins to be isolated in Algea and its toxic effects studied (Shilo 1967). The combination of basic research on the regulation and action of the Prymnesium toxins, together with the development of field tests and the appropriate treatment of fishponds by ammonia and copper, eliminated this problem in aquaculture in Israel.

Another set of landmark studies was initiated at the Solar Lake on the edge of the Red Sea, a small unique hypersaline body of water 20 km south of Eilat. The Solar Lake was established as a model for microbial interactions in extreme environments. The major studies included the discovery of anoxygenic photosynthesis in cyanobacteria as a major evolutionary stage in the evolution of photosynthesis, and the diurnal shift between oxygenic and anoxygenic photosynthesis (Cohen et al. 1975). In addition, the studies revealed a Microbial mat—these stratified benthic microbial communities, dominated by cyanobacteria, develop over the bottom of the Solar Lake. Such microbial mats are modern analogs to stromatolites: Precambrian laminated sedimentary rocks, which are the oldest known microfossils (dated to be 3.5 billion years old).

During the last decade of his life, Shilo’s work focused on benthic cyanobacteria. Production of a hydrophobic external surface allows these organisms to adhere to submerged surfaces. Spreading through a planktonic phase occurs by formation of special cells that have a hydrophilic surface and detach from the mother cells, or transient secretion of substances that mask the hydrophobic surface (Fatum & Shilo 1984). These studies have pioneered the current trend in microbiology that focuses on mixed bacterial communities and the dynamic formation and dissociation of biofilms.

Shilo's contributions to science in Israel included some significant contributions to Israel's scientific infrastructure. His major contribution in this field was the establishment of the Department of Microbial Molecular Ecology—in the Faculty of Science at Hebrew University of Jerusalem, the base of his research and teaching. He was pro-rector of the Hebrew University in the 70s. He also founded, in 1949, the laboratory for the study of fish disease in Kibutz Nir David, in close collaboration with his lifelong friend and colleague Shmuel Sarig. In 1964 he chaired a national committee recommending the establishment of a Marine Research Laboratory in Eilat, Israel. This also led to the establishment of "The Israel Oceanographic and Limnological Research Corporation" in 1966.

Moshe Shilo was born in Moscow, and immigrated to Israel in 1933, after spending a decade in Zopot (near Danzig), which was at that time under German jurisdiction. He was an undergraduate at the Hebrew University of Jerusalem. He carried out his M.Sc. studies with Manfred Ashner on the ecology of marine luminescent bacteria, and his Ph.D. (1947) with Aryeh Leo Olitzki on heat labile antigens of Shigella. During the 1948 Arab-Israeli war he served in the siege of Jerusalem in the Intelligence unit of the Jewish paramilitary organization Haganah, and in the Science corps. He did post doctoral studies with Sir Hans Krebs at Oxford, and Roger Stanier at UC Berkeley (1954–1956). During his entire scientific career he was a faculty member of the Hebrew University, Jerusalem, and published over 100 articles in leading scientific journals. Throughout his career he maintained close personal and professional relations with his childhood friend Alexander Keynan, who was also a professor at the Hebrew University. Moshe Shilo married Miriam Goldzweig in 1948, and they subsequently worked together for over two decades on the analysis of Prymnesium toxin. They have two daughters and a son.

== Selected bibliography ==
- Shilo, M. (1967). "Formation and mode of action of algal toxins". Bacteriological Reviews. 31 (3): 180–193. doi:10.1128/mmbr.31.3.180-193.1967. PMC 378282. PMID 4864729.
- Shilo, M. (1969). "Morphological and Physiological Aspects of the Interaction of Bdellovibrio with Host Bacteria". Current Topics in Microbiology and Immunology. Vol. 50. pp. 174–204. doi:10.1007/978-3-642-46169-9_6. ISBN 978-3-642-46171-2. PMID 4907693.
- Padan, E.; Shilo, M. (1973). "Cyanophages–viruses attacking blue-green algae". Bacteriological Reviews. 37 (3): 343–370. doi:10.1128/MMBR.37.3.343-370.1973. PMC 413822. PMID 4202147.
- Cohen, Y.; Jorgensen, B. B.; Padan, E.; Shilo, M. (1975). "Sulphide-dependent anoxygenic photosynthesis in the cyanobacterium Oscillatoria limnetica". Nature. 257 (5526): 489–492. Bibcode:1975Natur.257..489C. doi:10.1038/257489a0.
- Fatum, A.; Shilo, M. (1984). "Hydrophobicity as an adhesion mechanism of benthic cyanobacteria". Applied and Environmental Microbiology. 47 (1): 135–143. Bibcode:1984ApEnM..47..135F. doi:10.1128/aem.47.1.135-143.1984. PMC 239625. PMID 16346453.
