= Mount Shiloh Missionary Baptist Church =

Historic church in North Carolina, United States

- U.S. National Register of Historic Places
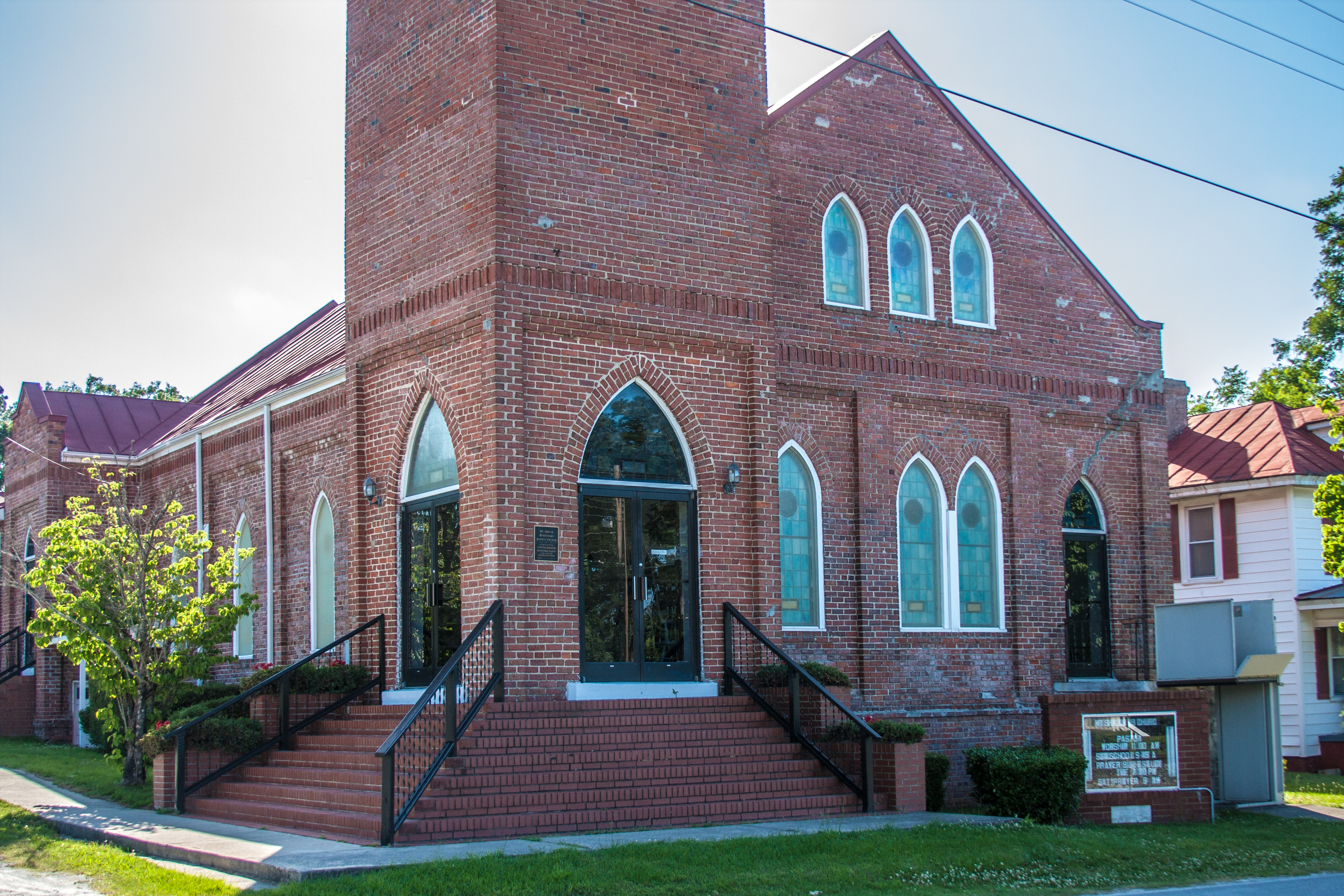

- Location within North Carolina Location within the United States
- Location: 307 Scott St., New Bern, North Carolina
- Coordinates: 35°4′48″N 77°2′18″W
- Area: less than one acre
- Built: 1924
- Built by: Samuel Chapman Elliott
- Architectural style: Late Gothic Revival
- NRHP reference No.: 07000093
- Added to NRHP: March 1, 2007

Mount Shiloh Missionary Baptist Church is a historic African-American Baptist church in New Bern, Craven County, North Carolina. It was built in 1924, and is a one-story, rectangular brick church building on a raised basement in the Late Gothic Revival style. It features a tall projecting, corner tower. A two-story addition for Sunday School classrooms, a kitchen, and dining area was built in the 1970s.

It was listed on the National Register of Historic Places in 2007.
