= Shiloh Township, Edgar County, Illinois =

Shiloh Township
- Township
- Location in Edgar County

- Edgar County's location in Illinois
- Coordinates: 39°44′41″N 87°51′14″W
- Country: United States
- State: Illinois
- County: Edgar

Area
  - Total: 58.23 sq mi (150.8 km^{2})
  - Land: 58.23 sq mi (150.8 km^{2})
  - Water: 0 sq mi (0 km^{2}) 0%
- Elevation: 663 ft (202 m)

Population (2020)
  - Total: 157
  - Density: 2.70/sq mi (1.04/km^{2})
- Time zone: UTC-6 (CST)
  - Summer (DST): UTC-5 (CDT)
- ZIP codes: 61917, 61924, 61932, 61940, 61942, 61944
- FIPS code: 17-045-69498

Shiloh Township is one of fifteen townships in Edgar County, Illinois, USA. As of the 2020 census, its population was 157 and it contained 70 housing units. Shiloh Township was formed from Young America and Edgar townships.

== Geography ==
According to the 2021 census gazetteer files, Shiloh Township has a total area of 58.23 square miles (150.82 km^{2}), all land.

=== Cities, towns, villages ===
- Hume (south edge)

=== Extinct towns ===
- Garland
- Hughes
- Melwood

=== Cemeteries ===
The township contains Payne Cemetery.

=== Major highways ===
- US Route 36
- Illinois Route 49

== Demographics ==
As of the 2020 census there were 157 people, 44 households, and 34 families residing in the township. The population density was 2.70 inhabitants per square mile (1.04/km^{2}). There were 70 housing units at an average density of 1.20 per square mile (0.46/km^{2}). The racial makeup of the township was 94.90% White, 0.00% African American, 0.64% Native American, 0.00% Asian, 0.00% Pacific Islander, 0.64% from other races, and 3.82% from two or more races. Hispanic or Latino of any race were 1.27% of the population.

There were 44 households, out of which 22.70% had children under the age of 18 living with them, 77.27% were married couples living together, 0.00% had a female householder with no spouse present, and 22.73% were non-families. 22.70% of all households were made up of individuals, and 2.30% had someone living alone who was 65 years of age or older. The average household size was 2.00 and the average family size was 2.29.

The township's age distribution consisted of 12.5% under the age of 18, 0.0% from 18 to 24, 0.0% from 25 to 44, 52.3% from 45 to 64, and 35.2% who were 65 years of age or older. The median age was 62.5 years. For every 100 females, there were 125.6 males. For every 100 females age 18 and over, there were 120.0 males.

The median income for a household in the township was $92,000, and the median income for a family was $91,250. Males had a median income of $86,250 versus $41,250 for females. The per capita income for the township was $47,742. None of the population was below the poverty line.

Historical population
Census	Pop.	Note	%±
2010	162		—
2020	157		−3.1%
U.S. Decennial Census

== School districts ==
- Paris Community Unit School District No. 4
- Shiloh Community Unit School District 1

== Political districts ==
- Illinois' 15th congressional district
- State House District 110
- State Senate District 55
