= Edgar Township, Edgar County, Illinois =

Edgar Township
- Township
- Location in Edgar County

- Edgar County's location in Illinois
- Coordinates: 39°44′20″N 87°42′05″W
- Country: United States
- State: Illinois
- County: Edgar
- Established: November 4, 1856

Area
  - Total: 55.46 sq mi (143.6 km^{2})
  - Land: 55.46 sq mi (143.6 km^{2})
  - Water: 0 sq mi (0 km^{2}) 0%
- Elevation: 643 ft (196 m)

Population (2020)
  - Total: 452
  - Density: 8.15/sq mi (3.15/km^{2})
- Time zone: UTC-6 (CST)
  - Summer (DST): UTC-5 (CDT)
- ZIP codes: 61917, 61924, 61940, 61944
- FIPS code: 17-045-22502

Edgar Township is one of fifteen townships in Edgar County, Illinois, USA. As of the 2020 census, its population was 452 and it contained 201 housing units. Previously named Bloomfield Township, it received its current name on May 9, 1857.

== Geography ==
The township is rural, with no incorporated towns or villages. Several unincorporated hamlets (Edgar, Horace, and Bloomfield) are located in the township. The townhouse is located at Edgar. According to the 2021 census gazetteer files, Edgar Township has a total area of 55.46 square miles (143.64 km^{2}), all land.

=== Unincorporated towns ===
- Edgar

=== Extinct towns ===
- Bloomfield
- Horace
- Wetzel

=== Cemeteries ===
The township contains these six cemeteries: Bloomfield, Cherry Point, Franklin, Hoult, McKee and Scott.

=== Historic Locations ===
The Pine Grove Community Club is located in the far south central part of the township. Originally hosting a church and public school, the site still hosts the one-room school building. The school building was in active use until the consolidation of schools around Paris, Illinois into Paris Community Unit School District No. 4 in the late 1940's.

== Demographics ==
As of the 2020 census there were 452 people, 158 households, and 107 families residing in the township. The population density was 8.15 inhabitants per square mile (3.15/km^{2}). There were 201 housing units at an average density of 3.62 units per square mile (1.40 units/km^{2}). The racial makeup of the township was 98.89% White, 0.22% African American, 0.00% Native American, 0.00% Asian, 0.00% Pacific Islander, 0.22% from other races, and 0.66% from two or more races. Hispanic or Latino of any race were 0.44% of the population.

There were 158 households, out of which 20.90% had children under the age of 18 living with them, 62.66% were married couples living together, 5.06% had a female householder with no spouse present, and 32.28% were non-families. 32.30% of all households were made up of individuals, and 16.50% had someone living alone who was 65 years of age or older. The average household size was 1.84 and the average family size was 2.24.

The township's age distribution consisted of 8.9% under the age of 18, 7.2% from 18 to 24, 14% from 25 to 44, 49.2% from 45 to 64, and 20.6% who were 65 years of age or older. The median age was 50.9 years. For every 100 females, there were 129.1 males. For every 100 females age 18 and over, there were 134.5 males.

The median income for a household in the township was $85,750, and the median income for a family was $113,239. Males had a median income of $70,991 versus $29,853 for females. The per capita income for the township was $47,496. No families and 2.4% of the population were below the poverty line, including none of those under age 18 and none of those age 65 or over.

Historical population
Census	Pop.	Note	%±
1930	1,106		—
1940	982		−11.2%
1950	893		−9.1%
1960	794		−11.1%
1970	644		−18.9%
1980	630		−2.2%
1990	547		−13.2%
2000	542		−0.9%
2010	482		−11.1%
2020	452		−6.2%
U.S. Decennial Census

== Transportation ==
The township is served by several major state and federal highways. US Route 36 forms the northern boundary of the township, while Illinois Route 1 and US Route 150 cuts a north–south path through the township. The Edgar County Airport is located in the southeast part of the township. The Decatur & Eastern Illinois Railroad operates a north–south length of railroad track that connects Chrisman and Paris.

== Education ==
The township is served by three school districts: Shiloh Community Unit School District #1, Chrisman-Scottland Community Unit School District #6, and Crestwood Community Unit School District #4.

High school aged students living within Crestwood District #4 attend Paris Cooperative High School.

== Political districts ==
- Illinois's 15th congressional district
- State House District 109
- State Senate District 55
