= Paris Township, Edgar County, Illinois =

Paris Township
- Township
- Location in Edgar County

- Edgar County's location in Illinois
- Coordinates: 39°37′50″N 87°42′34″W
- Country: United States
- State: Illinois
- County: Edgar
- Established: November 4, 1856

Area
  - Total: 45.38 sq mi (117.5 km^{2})
  - Land: 45.00 sq mi (116.5 km^{2})
  - Water: 0.39 sq mi (1.0 km^{2}) 0.85%
- Elevation: 690 ft (210 m)

Population (2020)
  - Total: 9,210
  - Density: 205/sq mi (79.0/km^{2})
- Time zone: UTC-6 (CST)
  - Summer (DST): UTC-5 (CDT)
- ZIP code: 61944
- FIPS code: 17-045-57641

Paris Township is one of fifteen townships in Edgar County, Illinois, United States. As of the 2020 census, its population was 9,210 and it contained 4,629 housing units.

== Geography ==
According to the 2021 census gazetteer files, Paris Township has a total area of 45.38 square miles (117.53 km^{2}), of which 45.00 square miles (116.55 km^{2}) (or 99.15%) is land and 0.39 square miles (1.01 km^{2}) (or 0.85%) is water.

=== Cities, towns, villages ===
- Paris (vast majority)

=== Extinct towns ===
- Harris

=== Cemeteries ===
The township contains these five cemeteries: Conkey, Edgar, Paris Memorial Gardens, Redmon and Saint Marys.

=== Major highways ===
- US Route 150
- Illinois Route 1
- Illinois Route 16
- Illinois Route 133

=== Airports and landing strips ===
- Paris Community Hospital Heliport
- Stewart Airport

== Demographics ==
As of the 2020 census there were 9,210 people, 4,392 households, and 2,760 families residing in the township. The population density was 202.94 inhabitants per square mile (78.36/km^{2}). There were 4,629 housing units at an average density of 102.00 per square mile (39.38/km^{2}). The racial makeup of the township was 95.35% White, 0.50% African American, 0.25% Native American, 0.49% Asian, 0.00% Pacific Islander, 0.73% from other races, and 2.68% from two or more races. Hispanic or Latino of any race were 1.69% of the population.

There were 4,392 households, out of which 27.80% had children under the age of 18 living with them, 44.69% were married couples living together, 13.64% had a female householder with no spouse present, and 37.16% were non-families. 32.40% of all households were made up of individuals, and 15.80% had someone living alone who was 65 years of age or older. The average household size was 2.05 and the average family size was 2.51.

The township's age distribution consisted of 18.9% under the age of 18, 8.8% from 18 to 24, 24.1% from 25 to 44, 26.5% from 45 to 64, and 21.7% who were 65 years of age or older. The median age was 43.9 years. For every 100 females, there were 94.6 males. For every 100 females age 18 and over, there were 94.6 males.

The median income for a household in the township was $43,233, and the median income for a family was $53,382. Males had a median income of $40,618 versus $25,543 for females. The per capita income for the township was $25,455. About 11.3% of families and 13.2% of the population were below the poverty line, including 17.1% of those under age 18 and 7.5% of those age 65 or over.

Historical population
Census	Pop.	Note	%±
2010	9,865		—
2020	9,210		−6.6%
U.S. Decennial Census

== Education ==
Paris Township contains six schools: Carolyn Wenz Elementary School Crestwood School Mayo Middle School Memorial Elementary School, Paris Cooperative High School

=== Public School districts ===
- Paris Community Unit School District No. 4
- Paris Union School District 95

== Political districts ==
- Illinois's 15th congressional district
- State House District 109
- State Senate District 55
