= Symmes Township, Edgar County, Illinois =

Symmes Township
- Township
- Location in Edgar County

- Edgar County's location in Illinois
- Coordinates: 39°31′44″N 87°42′17″W
- Country: United States
- State: Illinois
- County: Edgar
- Established: November 4, 1856

Area
  - Total: 42.38 sq mi (109.8 km^{2})
  - Land: 42.34 sq mi (109.7 km^{2})
  - Water: 0.04 sq mi (0.10 km^{2}) 0.10%
- Elevation: 636 ft (194 m)

Population (2020)
  - Total: 948
  - Density: 22.4/sq mi (8.64/km^{2})
- Time zone: UTC-6 (CST)
  - Summer (DST): UTC-5 (CDT)
- ZIP codes: 61944, 62423, 62441
- FIPS code: 17-045-74288

Symmes Township is one of fifteen townships in Edgar County, Illinois, USA. As of the 2020 census, its population was 948 and it contained 447 housing units. The township was called Marion Township until May 9, 1857.

== Geography ==
According to the 2021 census gazetteer files, Symmes Township has a total area of 42.38 square miles (109.76 km^{2}), of which 42.34 square miles (109.66 km^{2}) (or 99.90%) is land and 0.04 square miles (0.10 km^{2}) (or 0.10%) is water.

=== Cities, towns, villages ===
- Paris (south edge)

=== Unincorporated towns ===
- Oliver

=== Extinct towns ===
- Bell Ridge

=== Cemeteries ===
- Cassady
- Chronic
- Elledge Holley
- Laufman
- Lycan
- New Hope
- O'Hair
- Ogden
- Quinn
- Stephens
- Swango
- Walls
- Zimmerly

=== Major highways ===
- Illinois Route 1

== Demographics ==
As of the 2020 census there were 948 people, 419 households, and 333 families residing in the township. The population density was 22.37 inhabitants per square mile (8.64/km^{2}). There were 447 housing units at an average density of 10.55 per square mile (4.07/km^{2}). The racial makeup of the township was 96.84% White, 0.42% African American, 0.11% Native American, 0.00% Asian, 0.00% Pacific Islander, 0.32% from other races, and 2.32% from two or more races. Hispanic or Latino of any race were 0.32% of the population.

There were 419 households, out of which 27.20% had children under the age of 18 living with them, 73.99% were married couples living together, 3.34% had a female householder with no spouse present, and 20.53% were non-families. 19.10% of all households were made up of individuals, and 17.40% had someone living alone who was 65 years of age or older. The average household size was 2.24 and the average family size was 2.51.

The township's age distribution consisted of 15.1% under the age of 18, 3.7% from 18 to 24, 21.7% from 25 to 44, 35.4% from 45 to 64, and 24.0% who were 65 years of age or older. The median age was 51.0 years. For every 100 females, there were 83.8 males. For every 100 females age 18 and over, there were 92.5 males.

The median income for a household in the township was $61,359, and the median income for a family was $78,029. Males had a median income of $23,606 versus $32,500 for females. The per capita income for the township was $30,534. About 5.4% of families and 6.1% of the population were below the poverty line, including 0.0% of those under age 18 and 12.4% of those age 65 or over.

Historical population
Census	Pop.	Note	%±
2010	1,158		—
2020	948		−18.1%
US Decennial Census

== School districts ==
- Paris Community Unit School District No. 4
- Paris Union School District 95

== Political districts ==
- Illinois's 15th congressional district
- State House District 109
- State Senate District 55
