= Hunter Township, Edgar County, Illinois =

Hunter Township
- Township
- Location in Edgar County

- Edgar County's location in Illinois
- Coordinates: 39°40′17″N 87°35′05″W
- Country: United States
- State: Illinois
- County: Edgar

Area
  - Total: 30.27 sq mi (78.4 km^{2})
  - Land: 30.23 sq mi (78.3 km^{2})
  - Water: 0.04 sq mi (0.10 km^{2}) 0.15%
- Elevation: 643 ft (196 m)

Population (2020)
  - Total: 232
  - Density: 7.67/sq mi (2.96/km^{2})
- Time zone: UTC-6 (CST)
  - Summer (DST): UTC-5 (CDT)
- ZIP codes: 61924, 61944
- FIPS code: 17-045-36685

Hunter Township is one of fifteen townships in Edgar County, Illinois, USA. As of the 2020 census, its population was 232 and it contained 104 housing units. Hunter Township was formed from portions of Stratton Township and Brouilletts Creek Township on an unknown date.

== Geography ==
According to the 2021 census gazetteer files, Hunter Township has a total area of 30.27 square miles (78.40 km^{2}), of which 30.23 square miles (78.30 km^{2}) (or 99.85%) is land and 0.04 square miles (0.10 km^{2}) (or 0.15%) is water.

=== Extinct towns ===
- Clays Prairie
- Huffmanville

=== Cemeteries ===
The township contains these seven cemeteries: Blackman, Bright, Bruce, Cook, Saint Aloysius, Sixteen and Stafford-Crimmons.

== Demographics ==
As of the 2020 census there were 232 people, 40 households, and 32 families residing in the township. The population density was 7.66 inhabitants per square mile (2.96/km^{2}). There were 104 housing units at an average density of 3.44 per square mile (1.33/km^{2}). The racial makeup of the township was 98.28% White, 0.00% African American, 0.43% Native American, 0.43% Asian, 0.00% Pacific Islander, 0.00% from other races, and 0.86% from two or more races. Hispanic or Latino of any race were 0.00% of the population.

There were 40 households, out of which 22.50% had children under the age of 18 living with them, 80.00% were married couples living together, none had a female householder with no spouse present, and 20.00% were non-families. 20.00% of all households were made up of individuals, and 20.00% had someone living alone who was 65 years of age or older. The average household size was 3.03 and the average family size was 3.53.

The township's age distribution consisted of 23.1% under the age of 18, 1.7% from 18 to 24, 0% from 25 to 44, 42.1% from 45 to 64, and 33.1% who were 65 years of age or older. The median age was 56.4 years. For every 100 females, there were 44.0 males. For every 100 females age 18 and over, there were 66.1 males.

The median income for a household in the township was $106,667, and the median income for a family was $115,278. The per capita income for the township was $34,245. None of the population was below the poverty line.

Historical population
Census	Pop.	Note	%±
2010	250		—
2020	232		−7.2%
U.S. Decennial Census

== School districts ==
- Edgar County Community Unit District 6
- Paris Community Unit School District No. 4

== Political districts ==
- Illinois' 15th congressional district
- State House District 109
- State Senate District 55
