= Prairie Township, Edgar County, Illinois =

Prairie Township
- Township
- Location in Edgar County

- Edgar County's location in Illinois
- Coordinates: 39°50′26″N 87°35′27″W
- Country: United States
- State: Illinois
- County: Edgar
- Established: November 4, 1856

Area
  - Total: 35.98 sq mi (93.2 km^{2})
  - Land: 35.97 sq mi (93.2 km^{2})
  - Water: 0.01 sq mi (0.026 km^{2}) 0.03%
- Elevation: 643 ft (196 m)

Population (2020)
  - Total: 222
  - Density: 6.17/sq mi (2.38/km^{2})
- Time zone: UTC-6 (CST)
  - Summer (DST): UTC-5 (CDT)
- ZIP codes: 61870, 61924
- FIPS code: 17-045-61483

Prairie Township is one of fifteen townships in Edgar County, Illinois, USA. As of the 2020 census, its population was 222 and it contained 107 housing units.

== Geography ==
According to the 2021 census gazetteer files, Prairie Township has a total area of 35.98 square miles (93.19 km^{2}), of which 35.97 square miles (93.16 km^{2}) (or 99.97%) is land and 0.01 square miles (0.03 km^{2}) (or 0.03%) is water.

=== Unincorporated towns ===
- Scottland
- Raven

=== Extinct towns ===
- Illiana
- Quaker

=== Cemeteries ===
- Wesley Chapel Cemetery.

=== Major highways ===
- US Route 36
- US Route 150
- Illinois Route 1

=== Airports and landing strips ===
- Rowe Airport

== Demographics ==
As of the 2020 census there were 222 people, 104 households, and 77 families residing in the township. The population density was 6.17 inhabitants per square mile (2.38/km^{2}). There were 107 housing units at an average density of 2.97 per square mile (1.15/km^{2}). The racial makeup of the township was 95.95% White, 0.00% African American, 0.00% Native American, 0.00% Asian, 0.00% Pacific Islander, 0.90% from other races, and 3.15% from two or more races. Hispanic or Latino of any race were 0.90% of the population.

There were 104 households, out of which 19.20% had children under the age of 18 living with them, 74.04% were married couples living together, 0.00% had a female householder with no spouse present, and 25.96% were non-families. 18.30% of all households were made up of individuals, and 11.50% had someone living alone who was 65 years of age or older. The average household size was 2.27 and the average family size was 2.60.

The township's age distribution consisted of 16.1% under the age of 18, 3.8% from 18 to 24, 22.5% from 25 to 44, 31% from 45 to 64, and 26.7% who were 65 years of age or older. The median age was 48.4 years. For every 100 females, there were 112.6 males. For every 100 females age 18 and over, there were 108.4 males.

The median income for a household in the township was $85,588, and the median income for a family was $86,397. Males had a median income of $61,094 versus $36,111 for females. The per capita income for the township was $38,883. About 0.0% of families and 1.7% of the population were below the poverty line, including 0.0% of those under age 18 and 6.3% of those age 65 or over.

Historical population
| Census | Pop. | Note | %± |
|---|---|---|---|
| 2010 | 273 | | — |
| 2020 | 222 | | −18.7% |
US Decennial Census

== School districts ==
- Edgar County Community Unit District 6
- Georgetown-Ridge Farm Consolidated Unit School District 4

== Political districts ==
- Illinois's 15th congressional district
- State House District 109
- State Senate District 55
