= Edgar County, Illinois =

County in Illinois, United States

- County
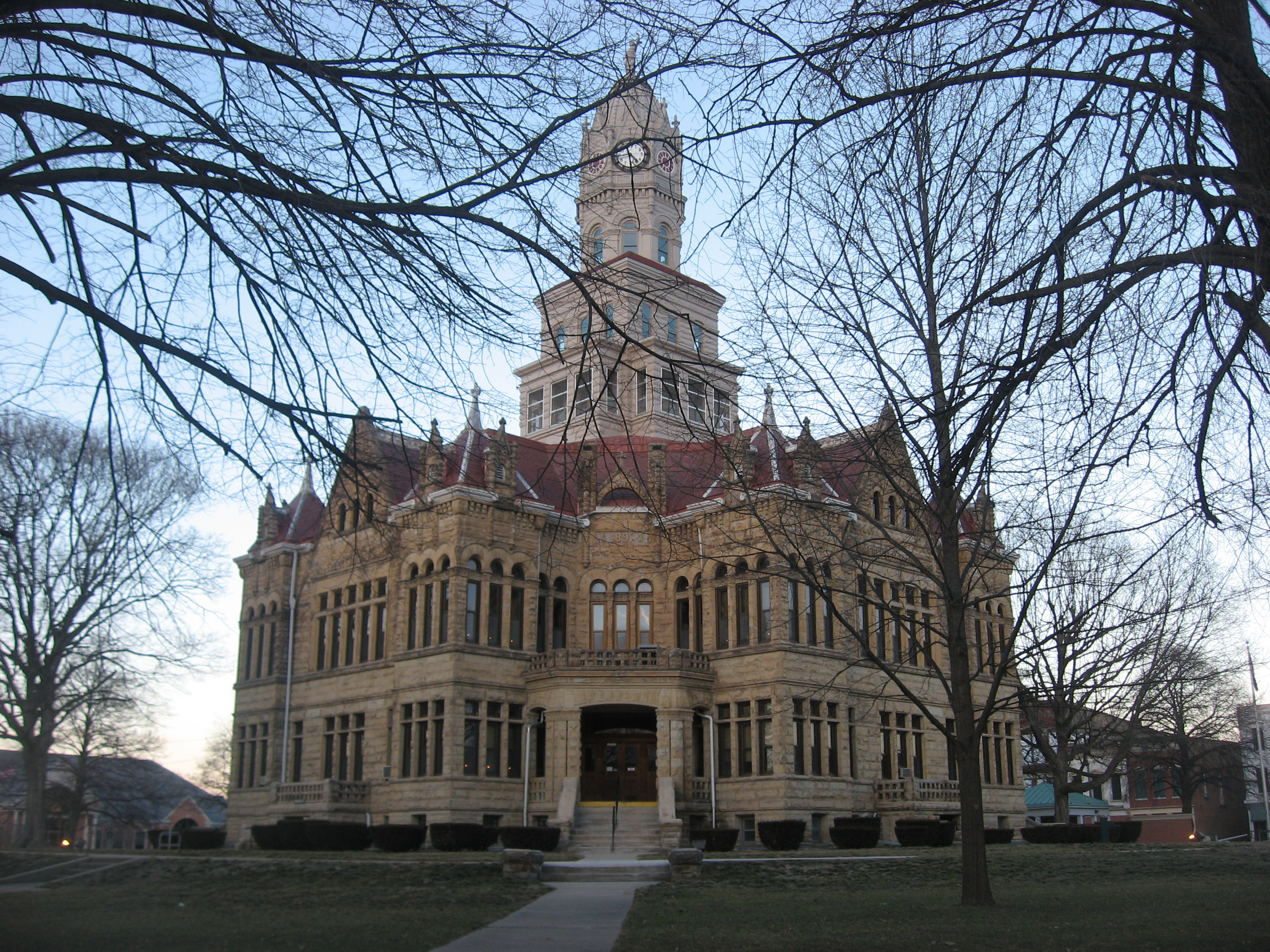
- Edgar County Courthouse

- Seal

- Location within the U.S. state of Illinois
- Coordinates: 39°41′N 87°45′W
- Country: United States
- State: Illinois
- Founded: January 3, 1823
- Named for: John Edgar
- Seat: Paris
- Largest city: Paris

Area
  - Total: 624 sq mi (1,620 km^{2})
  - Land: 623 sq mi (1,610 km^{2})
  - Water: 0.6 sq mi (1.6 km^{2}) 0.1%

Population (2020)
  - Total: 16,866
  - Estimate (2025): 16,323 ▼
  - Density: 27.1/sq mi (10.5/km^{2})
- Time zone: UTC−6 (Central)
  - Summer (DST): UTC−5 (CDT)
- Congressional district: 15th
- Website: edgarcountyillinois.com

Edgar County is a county located in the U.S. state of Illinois. As of the 2020 United States census, the population was 16,866. Its county seat is Paris.

== History ==
Edgar County was formed out of Clark County in 1823. It was named for John Edgar, an Irish-born officer in the Royal Navy who resigned rather than fight against the Americans in the Revolutionary War. Edgar moved to Kaskaskia, Illinois, in 1784, becoming a miller and merchant in that town.

Bloomfield started as a watering point for livestock, but during the 1840s, it became a thriving town along the highway between Vincennes, Indiana, and Chicago. In 1872, the Chicago, Danville and Vincennes Railroad bypassed the town by a mile to the west. As a result, the town's businesses moved to Edgar, beginning Bloomfield's decline.

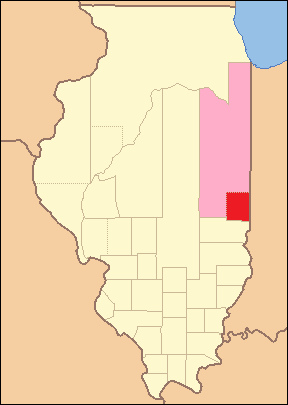
Edgar County (1823), with unorganized territory attached to it.

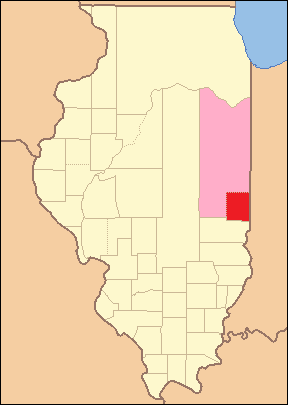
Edgar County (1825–1826)

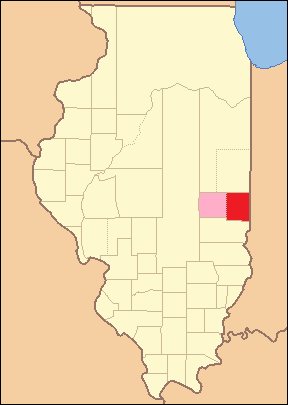
Edgar County (1826–1830)

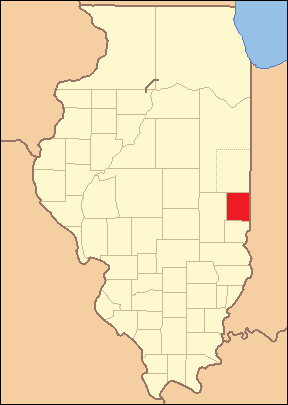
Edgar County (1830–present), with the additional territory incorporated into Coles County

== Geography ==
According to the US Census Bureau, the county has a total area of 624 square miles (1,620 km^{2}), of which 623 square miles (1,610 km^{2}) is land and 0.6 square miles (1.6 km^{2}) (0.1%) is water.

There is one recreational area in the county, on the north edge of Paris. Twin Lakes Park and Reservoir began in 1895 upon completion of the dam compounding the Twin Lakes Reservoir.

=== Climate and weather ===
Paris, Illinois

Climate chart (precipitation, max. and min. temperature)
J	F	M	A	M	J	J	A	S	O	N	D
2.2 34 16	2.2 40 21	3.3 51 31	4 63 41	4.3 74 51	4.2 83 61	4.4 86 65	4.4 84 62	2.9 78 55	2.8 66 43	3.7 51 33	3.1 39 22
- █ Average max. and min. temperatures in °F
- █ Precipitation totals in inches
- Source: The Weather Channel
Metric conversion
J	F	M	A	M	J	J	A	S	O	N	D
57 1 −9	57 4 −6	83 11 −1	101 17 5	109 23 11	108 28 16	113 30 18	112 29 17	75 26 13	71 19 6	93 11 1	79 4 −6
- █ Average max. and min. temperatures in °C
- █ Precipitation totals in mm

In recent years, average temperatures in the county seat of Paris have ranged from a low of 16 °F (−9 °C) in January to a high of 86 °F (30 °C) in July, although a record low of −23 °F (−31 °C) was recorded in January 1930 and a record high of 109 °F (43 °C) was recorded in July 1936. Average monthly precipitation ranged from 2.23 inches (57 mm) in January to 4.43 inches (113 mm) in July.

=== Adjacent counties ===
- Vermilion County – north
- Vermillion County, Indiana – northeast
- Vigo County, Indiana – southeast
- Clark County – south
- Coles County – southwest
- Douglas County – west
- Champaign County – northwest

== Transportation ==
=== Major highways ===
- US Route 36
- US Route 150
- Illinois Route 1
- Illinois Route 16
- Illinois Route 49
- Illinois Route 133

=== Rail ===
Three railroad lines run through the county. Two are operated by CSX Transportation and the third by the Eastern Illinois Railroad Company.

=== Transit ===
- Rides Mass Transit District

=== Airport ===
The county contains one public-use airport: Edgar County Airport (PRG), six miles (10 km) north of Paris.

== Demographics ==
Historical population
Census	Pop.	Note	%±
1830	4,071		—
1840	8,225		102.0%
1850	10,692		30.0%
1860	16,925		58.3%
1870	21,450		26.7%
1880	25,499		18.9%
1890	26,787		5.1%
1900	28,273		5.5%
1910	27,336		−3.3%
1920	25,769		−5.7%
1930	24,966		−3.1%
1940	24,430		−2.1%
1950	23,407		−4.2%
1960	22,550		−3.7%
1970	21,591		−4.3%
1980	21,725		0.6%
1990	19,595		−9.8%
2000	19,704		0.6%
2010	18,576		−5.7%
2020	16,866		−9.2%
2025 (est.)	16,323	▼	−3.2%
US Decennial Census; 1790-1960 1900–1990; 1990-2000 2010–2013

2000 census age pyramid for Edgar County

=== 2020 census ===
As of the 2020 census, the county had a population of 16,866 and a median age of 45.5 years. 20.6% of residents were under the age of 18 and 23.1% of residents were 65 years of age or older. For every 100 females there were 95.5 males, and for every 100 females age 18 and over there were 93.3 males age 18 and over.

The racial makeup of the county was 95.3% White, 0.5% Black or African American, 0.2% American Indian and Alaska Native, 0.3% Asian, <0.1% Native Hawaiian and Pacific Islander, 0.6% from some other race, and 3.1% from two or more races. Hispanic or Latino residents of any race comprised 1.3% of the population.

49.3% of residents lived in urban areas, while 50.7% lived in rural areas.

There were 7,246 households in the county, of which 26.0% had children under the age of 18 living in them. Of all households, 45.6% were married-couple households, 19.7% were households with a male householder and no spouse or partner present, and 26.9% were households with a female householder and no spouse or partner present. About 32.4% of all households were made up of individuals and 16.1% had someone living alone who was 65 years of age or older.

There were 8,236 housing units, of which 12.0% were vacant. Among occupied housing units, 72.2% were owner-occupied and 27.8% were renter-occupied. The homeowner vacancy rate was 2.4% and the rental vacancy rate was 11.1%.

=== Racial and ethnic composition ===
Edgar County, Illinois – Racial and ethnic composition Note: the US Census treats Hispanic/Latino as an ethnic category. This table excludes Latinos from the racial categories and assigns them to a separate category. Hispanics/Latinos may be of any race.
Race / Ethnicity (NH = Non-Hispanic)	Pop 1980	Pop 1990	Pop 2000	Pop 2010	Pop 2020	% 1980	% 1990	% 2000	% 2010	% 2020
White alone (NH)	21,506	19,427	19,052	18,142	16,005	98.99%	99.14%	96.69%	97.66%	94.90%
Black or African American alone (NH)	54	68	362	63	82	0.25%	0.35%	1.84%	0.34%	0.49%
Native American or Alaska Native alone (NH)	16	24	26	23	17	0.07%	0.12%	0.13%	0.12%	0.10%
Asian alone (NH)	37	24	34	33	51	0.17%	0.12%	0.17%	0.18%	0.30%
Native Hawaiian or Pacific Islander alone (NH)	x	x	2	3	0	x	x	0.01%	0.02%	0.00%
Other race alone (NH)	7	0	3	2	33	0.03%	0.00%	0.02%	0.01%	0.20%
Mixed race or Multiracial (NH)	x	x	71	123	453	x	x	0.36%	0.66%	2.69%
Hispanic or Latino (any race)	105	52	154	187	225	0.48%	0.27%	0.78%	1.01%	1.33%
Total	21,725	19,595	19,704	18,576	16,866	100.00%	100.00%	100.00%	100.00%	100.00%

=== 2010 census ===
As of the 2010 United States census, there were 18,576 people, 7,839 households, and 5,148 families residing in the county. The population density was 29.8 inhabitants per square mile (11.5/km^{2}). There were 8,803 housing units at an average density of 14.1 per square mile (5.4/km^{2}). The racial makeup of the county was 98.3% white, 0.3% black or African American, 0.2% Asian, 0.1% American Indian, 0.3% from other races, and 0.7% from two or more races. Those of Hispanic or Latino origin made up 1.0% of the population. In terms of ancestry, 23.6% were German, 15.3% were Irish, 13.0% were English, and 12.3% were American.

Of the 7,839 households, 28.5% had children under the age of 18 living with them, 50.3% were married couples living together, 10.7% had a female householder with no husband present, 34.3% were non-families, and 29.5% of all households were made up of individuals. The average household size was 2.33 and the average family size was 2.84. The median age was 43.2 years.

The median income for a household in the county was $39,904 and the median income for a family was $51,588. Males had a median income of $38,945 versus $29,951 for females. The per capita income for the county was $22,175. About 9.7% of families and 13.5% of the population were below the poverty line, including 19.2% of those under age 18 and 7.9% of those age 65 or over.

== Communities ==
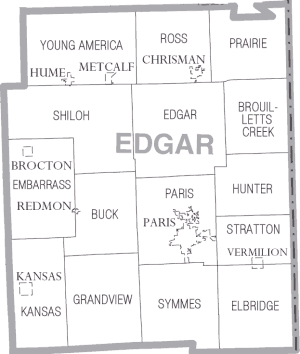
Map of Edgar County

=== Cities ===
- Chrisman
- Paris (seat)

=== Villages ===
- Brocton
- Hume
- Kansas
- Metcalf
- Redmon
- Vermilion

=== Unincorporated communities ===
- Borton
- Edgar
- Isabel
- Logan
- Nevins
- Oliver
- Raven
- Scottland

=== Former communities ===
- Bell Ridge
- Bloomfield
- Catfish
- Cherry Point
- Clays Prairie
- Conlogue
- Dudley
- Ferrel
- Garland
- Grandview
- Harris
- Hildreth
- Horace
- Huffmanville
- Hughes
- Illiana
- Kentucky
- Kidley
- Logan
- Mabel
- Marley
- Mays
- McCown
- Melwood
- Mortimer
- New Athens
- Palermo
- Quaker
- Scotts
- Warrington
- West Sandford
- Wetzel

=== Townships ===
- Brouilletts Creek
- Buck
- Edgar
- Elbridge
- Embarrass
- Grandview
- Hunter
- Kansas
- Paris
- Prairie
- Ross
- Shiloh
- Stratton
- Symmes
- Young America

== Notable people ==
- Basil Bennett, Bronze Medalist in the Hammer Throw at the 1920 Olympics
- Carlos C. Ogden, Medal of Honor Recipient in World War II.
- Edward Adelbert Doisy, biochemist and Nobel Prize winner
- Frank Fletcher (baseball), professional baseball player with the Philadelphia Phillies
- Anastasie Brown, Superior General of the Sisters of Providence of Saint Mary-of-the-Woods and President of Saint Mary-of-the-Woods College
- Blanche B. Boyer, American classical philologist.

== Politics ==
A swing county in the first eight decades after the Civil War, Edgar County has since become powerfully Republican. It has been carried by only two Democrats since 1940 – Lyndon Johnson in 1964 by just 139 votes, and Bill Clinton in 1992 by a 41.1 percent plurality. Hillary Clinton’s 22.7 percent vote share in 2016 was by 9.3 percent the worst ever by a Democrat in the county.

United States presidential election results for Edgar County, Illinois
Year	Republican		Democratic		Third party(ies)	
Year	No.	%	No.	%	No.	%
1892	3,197	47.64%	3,164	47.15%	350	5.22%
1896	3,822	49.80%	3,729	48.59%	123	1.60%
1900	3,766	48.90%	3,783	49.12%	153	1.99%
1904	3,753	50.33%	3,443	46.17%	261	3.50%
1908	3,757	50.46%	3,433	46.11%	255	3.43%
1912	2,430	32.84%	3,479	47.02%	1,490	20.14%
1916	6,099	46.37%	6,710	51.01%	345	2.62%
1920	6,750	53.29%	5,694	44.95%	223	1.76%
1924	6,297	52.31%	5,222	43.38%	518	4.30%
1928	7,509	58.27%	5,325	41.32%	52	0.40%
1932	5,953	43.03%	7,745	55.98%	138	1.00%
1936	6,929	46.51%	7,822	52.50%	147	0.99%
1940	7,985	54.03%	6,713	45.42%	82	0.55%
1944	6,961	57.68%	5,054	41.88%	54	0.45%
1948	6,282	54.77%	5,121	44.65%	67	0.58%
1952	8,323	64.56%	4,558	35.36%	10	0.08%
1956	7,942	64.52%	4,362	35.44%	5	0.04%
1960	7,348	59.37%	5,024	40.59%	4	0.03%
1964	5,827	49.41%	5,966	50.59%	0	0.00%
1968	6,281	56.33%	3,565	31.97%	1,305	11.70%
1972	7,195	64.73%	3,889	34.99%	32	0.29%
1976	5,842	53.01%	5,058	45.89%	121	1.10%
1980	6,639	63.14%	3,394	32.28%	482	4.58%
1984	6,821	67.54%	3,241	32.09%	37	0.37%
1988	5,538	58.55%	3,880	41.02%	41	0.43%
1992	3,790	38.77%	4,014	41.06%	1,972	20.17%
1996	3,746	45.12%	3,552	42.78%	1,004	12.09%
2000	4,833	58.71%	3,216	39.07%	183	2.22%
2004	5,258	62.38%	3,093	36.69%	78	0.93%
2008	4,398	53.09%	3,743	45.18%	143	1.73%
2012	5,132	65.50%	2,565	32.74%	138	1.76%
2016	5,645	71.46%	1,793	22.70%	461	5.84%
2020	6,193	75.41%	1,887	22.98%	132	1.61%
2024	5,955	75.11%	1,816	22.91%	157	1.98%

== See also ==
- National Register of Historic Places listings in Edgar County, Illinois
