= Symmes Township =

Symmes Township may refer to:

- Symmes Township, Edgar County, Illinois
- Symmes Township, Hamilton County, Ohio
- Symmes Township, Lawrence County, Ohio
