= Scottland, Illinois =

Scottland
- Census-designated place
- Edgar County's location in Illinois

- Scottland's location in Edgar County
- Coordinates: 39°48′16″N 87°36′18″W
- Country: United States
- State: Illinois
- County: Edgar County
- Township: Prairie Township
- Elevation: 630 ft (190 m)
- Time zone: UTC-6 (CST)
  - Summer (DST): UTC-5 (CDT)
- ZIP code: 61924
- Area code: 217
- GNIS feature ID: 0418150

Scottland is an unincorporated community in Prairie Township, Edgar County, Illinois, United States.

== Education ==
Scottland had its own high school during the mid-20th century. In 1937, Scottland High School graduated its first four-year class. The high school remained open until 1972, when the Scottland schools merged with the schools in nearby Chrisman. The high school mascot was the "Eagles".

== Info ==
The population is approximately 80–100. Scottland is adjacent to U.S. 36.
