= Ross Township, Edgar County, Illinois =

Ross Township
- Township
- Location in Edgar County

- Edgar County's location in Illinois
- Coordinates: 39°50′25″N 87°43′00″W
- Country: United States
- State: Illinois
- County: Edgar
- Established: November 4, 1856

Area
  - Total: 36.63 sq mi (94.9 km^{2})
  - Land: 36.63 sq mi (94.9 km^{2})
  - Water: 0 sq mi (0 km^{2}) 0%
- Elevation: 666 ft (203 m)

Population (2020)
  - Total: 1,509
  - Density: 41.20/sq mi (15.91/km^{2})
- Time zone: UTC-6 (CST)
  - Summer (DST): UTC-5 (CDT)
- ZIP codes: 61870, 61924
- FIPS code: 17-045-65923

Ross Township is one of fifteen townships in Edgar County, Illinois, USA. As of the 2020 census, its population was 1,509 and it contained 653 housing units.

== Geography ==
According to the 2021 census gazetteer files, Ross Township has a total area of 36.63 square miles (94.87 km^{2}), all land.

=== Cities, towns, villages ===
- Chrisman

=== Extinct towns ===
- Cherry Point
- Mabel
- Mortimer
- Scotts

=== Cemeteries ===
- Bacon (small)
- Gaines
- Ross
- Woodland

=== Major highways ===
- US Route 36
- US Route 150
- Illinois Route 1

== Demographics ==
As of the 2020 census there were 1,509 people, 697 households, and 462 families residing in the township. The population density was 41.20 inhabitants per square mile (15.91/km^{2}). There were 653 housing units at an average density of 17.83 per square mile (6.88/km^{2}). The racial makeup of the township was 93.70% White, 0.53% African American, 0.13% Native American, 0.40% Asian, 0.00% Pacific Islander, 1.06% from other races, and 4.17% from two or more races. Hispanic or Latino of any race were 1.39% of the population.

There were 697 households, out of which 30.10% had children under the age of 18 living with them, 61.98% were married couples living together, 3.30% had a female householder with no spouse present, and 33.72% were non-families. 28.70% of all households were made up of individuals, and 15.20% had someone living alone who was 65 years of age or older. The average household size was 2.39 and the average family size was 3.02.

The township's age distribution consisted of 24.8% under the age of 18, 5.0% from 18 to 24, 23.8% from 25 to 44, 24.5% from 45 to 64, and 21.8% who were 65 years of age or older. The median age was 38.7 years. For every 100 females, there were 90.3 males. For every 100 females age 18 and over, there were 81.8 males.

The median income for a household in the township was $56,635, and the median income for a family was $75,313. Males had a median income of $42,969 versus $30,962 for females. The per capita income for the township was $27,627. About 5.8% of families and 8.5% of the population were below the poverty line, including 5.9% of those under age 18 and 11.1% of those age 65 or over.

Historical population
Census	Pop.	Note	%±
2010	1,594		—
2020	1,509		−5.3%
US Decennial Census

== School districts ==
- Edgar County Community Unit District 6

== Political districts ==
- Illinois's 15th congressional district
- State House District 109
- State Senate District 55
