= Grandview Township, Edgar County, Illinois =

Grandview Township
- Township
- Location in Edgar County

- Edgar County's location in Illinois
- Coordinates: 39°32′00″N 87°50′00″W
- Country: United States
- State: Illinois
- County: Edgar
- Established: November 4, 1856

Area
  - Total: 45.13 sq mi (116.9 km^{2})
  - Land: 45.07 sq mi (116.7 km^{2})
  - Water: 0.06 sq mi (0.16 km^{2}) 0.13%
- Elevation: 738 ft (225 m)

Population (2020)
  - Total: 523
  - Density: 11.6/sq mi (4.48/km^{2})
- Time zone: UTC-6 (CST)
  - Summer (DST): UTC-5 (CDT)
- ZIP codes: 61933, 61944
- FIPS code: 17-045-30822

Grandview Township is one of fifteen townships in Edgar County, Illinois, USA. As of the 2020 census, its population was 523 and it contained 238 housing units.

== Geography ==
According to the 2021 census gazetteer files, Grandview Township has a total area of 45.13 square miles (116.89 km^{2}), of which 45.07 square miles (116.73 km^{2}) (or 99.87%) is land and 0.06 square miles (0.16 km^{2}) (or 0.13%) is water.

=== Unincorporated towns ===
- Conlogue
- Dudley
- Grandview

=== Cemeteries ===
The township contains these twelve cemeteries: Augustus, Barr-Johnson, Beatty, Boyer, Cholera, Gill, Grandview, Hinds, Huffman, New Goshen, Rudy and Tate. There is also Baber Family Cemetery, Goshen, Ryan.

=== Major highways ===
- Illinois Route 16

=== Airports and landing strips ===
- Bussart Airport
- Glatthaar Airport
- Gough Airport

== Demographics ==
As of the 2020 census there were 523 people, 215 households, and 146 families residing in the township. The population density was 11.59 inhabitants per square mile (4.47/km^{2}). There were 238 housing units at an average density of 5.27 per square mile (2.03/km^{2}). The racial makeup of the township was 93.12% White, 0.38% African American, 0.00% Native American, 0.00% Asian, 0.00% Pacific Islander, 0.00% from other races, and 6.50% from two or more races. Hispanic or Latino of any race were 0.76% of the population.

There were 215 households, out of which 32.60% had children under the age of 18 living with them, 61.40% were married couples living together, 5.12% had a female householder with no spouse present, and 32.09% were non-families. 28.80% of all households were made up of individuals, and 18.60% had someone living alone who was 65 years of age or older. The average household size was 2.47 and the average family size was 3.10.

The township's age distribution consisted of 19.7% under the age of 18, 3.2% from 18 to 24, 38% from 25 to 44, 17.5% from 45 to 64, and 21.6% who were 65 years of age or older. The median age was 34.5 years. For every 100 females, there were 111.1 males. For every 100 females age 18 and over, there were 98.6 males.

The median income for a household in the township was $67,875, and the median income for a family was $75,500. Males had a median income of $42,963 versus $35,625 for females. The per capita income for the township was $27,213. About 4.1% of families and 5.3% of the population were below the poverty line, including 0.0% of those under age 18 and 10.4% of those age 65 or over.

Historical population
Census	Pop.	Note	%±
2010	590		—
2020	523		−11.4%
U.S. Decennial Census

== School districts ==
- Kansas Community Unit School District 3
- Paris Community Unit School District No. 4

== Political districts ==
- Illinois' 15th congressional district
- State House District 110
- State Senate District 55
