= Nevins, Illinois =

Nevins
- Unincorporated community
- Edgar County's location in Illinois

- Nevins's location in Edgar County
- Coordinates: 39°32′02″N 87°38′19″W
- Country: United States
- State: Illinois
- County: Edgar
- Township: Elbridge
- Elevation: 679 ft (207 m)
- Area code: 217
- GNIS feature ID: 414377

Nevins is an unincorporated community in Edgar County, Illinois, United States.
