= Logan, Edgar County, Illinois =

Logan
- Unincorporated community
- Edgar County's location in Illinois

- Logan's location in Edgar County
- Coordinates: 39°44′14″N 87°36′18″W
- Country: United States
- State: Illinois
- County: Edgar County
- Township: Brouilletts Creek Township
- Elevation: 640 ft (195 m)
- ZIP code: 61924
- Area code: 217
- GNIS feature ID: 0412508

Logan is an unincorporated community in Brouilletts Creek Township, Edgar County, Illinois, United States. Logan is 6 miles (9.7 km) southeast of Chrisman.
