= Buck Township =

Buck Township may refer to the following townships in the United States:

- Buck Township, Edgar County, Illinois
- Buck Township, Hardin County, Ohio
- Buck Township, Luzerne County, Pennsylvania

== See also ==
- Bucks Township, Ohio
