= Hunter Township =

Hunter Township may refer to the following townships in the United States:

- Hunter Township, Edgar County, Illinois
- Hunter Township, Jackson County, Minnesota
