= Logan, Illinois =

Logan, Illinois may refer to:

- An alternate name for the village of Hanaford, Illinois
- Logan, Edgar County, Illinois, an unincorporated community in Edgar County
