= Buck Township, Edgar County, Illinois =

Buck Township
- Township
- Location in Edgar County

- Edgar County's location in Illinois
- Coordinates: 39°38′29″N 87°49′36″W
- Country: United States
- State: Illinois
- County: Edgar
- Established: November 4, 1856

Area
  - Total: 34.27 sq mi (88.8 km^{2})
  - Land: 34.27 sq mi (88.8 km^{2})
  - Water: 0 sq mi (0 km^{2}) 0%
- Elevation: 676 ft (206 m)
- Time zone: UTC-6 (CST)
  - Summer (DST): UTC-5 (CDT)
- ZIP codes: 61917, 61933, 61944, 61949
- FIPS code: 17-045-09213

Buck Township is one of fifteen townships in Edgar County, Illinois, USA. As of the 2020 census, its population was 214 and it contained 124 housing units. Buck Township was originally called Pilot Grove Township, but its name was changed on May 9, 1857.

== Geography ==
According to the 2021 census gazetteer files, Buck Township has a total area of 34.27 square miles (88.76 km^{2}), all land.

=== Cities, towns, villages ===
- Redmon

=== Extinct towns ===
- Mays

=== Major highways ===
- Illinois Route 133

== Demographics ==
As of the 2020 census there were 214 people, 127 households, and 86 families residing in the township. The population density was 6.24 inhabitants per square mile (2.41/km^{2}). There were 124 housing units at an average density of 3.62 per square mile (1.40/km^{2}). The racial makeup of the township was 98.13% White, 0.00% African American, 0.00% Native American, 0.00% Asian, 0.00% Pacific Islander, 0.00% from other races, and 1.87% from two or more races. Hispanic or Latino of any race were 0.47% of the population.

There were 127 households, out of which 21.30% had children under the age of 18 living with them, 37.01% were married couples living together, 30.71% had a female householder with no spouse present, and 32.28% were non-families. 21.30% of all households were made up of individuals, and 7.10% had someone living alone who was 65 years of age or older. The average household size was 2.45 and the average family size was 2.90.

The township's age distribution consisted of 16.7% under the age of 18, 18.6% from 18 to 24, 16.1% from 25 to 44, 31.8% from 45 to 64, and 16.7% who were 65 years of age or older. The median age was 42.2 years. For every 100 females, there were 85.1 males. For every 100 females age 18 and over, there were 77.4 males.

The median income for a household in the township was $55,938, and the median income for a family was $73,667. Males had a median income of $42,917 versus $31,250 for females. The per capita income for the township was $29,175. About 1.2% of families and 6.8% of the population were below the poverty line, including none of those under age 18 and 5.8% of those age 65 or over.

Historical population
Census	Pop.	Note	%±
1930	683		—
1940	623		−8.8%
1950	594		−4.7%
1960	512		−13.8%
1970	394		−23.0%
1980	293		−25.6%
1990	366		24.9%
2000	309		−15.6%
2010	307		−0.6%
2020	214		−30.3%
U.S. Decennial Census

== School districts ==
- Kansas Community Unit School District 3
- Paris Community Unit School District No. 4
- Shiloh Community Unit School District 1

== Political districts ==
- Illinois's 15th congressional district
- State House District 109
- State Senate District 55
