= Stratton Township, Edgar County, Illinois =

Stratton Township
- Township
- Location in Edgar County

- Edgar County's location in Illinois
- Coordinates: 39°36′25″N 87°35′28″W
- Country: United States
- State: Illinois
- County: Edgar
- Established: November 4, 1856

Area
  - Total: 24.8 sq mi (64 km^{2})
  - Land: 24.8 sq mi (64 km^{2})
  - Water: 0 sq mi (0 km^{2}) 0%
- Elevation: 666 ft (203 m)

Population (2020)
  - Total: 461
  - Density: 18.6/sq mi (7.18/km^{2})
- Time zone: UTC-6 (CST)
  - Summer (DST): UTC-5 (CDT)
- ZIP code: 61944
- FIPS code: 17-045-73092

Stratton Township is one of fifteen townships in Edgar County, Illinois, USA. As of the 2020 census, its population was 461 and it contained 212 housing units. The name of the township was Wayne Township until May 9, 1857.

== Geography ==
According to the 2021 census gazetteer files, Stratton Township has a total area of 24.80 square miles (64.23 km^{2}), all land.

=== Cities, towns, villages ===
- Vermilion (north three-quarters)

=== Extinct towns ===
- Kentucky

=== Cemeteries ===
The township contains these three cemeteries: Blackburn, Little Grove and Pryor. There have been records found for Oak Grove, Whalen, and Wilkins.

=== Major highways ===
- US Route 150

== Demographics ==
As of the 2020 census there were 461 people, 242 households, and 194 families residing in the township. The population density was 18.59 inhabitants per square mile (7.18/km^{2}). There were 212 housing units at an average density of 8.55 per square mile (3.30/km^{2}). The racial makeup of the township was 97.18% White, 0.00% African American, 0.22% Native American, 0.00% Asian, 0.00% Pacific Islander, 0.22% from other races, and 2.39% from two or more races. Hispanic or Latino of any race were 0.65% of the population.

There were 242 households, out of which 32.60% had children under the age of 18 living with them, 66.94% were married couples living together, 7.85% had a female householder with no spouse present, and 19.83% were non-families. 18.60% of all households were made up of individuals, and 8.30% had someone living alone who was 65 years of age or older. The average household size was 2.68 and the average family size was 2.89.

The township's age distribution consisted of 28.2% under the age of 18, 1.1% from 18 to 24, 19.3% from 25 to 44, 27.8% from 45 to 64, and 23.6% who were 65 years of age or older. The median age was 46.7 years. For every 100 females, there were 138.2 males. For every 100 females age 18 and over, there were 114.3 males.

The median income for a household in the township was $73,750, and the median income for a family was $80,093. Males had a median income of $41,719 versus $6,979 for females. The per capita income for the township was $27,284. About 2.6% of families and 5.1% of the population were below the poverty line, including 2.2% of those under age 18 and 0.0% of those age 65 or over.

Historical population
Census	Pop.	Note	%±
2010	481		—
2020	461		−4.2%
U.S. Decennial Census

== School districts ==
- Paris Community Unit School District No. 4

== Political districts ==
- Illinois' 15th congressional district
- State House District 109
- State Senate District 55
