= Elbridge Township, Edgar County, Illinois =

Elbridge Township
- Township
- Location in Edgar County

- Edgar County's location in Illinois
- Coordinates: 39°31′51″N 87°35′16″W
- Country: United States
- State: Illinois
- County: Edgar
- Established: November 4, 1856

Area
  - Total: 43.52 sq mi (112.7 km^{2})
  - Land: 43.46 sq mi (112.6 km^{2})
  - Water: 0.05 sq mi (0.13 km^{2}) 0.12%
- Elevation: 564 ft (172 m)

Population (2020)
  - Total: 707
  - Density: 16.3/sq mi (6.28/km^{2})
- Time zone: UTC-6 (CST)
  - Summer (DST): UTC-5 (CDT)
- ZIP codes: 61944, 62423
- FIPS code: 17-045-22912

Historical population
Census	Pop.	Note	%±
1930	1,141		—
1940	1,118		−2.0%
1950	907		−18.9%
1960	792		−12.7%
1970	689		−13.0%
1980	733		6.4%
1990	672		−8.3%
2000	1,009		50.1%
2010	830		−17.7%
2020	707		−14.8%
U.S. Decennial Census

Elbridge Township is one of fifteen townships in Edgar County, Illinois, USA. At the 2020 census, its population was 707 and it contained 316 housing units.

== Geography ==
According to the 2021 census gazetteer files, Elbridge Township has a total area of 43.52 square miles (112.72 km^{2}), of which 43.46 square miles (112.56 km^{2}) (or 99.88%) is land and 0.05 square miles (0.13 km^{2}) (or 0.12%) is water.

=== Cities, towns, villages ===
- Vermilion (south quarter)

=== Extinct towns ===
- Elbridge
- Ferrel
- Marley
- Nevins
- West Sandford

=== Cemeteries ===
The township contains these eight cemeteries: Cummings, Gymon, New Providence, Old Baptist, Simms, Vermilion, Wilkins and Wilson.

== Demographics ==
As of the 2020 census there were 707 people, 302 households, and 184 families residing in the township. The population density was 16.25 inhabitants per square mile (6.27/km^{2}). There were 316 housing units at an average density of 7.26 per square mile (2.80/km^{2}). The racial makeup of the township was 96.04% White, 0.71% African American, 0.14% Native American, 0.00% Asian, 0.00% Pacific Islander, 0.71% from other races, and 2.40% from two or more races. Hispanic or Latino of any race were 0.57% of the population.

There were 302 households, out of which 17.50% had children under the age of 18 living with them, 57.28% were married couples living together, none had a female householder with no spouse present, and 39.07% were non-families. 39.10% of all households were made up of individuals, and 27.20% had someone living alone who was 65 years of age or older. The average household size was 1.94 and the average family size was 2.54.

The township's age distribution consisted of 14.8% under the age of 18, 2.2% from 18 to 24, 13.4% from 25 to 44, 29.9% from 45 to 64, and 39.8% who were 65 years of age or older. The median age was 60.1 years. For every 100 females, there were 84.3 males. For every 100 females age 18 and over, there were 89.0 males.

The median income for a household in the township was $72,900, and the median income for a family was $79,375. Males had a median income of $77,586 versus $14,286 for females. The per capita income for the township was $39,022. No families and 11.3% of the population were below the poverty line, including none of those under age 18 and 28.3% of those age 65 or over.

== School districts ==
- Paris Community Unit School District No. 4

== Political districts ==
- Illinois's 15th congressional district
- State House District 109
- State Senate District 55
