= Abraham L. Stanfield =

American businessman and politician (1860–1927)

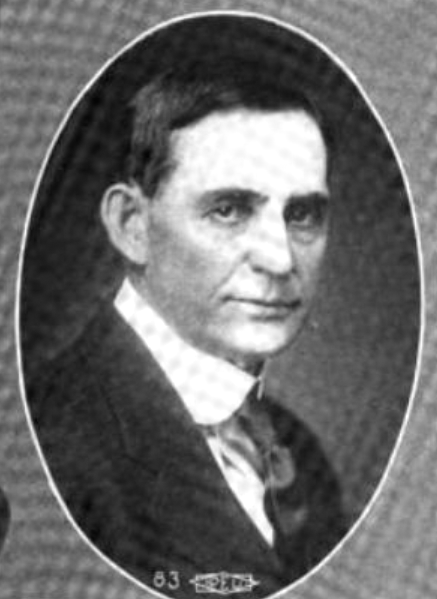

Member of the Illinois House of Representatives
- In office 1910 – August 5, 1927

Personal details
- Born: Abraham Lincoln Stanfield; September 4, 1860 Edgar, Illinois, US
- Died: August 5, 1927 (aged 66) Paris, Illinois, US
- Party: Republican
- Occupation: Businessman, politician

Abraham Lincoln Stanfield (September 4, 1860 – August 5, 1927) was an American businessman and politician.

== Biography ==
Stanfield was born on a farm near Edgar, Illinois. He went to the public schools and to business college. Stanfield lived in Paris, Illinois and was a grain dealer. Stansfield served in the Illinois House of Representatives from 1911 until his death in 1927. He was a Republican. Stanfield died from cancer at his home in Paris, Illinois.
