= Pony Express Bridge =

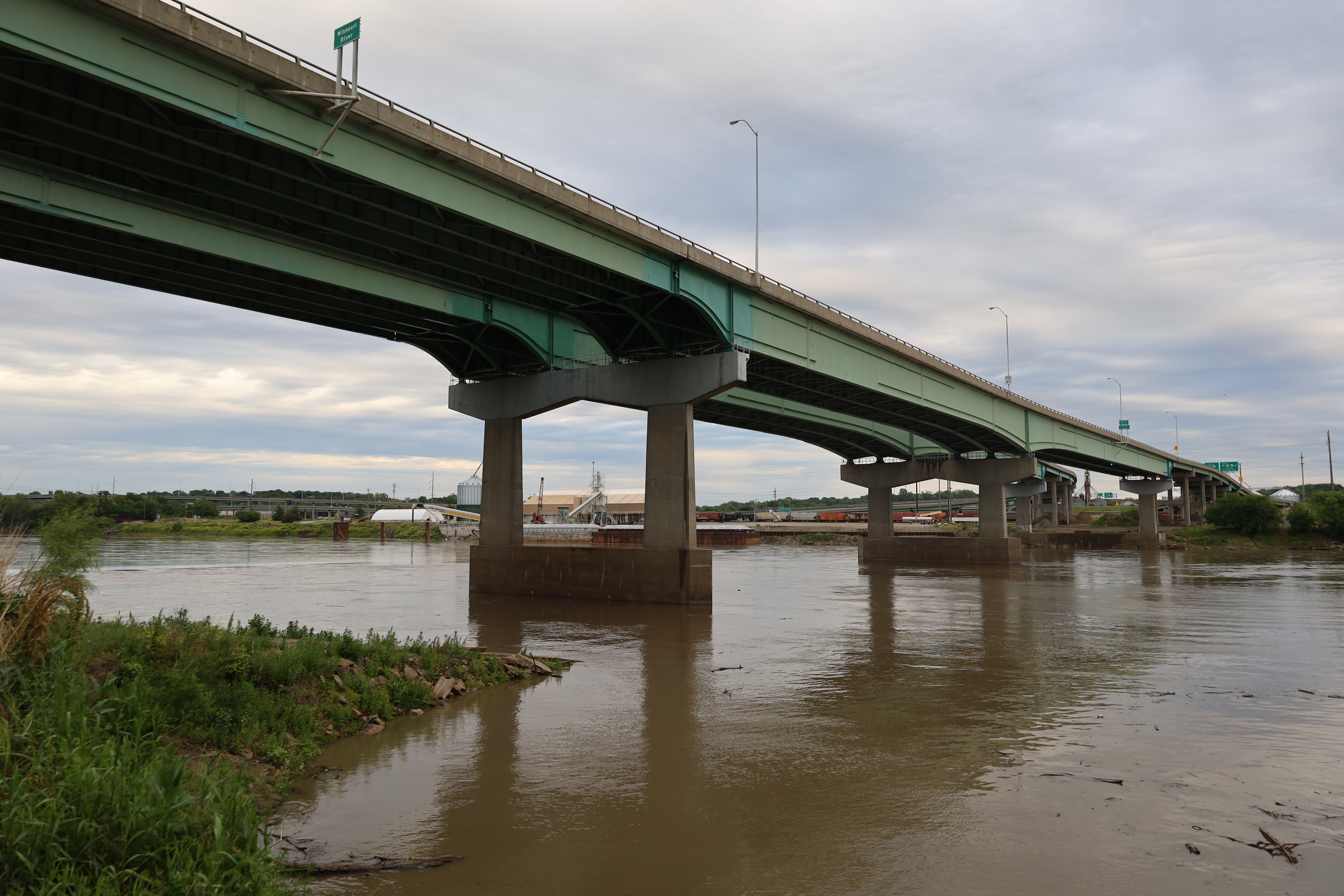
- The bridge in 2025
- Coordinates: 39.7488°N 94.8597°W
- Carries: US 36
- Crosses: Missouri River
- Locale: Elwood, Kansas and St. Joseph, Missouri
- Official name: Pony Express Bridges
- Maintained by: Missouri Department of Transportation

Characteristics
- Design: Twin Girder bridge

History
- Opened: 1983

Location
- Interactive map of Pony Express Bridge

The Pony Express Bridge is a highway girder bridge over the Missouri River connecting Elwood, Kansas with St. Joseph, Missouri on U.S. Route 36 (US 36). The bridge is referred to in signage as "Pony Express Bridges" because there are separate bridges for east- and westbound traffic.

It was built in 1983 at a cost of $33 million to replace an older bridge built in 1929 and demolished in 1984. The older bridge was also known as the "Pony Express Bridge", although it also bore the name "Free Bridge". A construction supervisor and a government highway inspector were both killed in separate accidents during the construction of the 1983 bridge.

The bridge is near the historic Pony Express stables at the latter's eastern terminus in St. Joseph. US 36 to Marysville, Kansas is designated the Pony Express Memorial Highway because it follows the route. The western footings of the bridge are on the historic family property of Johnny Fry, the "official" first west-bound rider of the Pony Express.

== See also ==
- List of crossings of the Missouri River

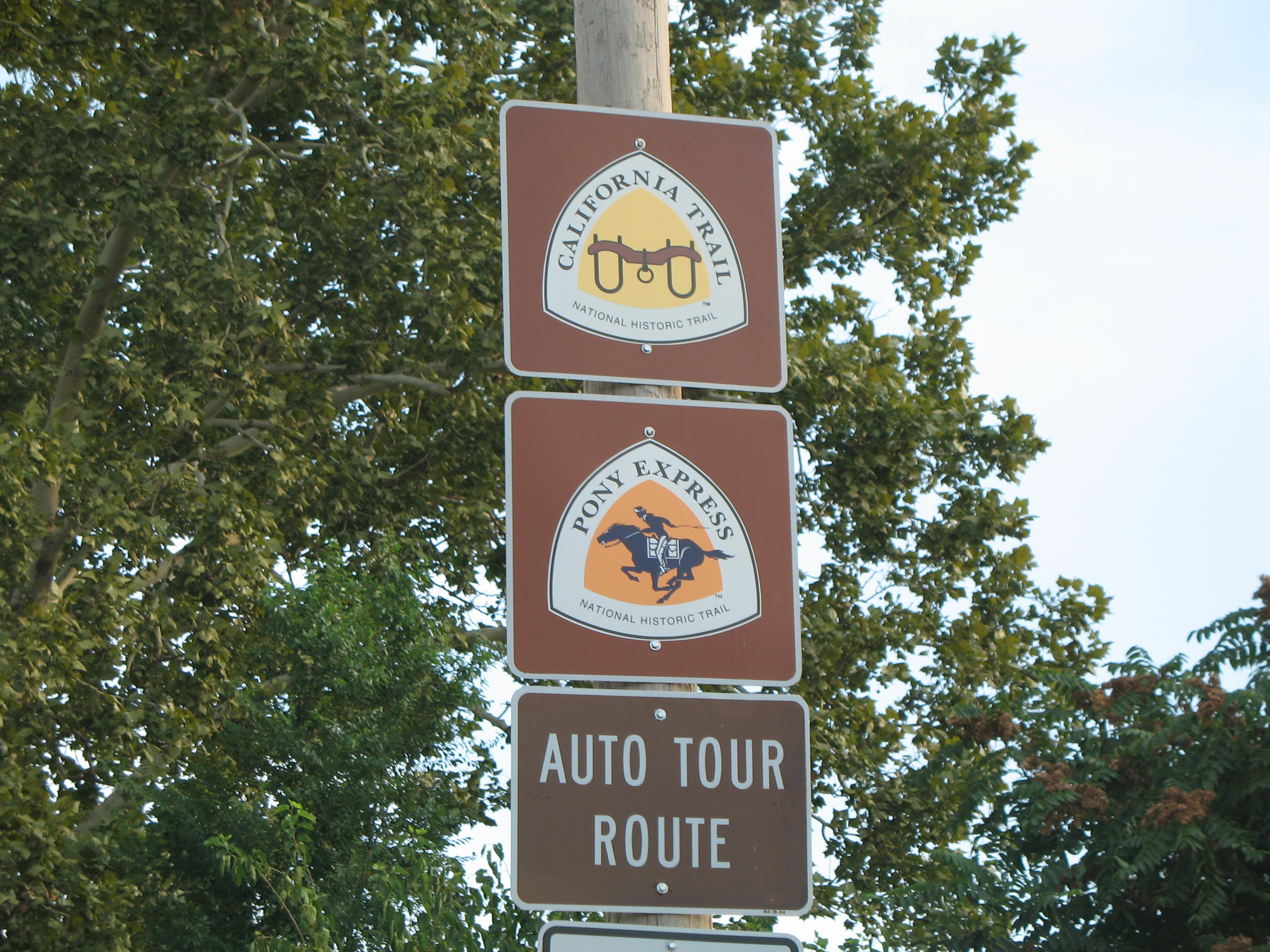
California Trail and Pony Express Trail designations at entrance to Pony Express Bridge
