= John Edgar (politician) =

American politician

John Edgar (c. 1750–1832) was an Illinois pioneer and politician. He was born in Ireland. In 1776, he was the commander of a British ship in the Great Lakes. He resigned from the British Navy rather than fight against the Americans.

Edgar settled at Fort Kaskaskia in 1784. He became a merchant, and built a flour mill. He shipped large quantities of flour from Illinois to New Orleans.

Edgar was an Illinois delegate to the Legislature of the Northwest Territory. He also served as Justice of the Peace and Judge in Kaskaskia.

In his time, Edgar was believed to have been the wealthiest man in Illinois. He held many large land claims around the state. Edgar County, Illinois was named in his honor. Although he probably never went there, there is an old story that he once bought and then sold the entire county.

== Sources ==
- History of McKendree College, Walton, 1928

Assembly seats
New district	Member of the Northwest Territory House of Representatives from Randolph County; 1799–1801	Succeeded by None
