= Vermilion, Illinois =

Vermilion
- Village
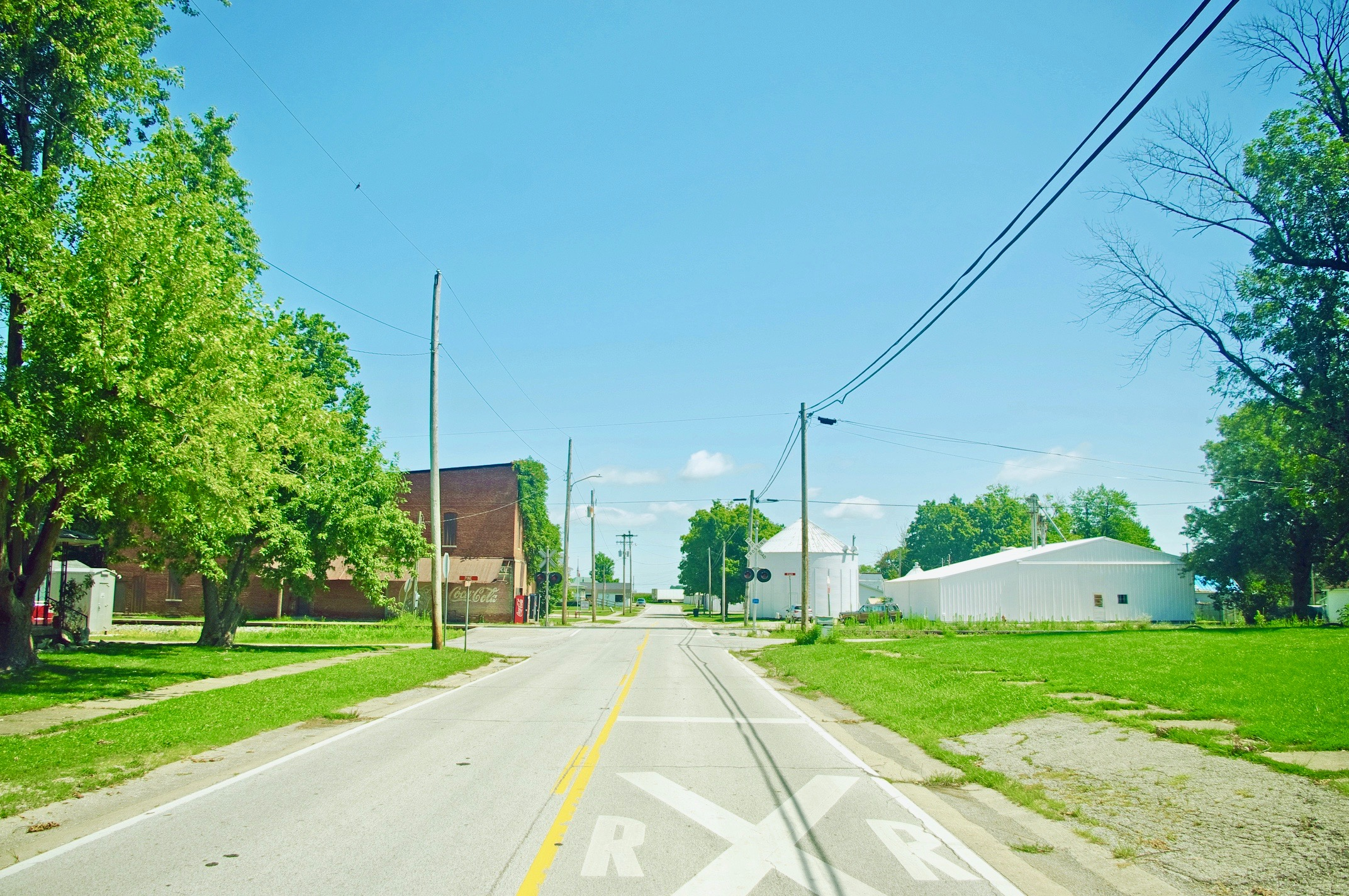
- Church Street

- Location of Vermilion in Edgar County, Illinois.

- Vermilion's location in Edgar County
- Coordinates: 39°34′49″N 87°35′17″W
- Country: United States
- State: Illinois
- County: Edgar
- Township: Elbridge, Stratton

Area
  - Total: 0.54 sq mi (1.41 km^{2})
  - Land: 0.54 sq mi (1.41 km^{2})
  - Water: 0 sq mi (0.00 km^{2})
- Elevation: 673 ft (205 m)

Population (2020)
  - Total: 203
  - Density: 372/sq mi (143.5/km^{2})
- Time zone: UTC-6 (CST)
  - Summer (DST): UTC-5 (CDT)
- ZIP code: 61955
- Area code: 217
- FIPS code: 17–77551
- GNIS feature ID: 2400058

Vermilion is a village in Stratton and Elbridge Township townships, Edgar County, Illinois, United States. The population was 203 at the 2020 census.

== History ==
Vermilion was established in the mid-1850s and named for its first postmaster. The spelling was originally "Vermillion" (with two L's), but was changed to the current spelling (with one L) in 1949. Vermilion incorporated in 1873.

== Geography ==
Vermilion is located about three miles west of the border with Indiana, and just south of U.S. Route 150. A CSX railroad passes from northwest to southeast through the middle of the town on its route between Paris and Terre Haute, Indiana.

According to the 2021 census gazetteer files, Vermilion has a total area of 0.55 square miles (1.42 km^{2}), all land.

== Demographics ==
Historical population
Census	Pop.	Note	%±
1880	387		—
1890	325		−16.0%
1900	305		−6.2%
1910	287		−5.9%
1920	318		10.8%
1930	279		−12.3%
1940	312		11.8%
1950	316		1.3%
1960	317		0.3%
1970	333		5.0%
1980	299		−10.2%
1990	283		−5.4%
2000	239		−15.5%
2010	225		−5.9%
2020	203		−9.8%
U.S. Decennial Census

As of the 2020 census there were 203 people, 93 households, and 66 families residing in the village. The population density was 371.79 inhabitants per square mile (143.55/km^{2}). There were 96 housing units at an average density of 175.82 units per square mile (67.88 units/km^{2}). The racial makeup of the village was 96.55% White, and 2.96% from two or more races. Hispanic or Latino of any race were 0.49% of the population.

There were 93 households, out of which 46.2% had children under the age of 18 living with them, 43.01% were married couples living together, 20.43% had a female householder with no husband present, and 29.03% were non-families. 25.81% of all households were made up of individuals, and 10.75% had someone living alone who was 65 years of age or older. The average household size was 3.38 and the average family size was 3.11.

The village's age distribution consisted of 37.0% under the age of 18, 2.4% from 18 to 24, 16.2% from 25 to 44, 32.2% from 45 to 64, and 12.1% who were 65 years of age or older. The median age was 38.0 years. For every 100 females, there were 151.3 males. For every 100 females age 18 and over, there were 130.4 males.

The median income for a household in the village was $60,156, and the median income for a family was $56,667. Males had a median income of $41,406 versus $33,750 for females. The per capita income for the village was $20,877. About 7.6% of families and 11.4% of the population were below the poverty line, including 3.7% of those under age 18 and none of those age 65 or over.

== Education ==
Residents are in the Paris Community Unit School District No. 4 and assigned to its sole school, Crestwood School.
