= Redmon, Illinois =

Redmon
- Village
- Location of Redmon in Edgar County, Illinois.

- Redmon's location in Edgar County
- Coordinates: 39°38′41″N 87°51′41″W
- Country: United States
- State: Illinois
- County: Edgar
- Township: Buck

Area
  - Total: 0.14 sq mi (0.37 km^{2})
  - Land: 0.14 sq mi (0.37 km^{2})
  - Water: 0 sq mi (0.00 km^{2})
- Elevation: 679 ft (207 m)

Population (2020)
  - Total: 137
  - Density: 946.7/sq mi (365.54/km^{2})
- Time zone: UTC-6 (CST)
  - Summer (DST): UTC-5 (CDT)
- ZIP code: 61933
- Area code: 217
- FIPS code: 17–63069
- GNIS feature ID: 2399054

Redmon is a village in Buck Township, Edgar County, Illinois, United States. The population was 137 at the 2020 census.

== Geography ==
According to the 2010 census, Redmon has a total area of 0.15 square miles (0.39 km^{2}), all land.

== Demographics ==
Historical population
Census	Pop.	Note	%±
1880	71		—
1890	99		39.4%
1900	282		184.8%
1910	240		−14.9%
1920	234		−2.5%
1930	227		−3.0%
1940	226		−0.4%
1950	226		0.0%
1960	175		−22.6%
1970	251		43.4%
1980	224		−10.8%
1990	201		−10.3%
2000	199		−1.0%
2010	173		−13.1%
2020	137		−20.8%
U.S. Decennial Census

As of the 2020 census there were 137 people, 85 households, and 48 families residing in the village. The population density was 944.83 inhabitants per square mile (364.80/km^{2}). There were 74 housing units at an average density of 510.34 units per square mile (197.04 units/km^{2}). The racial makeup of the village was 97.81% White and 2.19% from two or more races. Hispanic or Latino of any race were 0.73% of the population.

There were 85 households, out of which 12.9% had children under the age of 18 living with them, 28.24% were married couples living together, 28.24% had a female householder with no husband present, and 43.53% were non-families. 31.76% of all households were made up of individuals, and 10.59% had someone living alone who was 65 years of age or older. The average household size was 2.48 and the average family size was 1.94.

The village's age distribution consisted of 10.9% under the age of 18, 18.8% from 18 to 24, 16.4% from 25 to 44, 37.6% from 45 to 64, and 16.4% who were 65 years of age or older. The median age was 53.8 years. For every 100 females, there were 77.4 males. For every 100 females age 18 and over, there were 72.9 males.

The median income for a household in the village was $53,250, and the median income for a family was $73,667. Males had a median income of $50,750 versus $35,313 for females. The per capita income for the village was $31,661. About 2.1% of families and 7.9% of the population were below the poverty line, including none of those under age 18 and 11.1% of those age 65 or over.
