= Edgar, Illinois =

Edgar
- Unincorporated community
- Location within Edgar County, Illinois Location within Illinois Location within the United States
- Coordinates: 39°45′20″N 87°42′04″W
- Country: United States
- State: Illinois
- County: Edgar
- Elevation: 650 ft (200 m)
- Area code: 217
- GNIS feature ID: 407771

Edgar is an unincorporated community in Edgar County, Illinois, United States.

== History ==
Abraham L. Stanfield (1860–1927), Illinois state representative and businessman, was born on a farm near Edgar.
