= Brouilletts Creek Township, Edgar County, Illinois =

Brouilletts Creek Township
- Township
- Location in Edgar County

- Edgar County's location in Illinois
- Coordinates: 39°44′48″N 87°34′53″W
- Country: United States
- State: Illinois
- County: Edgar
- Established: November 4, 1856

Area
  - Total: 31.88 sq mi (82.6 km^{2})
  - Land: 31.88 sq mi (82.6 km^{2})
  - Water: 0 sq mi (0 km^{2}) 0%
- Elevation: 594 ft (181 m)

Population (2020)
  - Total: 191
  - Density: 5.99/sq mi (2.31/km^{2})
- Time zone: UTC-6 (CST)
  - Summer (DST): UTC-5 (CDT)
- ZIP codes: 61924, 61944
- FIPS code: 17-045-08901

Brouilletts Creek Township is one of fifteen townships in Edgar County, Illinois, USA. As of the 2020 census, its population was 191 and it contained 95 housing units.

== Geography ==
According to the 2021 census gazetteer files, Brouilletts Creek Township has a total area of 31.88 square miles (82.57 km^{2}), all land.

=== Extinct towns ===
- Kidley
- Logan

=== Cemeteries ===
The township contains these twelve cemeteries: Adams, Allen, Cameron, Houseton, Igo, Littlefield, McCauley, Mount Carmel, Newcomb, Newton, Old Scott and Sugar Grove.

== Demographics ==
As of the 2020 census there were 191 people, 75 households, and 62 families residing in the township. The population density was 5.99 inhabitants per square mile (2.31/km^{2}). There were 95 housing units at an average density of 2.98 units per square mile (1.15 units/km^{2}). The racial makeup of the township was 95.81% White, 1.57% African American, 0.00% Native American, 0.00% Asian, 0.00% Pacific Islander, 0.52% from other races, and 2.09% from two or more races. Hispanic or Latino of any race were 0.00% of the population.

There were 75 households, out of which 33.30% had children under the age of 18 living with them, 72.00% were married couples living together, 10.67% had a female householder with no spouse present, and 17.33% were non-families. No households were made up of individuals. The average household size was 2.37 and the average family size was 2.50.

The township's age distribution consisted of 21.3% under the age of 18, 9.0% from 18 to 24, 29.1% from 25 to 44, 29.2% from 45 to 64, and 11.2% who were 65 years of age or older. The median age was 43.6 years. For every 100 females, there were 178.1 males. For every 100 females age 18 and over, there were 118.8 males.

The median income for a household in the township was $68,906, and the median income for a family was $64,800. Males had a median income of $50,536 versus $33,750 for females. The per capita income for the township was $32,160. About 12.9% of families and 7.9% of the population were below the poverty line, including 15.8% of those under age 18 and none of those age 65 or over.

Historical population
Census	Pop.	Note	%±
1930	728		—
1940	636		−12.6%
1950	539		−15.3%
1960	424		−21.3%
1970	343		−19.1%
1980	307		−10.5%
1990	253		−17.6%
2000	240		−5.1%
2010	235		−2.1%
2020	191		−18.7%
U.S. Decennial Census

== School districts ==
- Edgar County Community Unit District 6
- Paris Community Unit School District No. 4

== Political districts ==
- Illinois' 15th congressional district
- State House District 109
- State Senate District 55
