= Oliver, Edgar County, Illinois =

Oliver
- Unincorporated community
- Location within Edgar County, Illinois Location within Illinois Location within the United States
- Coordinates: 39°29′02″N 87°40′53″W
- Country: United States
- State: Illinois
- County: Edgar
- Elevation: 630 ft (190 m)
- Area code: 217
- GNIS feature ID: 415097

Oliver is an unincorporated community in Edgar County, Illinois, United States.
