= Blanche B. Boyer =

American classical philologist

- Born: February 22, 1896; Brocton, Illinois, U.S.
- Died: January 12, 1984 (aged 87); Chicago, Illinois, U.S.
- Occupation: Classical philologist
- Awards: Guggenheim Fellow (1930)

Academic background
- Education: University of Chicago

Academic work
- Discipline: Classical philology
- Sub-discipline: History of insular script
- Institutions: Saint Xavier College; Allegheny College; Mount Holyoke College

Blanche Beatrice Boyer (February 22, 1896 – January 12, 1984) was an American classical philologist who was a leading authority in the history of insular script, a medieval script system of Irish origin.

== Biography ==
Blanche Beatrice Boyer, daughter of Edward Errett Boyer and Edna Narcissa Beck, was born on February 22, 1896, in Brocton, Illinois. She studied at the University of Chicago where she got her Bachelor of Arts in 1920, her Master of Arts in 1921, and her Doctor of Philosophy in 1925. Her dissertation was On the Lost Codex Veronensis of Catullus.

In the early-1920s, (Note: Sources differ on the exact date. The Database of Classical Scholars says 1921, but the John Simon Guggenheim Memorial Foundation says 1922) Boyer began working as an instructor in Greek and Latin at Saint Xavier College. In 1925, she later moved to Allegheny College, where she then became assistant professor of Latin. In 1927, she moved to Mount Holyoke College as assistant professor of Latin and was promoted to associate professor in 1929, remaining there until 1938. In 1938, she moved to University of Chicago and remained there until 1961, being promoted from Assistant Professor to Professor of Latin and serving as acting chair of the Department of Latin Language and Literature from 1947 to 1950.

As an academic, Boyer specialized in palaeography and Medieval Latin philology. She was also known as a leading authority in the history of insular script. John Francis Latimer said of A Critical Edition of Peter Abelard's 'Sic et Non', her 1976 joint publication with Richard McKeon: "[it] combined various opinions on doctrine, but made no attempt to reconcile the various views". She served as an associate editor for Classical Philology from 1940 until 1961.

Boyer was appointed as a Guggenheim Fellow in 1929 and 1930. She received an American Council of Learned Societies grant in 1933.

Boyer died on January 12, 1984, in Chicago, Illinois.
