= Edgar County Airport =

Airport in the Illinois, United States

- IATA: none; ICAO: KPRG; FAA LID: PRG

Summary
- Airport type: Public
- Owner: Sup. Board of Edgar Co.
- Serves: Paris, Illinois
- Time zone: UTC−06:00 (-6)
  - Summer (DST): UTC−05:00 (-5)
- Elevation AMSL: 654 ft (199 m)
- Coordinates: 39°42′01″N 87°40′11″W
- Website: Official website

Maps
- Location of Edgar County in Illinois

- Location of airport in Illinois PRG (the United States)

Runways
Direction	Length		Surface
Direction	ft	m	Surface
9/27	4,501	1,372	Asphalt
18/36	3,200	975	Asphalt

Statistics (2019)
- Aircraft Aperations: 6,900
- Based Aircraft: 13
- Source: Federal Aviation Administration

Edgar County Airport (ICAO: KPRG, FAA LID: PRG) is a public use airport in Edgar County, Illinois, United States. It is located five nautical miles (5.8 mi; 9.3 km) north of the central business district of Paris, Illinois. The airport is included in the FAA's National Plan of Integrated Airport Systems for 2017–2021, which categorized it as a general aviation facility.

Although many U.S. airports use the same three-letter location identifier for the FAA and IATA, this facility is assigned PRG by the FAA but has no designation from the IATA (which assigned PRG to Ruzyne International Airport in Prague, Czech Republic).

== Facilities and aircraft ==
Edgar County Airport covers an area of 180 acres (73 ha) at an elevation of 654 feet (199 m) above mean sea level. It has two asphalt runways: 9/27 has a surface measuring 4,501 by 75 feet (1,372 by 23 m). The second intersecting runway, designated 18/36, has a surface measuring 3,200 by 75 feet (975 by 23 m).

For the 12-month period ending August 31, 2019, the airport had 6,900 aircraft operations, an average of 19 per day: 99% general aviation and 1% air taxi. For the same time, there were 13 aircraft based at this airport: 11 single-engine airplanes, 1 multi-engine airplane, and 1 ultralight.

== Airport controversy ==
On August 27, 2013, pilot Rusty Bogue was involved in a fatal crash during takeoff from the Edgar County Airport. He was flying a Cessna 421, twin-engine six seat aircraft. The aircraft experienced apparent engine trouble and struck a tree a mile from the end of the runway.

Bogue had been the victim of several issues instigated by the Edgar County Board, the Edgar County Airport Board, and the Airport Manager. There are numerous allegations of fraud, illegal contracts, and other abuses of power, including accusations involving the propriety of a concrete contract to extend the runway. This contract was placed with the concrete company owned by a now-former chair of the airport advisory board.

On November 19, 2013, two aircraft, owned by the same owner as the Cessna 421 in which Bogue was killed, were damaged by incendiary devices placed on them. The planes had been spray painted with a threatening message to Bogue's father, Rob.

The FAA and IDOT's Division of Aeronautics has stopped an airport improvement grant for three consecutive years due to alleged fraud in grant applications submitted by the former airport manager, Jimmy Wells, and the Edgar County Board.

== Accidents and incidents ==
- On August 27, 2013, a Cessna 421C crashed just after takeoff. The aircraft had engine issues on takeoff and impacted a tree a mile after takeoff. Witnesses reported that the aircraft's takeoff run appeared slower than normal, and the aircraft was found to have used the entire runway and traveled through two different 300-foot fields.
- On November 19, 2013, two aircraft were destroyed by firebombs placed anonymously.

== See also ==
- List of airports in Illinois
