= Paris Union School District 95 =

School district in Edgar County, Illinois, United States

Address
- 509 East Newton Street Paris, Illinois, 61944; United States

District information
- Type: Public
- Grades: PreK–12
- NCES District ID: 1730750

Students and staff
- Students: 1,230

Other information
- Website: www.paris95.k12.il.us

Paris Union School District 95 is a school district headquartered in Paris, Illinois.

It serves much of the Paris city limits and some unincorporated areas just outside of Paris.

== Schools ==
- Memorial Elementary School
- Carolyn Wenz Elementary School
- Mayo Middle School
- Paris Cooperative High School (now a cooperative high school under its own board of education)
