= U.S. Route 36 =

Highway in the United States

U.S. Route 36
- US 36 highlighted in red

Route information
- Length: 1,414 mi (2,276 km)
- Existed: 1926–present

Major junctions
- West end: US 34 in Rocky Mountain National Park, CO
- I-25 in Welby, CO; I-70 in Denver, CO; I-29 in St. Joseph, MO; I-35 in Cameron, MO; I-72 from Hannibal, MO to Decatur, IL; I-55 in Springfield, IL; I-57 in Tuscola, IL; I-65 / I-69 / I-70 / I-74 in Indianapolis, IN; I-75 in Piqua, OH; I-77 near Newcomerstown, OH
- East end: US 250 / SR 800 in Uhrichsville, OH

Location
- Country: United States
- States: Colorado, Kansas, Missouri, Illinois, Indiana, Ohio

Highway system
- United States Numbered Highway System; List; Special; Divided
← US 35	→ US 40

U.S. Route 36 (US 36) is an east–west United States Numbered Highway that travels approximately 1,414 miles (2,276 km) from Rocky Mountain National Park, Colorado to Uhrichsville, Ohio. The highway's western terminus is at Deer Ridge Junction, an intersection in Rocky Mountain National Park, Colorado, where it meets US 34. Its eastern terminus is at US 250 in Uhrichsville, Ohio.

== Route description ==
=== Colorado ===
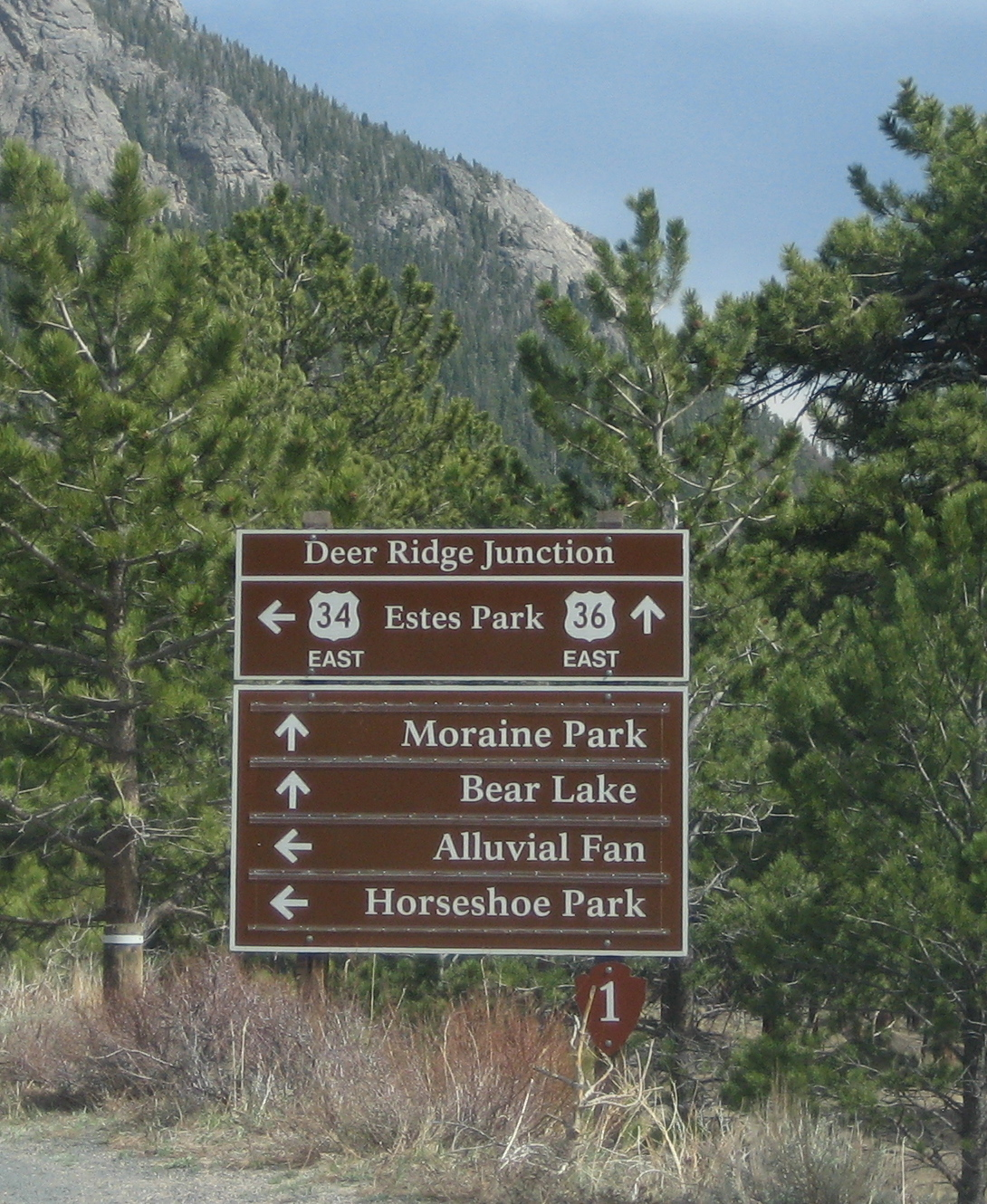
Sign on US 34 approaching the western endpoint of US 36 at Deer Ridge Junction in Rocky Mountain National Park.

US Route 36 begins at US 34 at Deer Ridge Junction in Rocky Mountain National Park in Colorado, just west of Estes Park. It then passes through Boulder and Denver on its way to Kansas. Between Boulder and Denver, the road that is now US 36 was originally built as the Denver-Boulder Turnpike. It serves today as a major arterial freeway in the Front Range Urban Corridor. Between Denver and Byers, US 36 exists in unsigned overlaps with I-270 and I-70, while some parts of its original route are signed separately as Colorado State Highway 36 (SH 36). After it diverges from I-70 in Byers, US 36 is a relatively lightly traveled two-lane rural highway to the Kansas state line.

=== Kansas ===
US-36 passes through all 13 counties in Kansas which border Nebraska. The highway enters the Sunflower State from Colorado in Cheyenne County, and leaves the state by crossing the Missouri River on the Pony Express Bridges entering Missouri.

The section of US-36 from Washington, Kansas to St. Joseph, Missouri is officially called the Pony Express Highway because it marks the starting section of the Pony Express. It crosses the Missouri River on the Pony Express Bridges. From the western junction with K-383 to the Missouri state line, US-36 is part of the National Highway System.

Except for wider sections in towns and passing lanes on hills, US-36 through Kansas is mostly a two-lane surface road. However some of the principal intersections all along the road are grade-separated diamond interchanges. From the Little Blue River just west of the K-148 junction to the US-77 North junction just west of the Big Blue River at Marysville, US-36 is a four-lane divided surface highway. From Hiawatha to west of Wathena, the road is a two-lane freeway. After passing through Wathena as a surface street (Riverside High School in Wathena fronts the westbound lanes), it becomes a four-lane freeway to the Missouri state line.

=== Missouri ===
US 36 across Missouri is a four-lane expressway with some freeway sections, passing through or near St. Joseph, Cameron, Chillicothe, Brookfield, Macon, Monroe City and Hannibal. Between I-35 in Cameron and the Illinois state line, it runs concurrently CKC (Route 110) and forms part of the principal route between Kansas City and Chicago. Just prior to crossing the Mark Twain Memorial Bridge, US 36 also encounters the western terminus of I-72 and all three routes run concurrently into Illinois.

=== Illinois ===
In the state of Illinois, US 36 runs concurrently with much of I-72. It enters from Missouri across the Mississippi River on the Mark Twain Memorial Bridge, and runs east with the concurrency with the CKC (IL 110) ending when IL 110 diverges to follow I-172. US 36/I-72 then continue eastward, crossing I-55 in Springfield. At the US 51 bypass in Decatur, US 36 leaves I-72 and runs due east through downtown Decatur. US 36 then continues east, through Tuscola and several smaller communities, to the Indiana border.

=== Indiana ===
US 36 enters Indiana near Dana in Vermillion County. It then passes through the towns of Montezuma, Rockville, Bainbridge, Danville, and Avon before approaching Indianapolis. US 36 then joins I-465, traveling around the south side of the city (counter-clockwise in the eastbound direction). East of the city, US 36 exits onto Pendleton Pike and travels northeast. It passes through Lawrence, McCordsville, and Fortville before passing around the east side of Pendleton, where the route turns east. The route then travels mostly in a straight line, passing through Sulphur Springs, Losantville, Modoc, and Lynn before entering Ohio.

The former routing through Indianapolis consisted of Rockville Road, Washington Street, West Street/Michigan Road (the latter once Northwestern Avenue, now Dr. Martin Luther King, Jr. Street), 38th Street, and Pendleton Pike.

=== Ohio ===
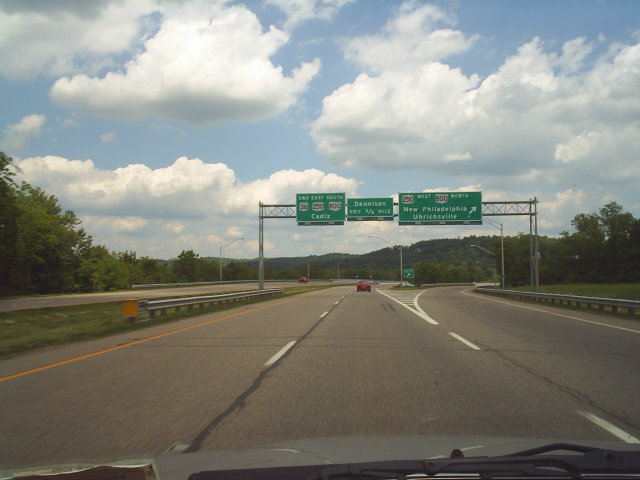
Eastern terminus of US 36 in Uhrichsville, OH

US 36 enters Ohio in Darke County near the small village of Palestine, after which it passes through Darke, Miami, Champaign, Union, Delaware, Knox, and Coshocton counties before reaching its terminus at Uhrichsville in Tuscarawas County. It travels concurrent with US 127 in Greenville for about 5 miles (8.0 km). Within the state, US 36 is classified as 83.1% rural and 16.9% urban with only 6.01 miles (9.67 km) coded as freeway (out of 204.88 miles (329.72 km) total). It also travels concurrent with US 33 in Marysville for about 5 miles (8.0 km). The Birthplace of Rutherford B. Hayes, 19th President of the United States, 17 E. William St., Delaware, is on the north side of US 36, approximately 0.2 miles (0.32 km) west of the US 23 overpass. The home was demolished in 1926 and the location is marked with a historical monument.

== Major intersections ==
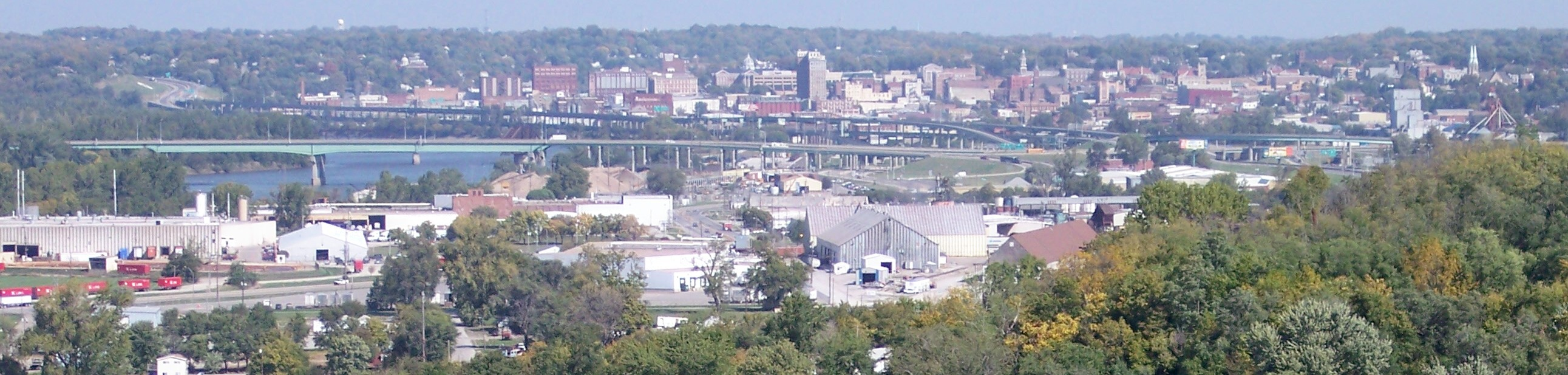
US 36 crossing the Missouri River on the Pony Express Bridge in St. Joseph. I-229 parallels the river.

Colorado
US 34 in Deer Ridge Junction
US 34 in Estes Park
US 287 in Westminster
I-25 / I-270 / US 87 on the Sherrelwood–Twin Lakes–Welby line. I-270/US 36 travels concurrently to Denver.
I-76 in Welby
US 6 / US 85 in Commerce City
I-70 / I-270 in Denver. I-70/US 36 travels concurrently to Byers.
I-225 on the Denver–Aurora city line
US 40 / US 287 in Aurora. The highways travel concurrently to Byers.
US 385 east of Idalia. The highways travel concurrently to northeast of Idalia.
Kansas
US 83 in Oberlin
US 283 in Norton
US 183 in Phillipsburg. The highways travel concurrently through the city.
US 281 in Smith Center. The highways travel concurrently to south of Lebanon.
US 81 in Belleville
US 77 in Marysville. The highways travel concurrently through the city.
US 75 west of Fairview
US 73 / US 159 in Hiawatha
Missouri
I-229 / US 59 in St. Joseph
US 169 in St. Joseph
I-29 / US 71 in St. Joseph
US 69 in Cameron
I-35 in Cameron
US 65 in Chillicothe
US 63 in Macon
US 24 in Monroe City. The highways travel concurrently to Miller Township.
I-72 / US 61 in Hannibal. I-72/US 36 travel concurrently to Harristown, Illinois.
Illinois
I-172 in Levee Township
US 54 in Griggsville Township
US 67 southwest of Jacksonville
I-55 in Springfield. The highways travel concurrently through the city.
US 51 in Harristown
US 45 in Tuscola Township
I-57 in Tuscola
US 150 on the Edgar–Ross township line
Indiana
US 41 in Rockville
US 231 in Monroe Township
I-74 / I-465 in Indianapolis. The highways travel concurrently through the city.
I-69 in Indianapolis. The highways travel concurrently through the city.
US 40 in Indianapolis. The highways travel concurrently through the city.
I-70 in Indianapolis
US 31 in Indianapolis. The highways travel concurrently through the city.
I-65 in Indianapolis
I-74 / US 421 in Indianapolis. US 36/US 421 travels concurrently through the city.
US 52 in Indianapolis. The highways travel concurrently through the city.
I-70 in Indianapolis
I-69 / I-465 / US 31 / US 52 / US 421 in Indianapolis
US 35 in Union Township
US 27 in Lynn
Ohio
US 127 in Neave Township. The highways travel concurrently to Greenville.
I-75 in Piqua
US 68 in Urbana
US 33 in Paris Township. The highways travel concurrently to Marysville.
US 23 / US 42 in Delaware
I-71 near Sunbury
US 62 at Millwood
I-77 near Newcomerstown
US 250 in Uhrichsville

== See also ==
- U.S. Route 136
