= Illinois Route 1 =

State highway in Illinois, United States

Illinois Route 1
- IL 1 highlighted in red

Route information
- Maintained by IDOT and CDOT
- Length: 323.06 mi (519.91 km)
- Existed: 1918–present

Major junctions
- South end: KY 91 / Cave-in-Rock Ferry in Cave-in-Rock
- US 45 in Norris City; I-64 in Grayville; US 50 in Lawrenceville; I-70 in Marshall; US 36 in Chrisman; I-74 in Danville; US 24 in Watseka; US 30 in Chicago Heights; I-80 Toll / I-294 Toll in East Hazel Crest; US 6 in Harvey
- North end: I-57 in Chicago

Location
- Country: United States
- State: Illinois
- Counties: Clark, Cook, Crawford, Edgar, Edwards, Gallatin, Hardin, Iroquois, Kankakee, Lawrence, Vermilion, Wabash, White, Will

Highway system
- Illinois State Highway System; Interstate; US; State; Tollways; Scenic
| ← I-490 | → IL 2 |

Illinois Route 1 (IL 1) is a state highway in the U.S. state of Illinois. Running parallel to the Indiana border, the highway starts at the free ferry crossing to Kentucky at Cave-in-Rock on the Ohio River and runs north to the south side of Chicago as Halsted Street at an intersection with Interstate 57. This is a distance of 325.59 miles (523.99 km).

== Route description ==
=== Cave-in-Rock to Birds ===
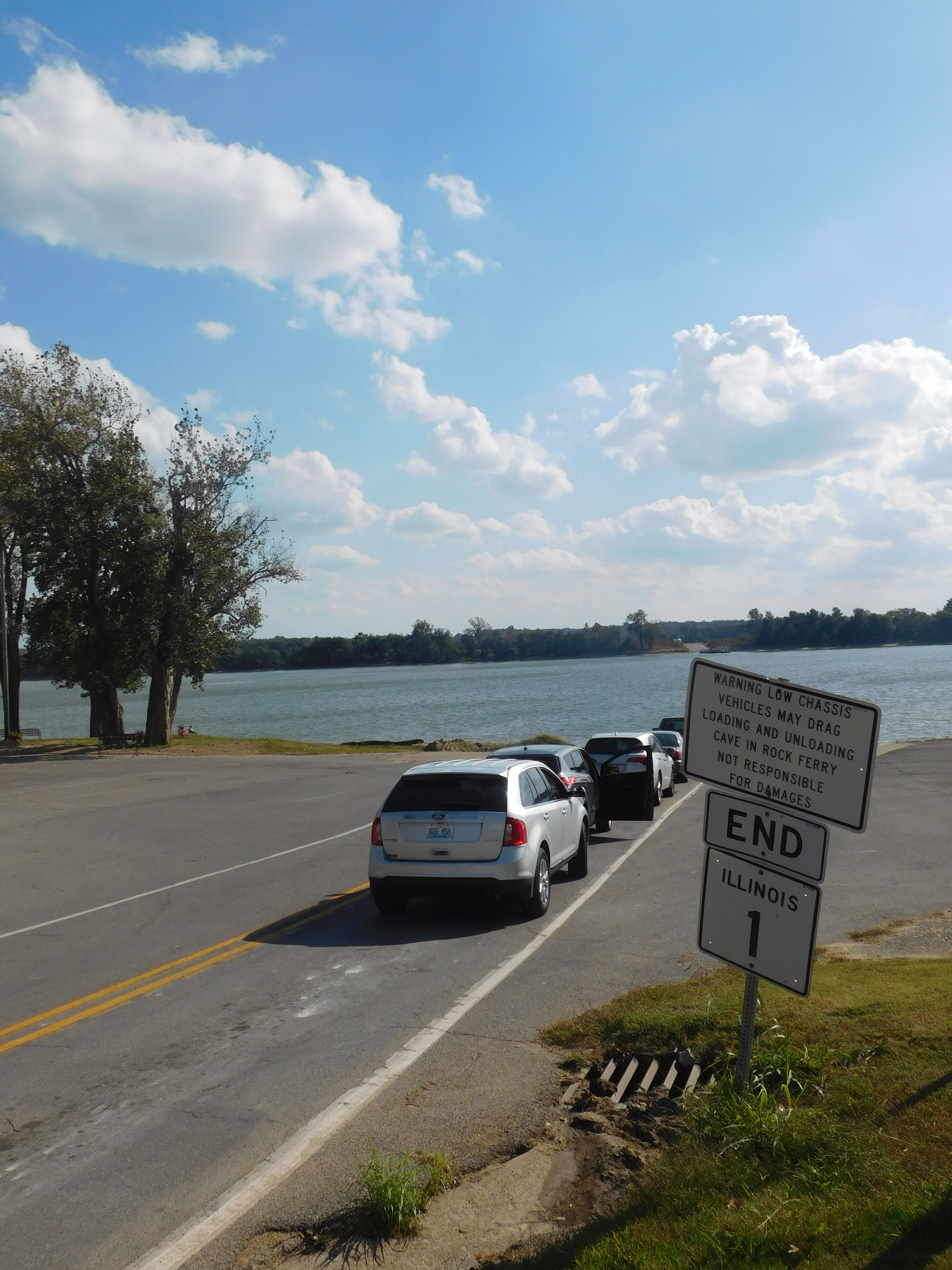
IL 1 south approaching the Cave-in-Rock ferry slip

IL 1 begins at the ferry dock for the Cave-in-Rock Ferry in the eponymous village of Cave-in-Rock along the Ohio River. A continuation of Kentucky Route 91 (KY 91), IL 1 begins its journey in the Shawnee National Forest, leaving the village of Cave-in-Rock for the hamlet of Loves Crossing, where it meets the eastern terminus of IL 146. For the next 20 miles (32 km), IL 1 winds north through the forest, reaching a junction with IL 13, which connects to Equality and Shawneetown. Further north, IL 1 remains a two-lane road when it junctions with IL 141 at the Gallatin–White county line. IL 1 soon reaches the village of Norris City, where it junctions with U.S. Route 45 (US 45). Here, IL 1 turns northeast and bypasses the village.

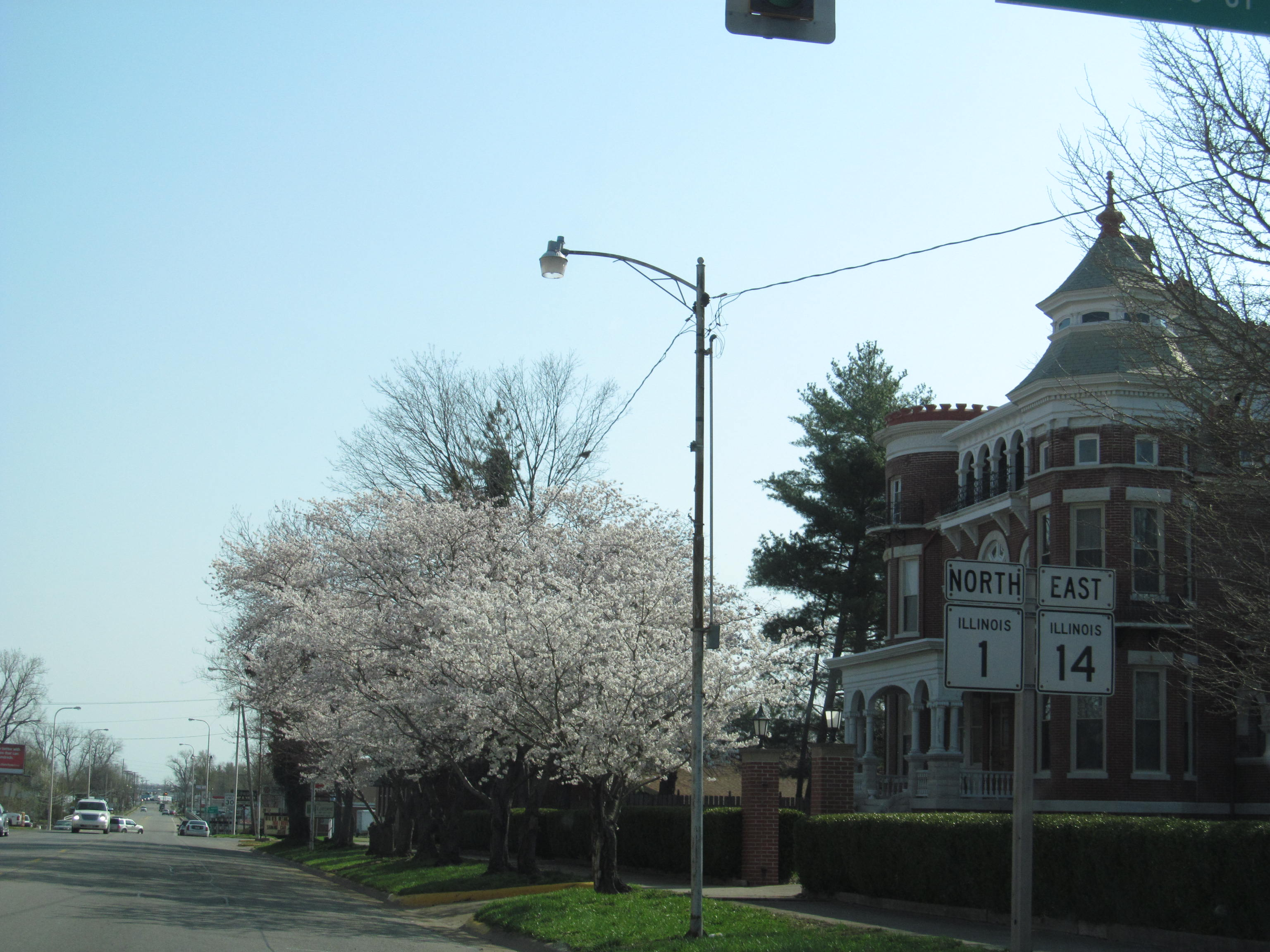
IL 1 and IL 14

Continuing northeast for 13 miles (21 km), the route reaches the city of Carmi. In Carmi, IL 1 is known as West Main Street, paralleling nearby IL 14. At the junction of Oak Street and West Main Street, IL 1 and IL 14 run concurrently. IL 1 and IL 14 follow East Main Street out of downtown Carmi, changing names to Cross Street as it enters the village of Crossville. In Crossville, IL 1 and IL 14 split, with the latter turning east on East Main Street. IL 1 continues north on North Cross Street through Crossville before leaving the village. Returning to its northeast progression, the route passes the community of Calvin before reaching a junction with Interstate 64 (I-64, exit 130). The interchange marks the entrance to the village of Grayville. In Grayville, the route crosses the Edwards County line and reaches a junction with the southern end of IL 130 (Hagedom Road).

After the village of Grayville, IL 1 turns northeast and runs along a general parallel with the Wabash River. The route passes through the village of Keensburg before reaching the village of Mount Carmel. Now in Wabash County, IL 1 runs northeast through the village as West Third Street. At the junction with Walnut Street, IL 1 meets IL 15, which connects to State Route 64 (SR 64) in Indiana. Continuing northeast, IL 1 and IL 15 run concurrently to the junction of North Market Street, where they turn northwest to the intersection with East Ninth Street. There, IL 1 and IL 15 split in different directions, with IL 15 heading southwest while IL 1 runs northeast on East Ninth Street. The route continues on East Ninth Street for two blocks, where the road turns northwest on North Cherry Street. Along North Cherry Street, IL 1 turns north and winds out of Mount Carmel.

IL 1 turns northeast north of Mount Carmel and returns to its parallel with the Wabash River. The road passes the village of Allendale before crossing the line into Lawrence County. At the community of Sand Barrens, IL 1 passes east of the Mount Carmel Municipal Airport and west of the village of St. Francisville. The route continues straight north until reaching the village of Lawrenceville. In Lawrenceville, IL 1 is known as 15th Street. At State Street, the route junctions with US 50 Business, which connects to IL 250 and US 50. After leaving downtown Lawrenceville, the route meets US 50 at a grade-separated interchange. For the next 19 miles (31 km), IL 1 continues straight north, reaching the Crawford County line near the community of Birds.

=== Robinson to Hoopeston ===
Passing to the east of the city of Robinson, IL 1 reaches a junction with IL 33. Meeting at the community of Gordons, IL 33 also connects to the village of Palestine. Several miles north, the route reaches Clover Street, which runs east in the village of Hutsonville, where it becomes Indiana's SR 154. Continuing north, IL 1 passes Lake Walton and crosses into Clark County. Through Clark County, the road makes several bends in various northern directions before reaching the city of Marshall. In Marshall, IL 1 is known as South Sixth Street before becoming Michigan Avenue. At the northern end of the city, IL 1 junctions with US 40. After crossing railroad tracks, IL 1 then meets Interstate 70 (exit 147).

After Marshall, IL 1 continues north and crosses into Edgar County. The route soon reaches the city of Paris, where it becomes South Main Street. After Jackson Street, the route becomes a one-way pair, with the northbound direction running along Main Street while the southbound directions runs on Monroe Street. At the junction with Jasper Street, IL 1 meets US 150, IL 16 and IL 133. IL 1 and US 150 run concurrently along Main and Monroe. The one-way pair ends at a junction with Elliot Street, where IL 1 and US 150 leave downtown Paris. The routes leave Paris and pass through the community of Wetzel at the Edgar County Airport. The two routes cross a junction with US 36, which marks the entrance to the village of Chrisman. In Chrisman, IL 1 and US 150 wind northeast as Pennsylvania Street, quickly departing the village.

IL 1 and US 150 cross into Vermilion County. In Vermilion County, the routes continue due north through the villages of Ridge Farm and Georgetown. Beginning in Georgetown, through Westville and Tilton to Danville, IL 1 and US 150 gain the moniker of Georgetown Road. Just north of West 14th Street in Tilton, the routes meet an interchange with I-74 (exit 215) before entering the city of Danville on South Gilbert Street. Just north of Memorial Bridge over the Vermilion River, US 150 turns west and US 136 joins IL from the east. IL 1 and US 136 continue north along North Gilbert until the junction with West Fairchild Street. They turn east on West Fairchild, going four blocks before turning north on North Vermilion Street.

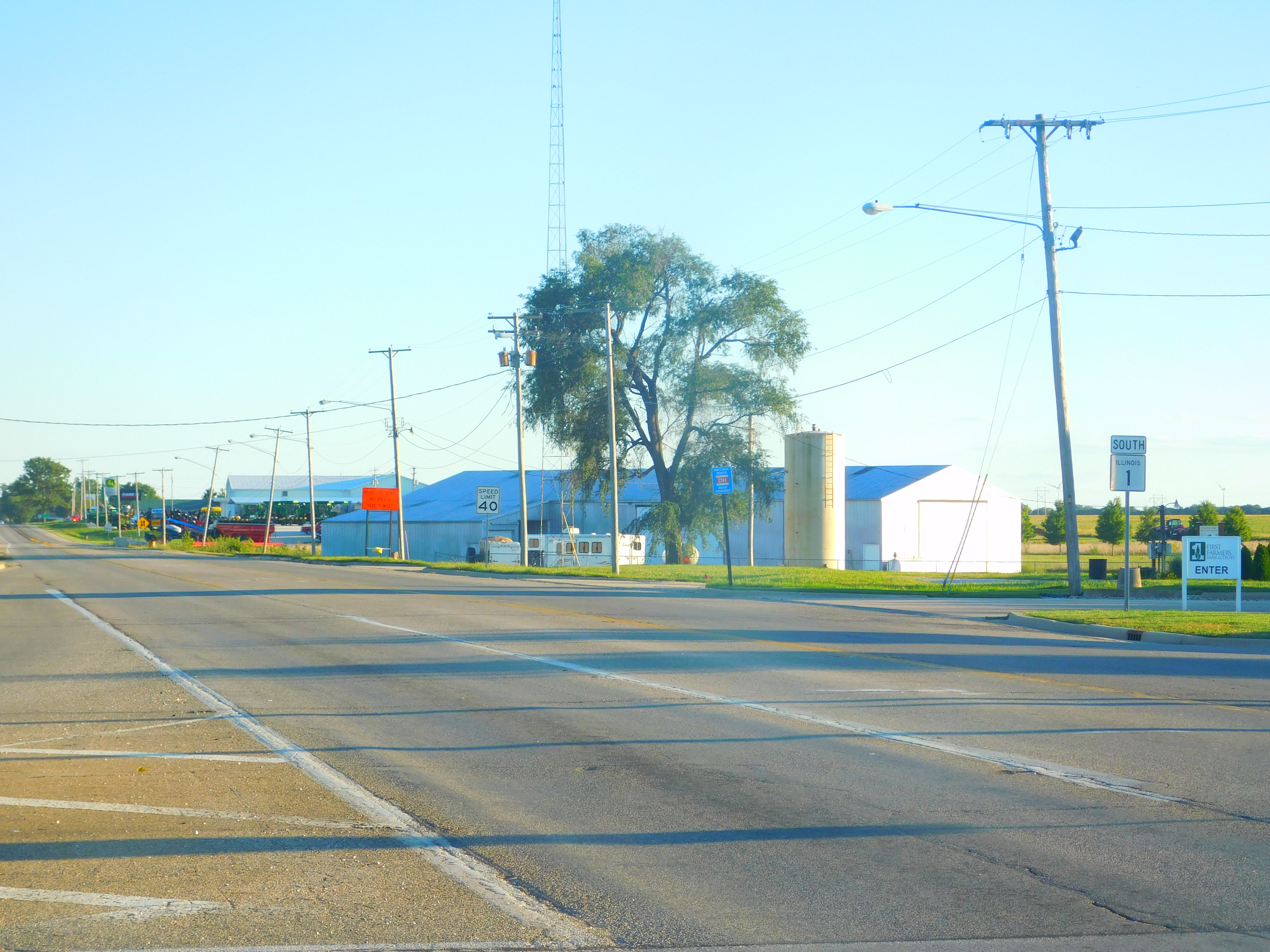
IL 1 running south from IL 9 in Hoopeston

Through Danville, IL 1 and US 136 continue north along North Vermilion Street until leaving the city. Seven miles north of Danville, US 136 turns west toward the village of Hennig at the junction with the western terminus of IL 119, which connects to State Road 28 in Indiana. IL 1 continues north through Rossville to Hoopeston, where it meets IL 9. Running along the westernmost end of Hoopeston, IL 1 is known as Chicago Road, crossing the Iroquois County line.

=== Hoopeston to Chicago ===
IL 1 leaves Hoopeston in Iroquois County, reaching the village of Milford. At Milford, IL 1 veers north-northeast for a short distance before returning to the north. At the eastern end of the city of Watseka, the route meets US 24 at a T-intersection. IL 1 and US 24 run concurrently, running west into Watseka. Known as East Walnut Street, the routes cross through downtown before turning northeast to a junction with West Lafayette Street. Now running west on West Lafayette Street, IL 1 and US 24 split, with the latter running west while IL 1 turns north on North Jefferson Street. The route crosses the Iroquois River and leaves Watseka. After Watseka, IL 1 continues north alongside railroad tracks, reaching a junction with US 52, 1.5 miles south of Martinton. North of Martinton, the route crosses the line into Kankakee County.

After crossing the county line, IL 1 continues north before turning east into the village of St. Anne. In St. Anne, the route turns north again, reaching the community of Sun River Terrace, where it meets IL 17, coming east from Kankakee. IL 1 and IL 17 become concurrent through Sun River Terrace, turning eastward as Dixie Highway. The roads bend north and enter the city of Momence. In Momence, the routes run east along the Kankakee River before reaching the northern terminus of IL 114. IL 1 and IL 17 run north through downtown Momence as Dixie Highway before leaving the city. The routes continue north until turning east into the village of Grant Park. At North Main Street, IL 1 and IL 17 turn north for several blocks before turning east and out of Grant Park. Just east of the village, IL 1 and IL 17 split. IL 1 turns north while IL 17 turns south.

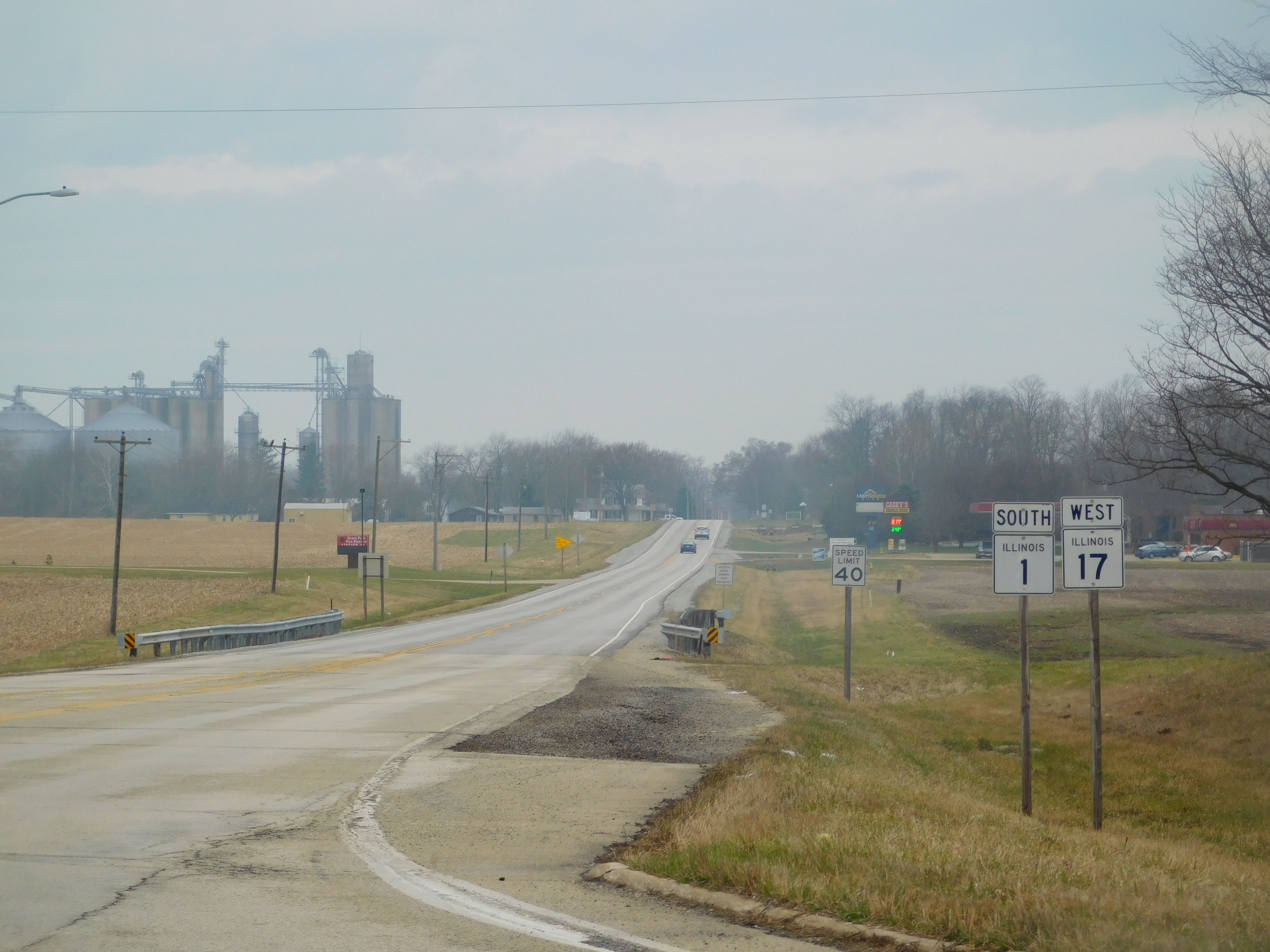
IL 1 and IL 17 at the concurrency junction east of Grant Park

IL 1 passes east of the community of Sollitt, the route crosses north into Will County. After the county line, IL 1 continues north and enters the village of Beecher. After the junction with Goodenow Road, IL 1 meets the southern terminus of the Bishop Ford Freeway (IL 394). At IL 394, IL 1 turns northwest along Dixie Highway into the village of Crete, where it becomes known as Main Street. Before leaving Crete, the route turns northwest and passes beneath right-of-way for the Union Pacific Railroad at Union Avenue and becomes known as Chicago Road. IL 1 then crosses the Cook County line in the village of Steger before continuing on to South Chicago Heights and Chicago Heights proper. At the junction with 14th Street/Lincoln Highway, IL 1 meets US 30. The route continues northwest to the Woodrow Wilson Forest Preserve, where it follows the Route 1 Cutoff to South Halsted Street.

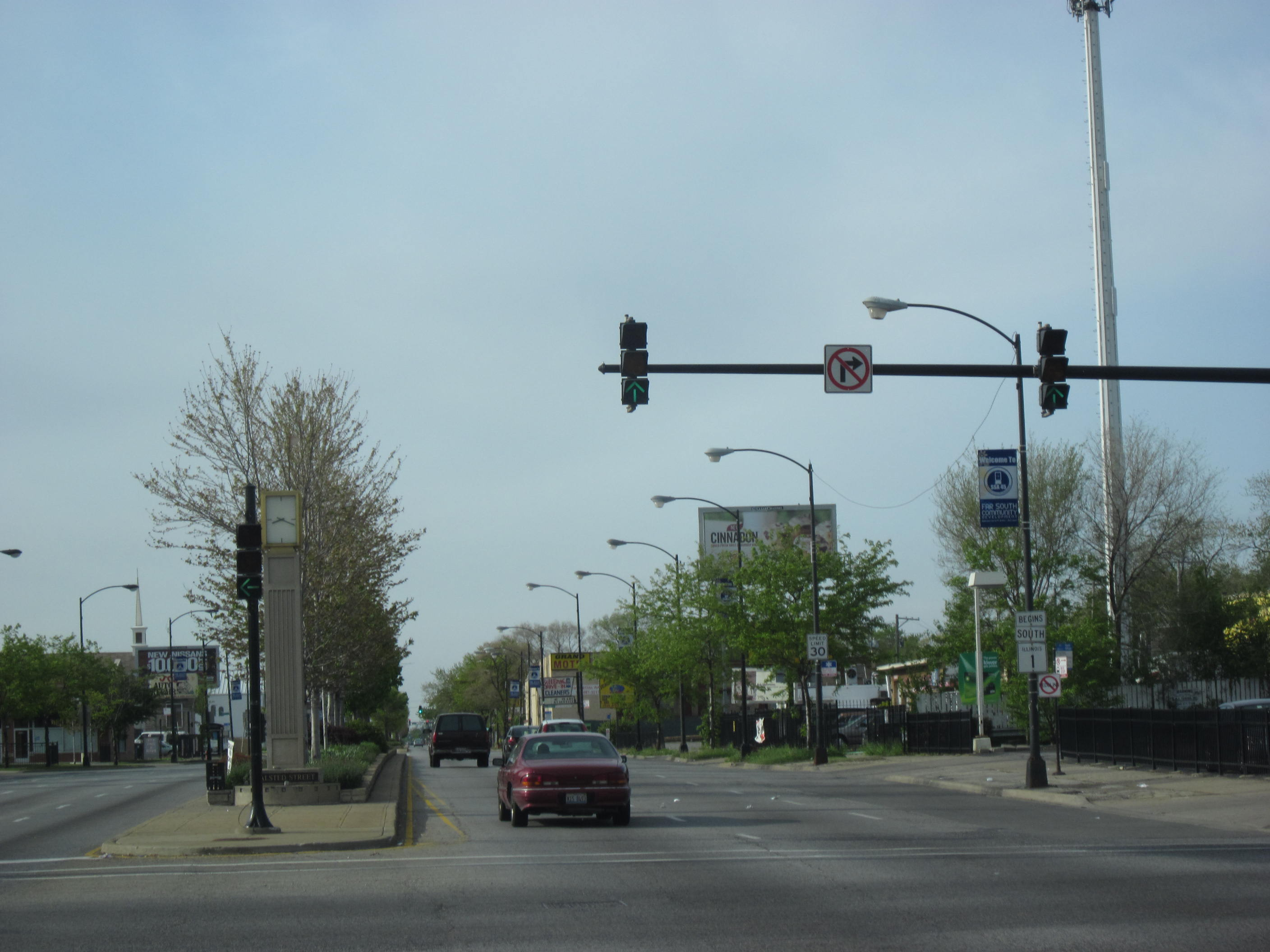
Northern terminus of IL 1, looking southbound from I-57

For the rest of its length, IL 1 follows South Halsted Street, soon reaching Holbrook and soon Glenwood. Passing through Homewood, the route reaches an interchange with I-80/I-294. At the junction with West 159th Street in Harvey, IL 1 meets US 6. The route soon turns northwest and crosses the Metra Electric District railroad tracks before reaching IL 83 at Sibley Boulevard (147th Street). IL 1 crosses over the Little Calumet River twice, passing through Riverdale and Dolton between the two crossings. Continuing along South Halsted, IL 1 passes east of the West Pullman Metra station near 122nd Street. At 99th Street, IL 1 ends at an interchange with I-57 (exit 357), but it continues from that point along its original routing as an unmarked local highway under IDOT jurisdiction.

== History ==
The northern portion of the Vincennes Trace or Vincennes Trail, an Indian trail which ran some 250 miles (400 km) to Vincennes, Indiana, was called Hubbard's Trace or Hubbard's Trail since it connected Fort Dearborn in Chicago with Gurdon Saltonstall Hubbard's more southerly trading outposts. It took on the name State Road after some state-funded improvements. Vincennes Avenue, one of Chicago's rare diagonal streets, is a vestige of the Vincennes Trace, and further south the trail eventually became IL 1. In its early days, State Road was unpaved and known for having mud so deep it was jokingly said that it could suck down a horse and buggy.

The Hubbard Trace was a wagon trail laid out by Gurdon Saltonstall Hubbard after he opened a trading post in Danville in 1828, located east of a former Kickapoo village. The trail went north through Hoopeston (Chicago Road) to Watseka, named after Hubbard's Potawatomi wife Watch–e–kee. From there the trail led to Hubbard and Noel La Vasseur's fur warehouse and trading post in Momence, named for Potawatomi chief Momenza. It then went north to Beecher and Blue Island, eventually becoming Vincennes Avenue and State Street to Fort Dearborn south of the Chicago River.

IL 1 was commissioned in 1918 as SBI Route 1. The original route had extended further along the northern end into Chicago along Vincennes Avenue and Michigan Avenue, and on the southern end from Norris City to Metropolis.

When US 45 was established from Norris City to Metropolis, IL 1 shifted east to Cave-In-Rock, replacing a part of Illinois Route 140 in the process. Kentucky Route 91 continues across the Ohio River.

In 1937, IL 1 was shifted southeast away from Albion to directly connect Mount Carmel and Grayville. Eventually, IL 15 and IL 130 replaced IL 1 to Albion.

In the 1950s, a freeway, then known as the Calumet Expressway, was constructed south from Chicago. This was designated IL 1, while the old highway along Halsted Street was signed Alternate IL 1 (Alt. IL 1). By 1964, IL 1 was restored to its old alignment, and IL 394 was applied to the expressway south of the portion designated as I-94 (the I-94 portion now being known as the Bishop Ford Freeway). At this time, IL 1 was discontinued north of I-57.

=== Dixie Highway ===
Dixie Highway sign

Lincoln Highway sign

Most of IL 1 north of Danville was part of the western division of the Dixie Highway, which goes through downstate Illinois and enters the Chicago area as it passes through Beecher. From here it follows the Vincennes Trail north and splits into the Bishop Ford Freeway (formerly the Calumet Expressway) and Chicago Road (one of the original roads into Chicago from the south). The Dixie Highway follows Chicago Road through Crete (where it is known as Main Street), Steger and South Chicago Heights (where it shares a junction with Sauk Trail).

As IL 1 continues north, it has a junction with Lincoln Highway (US 30) in Chicago Heights. This is sometimes known as the "Crossroads of the Nation", because it is the intersection of two major auto trails. This intersection helped cities such as Chicago Heights thrive in its early days. Approximately two blocks after this intersection, Dixie Highway splits from Chicago Road and continues north through Flossmoor and Homewood. At the north end of Homewood's downtown, the road turns and goes under the Illinois Central Railroad tracks, which now carries both the Metra Electric District and Amtrak trains. The road continues north through East Hazel Crest and past the Markham Rail Yards and under the Tri-State Tollway.

Past the tollway, the road enters Hazel Crest, Markham and then Harvey. As the road continues, creating a border between the towns of Dixmoor and Posen, its name changes to Western Avenue.

When the road enters Blue Island, it splits into two streets, (Western and Gregory), and realigns itself into one when it reaches Burr Oak Avenue. The road then enters the city of Chicago. Through Chicago, Western Avenue is a major boulevard, which continues north through the city to the town of Evanston (where it is named Asbury Street), which is where the Dixie Highway ends.

== Major intersections ==
| County | Location | mi | km | Destinations | Notes |
|---|---|---|---|---|---|
| Hardin | Cave-in-Rock | 0.00 | 0.00 | Cave-In-Rock Ferry | |
| Hardin | Loves Corner | 2.03 | 3.27 | IL 146 west – Elizabethtown | Eastern terminus of IL 146 |
| Gallatin | | 21.55 | 34.68 | IL 13 – Shawneetown, Harrisburg | |
| Gallatin | | | | Ridgway | Former spur of IL 140; state maintained |
| Gallatin–White county line | | 33.39 | 53.74 | IL 141 – New Haven, Evansville | |
| White | | 37.88 | 60.96 | US 45 – Norris City, Eldorado | |
| White | | | | Norris City | Former US 45 Byp. north; state maintained |
| White | Carmi | 50.52 | 81.30 | IL 14 west / Lincoln Heritage Trail (Southern Branch) west – McLeansboro | Southern end of IL 14 / Lincoln Heritage Trail concurrency |
| White | Crossville | 58.16 | 93.60 | IL 14 east / Lincoln Heritage Trail (Southern Branch) east | Northern end of IL 14 / Lincoln Heritage Trail (Southern Branch) concurrency; southern end of Lincoln Heritage Trail (Eastern Branch) concurrency |
| White | Grayville | 64.26 | 103.42 | I-64 – St. Louis, Evansville | I-64 exit 130 |
| Edwards | Grayville | 67.13 | 108.04 | IL 130 north – Albion | |
| Wabash | Mount Carmel | 83.03 | 133.62 | IL 15 east (Walnut Street) – Princeton | Southern end of IL 15 concurrency |
| Wabash | Mount Carmel | 83.60 | 134.54 | IL 15 west – Albion | Northern end of IL 15 concurrency |
| Lawrence | | | | St. Francisville | Former IL 137; state maintained |
| Lawrence | Lawrenceville | 106.78 | 171.85 | US 50 Bus. (State Street) | |
| Lawrence | | 107.47 | 172.96 | US 50 – Vincennes, Olney | Interchange |
| Crawford | | | | Flat Rock | Former IL 136; state maintained |
| Crawford | Gordon | 126.05 | 202.86 | IL 33 – Robinson, Palestine, Airport | |
| Crawford | Trimble | | | Robinson Road – Robinson | Former IL 33; state maintained |
| Crawford | | | | Hutsonville Road – Hutsonville, Sullivan, Ind. | Former IL 135; state maintained; to IN 154 |
| Clark | Marshall | 153.06 | 246.33 | Lincoln Heritage Trail (Eastern Branch) north (South 6th Street) | Northern end of Lincoln Heritage Trail concurrency |
| Clark | Marshall | 153.34 | 246.78 | Historic National Road (Archer Avenue) | Former US 40; state maintained (outside Marshall) |
| Clark | Marshall | 154.25 | 248.24 | US 40 – Casey, Terre Haute | |
| Clark | Marshall | 155.40 | 250.09 | I-70 – Effingham, Terre Haute | I-70 exit 147 |
| Edgar | Paris | 168.27 | 270.80 | US 150 east / IL 16 west / IL 133 west (Jasper Street) – Charleston, Arcola, Terre Haute | Southern end of US 150 concurrency |
| Edgar | Chrisman | 181.36 | 291.87 | US 36 – Decatur, Indianapolis | |
| Vermilion | Georgetown | | | West Street – Indianola | State maintained (outside Georgetown) |
| Vermilion | Georgetown | | | Mill Road – Cayuga | State maintained (outside Georgetown); to IN 234 |
| Vermilion | Tilton | 203.01 | 326.71 | 14th Street | Interchange; state maintained (outside Tilton) |
| Vermilion | Tilton | 203.23 | 327.07 | I-74 – Champaign, Indianapolis | I-74 exit 215 |
| Vermilion | Danville | 204.59 | 329.26 | US 136 east / US 150 west (Main Street) – Urbana, Business District | Northern end of US 150 concurrency; southern end of US 136 concurrency |
| Vermilion | Moores Corner | | | Jamesburg Bismarck Road – Jamesburg, Bismarck | State maintained to Bismarck |
| Vermilion | | 217.17 | 349.50 | US 136 west / IL 119 east – Rantoul, Alvin | Northern end of US 136 concurrency |
| Vermilion | Hoopeston | 228.36 | 367.51 | IL 9 – Rankin, Lafayette | |
| Iroquois | Watseka | 250.47 | 403.09 | US 24 east – Sheldon | Southern end of US 24 concurrency |
| Iroquois | Watseka | 253.14 | 407.39 | US 24 west – Gilman | Northern end of US 24 concurrency |
| Iroquois | | 260.99 | 420.02 | US 52 – Kankakee, Sheldon | |
| Kankakee | | 277.51 | 446.61 | IL 17 west – Kankakee | Southern end of IL 17 concurrency |
| Kankakee | Momence | 282.89 | 455.27 | IL 114 east – Indiana | |
| Kankakee | | 290.27 | 467.14 | IL 17 east | Northern end of IL 17 concurrency |
| Will | Crete | 300.38 | 483.41 | IL 394 north – Chicago | Southern terminus of IL 394 |
| Cook | South Chicago Heights | 306.14 | 492.68 | Lincoln Highway east (Sauk Trail) | Southern end of Lincoln Highway concurrency |
| Cook | Chicago Heights | 307.89 | 495.50 | US 30 / Lincoln Highway west | Northern end of Lincoln Highway concurrency |
| Cook | East Hazel Crest | 313.07 | 503.84 | I-80 Toll / I-294 Toll (Tri-State Tollway) to I-94 – Indiana, Wisconsin, Iowa | I-294 exit 2 |
| Cook | Harvey | 314.61 | 506.32 | US 6 (159th Street) | |
| Cook | Harvey | 316.13 | 508.76 | IL 83 (Sibley Boulevard) | |
| Cook | Chicago | 322.48 | 518.98 | I-57 to I-94 | Northern terminus of IL 1; I-57 exit 357; roadway continues as Halsted Street |
1.000 mi = 1.609 km; 1.000 km = 0.621 mi: Concurrency terminus
