= Chrisman, Illinois =

City in the United States

Chrisman
- City
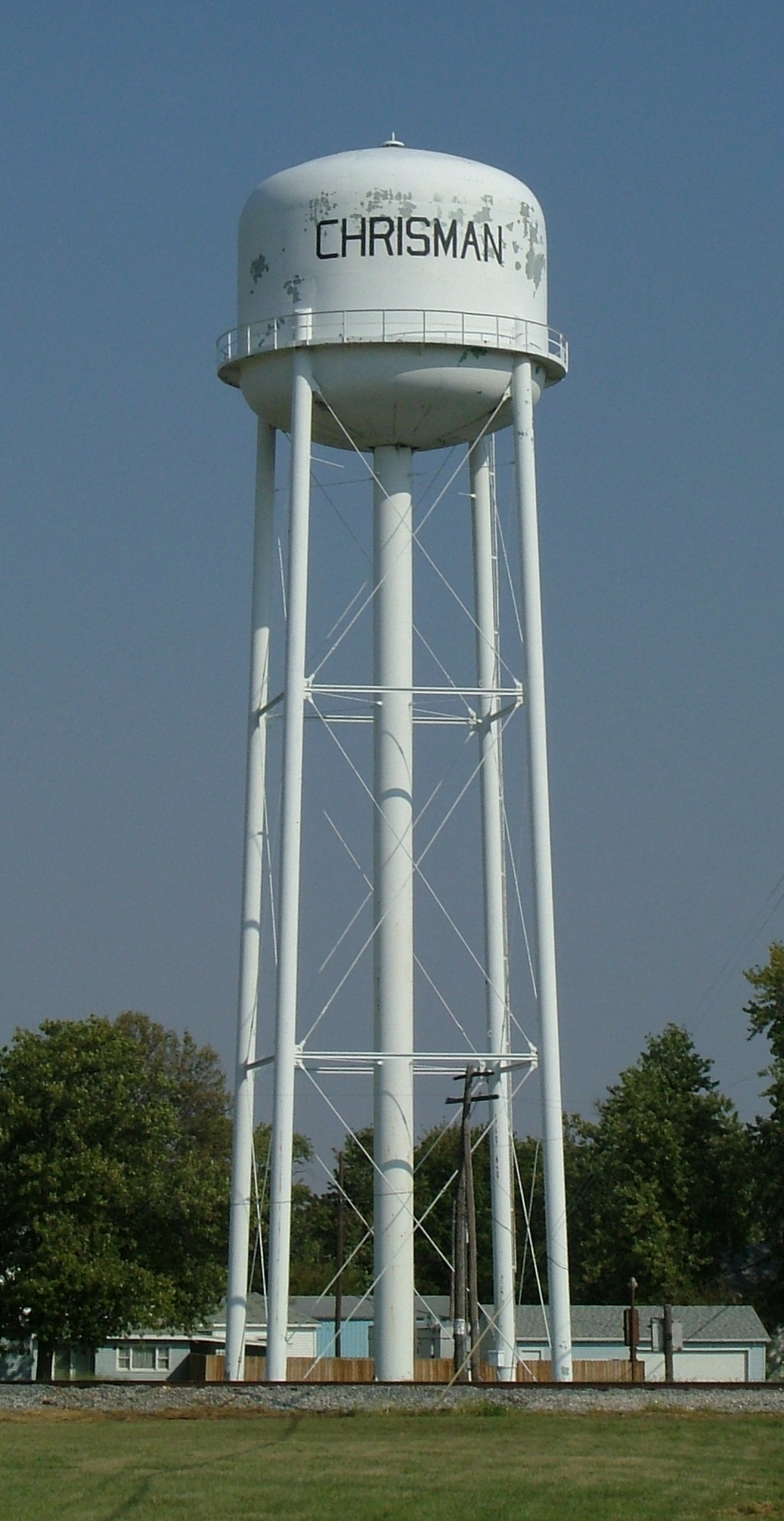
- The water tower in Chrisman

- Location of Chrisman in Edgar County, Illinois.

- Chrisman's location in Edgar County
- Coordinates: 39°48′16″N 87°40′30″W
- Country: USA
- State: Illinois
- County: Edgar
- Township: Ross

Area
  - Total: 0.72 sq mi (1.86 km^{2})
  - Land: 0.72 sq mi (1.86 km^{2})
  - Water: 0 sq mi (0.00 km^{2})
- Elevation: 643 ft (196 m)

Population (2020)
  - Total: 1,312
  - Density: 1,825.5/sq mi (704.83/km^{2})
- Time zone: UTC-6 (CST)
  - Summer (DST): UTC-5 (CDT)
- ZIP code: 61924
- Area code: 217
- FIPS code: 17–14273
- GNIS feature ID: 2393520
- Website: chrismanil.org

Chrisman is a city in Ross Township, Edgar County, Illinois, United States. The population was 1,312 at the 2020 census.

== History ==
Chrisman was founded on land originally owned by a man named Abraham Smith, who moved to Ross Township in 1840. In 1851, Smith sold his farmland to John Chrisman who then built his home on the land where the Nazarene Church currently stands. Chrisman lived in this house until his death in 1870. Upon his death, the property, including the 800 acres of farmland, was inherited by his son, Mathias Chrisman. It is believed that at this time, around 20 other families were also living in the area.

Two years later, a county surveyor visited the area looking to identify a location for a new town. John Chrisman along with Charles Caraway and William Kenton assisted the surveyor. Kenton suggested that the new town should be named “Chrisman” in honor of the current landowner. The town was established on 100 acres of land and, for a few months, was known as “Dolly Varden”. Ultimately, it was renamed to Chrisman and has remained that way ever since.

== Geography ==
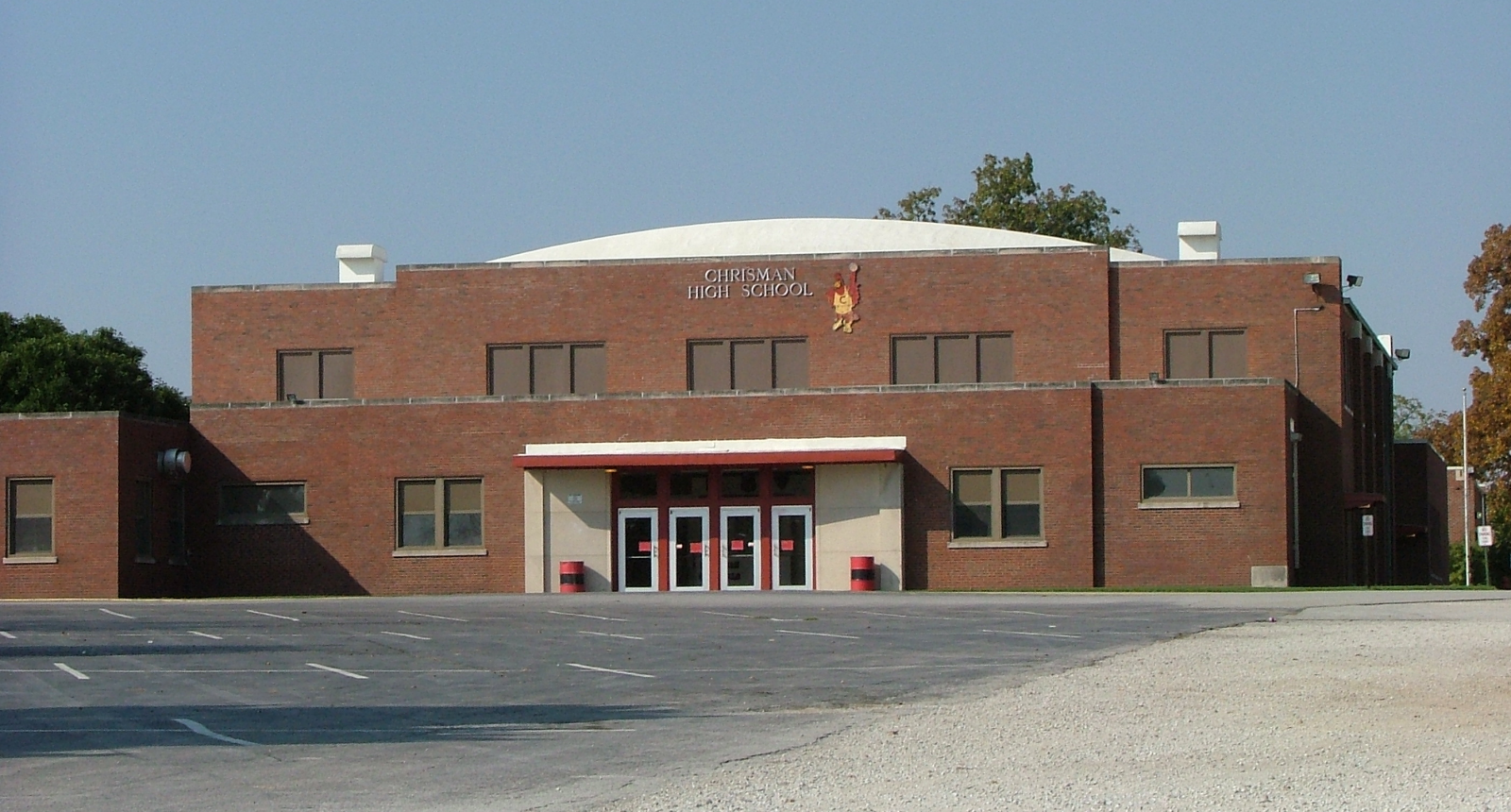
Chrisman High School

Chrisman is located on U.S. Route 150 less than a mile north of its intersection with U.S. Route 36. Two railroad lines intersect in Chrisman, both operated by CSX Transportation.

According to the 2010 census, Chrisman has a total area of 0.75 square miles (1.94 km^{2}), all land.

== Demographics ==
Historical population
Census	Pop.	Note	%±
1880	541		—
1890	820		51.6%
1900	905		10.4%
1910	1,193		31.8%
1920	1,101		−7.7%
1930	1,092		−0.8%
1940	1,112		1.8%
1950	1,071		−3.7%
1960	1,221		14.0%
1970	1,285		5.2%
1980	1,413		10.0%
1990	1,136		−19.6%
2000	1,318		16.0%
2010	1,343		1.9%
2020	1,312		−2.3%
U.S. Decennial Census

=== 2020 census ===
As of the 2020 census, Chrisman had a population of 1,312. The median age was 49.4 years. 19.0% of residents were under the age of 18 and 29.0% of residents were 65 years of age or older. For every 100 females there were 71.5 males, and for every 100 females age 18 and over there were 69.0 males age 18 and over.

0.0% of residents lived in urban areas, while 100.0% lived in rural areas.

There were 497 households in Chrisman, of which 24.1% had children under the age of 18 living in them. Of all households, 42.7% were married-couple households, 16.9% were households with a male householder and no spouse or partner present, and 33.2% were households with a female householder and no spouse or partner present. About 38.4% of all households were made up of individuals and 21.9% had someone living alone who was 65 years of age or older.

The population density was 1,824.76 inhabitants per square mile (704.54/km^{2}). There were 559 housing units, of which 11.1% were vacant. The homeowner vacancy rate was 1.4% and the rental vacancy rate was 9.9%.

Racial composition as of the 2020 census
Race	Number	Percent
White	1,227	93.5%
Black or African American	8	0.6%
American Indian and Alaska Native	2	0.2%
Asian	6	0.5%
Native Hawaiian and Other Pacific Islander	0	0.0%
Some other race	14	1.1%
Two or more races	55	4.2%
Hispanic or Latino (of any race)	20	1.5%

=== Income and poverty ===
The median income for a household in the city was $51,042, and the median income for a family was $70,234. Males had a median income of $46,875 versus $30,529 for females. The per capita income for the city was $26,336. About 6.7% of families and 8.5% of the population were below the poverty line, including 6.1% of those under age 18 and 9.3% of those age 65 or over.

== Notable person ==
- Harry Woodyard, Illinois state legislator, lived in Chrisman
