= Paris Community Unit School District No. 4 =

School district in Edgar County, Illinois, United States

Address
- 15601 US Highway 150 Paris, Illinois, 61944; United States

District information
- Type: Public
- Grades: PreK–12
- NCES District ID: 1730780

Students and staff
- Students: 631
- District mascot: Eagles
- Colors: Blue and Gold

Other information
- Website: www.crestwood.k12.il.us

Paris Community Unit School District No. 4 (Paris CUSD 4) is a school district headquartered in Paris, Illinois. It operates a single school, Crestwood School.

Students in Kindergarten through 8th Grade attend Crestwood School. High school students attend Paris Cooperative High School.

It serves small portions of the Paris city limits and most of the surrounding unincorporated areas, as well as Vermilion.
