= Kansas City (disambiguation) =

Kansas City is a city in Missouri.

Kansas City may also refer to:

== Places ==
- Kansas City metropolitan area, a metropolitan area in Missouri and Kansas
- Kansas City, Kansas, a suburb of Kansas City, Missouri
- Kansas City, Oregon

== Music ==
- "Kansas City" (Leiber and Stoller song)
  - covered by Wilbert Harrison in 1959
- "Kansas City" (Sneaky Sound System song), 2008
- "Kansas City", a song from the 1943 musical Oklahoma!
- "Kansas City", a 1974 song by the Les Humphries Singers
- "Kansas City", a song by Melissa Etheridge from the 2012 album 4th Street Feeling
- "Kansas City", a song by The New Basement Tapes from the 2014 album Lost on the River: The New Basement Tapes
- "Kansas City", a 2000 song by Okkervil River
- "The Kansas City Song", a 1970 song by Buck Owens and the Buckaroos
- Kansas City jazz, a style of jazz that originated in the 1920s and 1930s
- Kansas City blues (music), a style of blues that developed in the 1940s

== Sports and games ==
- Kansas City Current, an American professional women's soccer team based in Kansas City, Kansas
- Kansas City Roos, the athletic program of the University of Missouri–Kansas City
- Kansas City (ABA), a former American Basketball Association team in Kansas City, Missouri
- FC Kansas City, a 2012–2017 NWSL team
- Kansas City lowball, a nickname for Deuce-to-seven lowball poker

== Transport ==
- City of Kansas City, a 1947 to 1968 Wabash Railroad streamliner train
- City of St. Louis (train), a Union Pacific streamliner train called City of Kansas City from 1968 to 1971,
- USS Kansas City, the name of several U.S. Navy ships

== Other ==
- Kansas City (film), a 1996 film by Robert Altman
- Diocese of Kansas City, the 1850–1947 name of what is now the Roman Catholic Diocese of Kansas City–Saint Joseph
- Kansas City standard, a digital data format for storing computer programs and data on music/audio cassette tapes
- Kansas City Shuffle

== See also ==
- North Kansas City, Missouri, an enclaved suburb of Kansas City, Missouri
- Max's Kansas City, a nightclub and restaurant in New York City, from 1965 to 1981
- List of cities in Kansas
- Kansas City Blues (disambiguation)
- Kansas (disambiguation)
- KC (disambiguation)
- KSC (disambiguation)
