= Sanuk =

Sanuk or Sanook may refer to:

- Sanuk (Thai culture), or sanook, the Thai word for 'fun' and a Thai cultural concept
- Sanuk (brand), a footwear brand owned by Lolë
- Sanuk, Iran, a village in Iran
- Sanook.com, a Thai website
