= Kansas Township, Illinois =

Kansas Township may refer to one of the following places in the State of Illinois:

- Kansas Township, Edgar County, Illinois
- Kansas Township, Woodford County, Illinois

See also

- Kansas (disambiguation)
