= Kansas (disambiguation) =

Kansas is a state in the United States.

Kansas may also refer to:

== Places in the United States ==
- Kansas Territory, a territory from 1854 to 1861, part of which became the state
- Kansas, Alabama, a town
- Kansas, Georgia, an unincorporated community
- Kansas, Illinois, a village
- Kansas, Indiana, a former unincorporated community
- Kansas, Kentucky, an unincorporated community
- Kansas, Ohio, a census-designated place
- Kansas, Oklahoma, a town
- Kansas Lake, Minnesota
- Kansas River, Kansas

== People ==
- Dave Kansas (born 1967), American journalist, formerly an editor of The Wall Street Journal
- Rocky Kansas (1893–1954), American boxer
- Carl Kansas Fields (1915–1995), American jazz drummer

== Film and television ==
- Kansas (film), a 1988 film starring Matt Dillon and Andrew McCarthy
- "Kansas" (Farscape episode)
- "Kansas" (Once Upon a Time), a third-season episode of the TV series Once Upon a Time
- Kansas, the main character played by Dennis Hopper in his 1971 film The Last Movie

== Music ==
- Kansas (band), a progressive rock band
  - Kansas (Kansas album), the 1974 self-titled debut album
- Kansas (Jennifer Knapp album), 1998
- "Kansas", a 1988 song by post-punk band The Wolfgang Press
- "Kansas", a 2005 song from the film The Muppets' Wizard of Oz
- "Kansas", a 2011 song from thee album Dead Throne by The Devil Wears Prada
- "Kansas", a 2012 song the mixtape I'm Up by Gucci Mane
- "Kansas", a 2018 song from the album The Now Now by Gorillaz
- "Kansas", a 2025 song by Rare Americans from their album (S)KiDS

== Other uses ==
- USS Kansas, the name of two U.S. Navy ships
- University of Kansas, Lawrence, Kansas
  - Kansas Jayhawks, the athletic program of the University of Kansas
- Kansas Koyotes, an indoor football team from 2003 to 2014
- 3124 Kansas, an asteroid

== See also ==
- Kansas City (disambiguation)
- Kansas Speedway, Kansas City, Kansas
- Kansasville, Wisconsin
