= Council Bluffs Railway =

The Council Bluffs Railway (reporting mark CBGR) was a shortline Class III railroad that handled freight switching operations in Council Bluffs, Iowa. It operated from May 1991 until July 2006, when it was sold to the Iowa Interstate Railroad. The Council Bluffs Railway was an OmniTRAX subsidiary.

== History ==
A subsidiary of OmniTRAX, the Council Bluffs Railway began operations in May 1991 when it took over the 30-mile terminal switching operations of the former Council Bluffs and Ottumwa Railway, which was a subsidiary of National Railway Systems and operated that trackage from 1989 to 1991. Prior to the Council Bluffs and Ottumwa's operation of that trackage, the track had belonged to the Iowa Southern Railroad. (The Iowa Southern once had operated a 61.5-mile former Norfolk and Western Railway (and Wabash Railroad prior to that) line between Council Bluffs, Iowa and Blanchard, Iowa, but in 1988, the Iowa Southern abandoned the line between Council Bluffs and Blanchard and scaled back its operations to just switching service in Council Bluffs.)

Like the Council Bluffs and Ottumwa Railway, the Council Bluffs Railway's headquarters were at the corner of 29th Avenue and High Street in Council Bluffs.

Although it was a subsidiary of OmniTRAX, the Council Bluffs Railway's actual parent company in the OmniTRAX family was the Great Western Railway Company of Iowa. That moniker was strictly a paper one, however.

In July 2006, the Iowa Interstate purchased the Council Bluffs Railway as a way to expand its intermodal operations and create greater capacity in its Council Bluffs terminal.
