= Kaidee =

Thai online shopping platform

Kaidee.com
- Company type: Subsidiary
- Headquarters: Bangkok, {{{location_country}}}
- Area served: Thailand
- Industry: E-commerce, Marketplace, Retail
- Parent: Carro
- Website: kaidee.com
- Launched: 2011; 15 years ago

Kaidee is an online shopping and classifieds platform in Thailand. Kaidee uses machine learning and big data algorithms to recommend products for its customers.

== History ==
Kaidee was originally branded as dealfish.co.th and was founded in September 2011 by Sanook.com, a Thai-language web portal and news website owned by Naspers. It was established as a standalone C2C website supporting classified listings but not transactions.

In March 2014, Dealfish was rebranded to OLX.co.th, to turn OLX into a single brand for its classified platform in alignment with the rest of its classified businesses in eleven countries.

In November 2014, OLX.co.th announced a merger to form a new joint venture, officially changing its name and brand to Kaidee.com, as a result of an agreement between Schibsted, Naspers, Telenor and Singapore Press Holdings to establish joint ventures for the development of online classifieds platforms in Thailand, Brazil, Indonesia and Bangladesh.

In 2018, Kaidee launched MocyKaidee to connect motorcycle buyers and sellers, FarmKaidee to connect farmers with wholesalers and direct customers, and BaanKaidee for users to buy, sell and rent properties.

In the same year, Allianz teamed up with Kaidee as an insurance provider for motor, home and contents, travel and personal accidents.

In April 2020, Dubai-based online classified solutions provider, Emerging Markets Property Group (EMPG) acquired Kaidee as part of its expansion in the ASEAN region.

In March 2023, Carro, a Singapore-based used car marketplace, added EMPG, the parent company of Kaidee, to its cap table.
