= Lole =

Lole may refer to:

- Carlos Reutemann (1942–2021), Argentine retired racing driver and politician nicknamed "Lole"
- Simon Lole (born 1957), choral director, organist, composer, arranger and broadcaster
- Lole language, spoken on Roti Island, Indonesia
- Lolë, an athletic apparel design and retail company based in Canada

== See also ==
- Lole y Manuel, a Spanish Romani musical duo
- Loles León (born 1950), Spanish actress
- LOLE, loss of load expectation in an electrical system
