= Council Bluffs and Ottumwa Railway =

20th century Iowa railway

The Council Bluffs and Ottumwa Railway (reporting mark CBOA) was a shortline Class III railroad that handled freight switching operations in Council Bluffs, Iowa. It operated from August 1989 until May 1991, when it was sold to the Council Bluffs Railway, an OmniTRAX subsidiary.

== History ==
A subsidiary of National Railway Systems in Castle Rock, Colorado, the Council Bluffs and Ottumwa Railway began operations on August 1, 1989, when it took over the operation of the former Iowa Southern Railroad. The Iowa Southern once had operated a 61.5-mile former Norfolk and Western Railway (and Wabash Railroad prior to that) line between Council Bluffs, Iowa and Blanchard, Iowa, but in 1988, the Iowa Southern abandoned the line between Council Bluffs and Blanchard and scaled back its operations to just switching service in Council Bluffs.

At the time that the Council Bluffs and Ottumwa Railway began operations in 1989, it was a operating switching service on 27 miles of trackage inside of Council Bluffs. The railroad's headquarters were at the corner of 29th Avenue and High Street in Council Bluffs.

In May 1991, the Council Bluffs and Ottumwa Railway's assets were sold to the Council Bluffs Railway, a subsidiary of OmniTRAX.
