= Delmar Boulevard station =

Railroad station in St. Louis, Missouri, U.S.

Delmar Boulevard
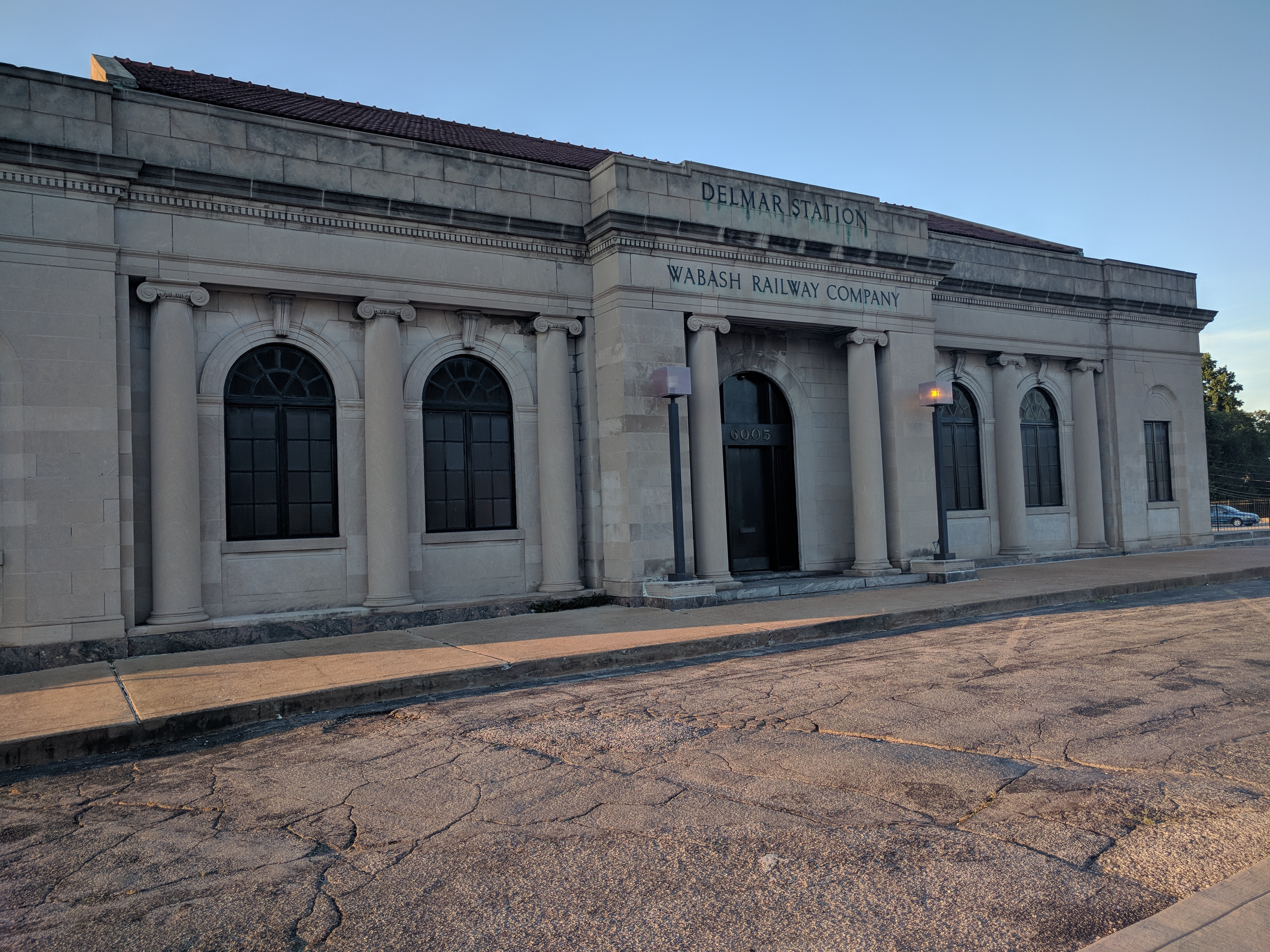
- The disused station building in 2018

General information
- Location: 6001 Delmar Boulevard; St. Louis, Missouri
- Coordinates: 38.6552°N 90.2944°W
- System: Former Wabash Railroad passenger rail station

History
- Opened: 1 August 1929
- Closed: 14 February 1970

Services
Preceding station	Wabash Railroad	Following station
Glen Echo toward Kansas City	Main Line	Vandeventer toward Chicago
Glen Echo toward Omaha	Omaha – St. Louis	Vandeventer toward St. Louis
Location

Delmar Boulevard station, also known as Delmar station, is a former railroad station on Delmar Boulevard in the West End neighborhood of St. Louis, Missouri. The Wabash Railroad opened it in 1929 as part of grade separation project which raised Delmar Boulevard over its tracks. Delmar Boulevard was one of several Wabash branch stations in St. Louis, but had special importance as a transfer station for intercity passengers.

The Norfolk and Western Railway, successor to the Wabash, closed the station in 1970. The MetroLink's Red Line was built over the former Wabash right-of-way and passes underneath the station. Metrolink built a new station, Delmar Loop, below the old building but does not use the structure.

== History ==
=== Construction ===
The city of St. Louis and the Wabash Railroad had been at loggerheads for years over the city's desire to eliminate grade crossings within the city and the railroad's disinclination to pay for such work. One such crossing was at Delmar Boulevard, in the West End, on the Wabash's route to Kansas City, Missouri. A station there, Delmar Avenue, provided passengers with a local alternative to Union Station, 5 miles (8.0 km) down the tracks.

In 1927 the city and the railroad came to an agreement over the reconstruction of the Delmar Boulevard area. The railroad tracks would be depressed, allowing a clearance of 18 feet (5.5 m) beneath Delmar Boulevard. The city would construct a new concrete viaduct to carry the boulevard, including streetcars, over the railroad tracks. Finally, the Wabash would construct a new station on Delmar Boulevard, sitting above the tracks.

Construction of the station, which cost $300,000, began after the new viaduct opened in June, 1928. The station was built from granite, limestone, and brick. The exterior style was Ionic, with multiple columns gracing the front. The interior of the station was finished in "marble, ornamental plaster, and bronze." The walls and floor were also marble, the latter from Tennessee. The station's waiting room could hold 72 passengers. Stairs and elevator carried passengers to the platforms below. The platforms, made of concrete, were 1,000 feet (300 m) long. Contemporary Wabash advertisements emphasized the "comfort" of the new station, and claimed that "no effort had been spared."

=== Operation ===
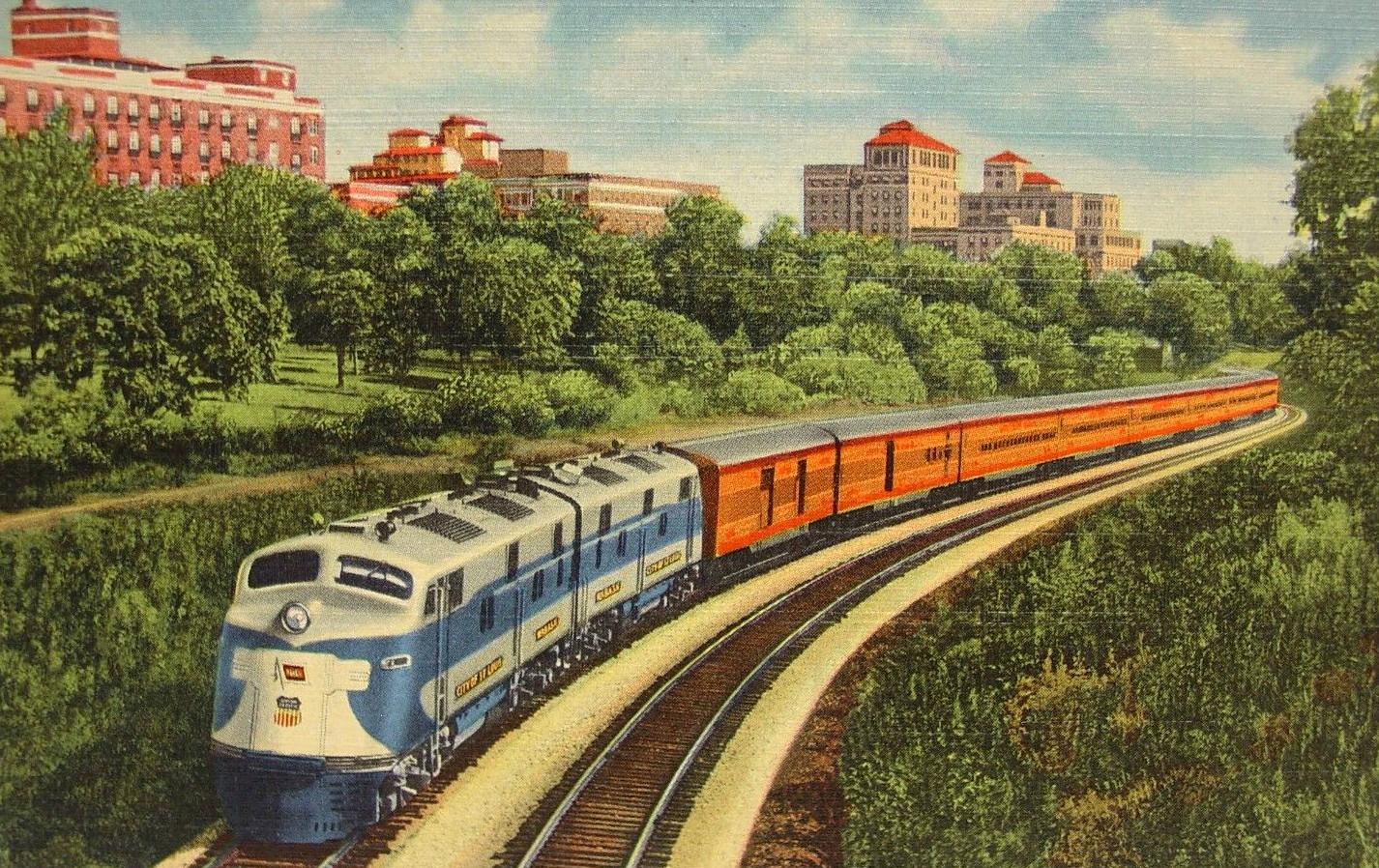
Postcard of the City of St. Louis passing through Forest Park, approaching Delmar.

The new station opened to the public on August 1, 1929, and for many years was an important part of St. Louis' transportation infrastructure and a catalyst for growth in the West End. At one time it handled 40% of all Wabash boardings in the city. Passengers changing trains, such as between the Wabash Cannon Ball and the City of St. Louis, would transfer at Delmar Boulevard instead of Union Station. The Wabash installed an escalator in 1947. Historian H. Roger Grant called it the "crown jewel" of the Wabash's station construction and renewal in the 1920s.

All Wabash long-distance passenger service to and from St. Louis Union Station made a last in/first out stop at the Delmar Boulevard station. Some suburban passenger service used an alternate route to the St. Louis riverfront but did not serve St. Louis Union Station.

Passenger train patronage declined in the United States after the Second World War. By 1966 Delmar Boulevard, now owned by the Norfolk and Western Railway, was the only remaining outlying or "branch" passenger station in St. Louis. At that time it still saw twelve trains daily and handled 200 passengers. Patronage continued to decline, and the Norfolk and Western closed the station on February 15, 1970.

=== Aftermath ===
When the station closed in 1970 the expectation was that it would be torn down. The station lay vacant until 1983 when the Norfolk and Western announced plans to demolish it, claiming that it was "structurally unsafe." Instead, it was sold to Mewhinney Corporation, a lighting supply firm, for $10,000. The corporation announced plans to renovate the interior and restore the 1929 appearance. As plans for the Red Line of the Metrolink light rail system went forward in 1989, using the former Wabash right-of-way, there were calls to incorporate the building into the planned station at Delmar Boulevard. Mehwinney attempted to sell the building to the Bi-State Development Agency, which was overseeing Metrolink, for $427,500. Bi-State rejected the offer as there was no budget for acquiring the building. Local businessman Joe Edwards bought the station in 2002; Washington University in St. Louis became a part-owner in 2016.

== See also ==
- Delmar Loop station
