= KC =

KC or Kc may refer to:

== Arts and entertainment ==
- KC (album), by KC Concepcion, 2010
- KC and the Sunshine Band, an American disco and funk band founded in 1973
- King Crimson, a British progressive rock band
- Kirk Cameron "K.C." Guthrie, a Degrassi: The Next Generation character
- K.C. Cooper, the title character in comedy TV series K.C. Undercover

== Businesses and organizations ==
=== Schools ===
- Kilgore College, Texas, US
- King's College, Hong Kong, a boys' secondary school
- Lone Star College–Kingwood, formerly Kingwood College (KC), in Kingwood, Houston, Texas, US
- Kishinchand Chellaram College (KC College), in Mumbai, Maharashtra, India
- Kuen Cheng High School (KCHS), in Kuala Lumpur, Malaysia

=== Other businesses ===
- KC HiLiTES, an American manufacturer of lights
- Kimberly-Clark, an American personal care corporation
- KCOM Group, formerly Kingston Communications and KC, a British communications and IT service provider
- Air Astana, IATA airline code KC

=== Other organizations ===
- The Kennel Club, the official kennel club of the UK

== People ==
- KC (surname), the Nepalese surname Khatri Chhetri, including a list of people with the name
- KCee (born 1979), Nigerian singer and songwriter
- Kent Cochrane ("Patient K.C.", 1951–2014), Canadian memory disorder patient
- KC Concepcion (actress) (born 1985), Filipino model, actress, singer, songwriter
- KC Concepcion (American football) (born 2004), American football wide receiver
- K. C. Potter (1939–2024), American academic administrator and LGBT rights activist
- Harry Wayne Casey (born 1951), American musician best known for his band KC and the Sunshine Band

== Places ==
- Kansas City metropolitan area, United States
  - Kansas City, Missouri, its principal city
- Karachay-Cherkessia, Russi, ISO 3166 code RU-KC

== Science and technology ==
- K_{c}, the equilibrium constant of a chemical reaction
- CXCL1 or KC, a cytokine
- Keratoconus, an eye disorder of the cornea
- Kilocycle per second, a unit of frequency now known as kilohertz

== Sports ==
- KC Stadium, now MKM Stadium, in Hull, England
- Kansas City Chiefs, an American Football team in Kansas City, US
- Kansas City Royals, an American baseball team in Kansas City, US
- Sporting Kansas City, or Sporting KC, a soccer team in Kansas City, US
- Karmine Corp, a French eSports organization

== Other uses ==
- King's Counsel, a senior lawyer, usually a barrister, appointed by the monarch of some Commonwealth realms
- KC, an obsolete postnominal for Knight of the Order of the Crescent

== See also ==
- Kansas City (disambiguation)
- Casey (disambiguation)
- Kcee (disambiguation)
