= Sanook.com =

Web portal and news website

Sanook
- Website type: Web portal, News, Entertainment, Internet forum
- Available in: Thai
- Owners: Tencent (Thailand) Co., Ltd.
- Creator: Poramate Minsiri
- Key people: Krittee Manoleehagul
- Website: www.sanook.com
- Commercial: Yes
- Registration: Optional
- Launched: September 14, 1998
- Current status: Active

The Sanook.com home page in 2020

Sanook.com (Thai: สนุก.คอม) is a Thai-language web portal and news website based in Thailand. It is among the country's most visited websites and one of the longest in operation, having been launched in 1998. The website is operated by Tencent (Thailand) Co., Ltd., previously known as Mweb (Thailand) from 1998 to 2007, and Sanook Online until 2016, when it was renamed to reflect its acquisition by China-based parent Tencent.

== History ==
Sanook's original logo was inspired by Yahoo!'s.

Sanook.com was founded in 1998 by Thai internet entrepreneur Poramate Minsiri. Back then, the Thai World Wide Web was still in its infancy, and Sanook, which started as a web directory, developed into the country's first major web portal and quickly became one of its top visited sites. Poramate experimented and added features according to social trends; one example was its collection of suggestions for cute and funny pager messages. The site's name, from the Thai word meaning "fun", as well as its original logo (stylized as SANOOK!), were inspired by Yahoo!'s.

In May 1999, Sanook was acquired by South Africa–based Naspers—which was creating a portfolio of global web properties as was the trend during the dot-com boom—through its subsidiary MIH, for an undisclosed sum, speculated to be in the range of multiple tens of millions of baht. Sanook.com, along with several other Thai web properties, became part of the Mweb (Thailand) Company, headed by Craig White. Mweb also launched another web portal, Mweb.co.th, with the aim of developing it as an international brand serving the region—at the expense of Sanook, a move contested by Poramate. Shortly after, however, the bursting of the dot-com bubble forced MIH to scale down its operations, leaving Mweb (Thailand) in the hand of Thai executives. Poramate left after the term of his contract ended, and later went on to establish Kapook.com, which would become one of Sanook's main competitors.

In 2006, MIH offloaded its holdings in the cable television operator UBC and the internet service provider KSC to True Corporation, leaving the web properties as Mweb's only remaining operations in Thailand. By then, Mweb.co.th had failed to establish itself and was discontinued, in favour of consolidating the company's web properties under the Sanook.com domain. The move was largely successful in retaining Sanook's position as the top visited website against rising competitor Kapook. Mweb (Thailand) was renamed to Sanook Online in 2007.

In October 2010, China-based internet giant Tencent (which is also partly owned by Sanook's parent Naspers) acquired a 49.92 percent stake in Sanook Online for 81.7 million Hong Kong dollars (US$10.52M). Thai analysts noted that this was a low figure for the country's most popular website, probably due partly to its amount of accumulated deficit, at 1,325 million baht (US$41M). The move was seen as paving the way for Tencent's active expansion into Thailand. Krittee Manoleehagul was brought on as managing director.

Tencent took full ownership of Sanook Online in 2012, which has since launched several new products. In 2016, the company was renamed to Tencent (Thailand). In addition to operating Sanook.com, it now oversees the Thai operations of Joox and WeChat, as well as other services.

Sanook.com has been ranked by web traffic analyzer Truehits as the top visited Thai website for every consecutive year since 2003 (when rankings were first announced), except in 2013 when it was overtaken by Kapook.com. (The popular internet forum Pantip.com does not participate in the ranking.)
