= KSC =

KSC may refer to:

- Kosovo Specialist Chambers, court of Kosovo
- Kansas State Collegian, university newspaper
- Kalinga language (ISO 639 language code ksc)
- Karlsruher SC, a German association football club
- Kate Sheppard Cup, women's association football cup competition in New Zealand
- Keene State College, New Hampshire, US
- Kelsey-Seybold Clinic, Houston, US, NASA-affiliated
- Kenana Sugar Company, a Sudanese sugar company
- Kennedy Space Center, Cape Canaveral, Florida, US
- Kenya Social Congress
- Kilogram-force per square centimetre
- Knights of Saint Columba, a UK Catholic lay society
- Knights of the Southern Cross, an Australian Catholic lay society
- Komunistická strana Československa (KSČ) (Czech/Slovak for the Communist Party of Czechoslovakia)
- Korean Service Corps, US Army battalion on the Korean Peninsula
- Košice International Airport (IATA airport code KSC), Slovakia
- KSC Commercial Internet, Thai company
- Kurtis Sport Car, US
