= Lolë =

Athletic apparel brand

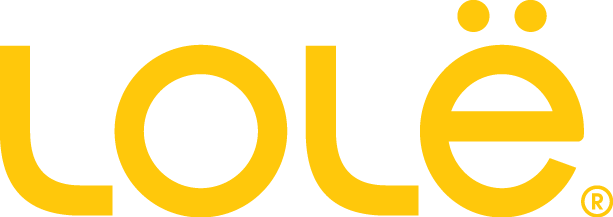

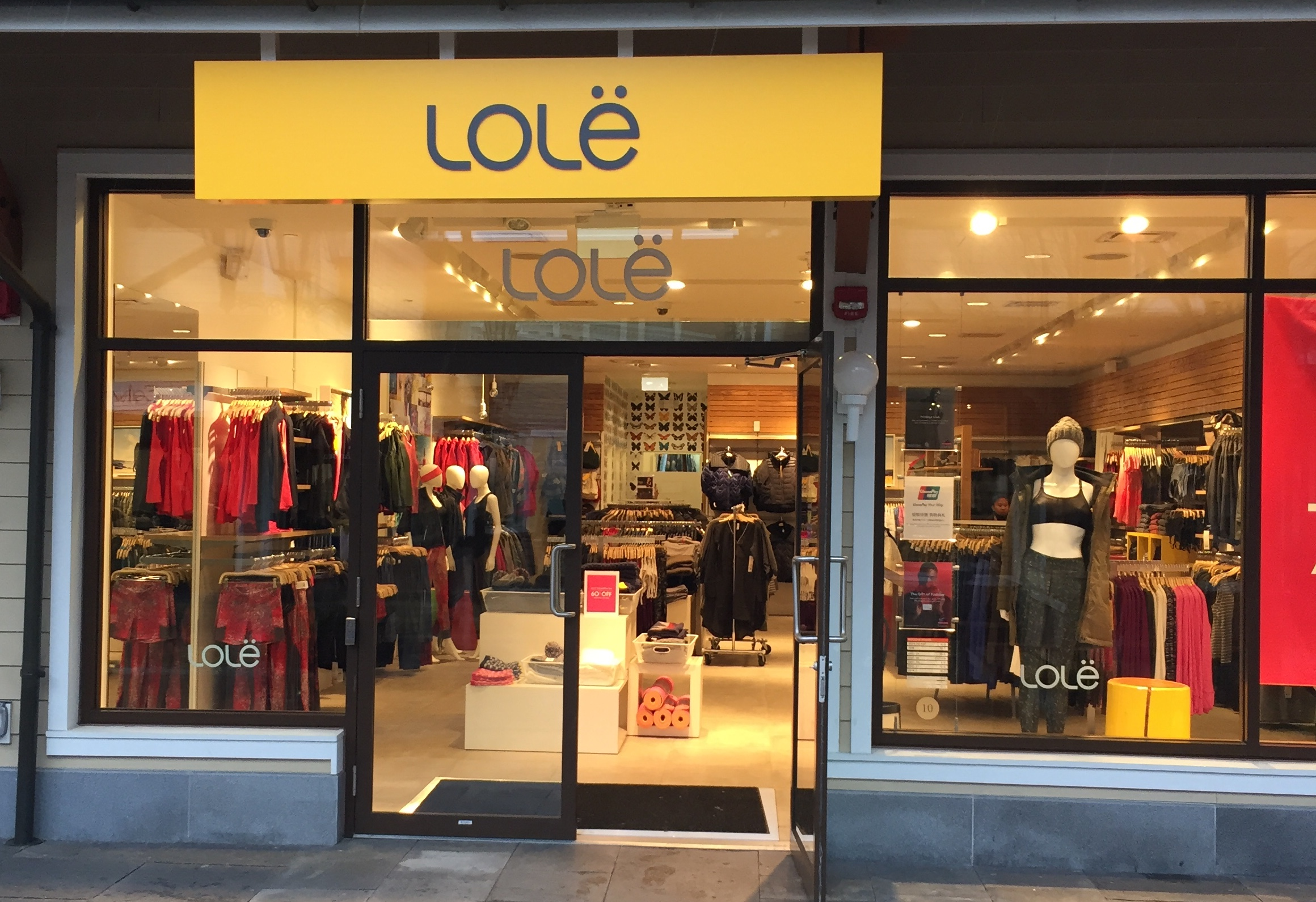
- Exterior of the Lolë store at the McArthurGlen Designer Outlet Vancouver Airport
- Type: Private
- Industry: Retail and Wholesale
- Founded: 2002; 24 years ago
- Founder: Evelyn Trempe
- Headquarters: Montreal, Quebec, Canada
- Number of locations: 6 (2024)
- Areas served: North America, Europe
- Key people: Todd Steele (CEO); Nicolas Beetez (COO); Raphael Groulx; Rob French; Nadine Garneau; Vanessa Marinesi
- Products: Athletic apparel
- Brands: Sanuk
- Parent: Lolë Brands Canada ULC
- Website: lolelife.com

Lolë is an athletic apparel designer and retailer based in Montreal, Quebec, Canada. The company was founded in 2002 by Evelyn Trempe. Bernard Mariette became the CEO in 2009. Lolë currently operates 5 stores in Canada and 1 store in the U.S. Much of its business is in wholesale, distributed to retailers like Nordstrom to be sold in stores. The company name Lolë is an acronym for 'Live out loud every day'.

== Sanuk ==
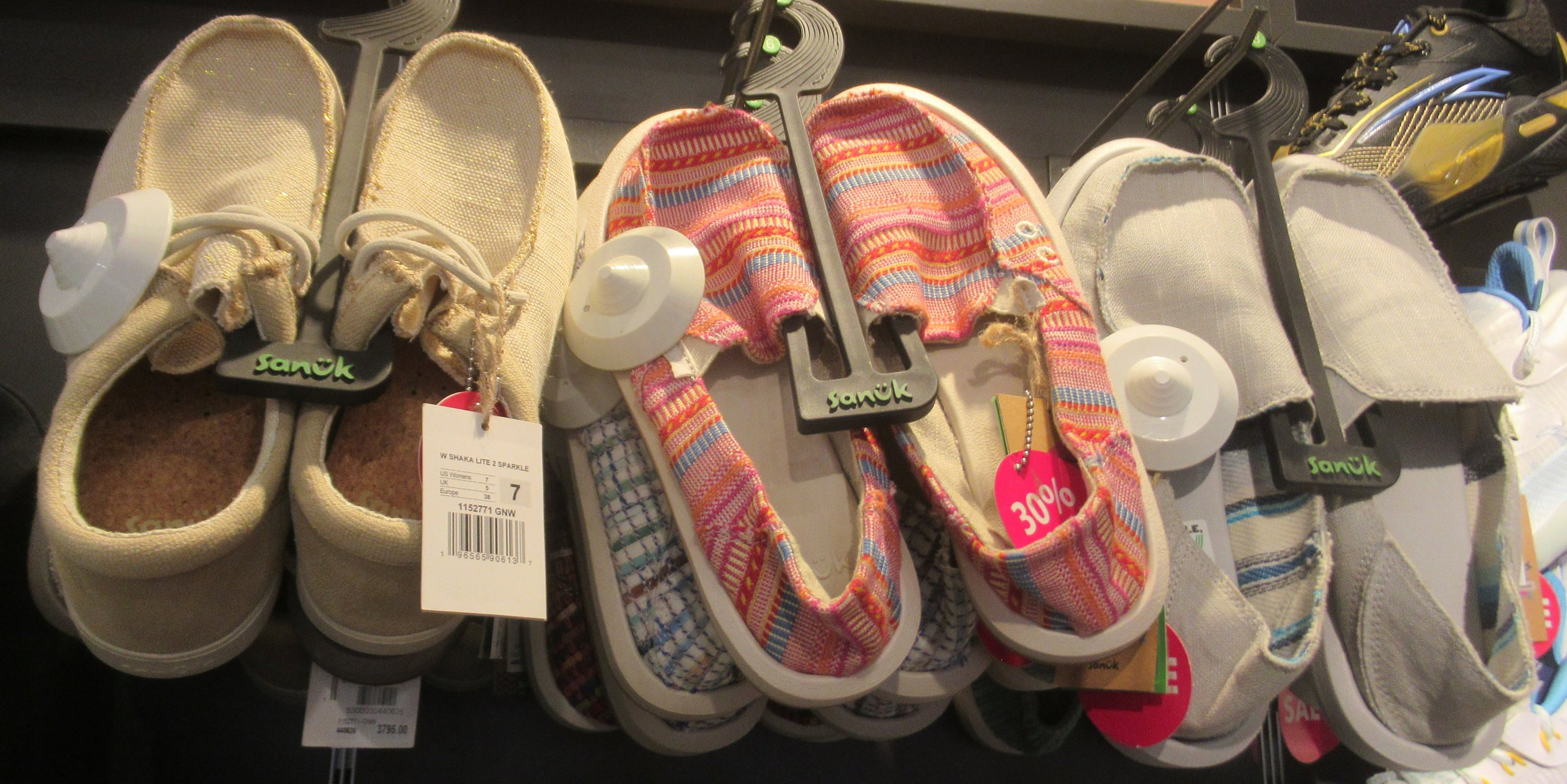
Sanuk sandals

Sanuk, a sandal brand based in Southern California, was founded in 1997. Sanuk is the Thai word for fun. Founder Jeff Kelley, a Southern California native, started by making sandals out of indoor-outdoor carpet and inner tubes. In 2010, Sanuk's "Yoga Mat Sandal" was awarded SIMA's "Footwear Product of the Year". Deckers Brands acquired Sanuk in 2011 for $120 million; Lolë acquired Sanuk in August 2024 for an undisclosed sum to Deckers Outdoor Corporation.
