= Wabash Cannonball =

American folk song

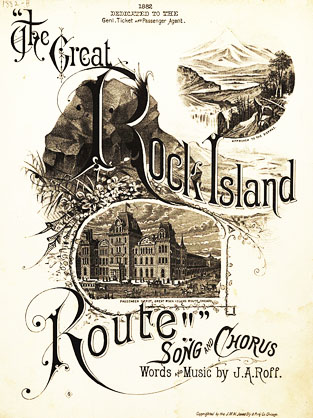
- Sheet music cover

Song
- Written: 19th century
- Genre: American folk music, country, bluegrass

"The Great Rock Island Route" (Roud 4228), popularized as "Wabash Cannonball" and also known by various other titles, is a 19th-century American folk song that describes the scenic beauty and predicaments of a fictional train, the Wabash Cannonball Express, as it travels on the Chicago, Rock Island and Pacific Railroad. The song has become a country music and marching band staple. The only train to actually bear the name was created in response to the song's popularity; the Wabash Railroad renamed its daytime express service between Detroit and St. Louis the Wabash Cannon Ball from 1949 until its discontinuation in 1971 during the formation of Amtrak.

The Carter Family made one of the first recordings of the song in 1929, though it was not released until 1932. Another popular version was recorded by Roy Acuff in 1936. The Acuff version is one of the fewer than forty singles to have ever sold 10 million physical copies worldwide.

The tune is also famously associated with Kansas State University athletics; in 2016, ESPN named its use by the team the top Big 12 football pregame ritual. It is also a signature song of the Indiana State University Marching Sycamores and the Purdue All-American Marching Band, as the ISU and Purdue campuses are adjacent to the Wabash River. It is also associated with the Stephen F. Austin State University Lumberjack Marching Band, the Kansas State University Marching Band, the Texas Tech University Goin' Band from Raiderland, and the University of Texas Longhorn Band. It was also used as the theme song by USS Wabash.

The song "The Wabash Cannonball" is part of The Rock and Roll Hall of Fame's 500 Songs that Shaped Rock and Roll list. It is the oldest song on the list.

== History ==
In addition to the Carter Family's 1929 recording and Roy Acuff's 1936 recording, many hillbilly artists recorded "The Wabash Cannonball" during the Great Depression era of the 1930s, and the song was also recorded by Piedmont blues musician Blind Willie McTell. Bing Crosby recorded the song for his album Bing Crosby Sings The Great Country Hits. The song increased in popularity during this time.

=== Origins ===
There are many theories of the origin of "The Wabash Cannonball". Utah Phillips states that hobos imagined a mythical train called the "Wabash Cannonball" which was a "death coach" that appeared at the death of a hobo to carry his soul to its reward. The song was then created with the lyrics and music telling the story of the train. When the hobos learned of this train, they called her the "Wabash Cannonball" and said that every station in America had heard her whistle.

Another story states that the song is based on a tall tale in which Cal S. Bunyan, Paul Bunyan's brother, constructed a railroad known as the Ireland, Jerusalem, Australian & Southern Michigan Line. After two months of service, the 700-car train was traveling so fast that it arrived at its destination an hour before its departure. Finally, the train took off so fast that it rushed into outer space and where, for all that is known, it is still traveling. Notably, the original 1936 story titled "Cal Bunyan's Ireland, Jerusalem, Australia & Southern Indiana Railroad" does not mention the Wabash Cannonball.

=== Lyrics ===
Over many years, this popular song's music has remained unchanged while the verses have been updated by song artists. As early as 1882, sheet music titled "The Great Rock Island Route" was credited to J. A. Roff. This version and all subsequent versions contain a variation of this chorus:

Now listen to the jingle, and the rumble, and the roar,
As she dashes thro' the woodland, and speeds along the shore,
See the mighty rushing engine, hear her merry bell ring out,
As they speed along in safety, on the "Great Rock-Island Route."

A rewritten version by William Kindt appeared in 1904 under the title "Wabash Cannon Ball".

A more modern version of the chorus—these lyrics sung by Boxcar Willie—is:

Listen to the jingle, the rumble and the roar
As she glides along the woodland o'er the hills and by the shore
Hear the mighty rush of the engine hear the lonesome hobo's call
As you travel across the country on the Wabash Cannonball

=== Namesakes ===
Due to the song's popularity, the Wabash Railroad renamed its daytime express run between Detroit and St. Louis as the Wabash Cannon Ball in 1949. The train carried that name until its discontinuation in 1971 during the creation of Amtrak.

On October 26 and 27, 2013, Fort Wayne Railroad Historical Society's Nickel Plate Road 765, in conjunction with the Norfolk Southern Railway's "21st Century Steam" program, pulled a 225-mile (362 km) round-trip excursion retracing the Cannon Ball's former route between Fort Wayne, Indiana, and Lafayette, Indiana.

A roller coaster named for the song at the now-defunct Opryland USA theme park in Nashville operated from 1975 to 1997. In 1998, after Opryland's closing, it was relocated to Old Indiana Fun-n-Water Park in Thorntown, Indiana. In 2003, it was moved into storage.

=== Use in collegiate sports ===
"The Wabash Cannonball" (arranged by Joel Leach) is known as the unofficial "second" fight song of Kansas State University (KSU), having been played since the late 1960s. It was the only piece of sheet music rescued from the KSU music department in the Nichols Hall fire of 1968, and grew in popularity with students and fans. The Kansas State University Marching Band (KSUMB) says that "the Wabash Cannonball has come to represent the survival of the underdog in the hearts and minds of all true K-State fans, and has earned a secure place in the KSUMB's history and traditions." Currently, Kansas State is the prime contributing player of the song and most noted with Big 12 Conference fans and spectators.

The Longhorn Band at the University of Texas plays the song at the beginning of every fourth quarter during football season. The tradition began when Texas was in the Southwest Conference and Kansas State University was in the Big Eight Conference. Texas band director Vincent R. DiNino once asked football coach Darrell K Royal if he had any songs he would like to hear the Longhorn Band play. Royal's response was that they did not play enough country music and that he would like to hear Wabash Cannonball. The band rivalry developed during the years that both schools were members of the Big 12 Conference.

At Stephen F. Austin State University, the Twirl-O-Jacks traditionally perform to the tune as played by the Lumberjack Marching Band at the beginning of each football game. The band has also been known to play excerpts from the song during various sporting events.

== Other recordings ==
Woody Guthrie, as the Dustbowl Balladeer, adapted the song for his "Grand Coulee Dam", one of several songs he wrote about the Grand Coulee Dam in Washington. He also composed another song, "Farmer-Labor Train", with the same melody. On August 29, 1942, he performed "The Farmer-Labor Train" on the AFL- and CIO-sponsored NBC radio show "Labor for Victory". In 1948, he transformed the "Wabash Cannonball" again into "The Wallace-Taylor Train" for the 1948 Progressive National Convention, which nominated former U.S. Vice President Henry A. Wallace for president. Alistair Cooke noted some verses:

Lumberjacks and teamsters,
And sailors from the sea,
And there's fighting boys from Texas
And the hills of Tennessee,
There's miners from Kentucky
And there's fishermen from Maine,
All a-ridin' with us
On this Wallace-Taylor train.

Baseball pitcher and sportscaster Dizzy Dean, while on the air during rain delays, was famous for off-key renditions of "Wabash Cannonball."

== See also ==
- List of train songs
