= Kansas, Illinois =

Kansas
- Village
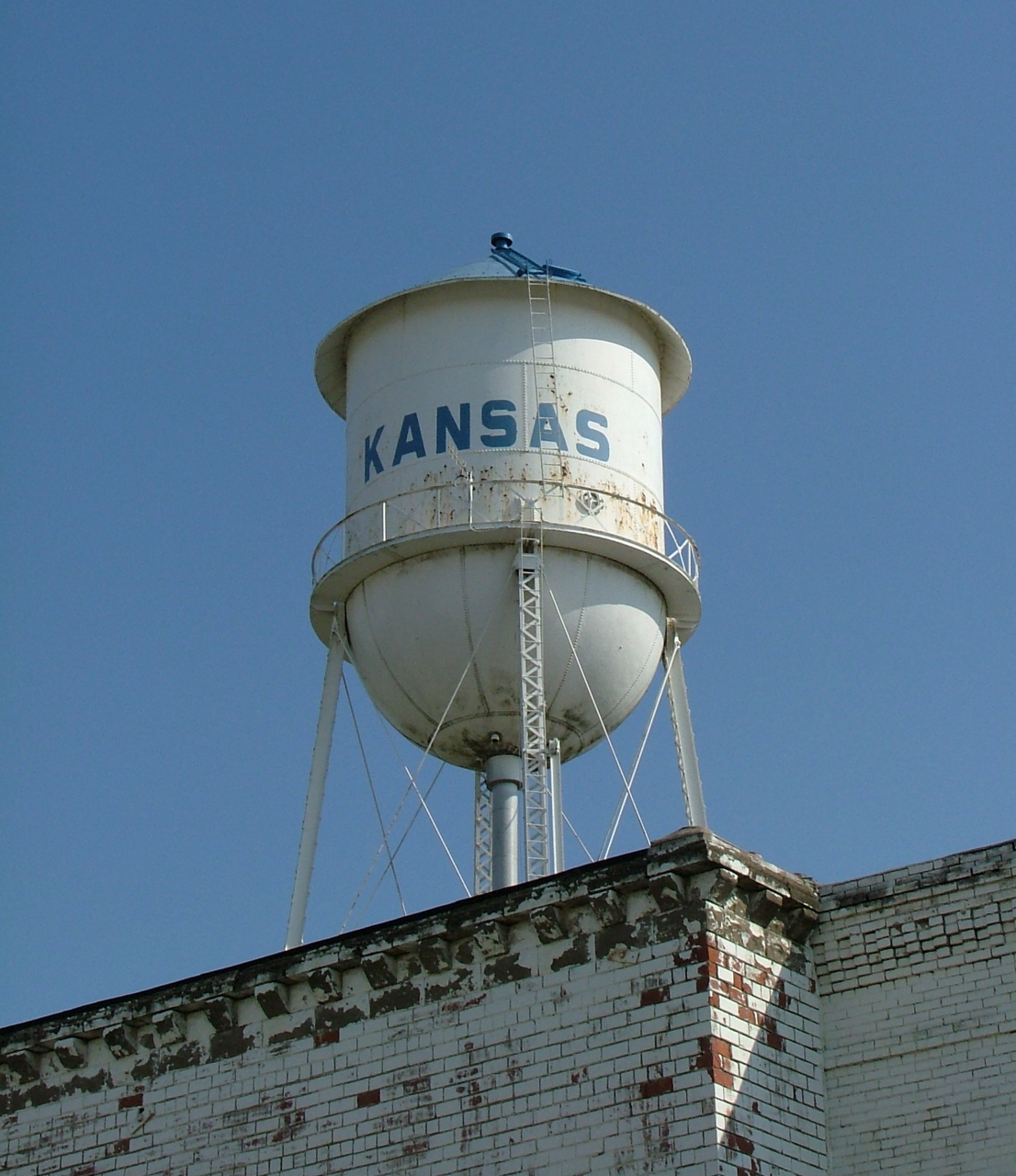
- The water tower in Kansas

- Location of Kansas in Edgar County, Illinois

- Location of Kansas in Edgar County, Illinois
- Coordinates: 39°33′16″N 87°56′22″W
- Country: USA
- State: Illinois
- County: Edgar
- Township: Kansas

Area
  - Total: 1.02 sq mi (2.65 km^{2})
  - Land: 1.02 sq mi (2.65 km^{2})
  - Water: 0 sq mi (0.00 km^{2})
- Elevation: 715 ft (218 m)

Population (2020)
  - Total: 670
  - Density: 655.7/sq mi (253.18/km^{2})
- Time zone: UTC-6 (CST)
  - Summer (DST): UTC-5 (CDT)
- ZIP Code: 61933
- Area code: 217
- FIPS code: 17–38986
- GNIS feature ID: 2398327

Kansas is a village in Kansas Township, Edgar County, Illinois. The population was 670 at the 2020 census.

== History ==
A post office called Kansas has been in operation since 1855. The town was named after the Kansas Territory.

In or before 1972, students and their physical education teacher at the high school invented a game called Deckerball. This has been credited as being the possible origin of the very similar game Wallyball.

== Geography ==
Kansas is located in southwest Edgar County approximately 1.2 miles from the Edgar-Coles county line. The community is at the intersection of Illinois routes 16 and 49 approximately ten miles southwest of Paris.

According to the 2010 census, Kansas has a total area of 1.03 square miles (2.67 km^{2}), all land.

== Demographics ==
Historical population
| Census | Pop. | Note | %± |
|---|---|---|---|
| 1880 | 723 | | — |
| 1890 | 1,037 | | 43.4% |
| 1900 | 1,049 | | 1.2% |
| 1910 | 945 | | −9.9% |
| 1920 | 944 | | −0.1% |
| 1930 | 900 | | −4.7% |
| 1940 | 875 | | −2.8% |
| 1950 | 835 | | −4.6% |
| 1960 | 815 | | −2.4% |
| 1970 | 779 | | −4.4% |
| 1980 | 791 | | 1.5% |
| 1990 | 887 | | 12.1% |
| 2000 | 842 | | −5.1% |
| 2010 | 787 | | −6.5% |
| 2020 | 670 | | −14.9% |
U.S. Decennial Census

As of the 2020 census there were 670 people, 339 households, and 183 families residing in the village. The population density was 655.58 inhabitants per square mile (253.12/km^{2}). There were 366 housing units at an average density of 358.12 units per square mile (138.27 units/km^{2}). The racial makeup of the village was 91.04% White, 1.04% African American, 0.30% Native American, 0.30% Asian, 0.15% from other races, and 7.16% from two or more races. Hispanic or Latino of any race were 1.49% of the population.

There were 339 households, out of which 32.7% had children under the age of 18 living with them, 38.05% were married couples living together, 12.98% had a female householder with no husband present, and 46.02% were non-families. 36.58% of all households were made up of individuals, and 19.76% had someone living alone who was 65 years of age or older. The average household size was 3.10 and the average family size was 2.27.

The village's age distribution consisted of 25.3% under the age of 18, 7.7% from 18 to 24, 19.7% from 25 to 44, 30.3% from 45 to 64, and 17.0% who were 65 years of age or older. The median age was 44.5 years. For every 100 females, there were 95.2 males. For every 100 females age 18 and over, there were 94.6 males.

The median income for a household in the village was $36,375, and the median income for a family was $51,827. Males had a median income of $45,714 versus $32,813 for females. The per capita income for the village was $29,752. About 21.9% of families and 20.8% of the population were below the poverty line, including 29.2% of those under age 18 and 9.2% of those age 65 or over.

== Education ==
Secondary education is provided by a public high school, Kansas High School. Up until 2004 the school's sports team was the Kansas Bulldogs. In 2004, however, Kansas, in union with local Oakland High School, created the Tri-County Co-op. The team name was then changed to the Tri-County Titans. With local Shiloh High School joining the co-op later, this brings us to the present situation of the sports co-op.

== Notable people ==
- John Honnold (1915–2011), former law professor at the University of Pennsylvania Law School
