= Iowa Southern Railroad =

The Iowa Southern Railroad was a shortline railroad in southern Iowa, operating a former Wabash Railroad line between Council Bluffs and Blanchard. It was abandoned except at Council Bluffs on August 22, 1988, and in August 1990 the remaining trackage was sold to the Council Bluffs and Ottumwa Railway.
