= Wabash Railroad =

American Class I railroad

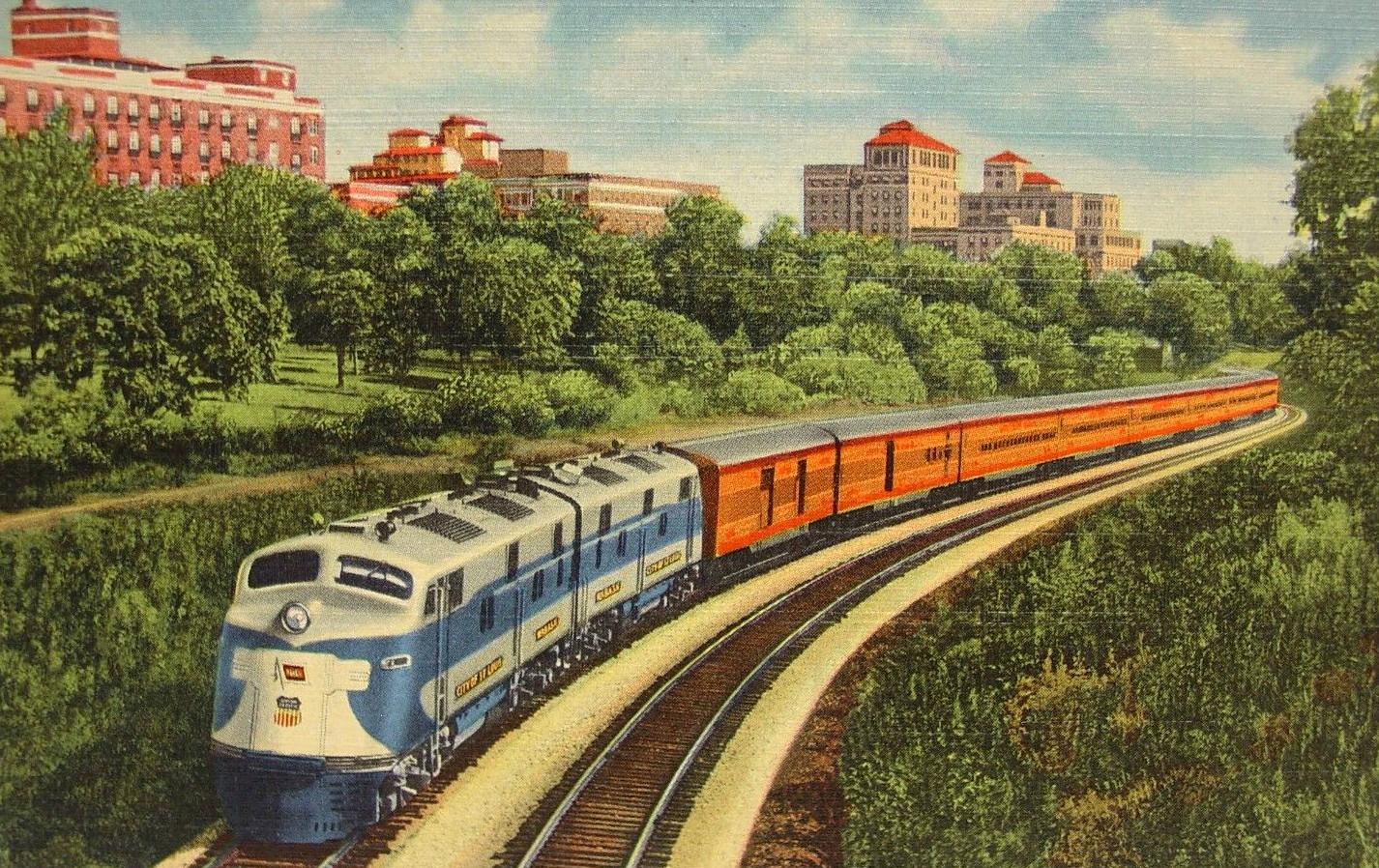
- The Wabash's City of St. Louis streamliner in the 1950s.

Overview
- Headquarters: St. Louis, Missouri
- Reporting mark: WAB
- Locale: Midwestern United States; Ontario
- Dates of operation: 1837–1964
- Successor: Norfolk and Western Railway

Technical
- Track gauge: 4 ft 8 1/2 in (1,435 mm)
- Length: 2,524 miles (4,062 kilometres)

The Wabash Railroad (reporting mark WAB) was a Class I railroad that operated in the mid-central United States. It served a large area, including track in the states of Ohio, Indiana, Illinois, Iowa, Michigan, and Missouri and the province of Ontario. Its primary connections included Chicago, Illinois; Kansas City, Missouri; Detroit, Michigan; Buffalo, New York; St. Louis, Missouri; and Toledo, Ohio.

The Wabash's major freight traffic advantage was the direct line from Kansas City to Detroit, without going through St. Louis or Chicago. Despite being merged into the Norfolk and Western Railway (N&W) in 1964, the Wabash company continued to exist on paper until the N&W merged into the Norfolk Southern Railway (NS) in 1982.

== Origin of name ==
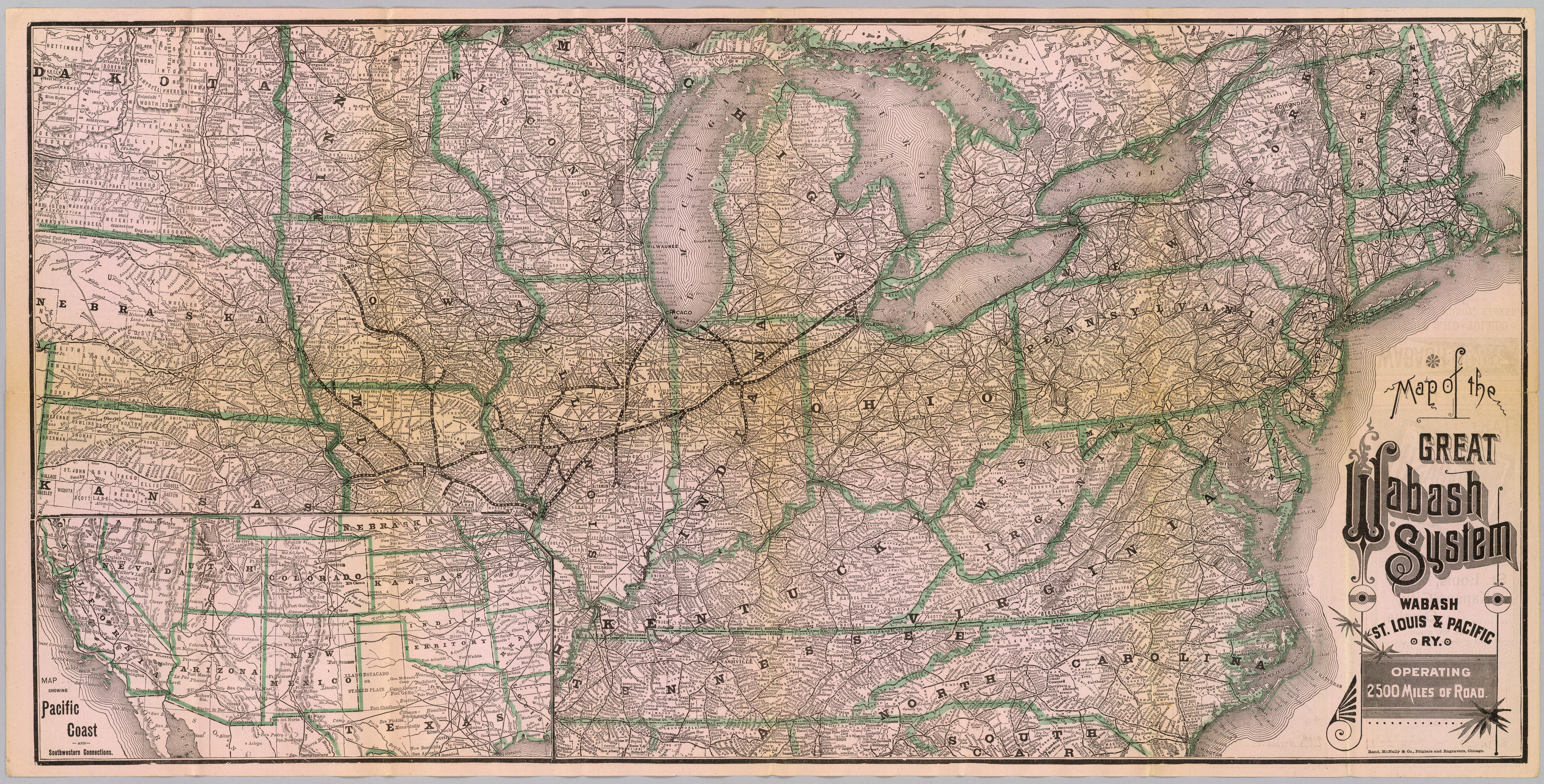
1886 system map

The source of the Wabash name was the Wabash River, a 475-mile-long (764 km) river in the eastern United States that flows southwest from northwest Ohio near Fort Recovery, across northern Indiana to Illinois, where it forms the southern portion of the Illinois–Indiana border before draining into the Ohio River, of which it is the largest northern tributary. The name Wabash is an anglicization of the French name for the river, Ouabache. French traders named the river after the native Miami tribe's word for the river.

== Corporate history ==
=== Merger tree ===
The Wabash Railroad resulted from numerous mergers or acquisitions as shown by this table:

- Norfolk Southern Railway (1982)
  - Norfolk and Western Railway (1964)
    - Wabash Railroad (1941)
      - Wabash Railway (1931)
        - Wabash Railroad (1889)
          - Wabash Pittsburgh Terminal Railway (1904–1908) later Pittsburgh and West Virginia Railway
            - Pittsburgh and Lake Erie Railroad
          - Wabash, St. Louis and Pacific Railway (1879)
            - Council Bluffs and St. Louis Railway (1877)
          - Toledo, Wabash and Western Railway
            - Great Western Railway of Illinois 1865
              - Sangamon and Morgan Railroad 1853
                - Northern Cross Railway 1847
            - Illinois and Southern Iowa Railroad 1865
            - Quincy and Toledo Railroad 1865
            - Toledo and Wabash Railway 1865
              - Wabash and Western Railroad 1858
              - Toledo and Wabash Railroad 1858
                - Toledo, Wabash and Western Railroad 1858
                  - Lake Erie, Wabash and St. Louis Railroad 1856
                  - Toledo and Illinois Railroad 1856
            - Warsaw and Peoria Railroad 1865

=== Pre-Civil War ===
The name Wabash Railroad or Wabash Railway may refer to various corporate entities formed over the years using one or the other of these two names. The first railroad to use only Wabash and no other city in its name was the Wabash Railway in January 1877 which was a rename of the Toledo, Wabash and Western Railway formed on July 1, 1865. The earliest predecessor of the Wabash System was the Northern Cross Railroad, which was the first railroad built in Illinois.

The Toledo and Illinois Railroad was chartered April 20, 1853, in Ohio to build from Toledo on Lake Erie west to the Indiana state line. The Lake Erie, Wabash and St. Louis Railroad was chartered in Indiana on August 19 to continue the line west through Wabash into Illinois towards St. Louis, Missouri, and the two companies merged August 4, 1856, to form the Toledo, Wabash and Western Railroad with a total length of 243 miles.

The company soon went bankrupt and was sold at foreclosure. The Toledo and Wabash Railroad was chartered October 7, 1858, and acquired the Ohio portion October 8. The Wabash and Western Railroad was chartered on September 27 and acquired the Indiana portion on October 5. On December 15, the two companies merged as the Toledo and Wabash Railway. That company merged with the Great Western Railway of Illinois, the Illinois and Southern Iowa Railroad, the Quincy and Toledo Railroad and the Warsaw and Peoria Railroad to form the final Toledo, Wabash and Western Railway.

=== Post-Civil War ===
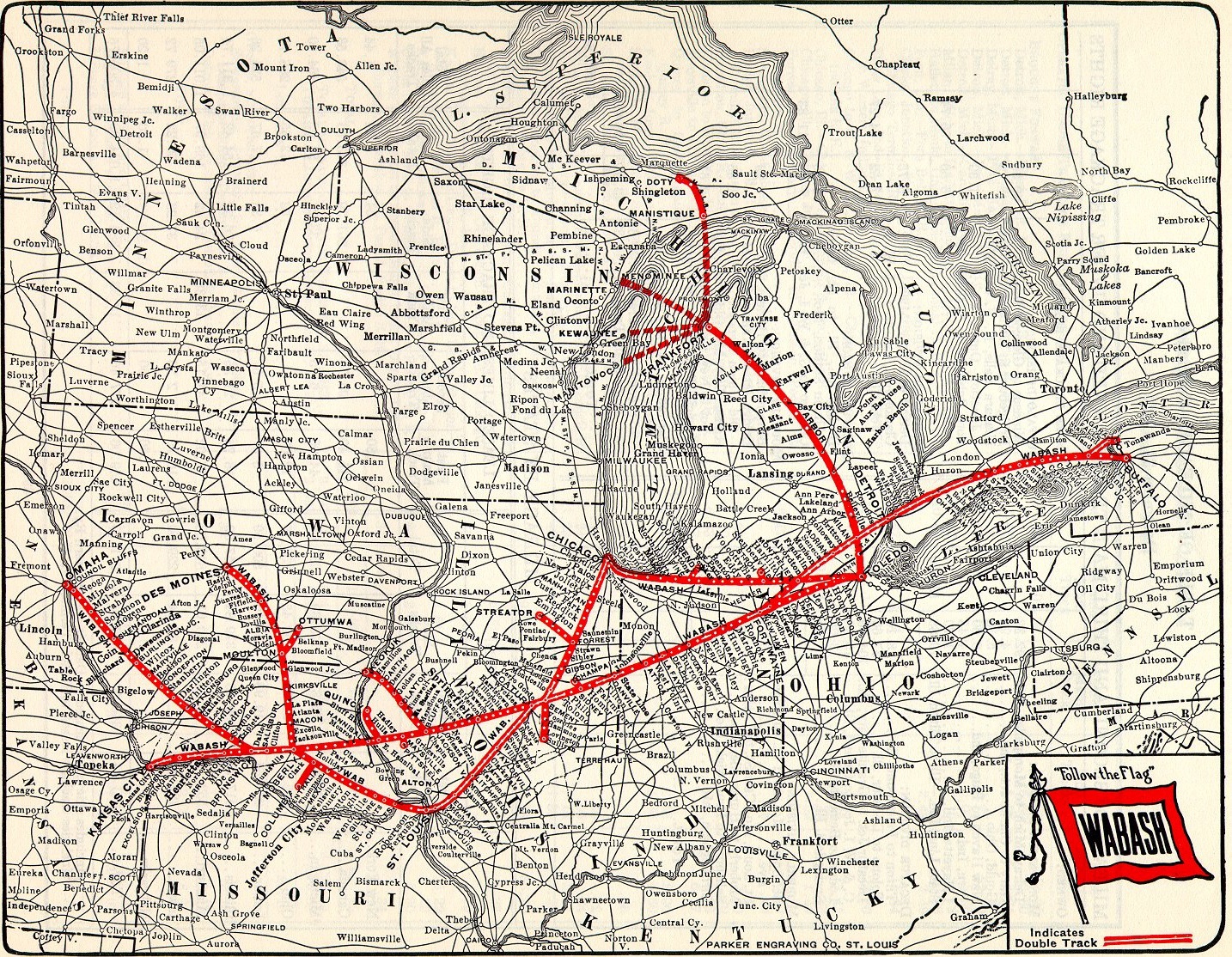
Wabash system map, early 20th century

It was this group of railroads that formed the beginning of the Wabash System with the rename in 1877.

Later mergers and reorganizations formed the Wabash, St. Louis and Pacific Railway on November 7, 1879, and Wabash Railroad on August 1, 1889. Financier John Whitfield Bunn was one of several capitalists who were instrumental in the consolidation of the Wabash System.

The first repair shops were located in Springfield, Illinois along South 9th Street. These were the primary back shops from the mid-1800s to 1905. In 1873, the former shops of the St. Louis, Kansas City and Northern (formerly the North Missouri Railroad) at Moberly, Missouri were inherited, which employed about 1,200 and built most of the system's freight and passenger cars. However, in 1902 President J. Ramsey Jr. announced that a new shop site was needed to handle the increased demand for repairs. Seventy-eight acres of land were purchased on the east side of Decatur, Illinois, which became the primary back shops until the end of steam. By the 1920s the East Decatur Shops employed 1,500 workers, with an additional 1,000 employed in the adjacent yard and offices.

=== Early 20th century ===
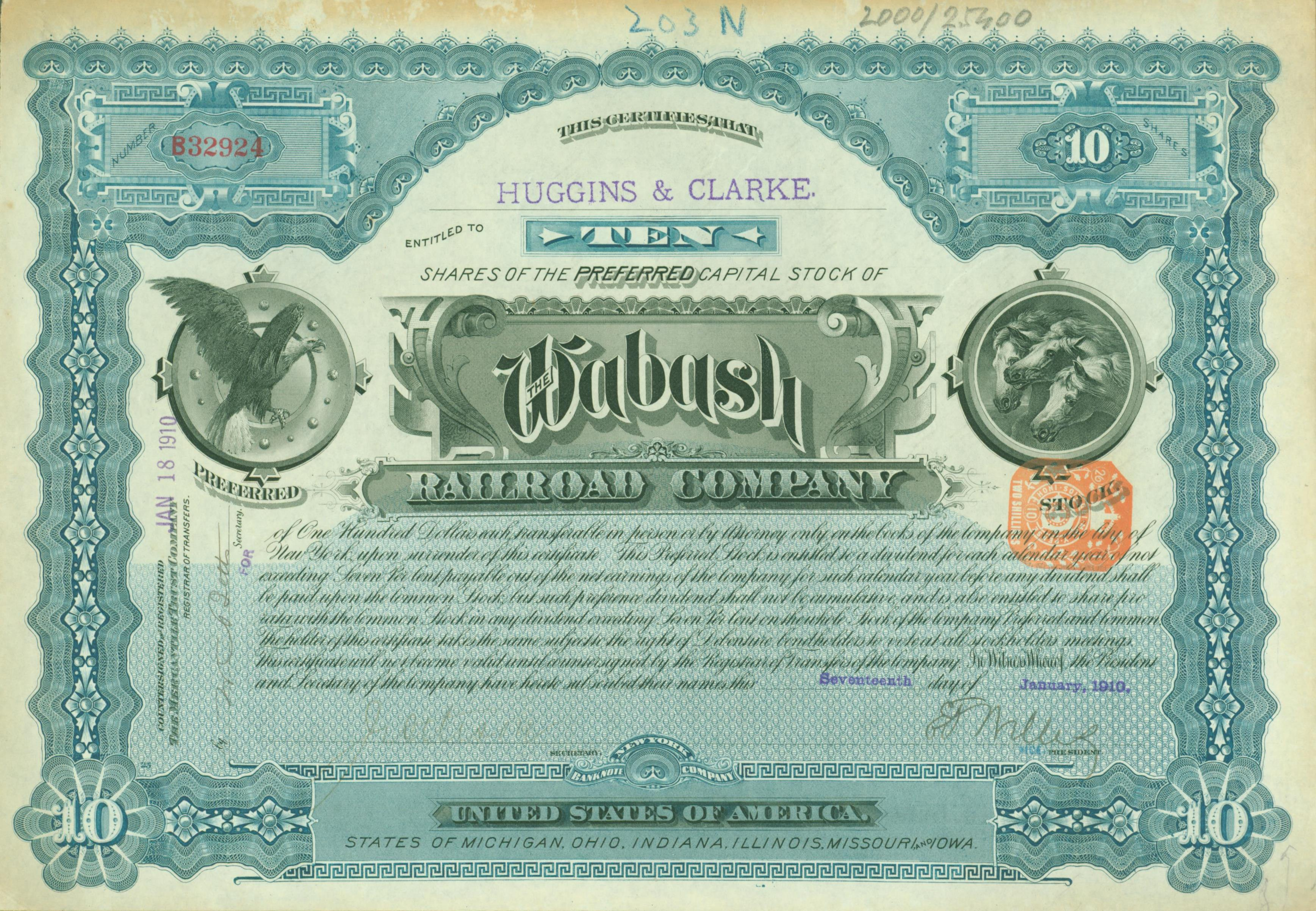
Preferred Share certificate of the Wabash Railroad Company, issued 17 January 1910

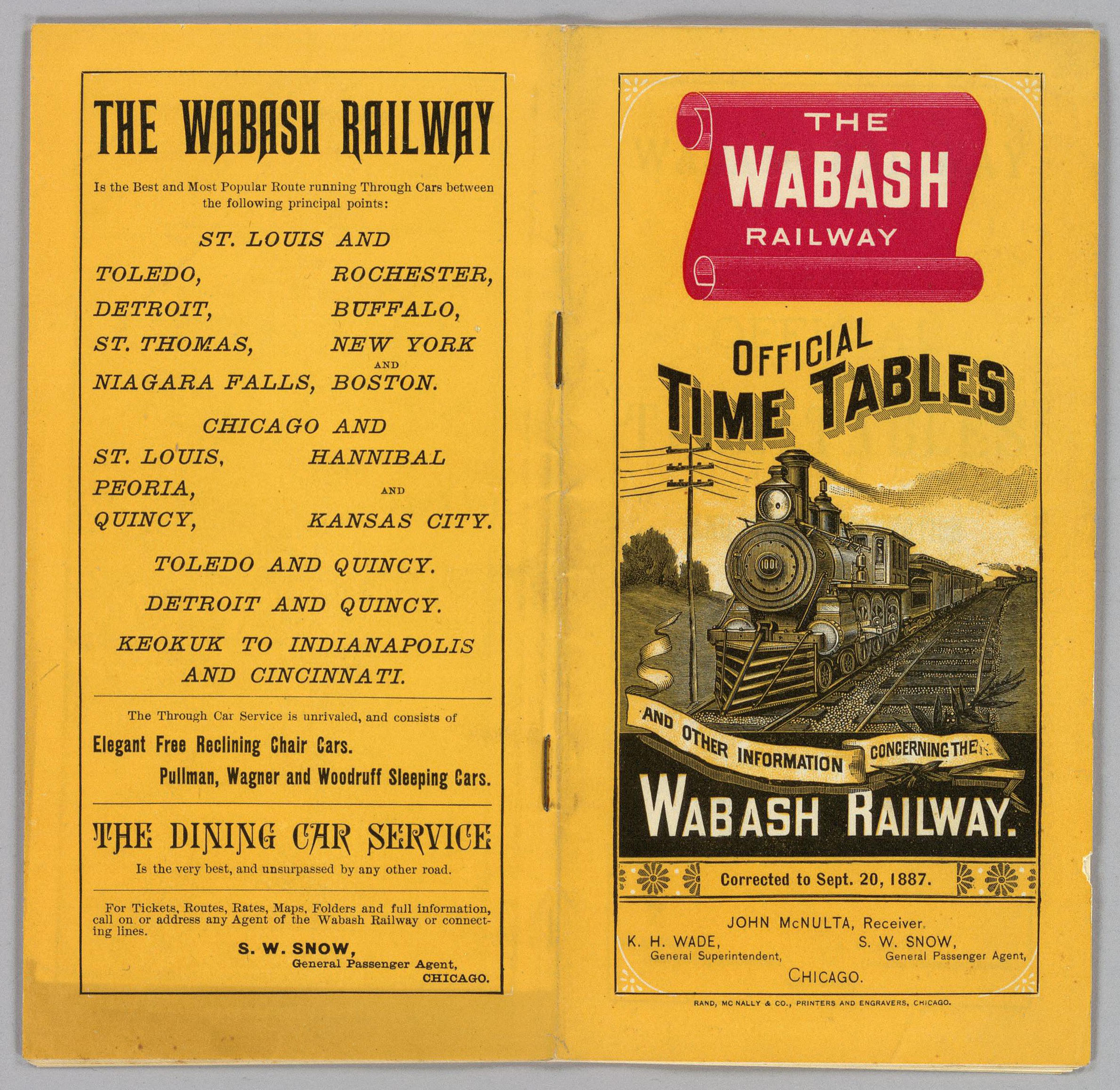
Cover of system timetable, 1887

In 1904, the Wabash Pittsburgh Terminal Railway was formed and acquired control of the Wheeling and Lake Erie Railroad, giving the Wabash access to Pittsburgh, Pennsylvania, as the final step in an attempt to break the near-monopoly of the Pennsylvania Railroad (PRR) and New York Central Railroad for traffic to the east. However, the Wabash had overextended itself, and the WPT went bankrupt in 1908; it would later become part of the Pittsburgh and West Virginia Railway. The Wabash Railroad itself was sold at foreclosure July 21, 1915, and reorganized October 22 as the Wabash Railway.

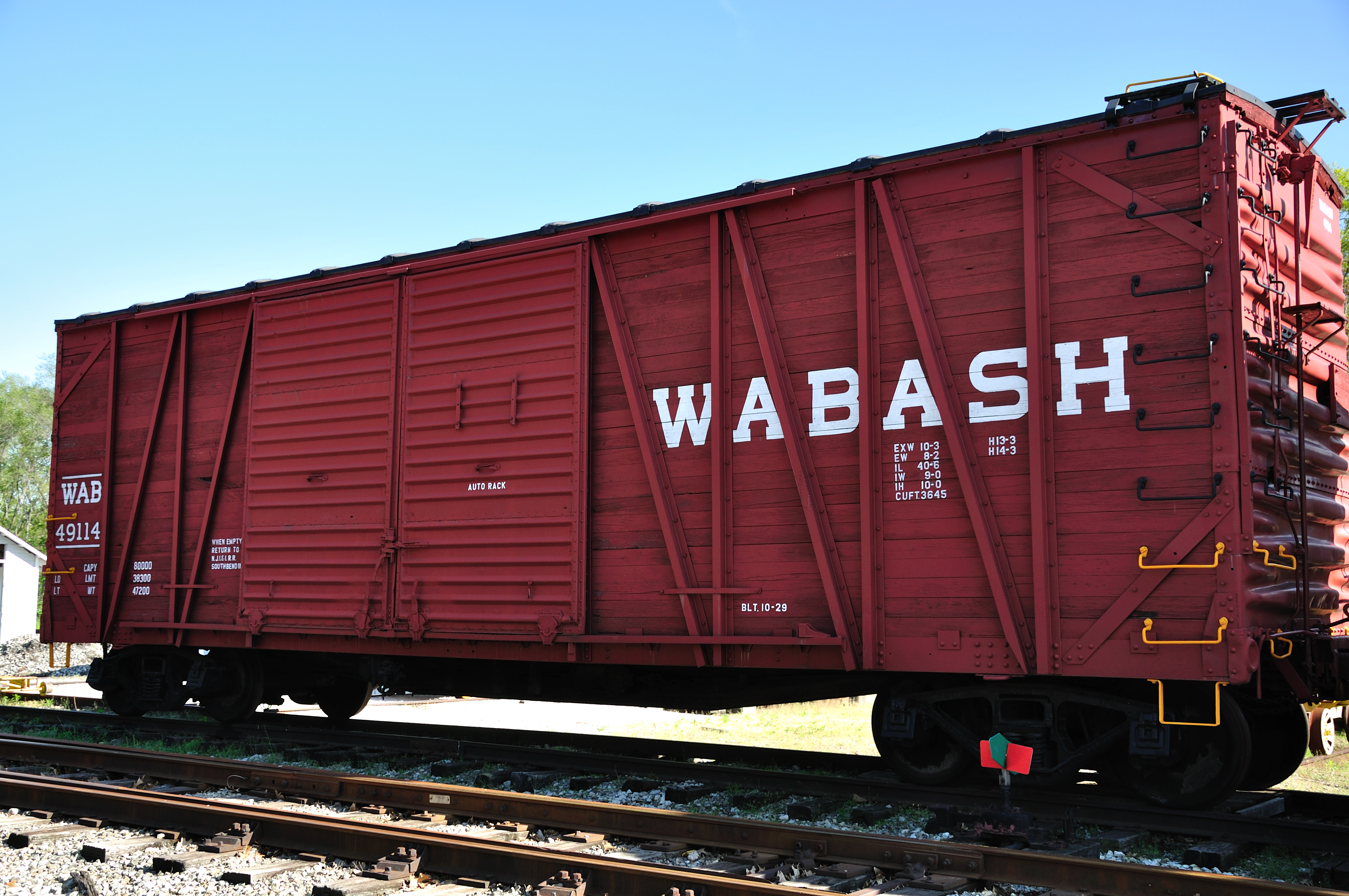
This wooden box car, owned by the Wabash Railroad, was built in the 1920s and assigned to the Studebaker plant in South Bend, Indiana.

The Pennsylvania Railroad acquired loose control of the Wabash in 1927 by buying stock through its Pennsylvania Company. In 1929 the Interstate Commerce Commission charged the PRR with violating the Clayton Antitrust Act. The ruling was appealed, and in 1933 the U.S. Court of Appeals for the Third Circuit ruled that the control was for investment only and did not violate the act.

The Wabash Railway again entered receivership on December 1, 1931. The Wabash Railroad, controlled by the PRR, was organized in July 1941 and bought the Wabash Railway on December 1.

=== Late 20th century ===
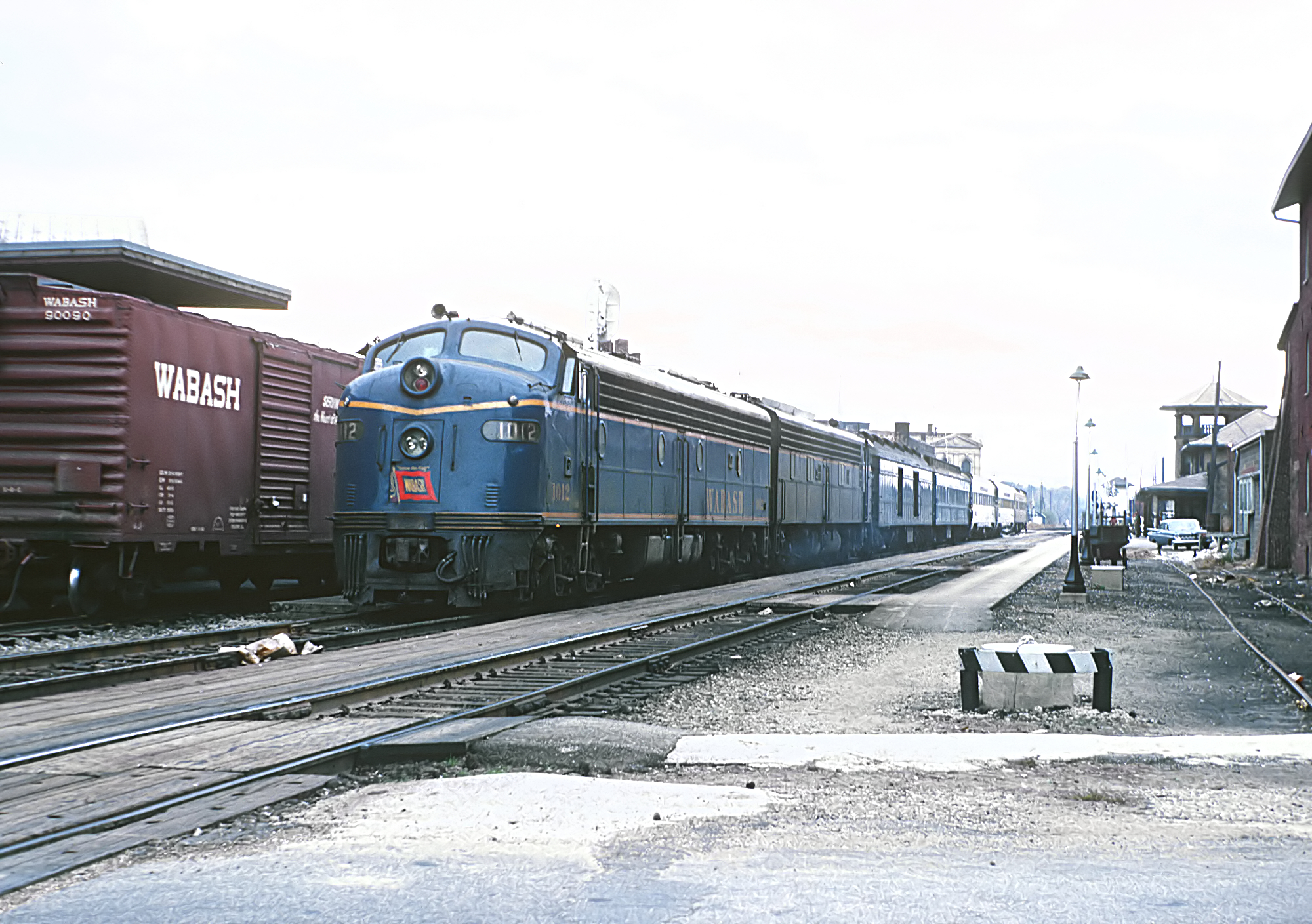
The Wabash Cannonball at the Danville, Illinois, station on October 28, 1962

In fall of 1960, the PRR agreed to a lease of the Wabash by the Norfolk and Western Railway.

The PRR's Detroit, Toledo and Ironton Railroad assumed control of the Wabash's Ann Arbor Railroad on December 31, 1962. On October 16, 1964, the New York, Chicago and St. Louis Railroad (Nickel Plate Road) merged into the Norfolk and Western Railway, and the N&W leased the Wabash and Pittsburgh and West Virginia Railway.

On March 31, 1970, the Pennsylvania Company exchanged its last Wabash shares for N&W common stock; that stock was later divested as a condition of the 1968 merger into Penn Central Transportation. Because it was only leased, as opposed to merged outright, the Wabash Railroad continued to trade its stock on the New York Stock Exchange.

The N&W and the Southern Railway merged in 1982, although the Wabash continued to exist on paper. NS formally merged the Wabash into the N&W in November 1991.

== Major routes ==
=== Windsor - Buffalo /Niagara Falls ===
In 1897, the Wabash leases the eastern lines of the former Great Western Railway between Windsor and Buffalo, which was amalgamated with the Grand Trunk in 1882. Charles M. Hays, president of the Grand Trunk and former president of the Wabash, secures a trackage rights agreement to give the Wabash operating rights in Canada. Its Canadian headquarters are located in St. Thomas because it is roughly equidistant between Detroit and Niagara Falls.

=== Toledo–Hannibal ===
The Toledo to Hannibal Line was constructed in 1855. The line out of the Illinois River valley from Griggsville to Baylis had the steepest ruling grade on the Wabash, almost 2%, which required helpers in steam era. After World War II, the line was relocated to ease the grade. In 1955, passenger service was discontinued, and by 1989, the line from Maumee to Liberty Center, Ohio, was abandoned. The portion from Liberty Center to the western border of Ohio is operated by the Napoleon, Defiance & Western Railroad. The abandoned section was converted for use as the south fork of the Wabash Cannonball Trail. In 2016, the ND&W removed the rails from the section of line between Liberty Center and Napoleon.

The Maumee-Montpelier, Ohio, section was abandoned by NS in 1990, and makes up the North fork of the Wabash Cannonball Trail. It is the longest rail trail in Ohio.

After the breakup of Conrail in 1998, NS connected the small remaining segment from Maumee to its Chicago Main, allowing it to access Maumee via a shorter route. This caused the abandonment of the west side of the Toledo Terminal Railroad.

=== Detroit–Chicago ===
This line covers the 3rd (Montpelier-Detroit) and 4th (Montpelier-Clarke Jct.–B&OCT+SC&S–State Line–C&WI) Districts of the Wabash.

The Wabash was part of the Union Belt of Detroit, a joint switching operation started with the Pere Marquette and later the PRR joined.

Detroit-Saint Louis passenger trains:

- Detroit Limited (Pullman)
- St. Louis Limited (Pullman) (westbound counterpart to the Detroit Limited)
- Cannon Ball

Detroit-Chicago passenger Trains:

- Detroit Arrow (joint with PRR)
- Chicago Arrow (joint with PRR) (westbound counterpart to the Detroit Arrow)

The Montpelier-Chicago line was started in the early 1890s, allowing the Wabash to give up trackage rights over the Erie (Chicago and Atlantic).

=== Chicago–St. Louis ===
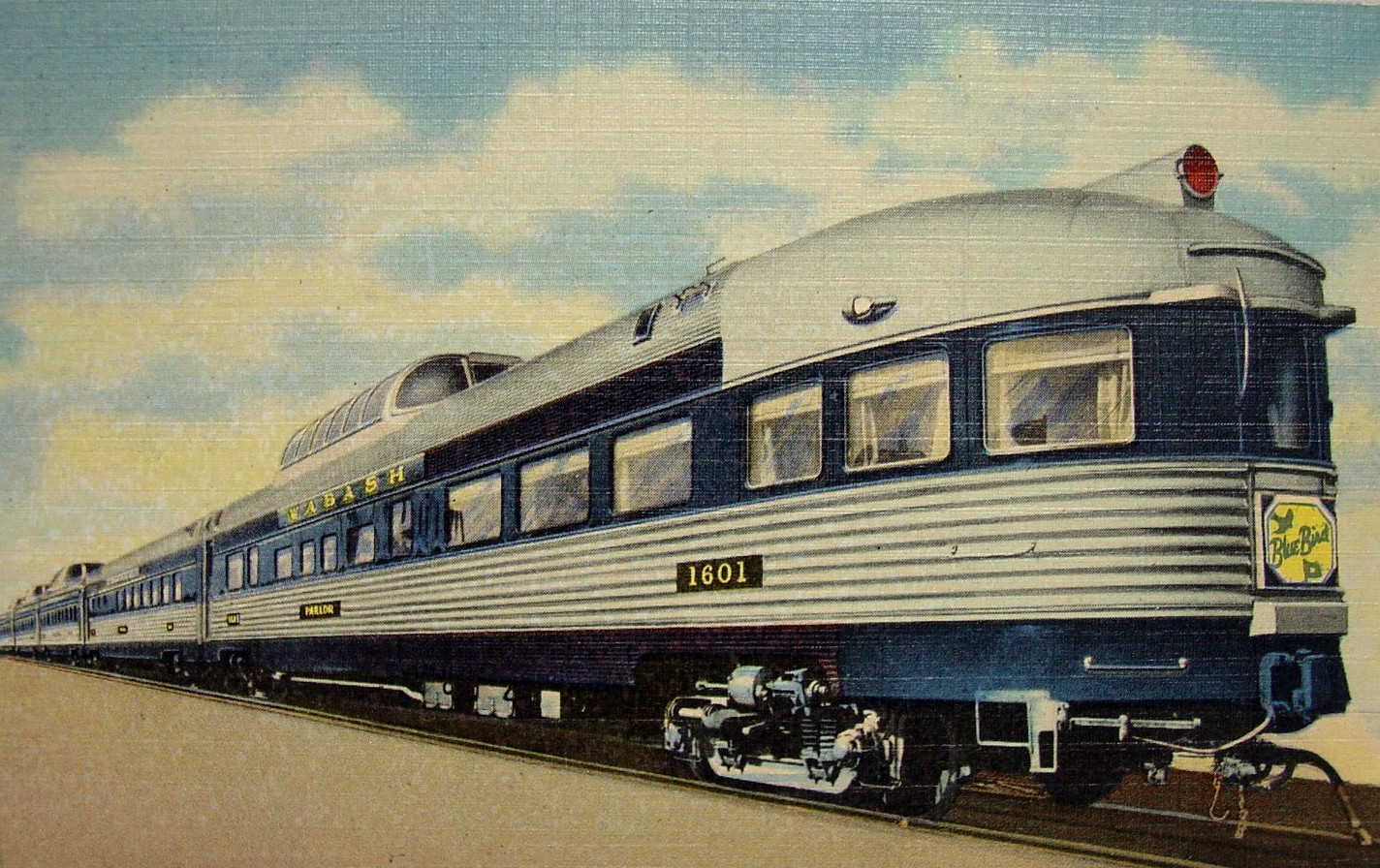
The Blue Bird's "Vista-Dome" dome parlor-observation car in the 1950s.

Completed in 1880 from Bement to Chicago, using the Chicago & Western Indiana as a terminal line. The Wabash became a joint owner of the C&WI along with founder Chicago & Eastern Illinois and other railroads. It comprises the 6th, 7th and 8th Districts of the Decatur Division. Trackage between Manhattan and Gibson City was abandoned by NS, for rights on CN (IC).

Passenger trains:

- Blue Bird
- Banner Blue
- Wabash Banner Limited

=== Council Bluffs, Iowa – Brunswick, Missouri ===
This line has the highest point on the Wabash at Dumfries, Iowa (1,242 feet (379 m) above sea level). Most of the line was abandoned by N&W in 1984. The Wabash trackage between Brunswick and Council Bluffs comprised the 18th and 19th Districts, with the dividing point being Stanberry, Missouri.

=== Iowa ===
The Iowa Southern Railroad (ISR) took over 61.5 miles of the Wabash in Iowa to the Missouri state line between Council Bluffs and Blanchard, Iowa. On August 22, 1988, the line was cut back to serve only Council Bluffs. In August 1990 the remaining Iowa Southern line in Council Bluffs was sold to the Council Bluffs & Ottumwa Railroad. In May 1991 the CBOA was sold to the Council Bluffs Railway, an OmniTrax subsidiary. Iowa Interstate Railroad purchased CBR on July 1, 2006. The 66-mile route is abandoned between Council Bluffs and Blanchard and was converted for use as the Wabash Trace Trail.

=== Missouri ===
A 93-mile portion of the Council Bluffs–St. Louis line in Missouri between Blanchard, Iowa, and Lock Springs was sold to the Northern Missouri Railroad and began operations on February 13, 1984. Operations on that line were discontinued in June 1986.

The Wabash Railroad ran their passenger trains that came into St. Louis on a 7-mile stretch of track that ran from Grand Ave (through a rail yard near Vandeventer Avenue), through University City (at Delmar Station) to a junction at Redmond Ave. in Ferguson, where the Ferguson station (now an ice cream parlor) was at North Florissant and Carson Ave., and where it met up with the current Norfolk Southern mainline. After passenger service was discontinued, trains on this stretch were reduced to one westbound symbol freight and one local per day. Norfolk Southern, who took over the line after the merger, abandoned the stretch in 1988. The Bi-State Development Agency purchased the line, which is now operated by MetroLink. MetroLink light rail trains run on the portion from north of the University of Missouri - St. Louis (UMSL) to Grand Ave, while the north portion is now the Ted Jones Trail, which runs from Florissant Road at UMSL up to Redmond Ave., where the old junction was located.

Norfolk & Western abandoned the track between Lock Springs and Chillicothe in 1983, and salvaged this portion of the line in 1985.

Thirty-seven miles of track between Chillicothe and Brunswick was sold to the Green Hills Rural Development, Inc., a Missouri economic development group organized as a non-profit corporation, in 1985. The line was leased, by order of the ICC, to the Chillicothe-Brunswick Rail Maintenance Authority (CBRM) on July 24, 1987. On April 1, 1990, the line was leased to the Wabash and Grand River Railway (WGR). The WGR's lease was terminated on December 1, 1993, due to severe flood damage on the line, and the line reverted to CBRM.

In 2003, during a dispute caused by inter-community rivalries and jealousies over industrial development along the line, the owner, Green Hills Rural Development, Inc. "sold" the railroad to the City of Chillicothe, (all real estate, rails, tools, rolling stock, and locomotives) for $32,500. Thereafter, the line was immediately appraised for $1.53 million, not including rolling stock or other tools or equipment and inventory of the short line railroad.

On December 8, 2006, the Chillicothe Constitution-Tribune reported that the city of Chillicothe sold the majority, about 30 miles (48 km), of the railroad to Seattle-based Montoff Transportation, LLC for $976,000. The part of the railroad that was sold had been embargoed since 2004. The city still owns the railroad to the city's industrial park and to a location just east of Chillicothe, where future development is planned. Today, the part of the railroad south of Norville has been abandoned and dismantled. On January 29, 2008, The Chillicothe City Press reported that the city council had voted to buy back the right of way previously sold to Montoff Transportation, paying $10 to acquire the 100' wide by 29-mile-long corridor. The stated intention was to gradually develop a trail. The report further stated that, though Montoff had the right as part of salvaging the rails to remove the bridges along the right of way, the cost to do so had been excessive. Instead, the deteriorated decks, which were sufficient for light-duty use, such as a trail, were being left.

=== Moberly–Des Moines ===
The Moberly-to-Des Moines line consisted of the 15th & 16th Districts of the Moberly Division, with the dividing point between the two districts being Moulton, Iowa. The line had a good traffic base up until the early 1970s, when traffic began to fall off precipitously. Freight traffic included coal mined in Iowa (prior to 1960), agricultural goods, farm machinery, and paper products. A change of personnel in customer service at Des Moines brought about a resurgence in business in the late 1970s and into the 1980s – so much so that NS largely re-built the line with newer, heavier steel and continuous welded rail in the mid-1980s. The Moberly-to-Des Moines line had few local industries shipping on it in the 1980s in either northern Missouri or southern Iowa, however, and served primarily as a "bridge" to get the NS to the Des Moines market.

During the early 1990s, NS began to look for ways to save on track outlays and maintenance, and a deal was hammered out with the Burlington Northern (BN) to share access to Des Moines over the old Chicago, Burlington and Quincy (CBQ) "K Line" which paralleled the Mississippi River from Hannibal, Mo. north to Burlington, Iowa. From there, haulage rights were secured to Des Moines over the BN mainline to Albia, then northward to Des Moines on the old Albia joint trackage. A portion of the line north of Moulton was saved in order to provide access to the national rail system by the Appanoose County Community Railroad (APNC).

The last carded NS train on the Moberly-Des Moines line ran in 1994. The Moberly-to-Moulton segment in Iowa was used extensively in 1993 during the Midwestern Floods of that year, as many observers noted that it was one of the few north–south through routes that were "above sea level" during the flooding. Unfortunately, this was not a factor that could have been used to save the line. Today the line's right-of-way has not been preserved, and as of 1997 the line was completely dismantled and is quickly being consumed by other land uses.

== Major freight customers 1960 ==
- Ford - Detroit, Chicago, St. Louis, Toledo, Kansas City, Buffalo
- Pillsbury Company - Springfield, Illinois
- A. E. Staley - Decatur, Illinois
- A. P. Green Firebrick - Mexico, Missouri
- Archer Daniel Midland Company - Decatur, Illinois
- Detroit Union Produce Terminal
- Lauhoff Grain Company - Danville, Illinois
- International Salt - Detroit, Michigan
- Central Stone - Huntington, Missouri
- Granite City Steel - Granite City, Illinois
- Acme Fast Freight - Detroit, Kansas City

== Passenger trains ==
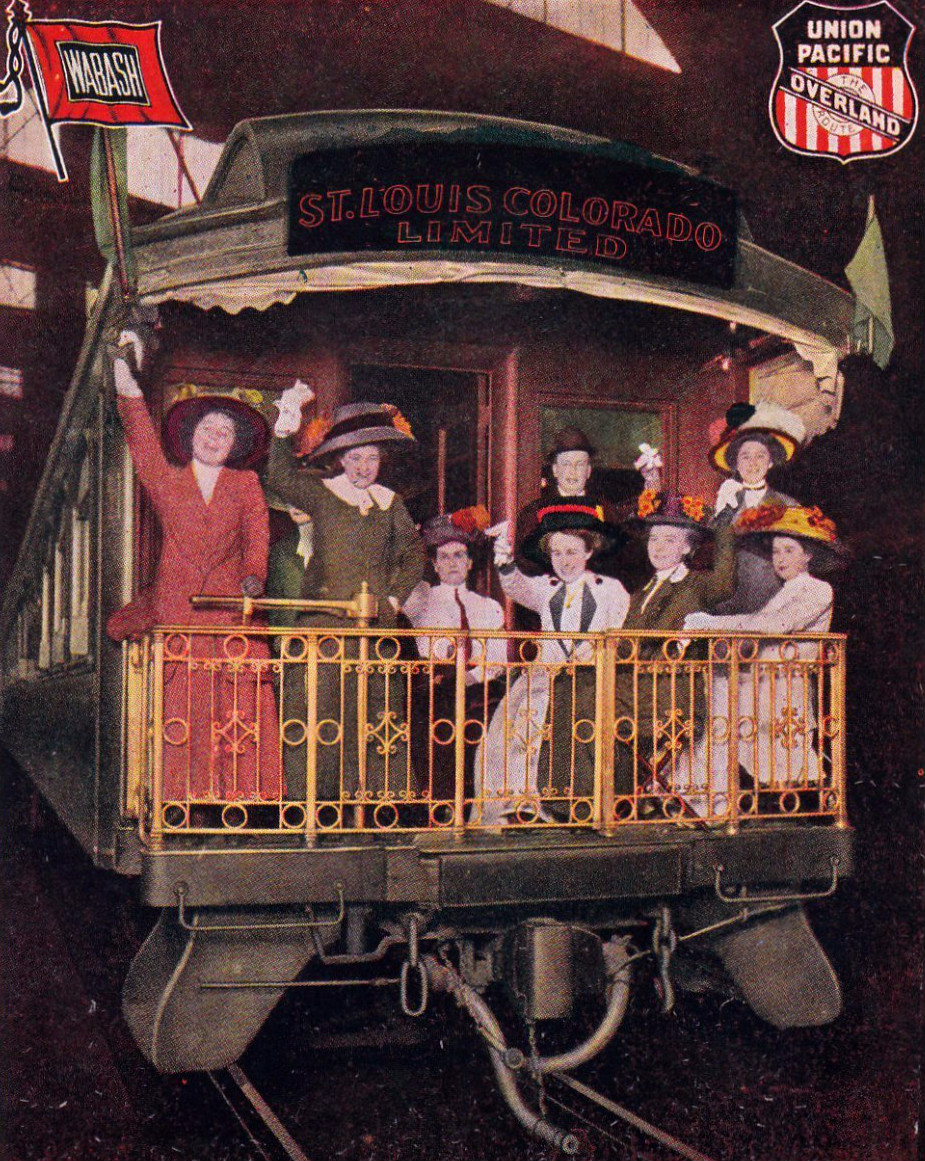
Observation car of the St. Louis-Colorado Limited.

The Wabash had a fleet of passenger trains, including several streamliners and domeliners:

- Blue Bird (train), inaugurated in 1938
- Banner Blue
- Cannon Ball
- City of Kansas City, built by ACF
- City of St. Louis (in partnership with UP)
- City of Decatur
- Des Moines Limited
- Detroit Arrow (in partnership with PRR)
- Detroit Limited
- Kansas City Express
- Midnight Limited
- Omaha Limited
- Pacific Coast Special
- Red Bird
- St. Louis-Colorado Limited (in partnership with UP)
- St. Louis Limited
- St. Louis Special
- Southland (in partnership with PRR and L&N)
- Wabash Cannon Ball

The first passenger trains to be dieselised used EMD E7 locomotives, and later ALCO PAs and EMD E8s.

=== Wabash Cannonball ===
The name of this legendary train became famous with the 1904 revision of an 1882 song about the "Great Rock Island Route." Yet the name was never borne by a real train until the Wabash Railroad christened its Detroit-St. Louis day train as the Wabash Cannon Ball in 1949. The train survived until the creation of Amtrak in 1971, when it was discontinued. On October 26 and 27, 2013, Fort Wayne Railroad Historical Society's Nickel Plate Road 765, in conjunction with the Norfolk Southern Railway's "21st Century Steam" program, pulled a 225-mile (362-km) round-trip excursion, retracing the Cannon Ball's former route between Fort Wayne and Lafayette, Indiana.

== Heritage unit ==
As a part of Norfolk Southern's 30th anniversary in 2012, the company painted 20 new locomotives into predecessor schemes. NS #1070, an EMD SD70ACe locomotive, was painted into the Wabash "Blue Bird" paint scheme.

== Rail to trail ==
Several portions of the old Wabash Railroad right-of-way have been converted to recreational use, including the Wabash Cannonball Trail in northwest Ohio, the Wabash Trail and Wauponsee Glacial Trail in Illinois and the Wabash Trace Trail in Iowa.

== See also ==
- Delmar Boulevard station
- New Jersey, Indiana and Illinois Railroad

== Notes ==
http://www.multimodalways.org/docs/railroads/companies/Wabash/Wabash%20System%20Map%2010-1907.pdf Wabash Railroad System map 1907

== Bibliography ==
- Baird, Victor (2013). Railroading on the Wabash Fourth District. Ft. Wayne, IN: Erstwhile Publications. ISBN 978-0-615-52148-0.
- Grant, Roger H. 2004. A History of the Wabash Railroad Company. Northern Illinois University Press
- Heimburger, Donald J. (1984). WABASH. River Forest, IL: Heimburger House of Publishing Company. ISBN 0-911581-02-2.
- Middleton, William D., George M. Smerk, and Roberta L. Diehl, eds. Encyclopedia of North American Railroads. (Indiana University Press, 2007). pp 1085–86
- Swartz, William. "The Wabash Railroad." Railroad History 133 (1975): 5-30.
- Lewis, Edward A. (2000). The historical guide to North American railroads – 2nd Ed. Waukesha, Wisconsin: Kalmbach Publishing. ISBN 0-89024-356-5.
- Stindt, Fred A. (1996). American Shortline Railway Guide – 5th Ed. Waukesha, Wisconsin: Kalmbach Publishing. ISBN 0-89024-290-9.
- Walker, Mike (2004). SPV's Comprehensive Railroad Atlas of North America – Prairies East and Ozarks. Upper Harbledown, Canterbury, Kent, United Kingdom: Steam Powered Publishing. ISBN 1-874745-17-X.
