= Bernard Mariette =

French businessman in sports wear industry

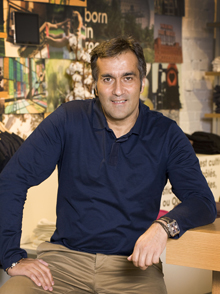
- Mariette in 2011
- Born: Bernard Mariette
- Citizenship: French
- Education: Montpellier University, University of Bradford (MBA)
- Known for: President and CEO of Canadian outdoor and sport wear retailer Coalision Inc
- Children: 3

Bernard Mariette is a French businessman who is president and CEO of Canadian outdoor and sport wear retailer Coalision Inc. Bernard was formerly the President of Quiksilver Inc, a sport-related equipment and apparel manufacturer for 15 years.

Educated at Montpellier University in France, he also holds an MBA from the University of Bradford in the UK. Married, he has three children, his youngest son was born in 2003. Passionate about all summer and winter outdoors sports, in particular hiking, Bernard climb in 2011 the Kilimanjaro.

== Work and career ==
Bernard began his career as a Financial controller at Marks & Spencer Europe then moved to l'Oréal and Timberland France & Spain as a General manager. However he spent most of his time with Quiksilver as a President, since 2009, he is the new Coalision's President & CEO.

=== Quiksilver (1994-2008) ===
Quiksilver is the world's largest manufacturer of surfwear and other boardsport-related equipment. Bernard has been credited for the strong company’s growth & success as well as the triumph of the brand Roxy. He joined Quiksilver Inc. - first as Vice-President Europe (1994-1999) then as President Europe (1999-2005). During this time sales went from 40M$ to 600M$. He became the global President of Quiksilver Inc. (based in south California) from 2001 to 2008, sales grew from 620M$ to 2.3B$. In 1994, Quiksilver had less than a handful stand-alone store, by 2007 the network counted over 600 stores.

Under Mariette’s leadership, Quiksilver also acquired DC shoes, Cleveland Golf and Skis Rossignol. Bernard Mariette would resign from Quiksilver after 15 years of service in 2008 after internal disagreement regarding the previous Rossignol acquisition.

=== Coalision (2009-Present) ===
Based in Montréal, Coalision is an outdoor apparel company.

In 2009 Bernard was made President & CEO and became along with his fund Pelican a shareholder of Coalision in order to pursue the international and retail development. Among Pelican the board of directors of Coalision count Kilmer Capital, as well as the founders remain as minority stockholders.

== Investment ==
Pelican investment funds LP is a Canadian private equity fund controlled by Bernard Mariette. Founded in 2011 the fund is specialized and focus towards sports, lifestyle and apparels industry. It’s composed of about 20 shareholders.
