= Sanuk, Iran =

Sanuk سنوك
- Village
- Location within Iran
- Coordinates: 32°31′38″N 59°39′56″E
- Country: Iran
- Province: South Khorasan
- County: Sarbisheh
- Bakhsh: Central
- Rural District: Momenabad

Population (2006)
  - Total: 31
- Time zone: UTC+3:30 (IRST)
  - Summer (DST): UTC+4:30 (IRDT)

Sanuk (Persian: سنوك, also romanized as Sanūk, Sonowk, Sanook, Sonūk, and Sūnūk) is a village in Momenabad Rural District, in the Central District of Sarbisheh County, South Khorasan Province, Iran. At the 2006 census, its population was 31, in 9 families.
