= Kansas, Georgia =

Unincorporated community in Georgia, U.S.

Coordinates: 33°37′16″N 85°16′13″W

Kansas is an unincorporated community in Carroll County, in the U.S. state of Georgia.

== History ==
A post office called Kansas was established in 1876, and remained in operation until 1883. The community was named after Kansas Territory, a U.S. territory which existed from 1854 to 1861.
