= Kansas Lake =

Lake in the state of Minnesota, United States

- Location within Minnesota
- Location: Watonwan County, Minnesota
- Coordinates: 43°55′N 94°42′W
- Type: lake

Kansas Lake is a lake in Watonwan County, in the U.S. state of Minnesota.

Kansas Lake was not named after the state of Kansas; instead the name is a corruption of "Kensie's Lake", in honor of John Kensie, an English settler.
