= Kansas City, Oregon =

Unincorporated community in the state of Oregon, United States

Coordinates: 45.595946°N 123.147054°W

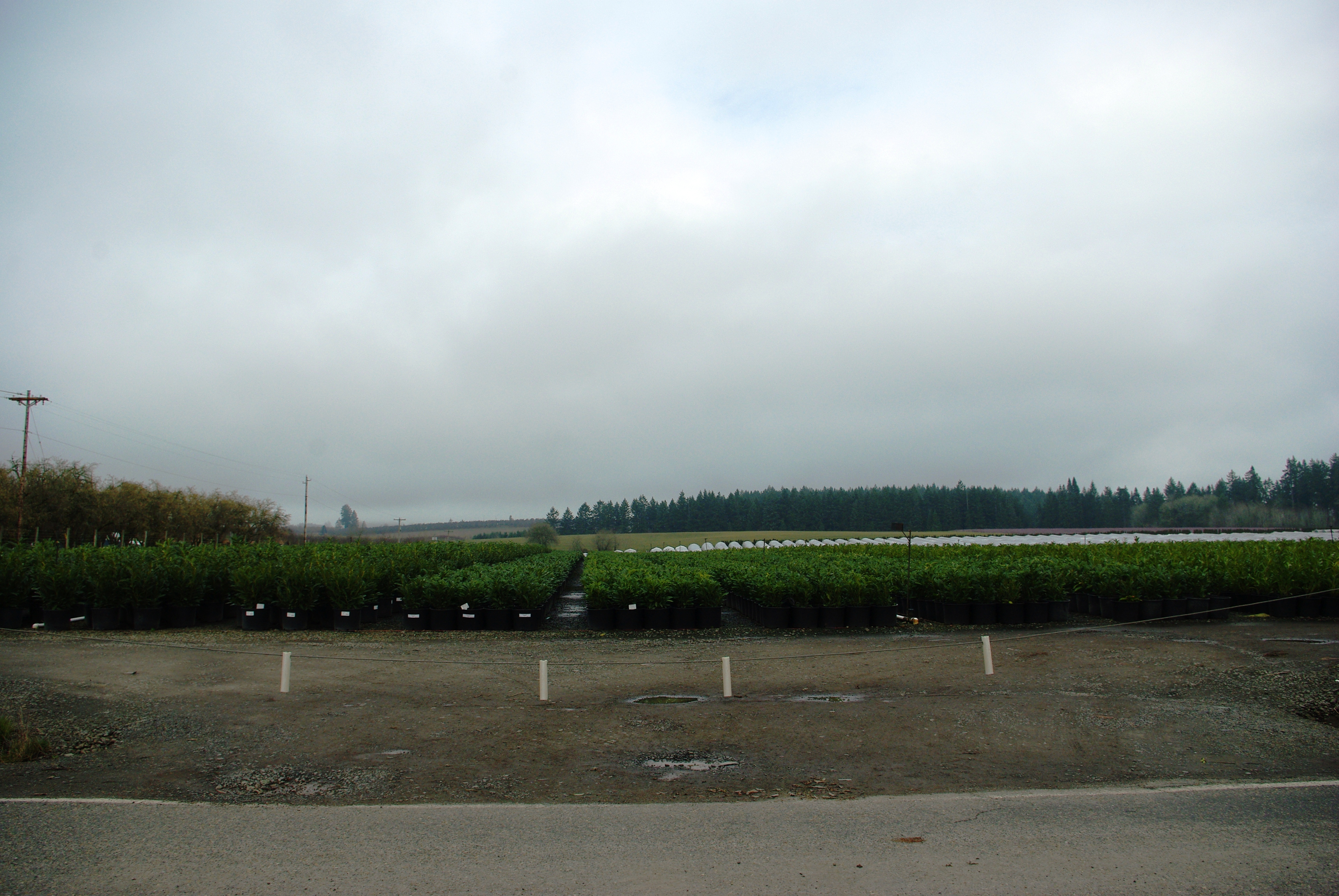
Nursery at Kansas City

Kansas City is an unincorporated community in Washington County, Oregon, United States, located approximately 28 miles (45 km) west of Portland. It is located about 6 miles north-northwest of Forest Grove.

The community was named by some people from Kansas City, Missouri who settled in the area. As of 1990, the community had a community hall and a school. According to author Ralph Friedman, these structures had been on their "last legs for ages".

The area is part of the Forest Grove Rural Fire Protection District. Kansas City is part of the Portland Metro Area.
