= Kansas City Blues =

Kansas City Blues may refer to:

== Sport ==
- Kansas City Blues (1885–1901), an early minor-league baseball team
- Kansas City Blues (American Association), a 1902–54 minor-league baseball team
- Kansas City Blues (NFL), a Kansas City-based NFL team in 1924
- Kansas City Blues (AFL), a 1934 American Football League team
- Kansas City Blues (rugby union), a Rugby Super League team founded in 1966
- Kansas City Blues (ice hockey), a minor-league hockey team

== Music ==
- Blues#Urban blues, a subgenre of blues music known as Kansas City blues
- "Jim Jackson's Kansas City Blues", a song by Blues singer Jim Jackson
