= Kansas Township, Edgar County, Illinois =

Kansas Township
- Township
- Location in Edgar County

- Edgar County's location in Illinois
- Coordinates: 39°32′46″N 87°55′39″W
- Country: United States
- State: Illinois
- County: Edgar
- Established: November 4, 1856

Area
  - Total: 40.54 sq mi (105.0 km^{2})
  - Land: 40.53 sq mi (105.0 km^{2})
  - Water: 0.01 sq mi (0.026 km^{2}) 0.02%
- Elevation: 712 ft (217 m)

Population (2020)
  - Total: 862
  - Density: 21.3/sq mi (8.21/km^{2})
- Time zone: UTC-6 (CST)
  - Summer (DST): UTC-5 (CDT)
- ZIP codes: 61933, 61944
- FIPS code: 17-045-38999

Kansas Township is one of fifteen townships in Edgar County, Illinois, USA. As of the 2020 census, its population was 862 and it contained 463 housing units.

== Geography ==
According to the 2021 census gazetteer files, Kansas Township has a total area of 40.54 square miles (105.00 km^{2}), of which 40.53 square miles (104.97 km^{2}) (or 99.98%) is land and 0.01 square miles (0.03 km^{2}) (or 0.02%) is water.

=== Cities, towns, villages ===
- Kansas

=== Extinct towns ===
- Warrington

=== Cemeteries ===
The township contains these eight cemeteries: Boyer, Cornwell, Fairview, Harmony, Pleasant Hill, Poulter, Waite and Wilhoit.

=== Major highways ===
- Illinois Route 16
- Illinois Route 49

== Demographics ==
As of the 2020 census there were 862 people, 410 households, and 229 families residing in the township. The population density was 21.26 inhabitants per square mile (8.21/km^{2}). There were 463 housing units at an average density of 11.42 per square mile (4.41/km^{2}). The racial makeup of the township was 91.18% White, 0.81% African American, 0.23% Native American, 0.23% Asian, 0.00% Pacific Islander, 0.46% from other races, and 7.08% from two or more races. Hispanic or Latino of any race were 1.39% of the population.

There were 410 households, out of which 32.20% had children under the age of 18 living with them, 39.51% were married couples living together, 13.90% had a female householder with no spouse present, and 44.15% were non-families. 36.30% of all households were made up of individuals, and 18.80% had someone living alone who was 65 years of age or older. The average household size was 2.22 and the average family size was 2.98.

The township's age distribution consisted of 24.5% under the age of 18, 6.7% from 18 to 24, 19% from 25 to 44, 32.7% from 45 to 64, and 17.1% who were 65 years of age or older. The median age was 45.0 years. For every 100 females, there were 99.8 males. For every 100 females age 18 and over, there were 98.8 males.

The median income for a household in the township was $41,429, and the median income for a family was $53,542. Males had a median income of $45,893 versus $31,750 for females. The per capita income for the township was $31,814. About 17.5% of families and 17.7% of the population were below the poverty line, including 25.6% of those under age 18 and 8.3% of those age 65 or over.

Historical population
Census	Pop.	Note	%±
2010	1,003		—
2020	862		−14.1%
U.S. Decennial Census

== Education ==
Kansas Township contains two schools: Kansas Elementary School and Kansas High School.

=== School districts ===
- Kansas Community Unit School District 3
- Shiloh Community Unit School District 1

== Political districts ==
- Illinois' 15th congressional district
- State House District 110
- State Senate District 55
