= Kcee (disambiguation) =

Kcee Or KCEE may refer to:

- Kcee (musician) (born 1979), Nigerian singer
- KCEE, an American radio station
