= City of St. Louis (train) =

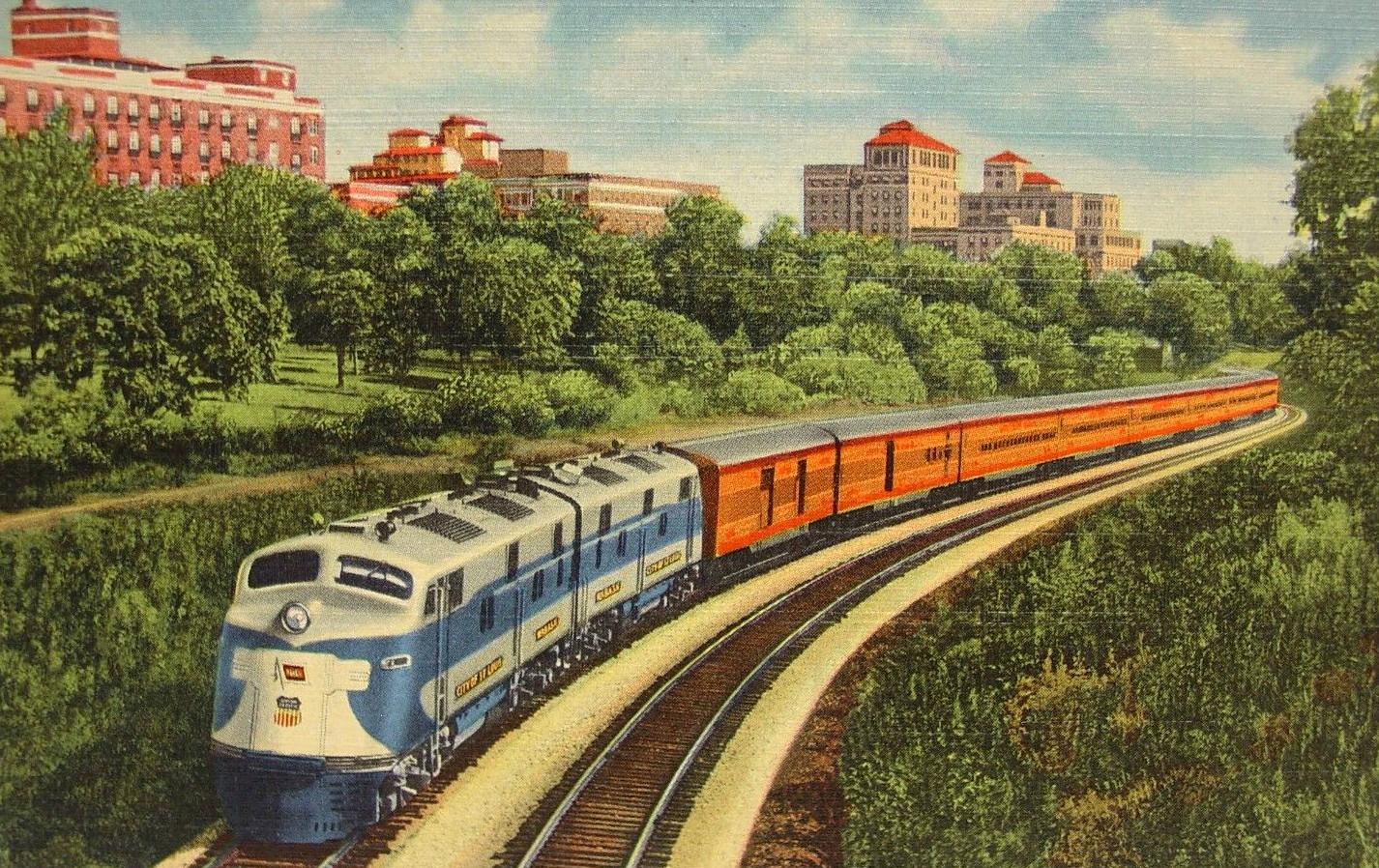
- Postcard depiction of the train headed by a Wabash diesel. The Union Pacific shield and the Wabash flag are seen on the locomotive's nose.

Overview
- Service type: Inter-city rail
- Status: Discontinued
- Locale: Western and Midwest United States
- First service: June 2, 1946
- Last service: April 30, 1971
- Former operators: Union Pacific Railroad; Wabash Railroad (later Norfolk and Western Railway)

Route
- Termini: St. Louis, Missouri (Wabash/N&W); Kansas City, Missouri (Union Pacific); Kansas City, Missouri (Wabash/N&W); Los Angeles, California (Union Pacific)
- Stops: 34
- Distance travelled: 2,328 miles (3,747 km)
- Average journey time: 46 hours 50 minutes (St. Louis – Los Angeles); 46 hours 45 minutes (Los Angeles – St. Louis)
- Service frequency: Daily
- Train numbers: 209-9-103 (St. Louis – Los Angeles); 104-10-210 (Los Angeles – St. Louis)

On-board services
- Seating arrangements: Reclining seat coaches
- Sleeping arrangements: sections, roomettes, double bedrooms
- Catering facilities: Dining car
- Observation facilities: club-lounge car

Technical
- Operating speed: 49.7 mph (St. Louis – Los Angeles); 49.8 mph (Los Angeles – St. Louis)

The City of St. Louis was a streamlined passenger train operated by the Union Pacific Railroad and the Wabash Railroad between St. Louis, Missouri, and Los Angeles, California. It operated from 1946 to 1971.

== History ==
The City of St. Louis began operating on June 2, 1946, between St. Louis, Missouri, and Cheyenne, Wyoming, where its cars were switched to other Union Pacific trains to continue west to the Pacific coast. In April 1951 it became a separate train from St. Louis to Los Angeles, California, skipping Cheyenne; it still carried some cars to switch to trains to other coast cities. In 1964 it was combined with the City of Los Angeles west of Ogden, Utah, and in 1968 with the City of San Francisco from Cheyenne to Ogden.

Between St. Louis and Kansas City, the train ran on the Wabash Railroad, then on the Norfolk & Western which leased the Wabash in 1964. This part of the run became a separate train on June 19, 1968, retaining the City of St Louis name until its discontinuance in April 1969; after June 1968 the Union Pacific train was the City of Kansas City, which lasted until Amtrak took over on May 1, 1971.

== Major stations, 1951 ==
- St. Louis
- Kansas City
- Topeka, Kansas
- Denver
- Ogden
  - Branch to Oakland/San Francisco via the Southern Pacific:
- Reno
- Sacramento
- Oakland (ferry connection to San Francisco)
  - Branch to Los Angeles:
- Salt Lake City
- San Bernardino
- Riverside
- Los Angeles
  - Branch to Portland & Seattle:
- Pocatello
- Boise
- Nampa
- Portland
- Tacoma
- Seattle

== Equipment ==
The original 1946 version of the train required three consists to protect its schedule. The consists contained a mix of heavyweight and lightweight equipment:

- Heavyweight baggage-mail (UP #5808-#5810)
- Three lightweight 48-seat coaches (UP #5331-#5365)
- Heavyweight dining car (UP #4627, UP #4629, or WAB #32)
- Heavyweight club-lounge (UP #1540, #1543, or #1544)
- Heavyweight 10-section, 1-drawing room, 1-compartment sleeping car
- Lightweight 4-compartment, 2-drawing room, 4-double bedroom sleeping car (UP Lakeside, Palos Verdes, or Verdugo)
- Lightweight 6-section, 6-roomette, 4-double bedroom sleeping car (UP American Army, American Monitor, or American Trooper)
- Heavyweight postal car (UP 2200-series)

The 10-1-1 sleeping car operated through to Portland, Oregon; cars used in this service included Balsam Fir, Douglas Fir, Inland Empire, Pinion Pine, Poudre Lake and Silver Spruce. The 6-4-4 sleeping car operated through to Los Angeles. The 2200-series postal car was added in Denver, Colorado for Cheyenne.
