= KSC Commercial Internet =

KSC Commercial Internet (KSC) was founded in 1994 as a joint venture between Internet Knowledge Service Center (IKSC) and the Communications Authority of Thailand.

KSC was the first commercial Internet service provider in Thailand. The year that followed KSC played a major role in building Thailand's internet infrastructure.

== First Internet in Thai ==
In 2008 KSC increase the ability of the company to invest as Internet Service and Business Solution Provider.
