= Sanuk (Thai culture) =

Thai cultural concept

Sanuk or sanook (สนุก, pronounced [sa.nùk]) is a Thai-language word most commonly translated as 'fun'. It is used in English to describe the Thai cultural concept that regards fun and enjoyment as "a regular and important component of everyday life". This is expressed through a wide range of activities, including numerous traditional festivals but also religious and work-related contexts.

Sanuk is not limited to pure entertainment or leisure activities. It also encompasses "the feeling of enjoyment, excitement or pleasure that one has taking part in work, play or any other activities". In the workplace, the Thai sense of sanuk contrasts with modern Western society, where work and leisure are usually kept separate. However, activities have undergone significant changes since the onset of rapid economic development and social change in the 1980s.
