= City of Kansas City =

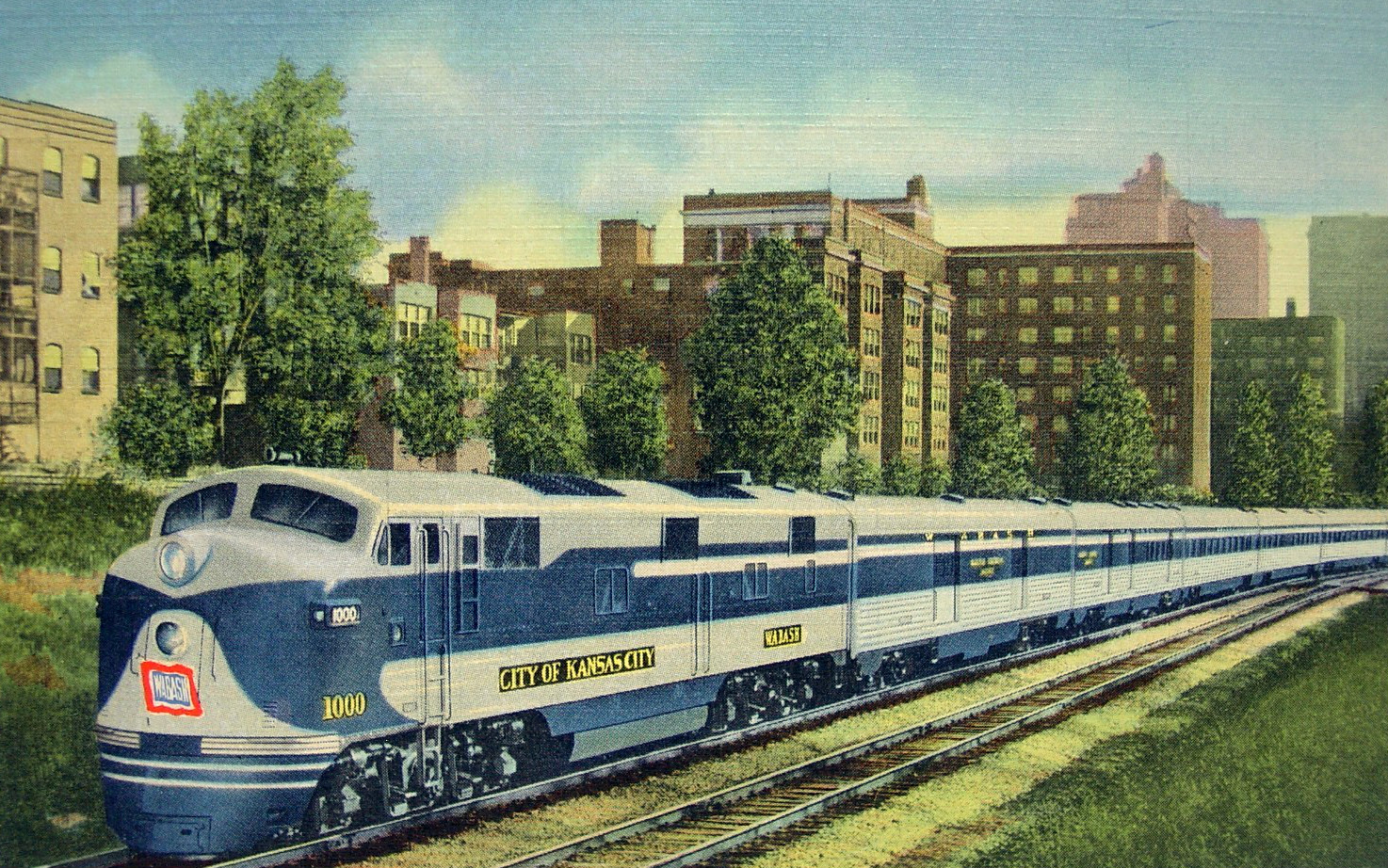
- A postcard depicts the City of Kansas City.

Overview
- Service type: Inter-city rail
- Status: Discontinued
- Locale: Midwest United States
- First service: November 26, 1947
- Last service: February 1968
- Former operator(s): Wabash Railroad

Route
- Termini: St. Louis; Kansas City, Missouri
- Distance travelled: 278.1 miles (447.6 km)
- Average journey time: 5 hours, 40 minutes
- Train number(s): Westbound: 3; east bound: 12

On-board services
- Seating arrangements: Reclining seat coaches
- Catering facilities: Dining car
- Observation facilities: Parlor-lounge car

The City of Kansas City was a streamlined passenger train operated by the Wabash Railroad and its successor the Norfolk and Western Railway between St. Louis and Kansas City, Missouri. It operated from 1947 to 1968. At the time of its introduction it was the only streamliner which operated entirely within the state of Missouri.

== History ==
The City of Kansas City commenced operating on November 26, 1947, and made a daily 278-mile (447 km) round trip schedule between St. Louis and Kansas City. At the time of its introduction it was the only streamliner which operated entirely within the state of Missouri. General Omar Bradley, a native Missourian who as a young man had worked on the Wabash, christened the new train.

Primarily a daylight train, #3 departed St. Louis at 8:45 am, and arrived in KC at 2:15 pm. The consist was then turned around and readied for the eastbound trip as #12, departing KC at 3:55 pm, and arriving in St. Louis at 9:45 pm.

The Norfolk and Western Railway leased the Wabash in 1964 but did not discontinue the City of Kansas City until February 1968.

== Equipment ==
Sample consist
- #375 baggage car; #475 baggage-mail car; #1425 coach (58 seats); #1426 coach (58 seats); #1525 lunch counter-coach; #50 dining car; #1600 parlor-observation car

The American Car and Foundry Company built the original seven-car consist in their St. Charles, Missouri plant in the suburbs of St. Louis. Cars included a baggage car, baggage-mail car, two 58-seat coaches, a lunch counter-coach, a dining car, and a parlor-observation car. The interior of the parlor-observation car was designed according to Pullman Plan #9001 and Pullman managed the car, as it did with all the Wabash parlor cars.
