= National Register of Historic Places listings in Edgar County, Illinois =

Location of Edgar County in Illinois

This is a list of the National Register of Historic Places listings in Edgar County, Illinois.

This is intended to be a complete list of the properties and districts on the National Register of Historic Places in Edgar County, Illinois, United States. Latitude and longitude coordinates are provided for many National Register properties and districts; these locations may be seen together in a map.

There are 9 properties and districts listed on the National Register in the county.

This National Park Service list is complete through NPS recent listings posted December 12, 2025.

== Current listings ==
	Name on the Register	Image	Date listed	Location	City or town	Description
1	Edgar County Courthouse	Edgar County Courthouse	June 4, 1981 (#81000221)	Main St. 39°36′42″N 87°41′44″W	Paris	
2	France Hotel	France Hotel	August 3, 1987 (#87001305)	118 E. Court St. 39°36′39″N 87°41′39″W	Paris	
3	Asher Morton Farmstead	Asher Morton Farmstead	February 29, 1996 (#96000096)	Lower Terre Haute Rd., 4.5 miles south of Paris; 39°32′22″N 87°38′39″W	Paris	
4	Henry Clay Moss House	Henry Clay Moss House	April 16, 2008 (#08000295)	414 N. Main St. 39°36′58″N 87°41′41″W	Paris	
5	Paris Carnegie Public Library	Paris Carnegie Public Library	May 9, 2002 (#02000464)	207 S. Main St. 39°36′34″N 87°41′43″W	Paris	
6	Paris Elks Lodge No. 812 Building	Paris Elks Lodge No. 812 Building	August 6, 1987 (#87001343)	111 E. Washington St. 39°36′38″N 87°41′39″W	Paris	
7	Paris High School and Gymnasium	Paris High School and Gymnasium	April 16, 2019 (#100003647)	309 S. Main St. 39°36′32″N 87°41′42″W	Paris	
8	Pine Grove Community Club	Pine Grove Community Club	March 30, 1984 (#84001071)	Junction of 1500N and 1300E north-northwest of Paris; 39°41′24″N 87°43′25″W	Paris	
9	Shaw-Van Gilder House	Shaw-Van Gilder House	March 5, 2007 (#07000116)	306 E. Crawford St. 39°36′27″N 87°41′30″W	Paris	

== See also ==
- List of National Historic Landmarks in Illinois
- National Register of Historic Places listings in Illinois
