= Miller & Yeager =

American architectural firm

Practice information
- Founders: M. H. Johnson Jr.
- Founded: 1910
- Dissolved: 1985
- Location: Terre Haute, Indiana

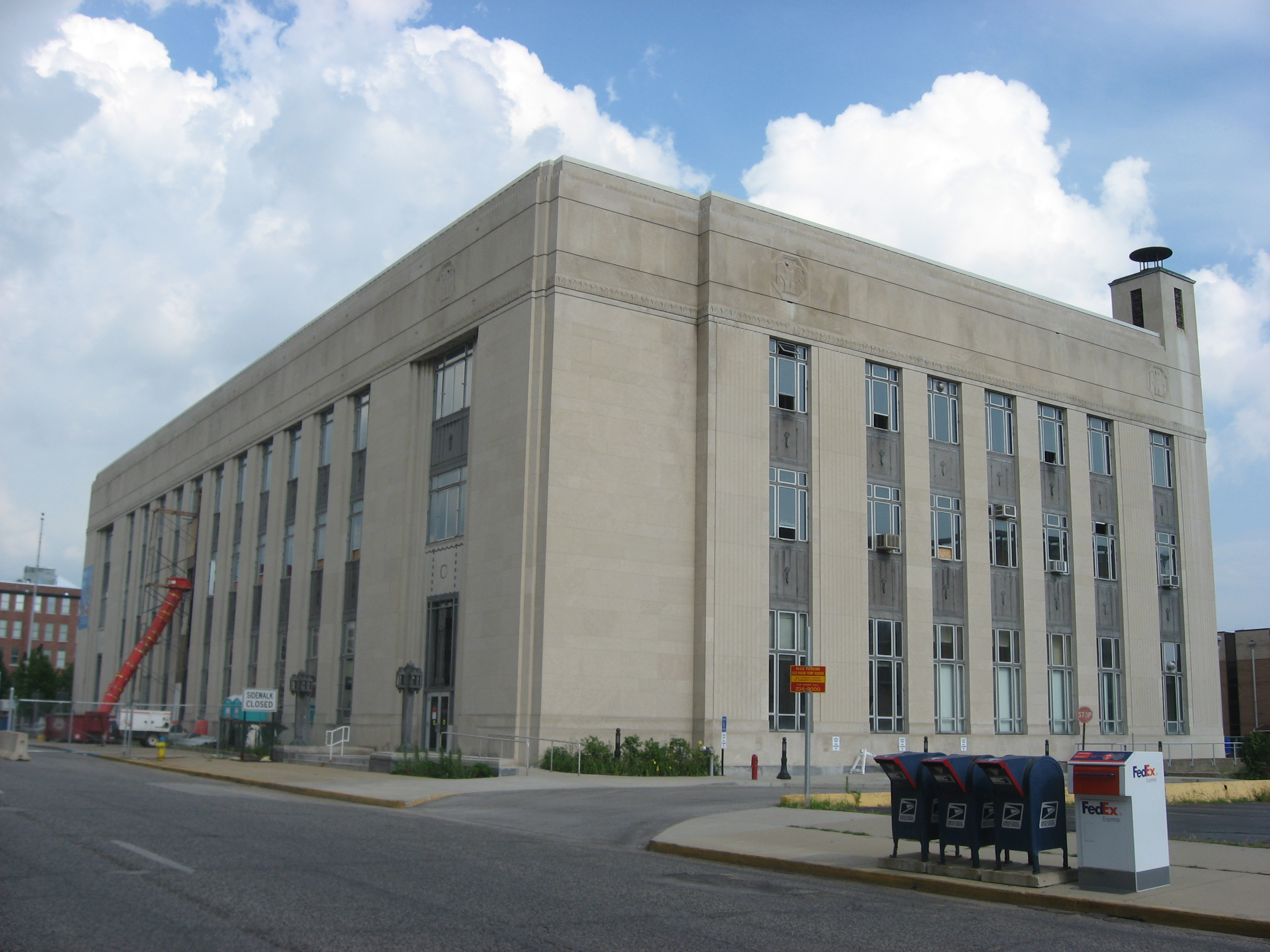
The Terre Haute Post Office and Federal Building, designed by Miller & Yeager in the PWA Moderne style and completed in 1934.

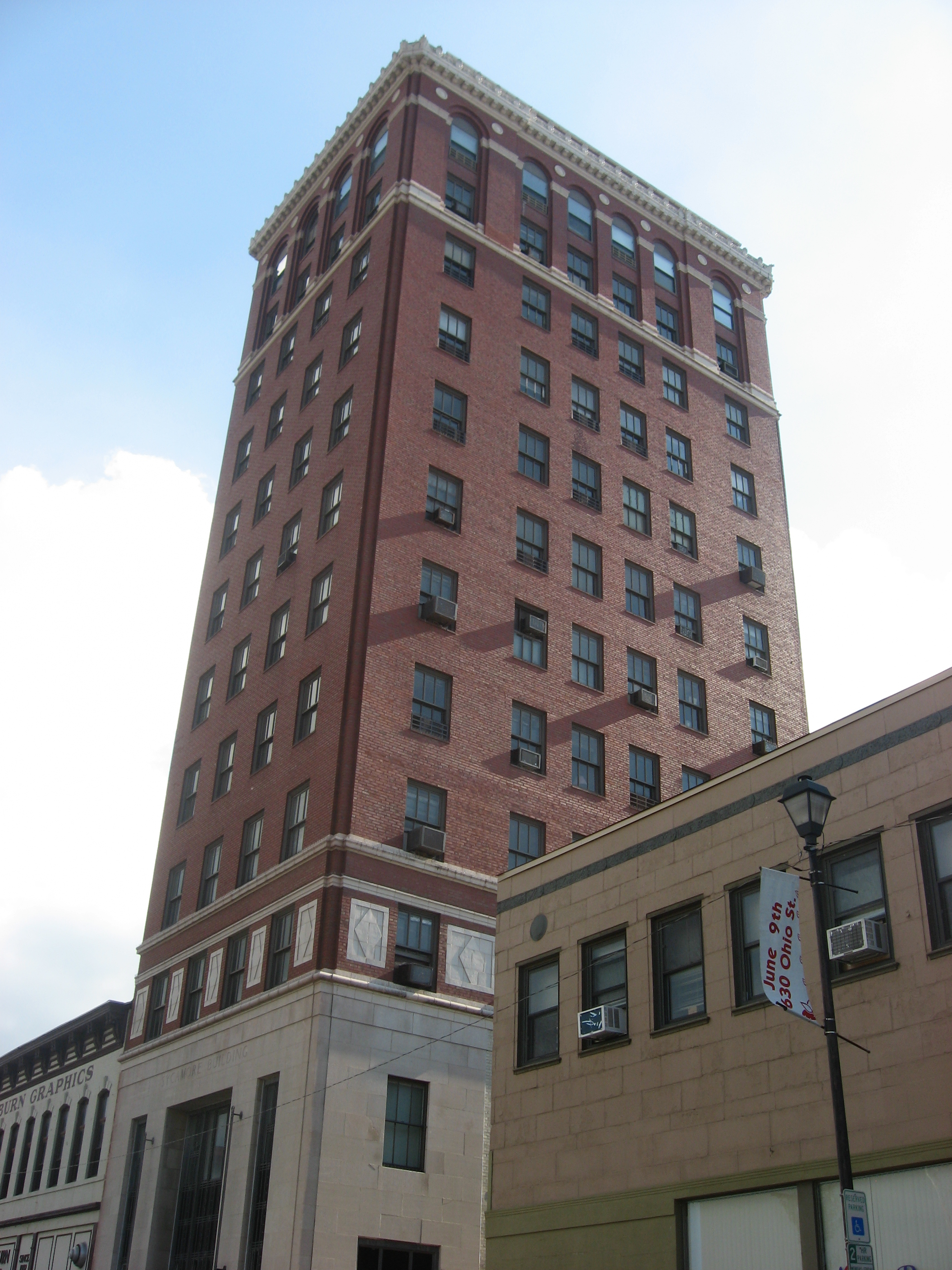
The Citizens' Trust Company Building in Terre Haute, designed by Johnson, Miller & Miller in the Colonial Revival style and completed in 1922.

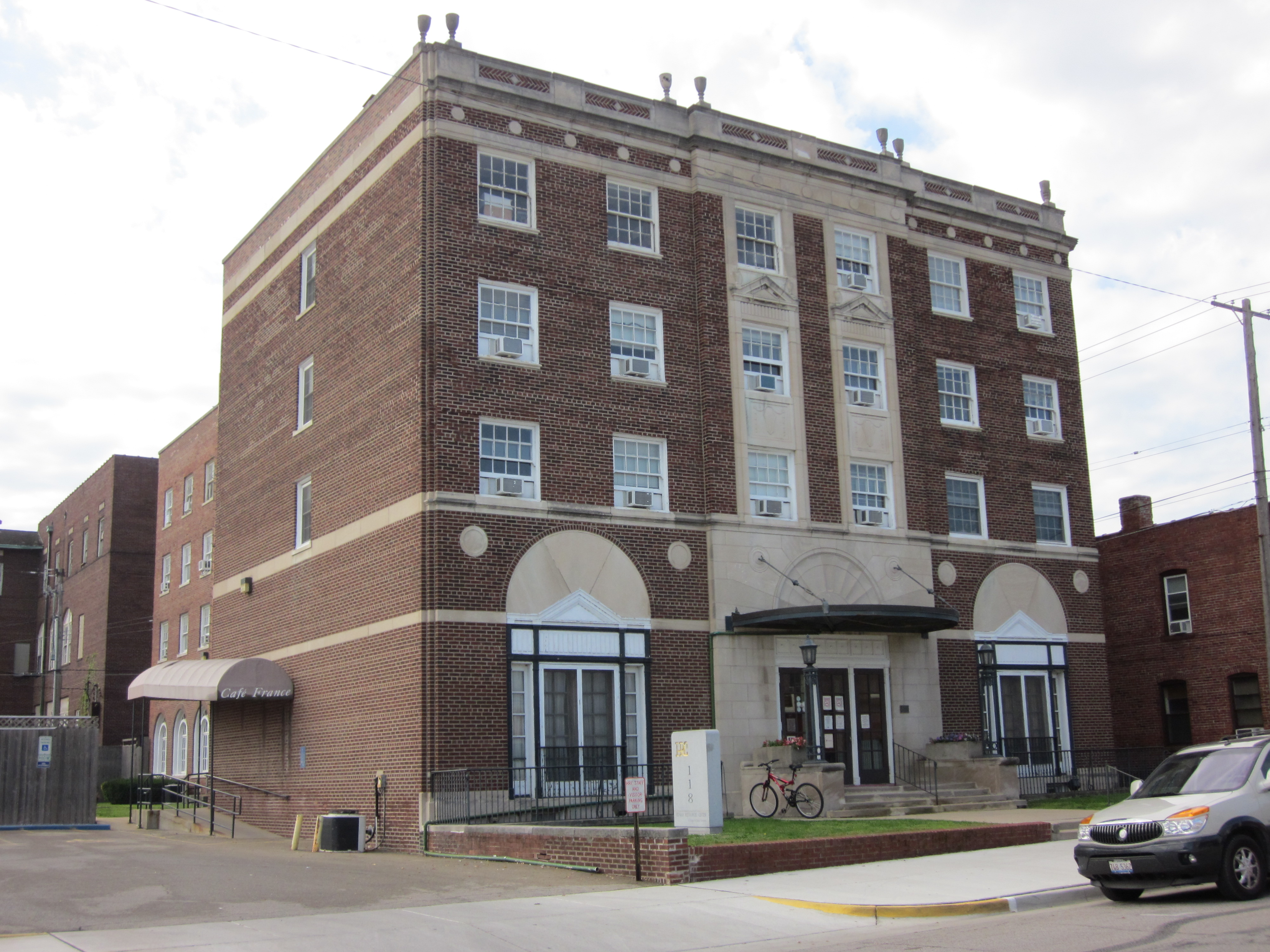
The France Hotel in Paris, Illinois, designed by Johnson, Miller & Miller in the Colonial Revival style and completed in 1924.

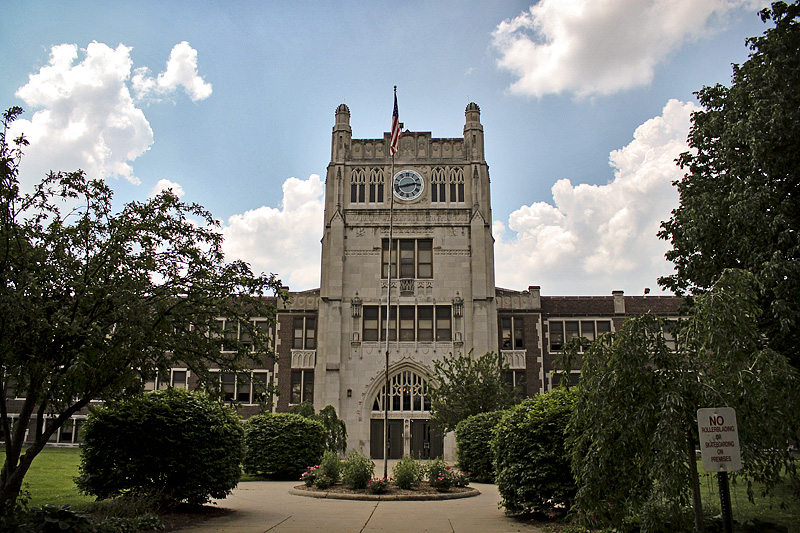
The Woodrow Wilson Middle School in Terre Haute, designed by Johnson, Miller, Miller & Yeager in the Collegiate Gothic style and completed in 1927.

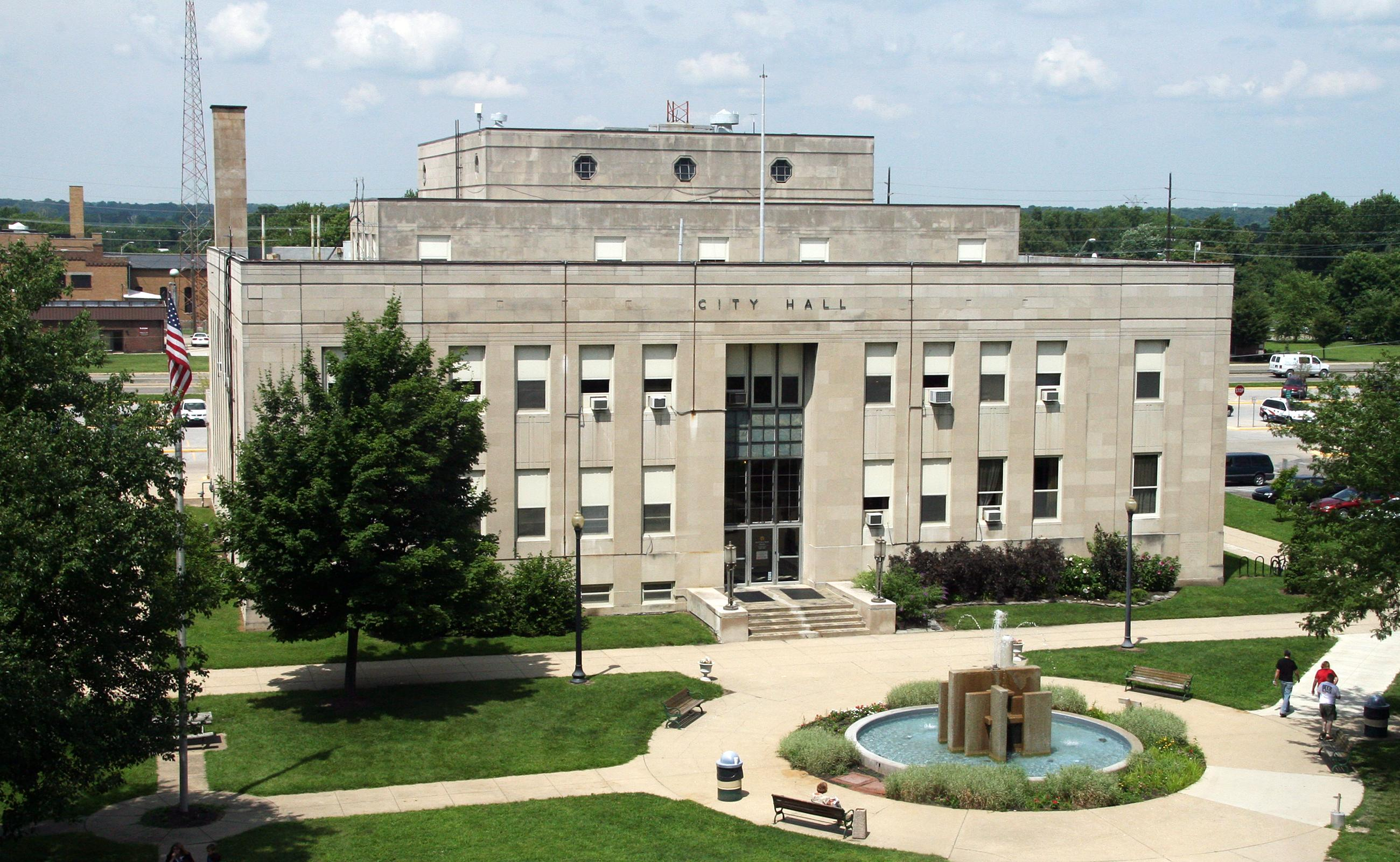
The Terre Haute City Hall, designed by Miller & Yeager in the PWA Moderne style and completed in 1937.

Miller & Yeager was an American architectural firm active in Terre Haute, Indiana. Founded in 1910 by architect M. H. Johnson Jr., it is best known for work completed under the leadership of his partner, Warren D. Miller. In 1985 its successor firm was acquired by HNTB.

== History ==
The firm best known as Miller & Yeager was founded in 1910 in Brazil, Indiana, as the independent practice of architect McMillan Houston "Mack" Johnson Jr. (1887–1923). Johnson had been born in Brazil and attended the Massachusetts Institute of Technology before joining the Chicago firm of Holabird & Roche. In 1909, while visiting his family in Brazil, Johnson contracted polio, leaving him paralyzed from the waist down. In 1911 Johnson was joined by Warren D. Miller (1887–1970), a native of nearby Terre Haute and a graduate of the University of Pennsylvania (Penn). In 1913 they formed the partnership of Johnson & Miller and established a second office in Terre Haute under Miller's management. In 1916 they consolidated their practice in Terre Haute, though Johnson continued to live in Brazil. In 1919 they were joined by Ewing H. Miller (1890–1923), Warren Miller's brother, and the firm was renamed Johnson, Miller & Miller.

Johnson and Ewing Miller both died in 1923: Miller in July, Johnson in September. In October Warren Miller formed a new partnership with Ralph O. Yeager (1892–1960), who, like himself and his late brother, was a graduate of Penn. The firm was then known as Johnson, Miller, Miller & Yeager before being shortened to Miller & Yeager in 1930. Miller and Yeager practiced together for over twenty years. In 1946 the partnership was expanded to include chief draftsman Allison L. Vrydagh, who had joined the firm as an office boy in 1921. Later that year Yeager withdrew to form the firm of Vonnegut, Wright & Yeager with two Indianapolis architects, with his former partners continuing as Miller & Vrydagh. In 1951 Miller's nephew, Ewing H. Miller II (1923–2021), and his wife, Gladys J. Miller, joined the firm as drafters and designers. Ewing Miller II had been born three months after his father's death and he and his wife, like his father and uncle, had been educated at Penn. In 1955 Ewing Miller II became a partner and the firm was renamed Miller, Vrydagh & Miller. In 1958 Gladys Miller left to open her own firm and in 1960 Vrydagh retired, with Warren and Ewing Miller continuing as Miller, Miller & Associates. In 1965 Warren Miller retired after over fifty years of practice, but continued as a consultant to the successor firm, Ewing Miller Associates.

In 1971 Miller facilitated a merger between his firm and the Bradley Partnership of Fort Wayne, forming Archonics. The goal of Archonics was to develop a network of offices in Indiana's smaller cities to better execute large projects. In 1973, when the firm was commissioned to develop a master plan for the Indiana Statehouse complex, Miller moved the Terre Haute office to Indianapolis. In the 1980s Miller invited the multidisciplinary firm HNTB, which was looking to expand its architectural practice, to acquire Archonics; the merger went through in 1985.

== Architectural works ==
Several buildings designed by the firm, listed below, have been listed on the United States National Register of Historic Places. All dates are date of completion.

=== Johnson, Miller & Miller, 1919–1923 ===
- 1922 – Citizens' Trust Company Building, Terre Haute, Indiana
  - Since its completion the tallest building in Terre Haute. NRHP-listed.
- 1923 – Newell High School, Newell, South Dakota
  - NRHP-listed.
- 1924 – France Hotel, Paris, Illinois
  - NRHP-listed.

=== Johnson, Miller, Miller & Yeager, 1923–1930 ===
- 1926 – Booker T. Washington School (addition), Terre Haute, Indiana
  - Originally built in 1914. NRHP-listed.
- 1927 – Woodrow Wilson Middle School, Terre Haute, Indiana
  - NRHP-listed.
- 1927 – Zorah Shrine Temple, Terre Haute, Indiana
- 1930 – First Church of Christ, Scientist, Terre Haute, Indiana
  - Burned in 1981.

=== Miller & Yeager, 1930–1946 ===
- 1934 – Terre Haute Post Office and Federal Building, Terre Haute, Indiana
  - NRHP-listed.
- 1937 – Terre Haute City Hall, Terre Haute, Indiana
  - NRHP-listed.
- 1939 – Terre Haute YMCA Building (former), Terre Haute, Indiana
  - NRHP-listed.
- 1940 – Tirey Hall, Indiana State University, Terre Haute, Indiana
