= Woodrow Wilson Middle School (Terre Haute, Indiana) =

- Woodrow Wilson Middle School (listed as Woodrow Wilson Junior High School)
- U.S. National Register of Historic Places
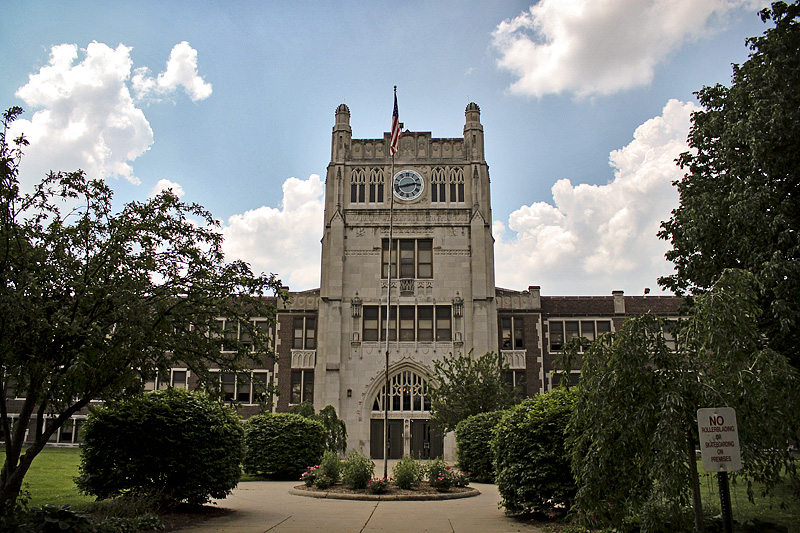
- Woodrow Wilson Middle School is located in Terre Haute in central Vigo County.

- Location within Vigo County, Indiana Location within Indiana Location within the United States
- Location: 405. 25th St., Terre Haute, Indiana, United States
- Coordinates: 39°27′50″N 87°22′48″W
- Built: 1927
- Architect: Johnson, Miller, Miller & Yeager
- Architectural style: Tudor Revival
- NRHP reference No.: 96000285
- Added to NRHP: March 25, 1996

Woodrow Wilson Middle School, formerly Woodrow Wilson Junior High School, is a historic school building located at Terre Haute, Indiana. It was built in 1927 for approximately $750,000. Designed by the firm of Johnson, Miller, Miller & Yeager. It is a three-story, "T"-plan, Tudor Revival style brick building with a central entrance tower.

The structure was listed on the National Register of Historic Places in 1996.

The interior of the school's main entrance features several large-scale murals by Gilbert Brown Wilson, completed in 1935.
