= Tirey Hall =

- Interactive map of the Tirey Hall area

General information
- Type: Student Union
- Architectural style: Collegiate Gothic
- Location: Chestnut Street; on the Quadrangle of Indiana State University
- Coordinates: 39.469079°N 87.407827°W
- Named for: Ralph N. Tirey
- Completed: 1940

Design and construction
- Architect: Miller & Yeager

Website
- library.indstate.edu/archives/exhibits/architecture/TireyHall.htm

Tirey Hall is the current home of the Terre Haute Symphony and is located at Indiana State University. Originally named the Student Union upon completion in 1940, it was renamed Tirey Hall in 1963 in honor of Ralph Noble Tirey, the fifth President of the University; his tenure ran from 1934 to 1953.

The building was a PWA funded project, to the tune of $191,782.00. The balance was funded by the university. Eleanor Roosevelt gave the dedication address and Rose Bampton, Metropolitan Soprano performed. Tirey Hall is the home of Tilson Music Hall (named in honor of Lowell Mason Tilson, Faculty and chairperson of the Music Department (1915–1940)); the Hall seat 1,450 in a classic Proscenium Arch configuration.

The building is also the site of the university's Heritage Ballroom and Lounge.

- Architect: Miller & Yeager
- Contractor: Robert E. Meyer, Terre Haute
- Initial Cost: ~$440,000
