= Gilbert Brown Wilson =

American painter

- Born: March 4, 1907; Terre Haute, Indiana
- Died: January 16, 1991 (aged 83); Frankfort, Kentucky
- Education: Indiana State University, Chicago Art Institute, Yale University
- Known for: painting, murals
- Movement: social realism

Gilbert Brown Wilson (1907–1991), best known as "Gil Wilson," was an American painter known for his large-scale murals, including his 1935 murals in Woodrow Wilson Junior High School in Terre Haute, Indiana.

Much of his later life was dedicated to depicting Herman Melville's Moby Dick. In 1955 a short film using this body of artwork won a Silver Reel Award at the Venice Film Festival.

== Early life ==
Wilson was born on March 4, 1907, in Terre Haute to parents Martha and Wilton A. Wilson, a banker. He attended McLean Junior High and graduated from Garfield High School in 1925. As an active Boy Scout, Gilbert Wilson held a fifteen-year veteran pin and achieved a Silver Eagle rank.

== Education ==
Wilson attended Indiana State Normal (now Indiana State University) and studied under professor of art William T. Turman. In 1928 he began instruction at the Chicago Art Institute, where he exhibited at the Hoosier Salon and won two awards, as wells as a two-hundred dollar prize in 1929 and 1930. Wilson was considered a poor student. He didn't take courses as outlined, and even failed to follow the venerable tradition of copying old masters, drawing miserably. Instead, he spent his time drawing prehistoric men and animals in the Field Museum, and the world's flora and fauna.

In Chicago, Wilson met mural painter Eugene Savage due to the Hoosier Prize, whom he learned the craft of murals at Yale School of Fine Arts. After three months of diligent labor, Wilson left Yale and went home. He wrote Savage that he couldn't stand that sort of artistic life; that he would much rather work and live with the master, as had been the apprentice's way for centuries before. Thus it happened that for the next ten months Wilson became part of the Savage household in Ossining, New York. During this time Wilson rendered color composition and design to rolls of architectural blueprints, did various household chores, came twice a month for the regular shopping tour to New York, and painted incidentals for the remainder of the Elks Memorial murals. This was his only canvas-oil experience except for the three still lifes of his schooldays.

Wilson became enamored with the work of prominent muralists Diego Rivera and José Orozco and travelled to Mexico to study under Rivera; there he would also study with sculptor Urbici Soler. "Great art can and must be universal—but of necessity it must have its origin in a locality... Great art must be in touch with life, must function through some means and link itself up with the common everyday experience of the people." wrote Wilson from Mexico.

== Philosophy ==
Inspired by Rivera, Orozco and Savage, as well as Terre Haute-area thinkers like social activist Eugene Debs and writers Theodore Dreiser and Max Ehrmann, much of Wilson's work concerns the plight of the common man. Common themes in his murals are war, capitalism, industrialization and ecological issues. Wilson believed that the lowest form of art is regional; the highest universal.

Wilson later recalled how seeing Orozco's work for the first time had been a revelation, saying, "From that moment on I knew it was what I wanted Art to be — a real, vital, meaningful expression, full of purpose and intention, having influence and relation to people's daily lives — a part of life. Here was the first modern art I had ever seen."

Wilson did not always find support from his community during his time in Terre Haute, particularly finding conflict with the town's affluent, who found his motifs of oppression and social change unappealing. He dealt with frustration and depression through much of his career, even destroying part of his own mural in Indiana State University's Laboratory School.

Other common themes were multicultural community and racial equality. In 1960 Wilson was artist in residence at Kentucky State College and proposed a set of murals for the gymnasium depicting black history. However, the gymnasium burned down before the murals were undertaken, and Wilson was later fired from his position there for his communist beliefs. His oil painting John Henry, from this time period, was possibly a study for these murals.

== Works ==
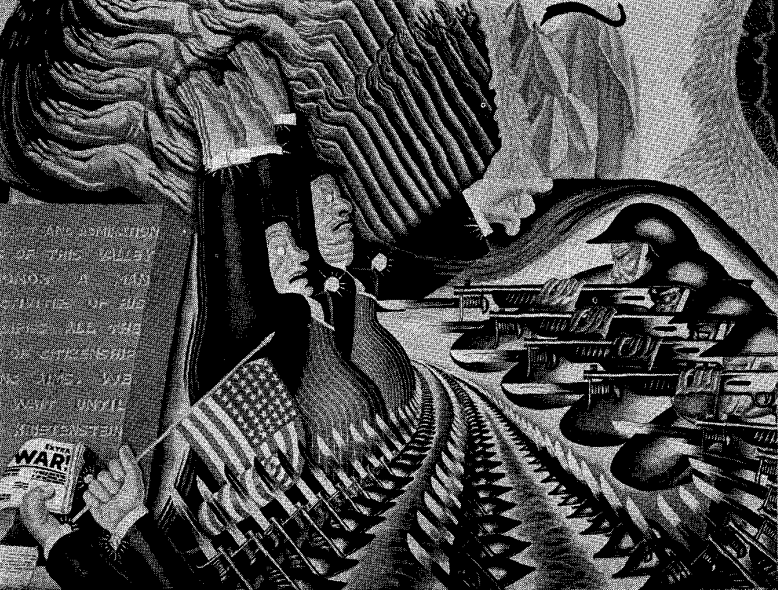
A portion of the "Machine" mural at Woodrow Wilson Middle School

Many of his murals can be found in schools and other public places including Antioch College, New York City's School of Sculpture, School of Dance (Columbus, Ohio), the Spink Wawasee Hotel, Chicago's Lincoln Park building and local community theaters in Terre Haute.

=== Woodrow Wilson Middle School murals ===
A portion of the "Liberation" mural at Woodrow Wilson Middle School

Wilson's first job upon returning to his hometown in 1933 was a set of four murals at Woodrow Wilson Middle School. Called "Liberation", these large-scale chalk murals can be found directly inside the main entrance of the building and took Wilson three years to complete, ending in 1935.

The murals, which span three walls, depict images of industrialization, capitalism, greed, agriculture, warfare and a needy populace. A portion of the mural shows four Boy Scouts of different ethnic backgrounds clasping hands with a quote showing Wilson's "respect and admiration" for scouting.

Upon completion of the murals, the school board refused to pay or reimburse Wilson for his work. His only payment was a collection of coins by the school's students that totalled $28.

Partially due to the presence of Wilson's murals, the school is now on the National Register of Historic Places.

=== Indiana State University ===
A mural in ISU's University Hall (formerly the Laboratory School) was completed by Wilson in 1936 after six weeks of work. Funded by the Works Progress Administration, themes of the work include an anti-war sentiment coupled with poor stewardship of the earth, Dust Bowl devastation and the necessity for multicultural collaboration. Wilson's own writings about the work state that the mural "is an attempt to state thru the medium of form and color the greatest problem facing civilization today. That problem is WASTE. Waste of the earth upon which we live and the waste of human life."

Wilson's creativity and local sensibility was made all the more evident when artist Bill Wolfe restored the mural in 2009 and realized that Wilson had used clay from the nearby Wabash River in some of his colors, Rembrandt chalk pastels, and was left-handed. "Originally the mural wrapped its way around and down the hallway until one afternoon Wilson was provoked by someone in maintenance," Lustig said. "In a flurry of outrage he washed away the outer walls. His father paid to have the walls repainted and brought to their original condition."

The university is home to six works by Wilson in all. One visible mural called "The Bean Pickers" (dated 1932) is in the foyer of Tilson Auditorium. Another work depicting professor Fred Donaghy was lost in 1998 when the Classroom Building where the mural was located was razed.

=== Antioch College ===
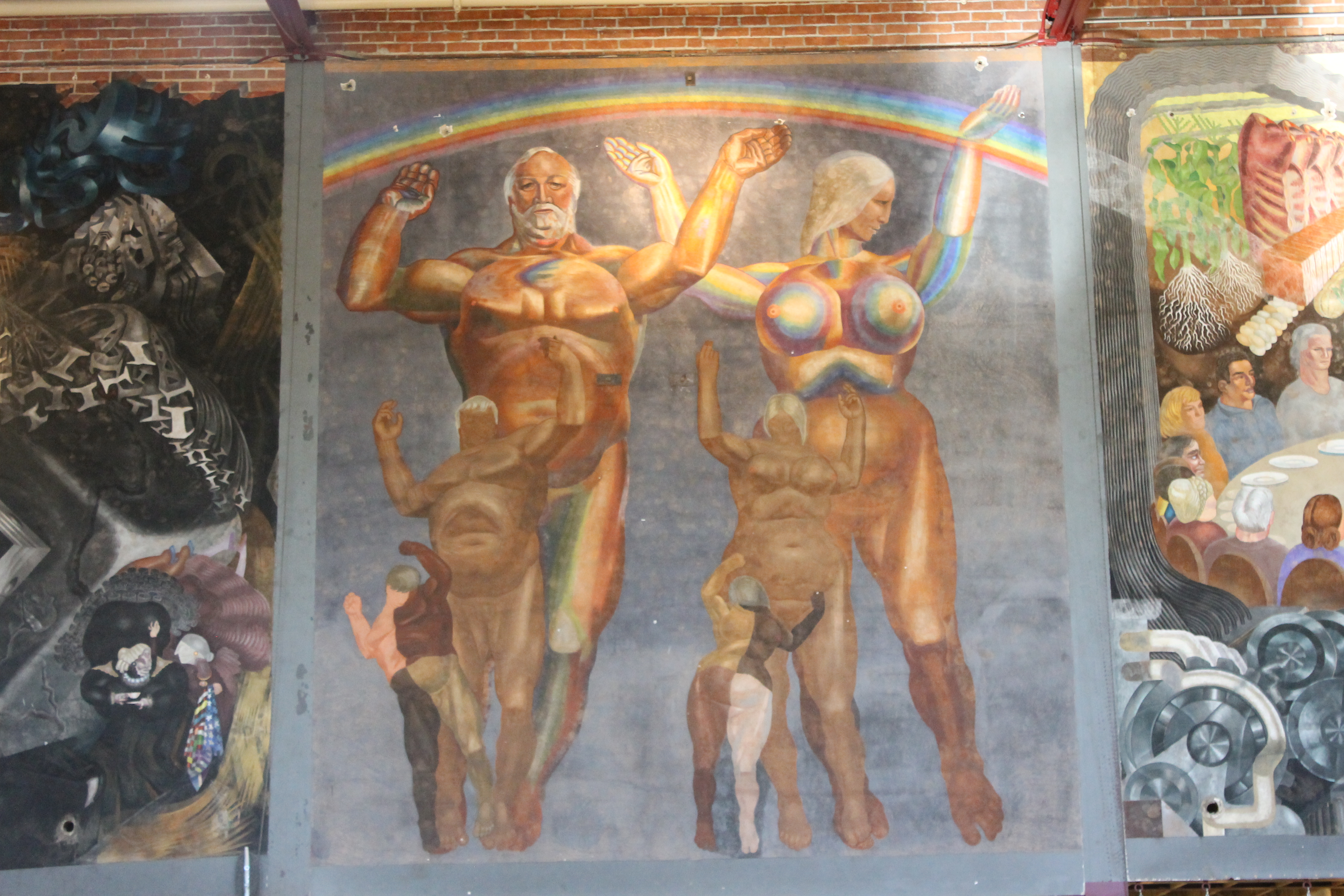
A portion of Gilbert Brown Wilson's mural in the Antioch College Wellness Center

The Curl Gymnasium of Antioch College's Wellness Center is the home of his eponymous mural, which was dedicated as a class gift by the Antioch College Class of 1938 to the school. Separated into three sections titled "Collapse," "Man Emerges," and "Order," this mural evoked themes such as racial and gender equality, the destructive spread of fascism in Europe, the collapse of modern civilization under capitalism, and the relationship between man and nature. Wilson described in the 1939 Antioch Alumni Bulletin that "in the mural, where I have sought to paint the collapse of modern civilization under capitalism, it is but a picture of what one artist feels is ahead if something is not done."

=== Moby Dick ===
After reading Herman Melville's Moby Dick in the late 1940s, Wilson created numerous artworks around the book, which he viewed as a guide for the betterment of humanity. In 1955 a short film using his artwork won a Silver Reel award at the Venice Film Festival. The next year, Wilson traveled with his Moby Dick paintings and drawings on a 27-state tour.

== Writings ==
In addition to his artwork, Wilson was a published writer. In the late 1930s, Wilson had numerous conversations about art, politics and current events with novelist Sherwood Anderson which would become the subject of his piece "A Mural Portrait of Sherwood Anderson." Wilson also published an interview with cartoonist Art Young in the summer 1938 issue of Direction Magazine, including portraits of Young both by Wilson and by José Clemente Orozco.

== Legacy ==
The definitive collection of Wilson's work was bequeathed to the Swope Art Museum in Terre Haute after Wilson's death. A 2007 exhibit Gilbert Wilson, Native Son commemorated the centennial of his birth.

Actor Walter Huston and his son, film director John Huston, were both champions of Wilson's work. The elder Huston co-sponsored (with author Pearl S. Buck) an exhibition of Wilson's work at New York City's Arthur U. Newton Galleries in May 1949. Wilson also used Walter as a model for at least one of his paintings of Ahab from Moby-Dick. John Huston called Wilson "a brilliant artist and one of America’s foremost painters."

Wilson was known to give many of his works away, which is why some of them have been found at estate sales and thrift stores.

Indiana State University professor Edward Spann wrote a full-length biography of Wilson but died before it could be published. It remained unpublished due to the wishes of his widow for more than a decade, until Wilson's family entrusted author and editor Robert K. Elder to edit and publish Unfinished and Unbroken: The Life of Artist Gilbert Wilson. In 2016, during a visit to the Swope Art Museum, Elder saw the exhibition Good Intentions: Two Unrealized Projects by Gilbert Brown Wilson. Co-curated by former director Susan Baley, and current curator Edward Trover, the exhibition displayed Wilson's Old Mister World and the Hue-Mans: A Fable of the Earth and the Atom, and panel studies for his unrealized Moby Dick mural for the library in Frankfort, Kentucky. Inspired by the exhibition, Robert K. Elder gathered images for the book Moby-Dick: Illustrated by Gilbert Wilson with publisher Hat & Beard Press.
