= Gladys J. Miller =

American architect

Gladys Jacquelyn Miller
- Born: Gladys Jacquelyn Good; December 9, 1926; Riverton, New Jersey, United States
- Died: September 1993 (aged 66); Terre Haute, Indiana, United States
- Education: University of Pennsylvania
- Occupation: Architect
- Known for: well-known Terre Haute, Indiana architect, primarily specializing in residential architecture
- Parents: Paul Good (father); Ella Mabel Good (mother)

Gladys Jacqueline Good "Hap" Miller (December 9, 1926 – September 1993) was an American architect active in Terre Haute, Indiana, from 1950 to 1979, primarily specializing in residential architecture.

== Biography ==
Gladys Jacqueline Good was born on December 9, 1926, in Riverton, New Jersey, to Paul and Ella Mabel Good. She married Ewing Harry Miller II, whose father's family was from Terre Haute, on December 18, 1948, in a ceremony at Calvary Presbyterian Church. The two met while attending the University of Pennsylvania. Miller and her husband moved to Philadelphia, Pennsylvania, where she worked as a drafter until 1951. They moved to Terre Haute in 1951, where they continued to live and raise their family. In 1979, she was diagnosed with Alzheimer's disease. In 1980, she moved with her family to Indianapolis, eventually dying from the complications of her illness in Maryland on September 3, 1993. Her remains are interred at Calvary Presbyterian Church. Her family, friends, and colleagues knew her familiarly as “Hap” or “Happy”.

== Practice ==
Miller graduated from the University of Pennsylvania in 1949 with a Bachelor of Architecture degree. In 1948 she received the Beaux-Arts Institute of Design (BAID) Award, which enabled her to travel and study in Europe before beginning her career. Upon her return, Miller worked as a drafter in the offices of Alfred Bendiner (1948–50) and Bolton, Martin & White (1950) in Philadelphia. In 1951 she moved to Terre Haute, where she became the third registered woman architect in Indiana. She began her career in Indiana working as a drafter for Miller & Vrydagh, her husband's uncle's firm, from 1951 to 1953, and then as a designer for Miller, Vrydagh & Miller from 1954 to 1957. In 1958 Miller established her own architecture firm, Gladys J. Miller Architect. She worked primarily in residential architecture, in or around Terre Haute, Indiana.

== Works ==
- Girl Scouts Headquarters, Terre Haute, IN,1973
- Dobbs Park Nature Center, Terre Haute, IN, 1975
- Dr. and Mrs. D. W. Conor, Jr. House, Terre Haute, IN, 1974
- Jerry Clegg House, Terre Haute, IN, 1958
- Indiana State University President’s House Remodel, Terre Haute, IN, 1965
- Margaret Jane Adamson House, 1035 Gilchrist Road, Terre Haute, IN, 1961
- Unitarian Universalist Society Meeting House Remodel, Terre Haute, IN, 1967
- United Daycare Center Addition and Remodel, 2051 Beech Street, Terre Haute, IN, 1976
