= Riverton, New Jersey =

Borough in Burlington County, New Jersey, US

- Borough
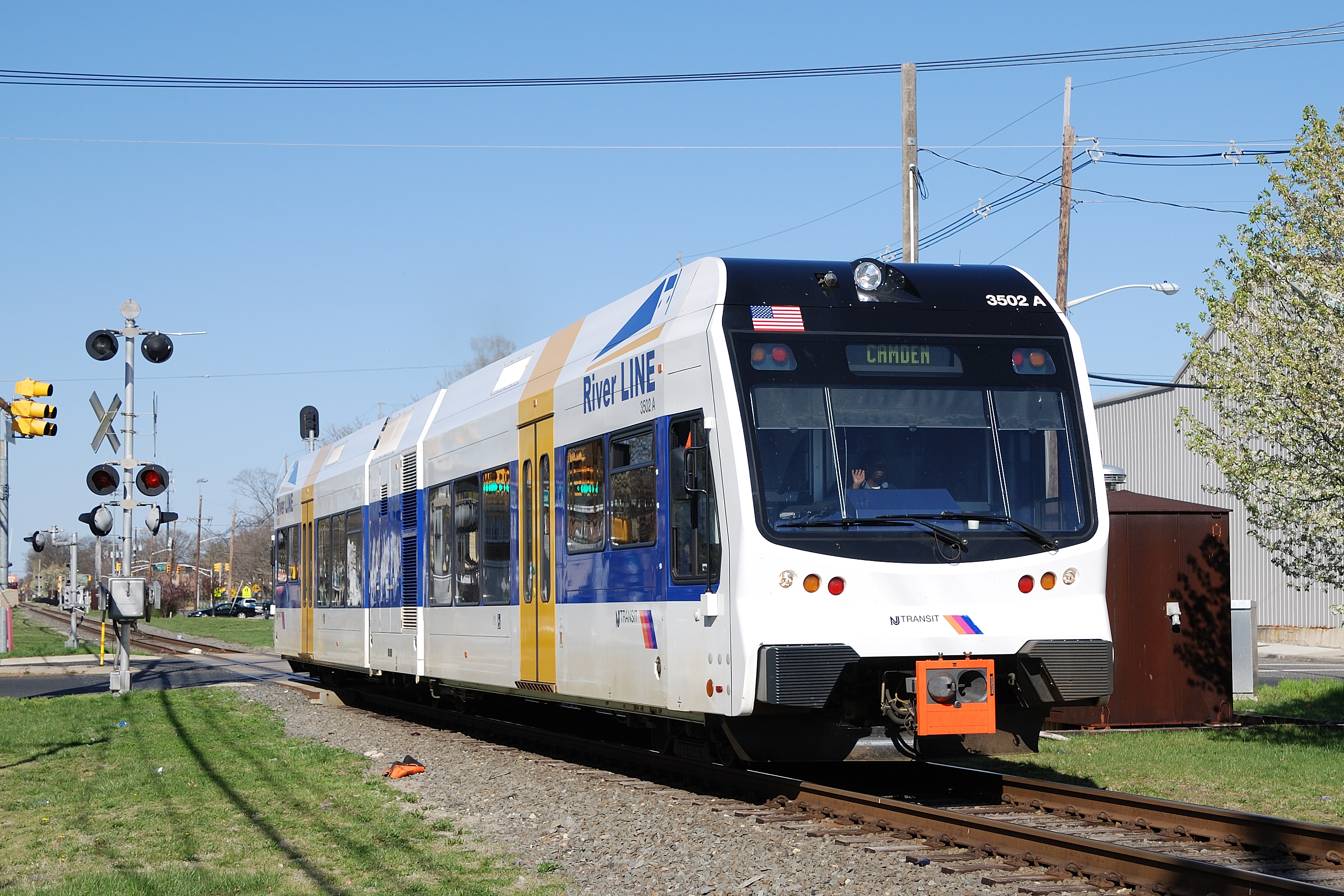
- Train on the River Line

- Seal

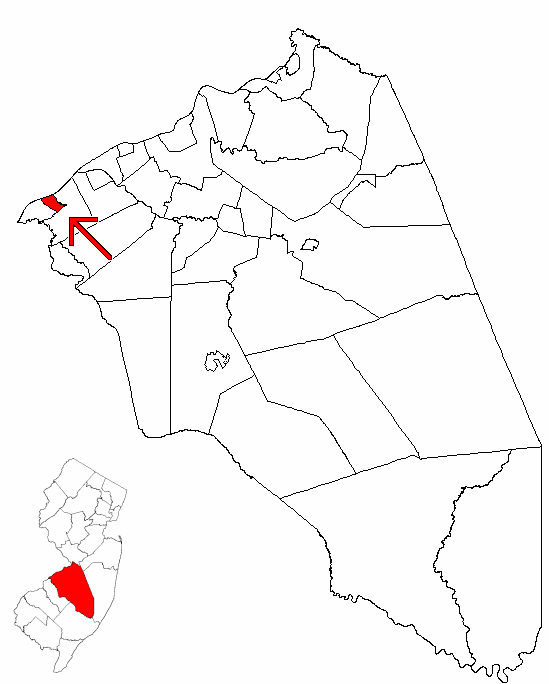
- Location of Riverton in Burlington County highlighted in red (right). Inset map: Location of Burlington County in New Jersey highlighted in red (left).

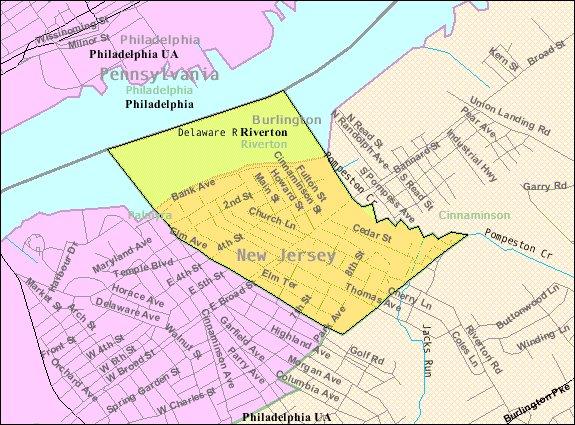
- Census Bureau map of Riverton, New Jersey

- Location in Burlington County Location in New Jersey Location in the United States
- Coordinates: 40.01194°N 75.01474°W
- Country: United States
- State: New Jersey
- County: Burlington
- Incorporated: December 18, 1893

Government
  - Type: Borough
  - Body: Borough Council
  - Mayor: James Quinn (D)
  - Municipal clerk: Michelle Hack

Area
  - Total: 0.97 sq mi (2.50 km^{2})
  - Land: 0.66 sq mi (1.71 km^{2})
  - Water: 0.30 sq mi (0.78 km^{2}) 31.46%
  - Rank: 506th of 565 in state 37th of 40 in county
- Elevation: 13 ft (4.0 m)

Population (2020)
  - Total: 2,764
  - Estimate (2023): 2,781
  - Rank: 458th of 565 in state 33rd of 40 in county
  - Density: 4,176.6/sq mi (1,612.6/km^{2})
  - Rank: 148th of 565 in state 5th of 40 in county
- Time zone: UTC−05:00 (Eastern (EST))
  - Summer (DST): UTC−04:00 (Eastern (EDT))
- ZIP Codes: 08076–08077
- Area code: 856 exchanges: 303, 786, 829
- FIPS code: 3400563660
- GNIS feature ID: 0885373
- Website: www.riverton-nj.com

Riverton is a borough located in Burlington County, in the U.S. state of New Jersey. As of the 2020 United States census, the borough's population was 2,764, a decrease of 15 (−.5%) from the 2010 census count of 2,779, which in turn reflected an increase of 20 (+0.7%) from the 2,759 counted in the 2000 census. The borough, and all of Burlington County, is a part of the Philadelphia metropolitan area.

Riverton was incorporated as a borough by an act of the New Jersey Legislature on December 18, 1893, from portions of Cinnaminson Township, based on the results of a referendum held six days earlier. Portions of the borough were taken to form Palmyra Township on April 19, 1894. The borough's name is derived from The Riverton Improvement Company, which was established after a group of ten purchased a 120-acre (49 ha) that would be the site of a planned community with homes erected for many of the founders along the riverfront.

It is a dry town, where alcohol cannot be sold legally. The borough's dry status was an early character of the borough, with a clause inserted starting in 1952 by the Riverton Improvement Company into deeds for all properties in the community that prohibited the sale or manufacture of alcoholic beverages.

The borough is located on the Delaware River and is pedestrian-friendly, with sidewalks, gas lamps, and Victorian architecture. Riverton is home to the Riverton Yacht Club, one of the oldest active yacht clubs in the country. Many residents' sailboats make their home at this landmark.

== History ==
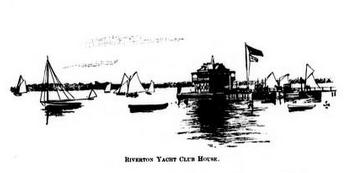
Riverton Yacht Club House c. 1894

Riverton was established in 1851, along the Delaware River, having been laid out by Philadelphia architect Samuel Sloan. According to architectural historian Henry Russell Hitchcock, Riverton was one of the first totally planned residential subdivisions in the United States.

The Japanese beetle, now a widespread invasive insect pest in the United States, were first discovered in a nursery near Riverton in 1916.

== Geography ==
According to the United States Census Bureau, the borough had a total area of 0.96 square miles (2.50 km^{2}), including 0.66 square miles (1.71 km^{2}) of land and 0.30 square miles (0.78 km^{2}) of water (31.46%).

The borough borders Cinnaminson Township and Palmyra in Burlington County; and Philadelphia, across the Delaware River in Pennsylvania.

== Demographics ==
Historical population
Census	Pop.	Note	%±
1880	582		—
1890	1,075		84.7%
1900	1,332	*	23.9%
1910	1,778		33.5%
1920	2,341		31.7%
1930	2,483		6.1%
1940	2,354		−5.2%
1950	2,761		17.3%
1960	3,324		20.4%
1970	3,412		2.6%
1980	3,068		−10.1%
1990	2,775		−9.6%
2000	2,759		−0.6%
2010	2,779		0.7%
2020	2,764		−0.5%
2023 (est.)	2,781	▲	0.6%
Population sources: 1880–1890; 1890–2000 1890–1920; 1890–1910 1910–1930; 1940–2000 2000; 2010 2020 * = Lost territory in previous decade.

=== 2020 census ===
As of the 2020 census, Riverton had a population of 2,764. The median age was 45.3 years. 21.6% of residents were under the age of 18 and 20.6% of residents were 65 years of age or older. For every 100 females there were 101.0 males, and for every 100 females age 18 and over there were 102.6 males age 18 and over.

100.0% of residents lived in urban areas, while 0.0% lived in rural areas.

There were 1,040 households in Riverton, of which 31.4% had children under the age of 18 living in them. Of all households, 54.5% were married-couple households, 17.3% were households with a male householder and no spouse or partner present, and 22.1% were households with a female householder and no spouse or partner present. About 24.3% of all households were made up of individuals and 9.8% had someone living alone who was 65 years of age or older.

There were 1,109 housing units, of which 6.2% were vacant. The homeowner vacancy rate was 1.8% and the rental vacancy rate was 8.6%.

Racial composition as of the 2020 census
Race	Number	Percent
White	2,396	86.7%
Black or African American	98	3.5%
American Indian and Alaska Native	4	0.1%
Asian	29	1.0%
Native Hawaiian and Other Pacific Islander	0	0.0%
Some other race	48	1.7%
Two or more races	189	6.8%
Hispanic or Latino (of any race)	139	5.0%

=== 2010 census ===
The 2010 United States census counted 2,779 people, 1,057 households, and 755 families in the borough. The population density was 4,179.4 per square mile (1,613.7/km^{2}). There were 1,112 housing units at an average density of 1,672.3 per square mile (645.7/km^{2}). The racial makeup was 93.41% (2,596) White, 3.31% (92) Black or African American, 0.11% (3) Native American, 0.76% (21) Asian, 0.07% (2) Pacific Islander, 0.47% (13) from other races, and 1.87% (52) from two or more races. Hispanic or Latino of any race were 2.02% (56) of the population.

Of the 1,057 households, 29.6% had children under the age of 18; 56.6% were married couples living together; 11.2% had a female householder with no husband present and 28.6% were non-families. Of all households, 23.8% were made up of individuals and 9.3% had someone living alone who was 65 years of age or older. The average household size was 2.52 and the average family size was 3.00.

21.4% of the population were under the age of 18, 6.7% from 18 to 24, 23.0% from 25 to 44, 31.0% from 45 to 64, and 17.9% who were 65 years of age or older. The median age was 44.2 years. For every 100 females, the population had 91.5 males. For every 100 females ages 18 and older there were 87.7 males.

The Census Bureau's 2006–2010 American Community Survey showed that (in 2010 inflation-adjusted dollars) median household income was $94,762 (with a margin of error of +/− $6,688) and the median family income was $112,721 (+/− $9,113). Males had a median income of $81,078 (+/− $9,544) versus $50,517 (+/− $6,553) for females. The per capita income for the borough was $47,945 (+/− $4,715). About 3.4% of families and 4.2% of the population were below the poverty line, including 5.4% of those under age 18 and 2.4% of those age 65 or over.

=== 2000 census ===
As of the 2000 United States census there were 2,759 people, 1,066 households, and 746 families residing in the borough. The population density was 4,205.1 inhabitants per square mile (1,623.6/km^{2}). There were 1,113 housing units at an average density of 1,696.4 per square mile (655.0/km^{2}). The racial makeup of the borough was 95.83% White, 1.78% African American, 0.11% Native American, 0.83% Asian, 0.00% Pacific Islander, 0.29% from other races, and 1.16% from two or more races. 1.09% of the population were Hispanic or Latino of any race.

There were 1,066 households, out of which 30.7% had children under the age of 18 living with them, 58.7% were married couples living together, 8.4% had a female householder with no husband present, and 30.0% were non-families. Another 25.3% of all households were made up of individuals, and 8.1% had someone living alone who was 65 years of age or older. The average household size was 2.48 and the average family size was 3.00.

In the borough the population was spread out, with 21.8% under the age of 18, 4.3% from 18 to 24, 29.8% from 25 to 44, 24.8% from 45 to 64, and 19.3% who were 65 years of age or older. The median age was 42 years. For every 100 females, there were 90.3 males. For every 100 females age 18 and over, there were 88.8 males.

The median income for a household in the borough was $58,977, and the median income for a family was $68,125. Males had a median income of $50,950 versus $36,042 for females. The per capita income for the borough was $30,223. 3.1% of the population and 2.0% of families were below the poverty line. Out of the total population, 4.5% of those under the age of 18 and 2.4% of those 65 and older were living below the poverty line.

== Government ==
=== Local government ===
Riverton is governed under the borough form of New Jersey municipal government, which is used in 218 municipalities (of the 564) statewide, making it the most common form of government in New Jersey. The governing body is composed of a mayor and a borough council, with all positions elected at-large on a partisan basis as part of the November general election. A mayor is elected directly by the voters to a four-year term of office. The borough council includes six members elected to serve three-year terms on a staggered basis, with two seats coming up for election each year in a three-year cycle. The borough form of government used by Riverton is a "weak mayor / strong council" government in which council members act as the legislative body with the mayor presiding at meetings and voting only in the event of a tie. The mayor can veto ordinances subject to an override by a two-thirds majority vote of the council. The mayor makes committee and liaison assignments for council members, and most appointments are made by the mayor with the advice and consent of the council.

As of 2024, the mayor of Riverton is Democrat James Quinn, whose term of office ends December 31, 2027. Members of the Riverton Borough Council are Council President Edgar Wilburn (D, 2026), Scott Reed (R, 2026), Leslie Harrison (D, 2027), Katie Lucas (D, 2027), Joseph Creighton (D, 2028), and Nicole Belolan (D, 2028).

In January 2016, the borough council selected Kirk Fullerton from three names nominated by the Republican municipal committee to fill the seat expiring in December 2016 that was vacated by Susan Cairns Wells when she took office as mayor.

=== Federal, state and county representation ===
Riverton is located in the 3rd Congressional District and is part of New Jersey's 7th state legislative district.

For the 119th United States Congress, New Jersey's 3rd congressional district is currently represented Herb Conaway (D, Delran Township). New Jersey is represented in the United States Senate by Democrats Cory Booker (Newark, term ends 2027) and Andy Kim (Moorestown, term ends 2031).

For the 2026–2027 session, the 7th legislative district of the New Jersey Legislature is represented in the State Senate by Troy Singleton (D, Palmyra) and in the General Assembly by Carol A. Murphy (D, Mount Laurel) and Balvir Singh (D, Burlington Township).

Burlington County is governed by a Board of County Commissioners comprised of five members who are chosen at-large in partisan elections to serve three-year terms of office on a staggered basis, with either one or two seats coming up for election each year; at an annual reorganization meeting, the board selects a director and deputy director from among its members to serve a one-year term. As of 2026, Burlington County's Commissioners are: Director Felicia Hopson (D, Willingboro Township, term as commissioner ends December 31, 2027; term as director ends 2026), Deputy Director Allison Eckel (D, Medford, term as commissioner ends 2028; term as deputy director ends 2026), Randy Brolo (D, Lumberton, 2026; elected to an unexpired term), Tyler Burrell (D, Delran Township, 2027) and Tom Pullion (D, Edgewater Park, 2026).

Burlington County's constitutional officers are Clerk Joanne Schwartz (D, Southampton Township, 2028), Sheriff James H. Kostoplis (D, Bordentown, 2028) and Surrogate Brian J. Carlin (D, Burlington Township, 2026).

=== Politics ===
United States presidential election results for Riverton 2024 2020 2016 2012 2008 2004
Year	Republican		Democratic		Third party(ies)	
Year	No.	%	No.	%	No.	%
2024	517	34.91%	942	63.61%	22	1.49%
2020	620	36.07%	1,070	62.25%	29	1.69%
2016	562	36.76%	871	56.97%	96	6.28%
2012	638	42.56%	838	55.90%	23	1.53%
2008	659	41.52%	912	57.47%	16	1.01%
2004	693	44.28%	858	54.82%	14	0.89%

As of March 2011, there were a total of 1,893 registered voters in Riverton, of which 571 (30.2% vs. 33.3% countywide) were registered as Democrats, 724 (38.2% vs. 23.9%) were registered as Republicans and 597 (31.5% vs. 42.8%) were registered as Unaffiliated. There was one voter registered to another party. Among the borough's 2010 Census population, 68.1% (vs. 61.7% in Burlington County) were registered to vote, including 86.7% of those ages 18 and over (vs. 80.3% countywide).

In the 2012 presidential election, Democrat Barack Obama received 838 votes (55.5% vs. 58.1% countywide), ahead of Republican Mitt Romney with 638 votes (42.3% vs. 40.2%) and other candidates with 23 votes (1.5% vs. 1.0%), among the 1,509 ballots cast by the borough's 1,951 registered voters, for a turnout of 77.3% (vs. 74.5% in Burlington County). In the 2008 presidential election, Democrat Barack Obama received 912 votes (57.2% vs. 58.4% countywide), ahead of Republican John McCain with 659 votes (41.3% vs. 39.9%) and other candidates with 16 votes (1.0% vs. 1.0%), among the 1,594 ballots cast by the borough's 1,919 registered voters, for a turnout of 83.1% (vs. 80.0% in Burlington County). In the 2004 presidential election, Democrat John Kerry received 858 votes (54.4% vs. 52.9% countywide), ahead of Republican George W. Bush with 693 votes (43.9% vs. 46.0%) and other candidates with 14 votes (0.9% vs. 0.8%), among the 1,578 ballots cast by the borough's 1,877 registered voters, for a turnout of 84.1% (vs. 78.8% in the whole county).

Gubernatorial election results for Riverton
Year	Republican		Democratic		Third party(ies)	
Year	No.	%	No.	%	No.	%
2025	514	36.15%	903	63.50%	5	0.35%
2021	510	43.74%	645	55.32%	11	0.94%
2017	410	42.09%	553	56.78%	11	1.13%
2013	591	63.41%	328	35.19%	13	1.39%
2009	502	46.57%	482	44.71%	94	8.72%
2005	448	44.36%	515	50.99%	47	4.65%

In the 2013 gubernatorial election, Republican Chris Christie received 591 votes (62.3% vs. 61.4% countywide), ahead of Democrat Barbara Buono with 328 votes (34.6% vs. 35.8%) and other candidates with 13 votes (1.4% vs. 1.2%), among the 949 ballots cast by the borough's 1,930 registered voters, yielding a 49.2% turnout (vs. 44.5% in the county). In the 2009 gubernatorial election, Republican Chris Christie received 502 votes (46.1% vs. 47.7% countywide), ahead of Democrat Jon Corzine with 482 votes (44.3% vs. 44.5%), Independent Chris Daggett with 85 votes (7.8% vs. 4.8%) and other candidates with 9 votes (0.8% vs. 1.2%), among the 1,089 ballots cast by the borough's 1,902 registered voters, yielding a 57.3% turnout (vs. 44.9% in the county).

United States Senate election results for Riverton1
Year	Republican		Democratic		Third party(ies)	
Year	No.	%	No.	%	No.	%
2024	490	33.27%	969	65.78%	14	0.95%
2018	580	41.88%	716	51.70%	89	6.43%
2012	596	41.33%	830	57.56%	16	1.11%
2006	469	45.49%	547	53.06%	15	1.45%

United States Senate election results for Riverton2
Year	Republican		Democratic		Third party(ies)	
Year	No.	%	No.	%	No.	%
2020	669	39.19%	1,002	58.70%	36	2.11%
2014	412	45.47%	480	52.98%	14	1.55%
2013	282	45.05%	338	53.99%	6	0.96%
2008	677	46.34%	759	51.95%	25	1.71%

== Historic district ==
- Riverton Historic District
- U.S. National Register of Historic Places
- U.S. Historic district
- New Jersey Register of Historic Places
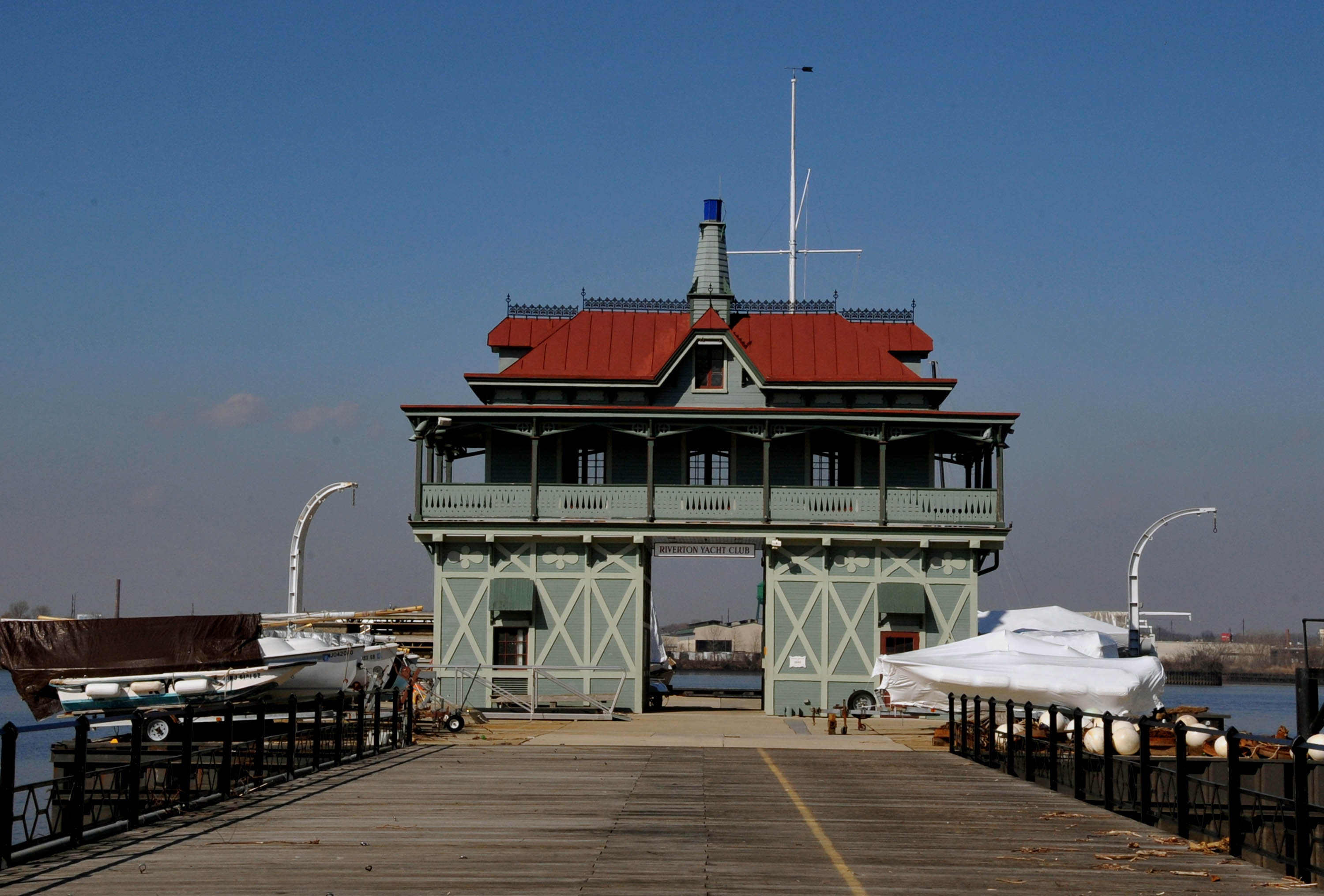
- Riverton Yacht Club
- Location: Roughly bounded by Delaware River, Park Avenue, Thomas Avenue, and Fulton Street
- Area: 80 acres (32 ha)
- Built: 1851
- Architectural style: Italianate, Gothic Revival
- NRHP reference No.: 99000271
- NJRHP No.: 56

Significant dates
- Added to NRHP: March 5, 1999
- Designated NJRHP: November 23, 1988

The Riverton Historic District is an 80-acre (32 ha) historic district encompassing the borough. It was added to the National Register of Historic Places on March 5, 1999, for its significance in architecture, community planning and development. The district has 371 contributing buildings, including the Riverton Yacht Club.

The Victorian house at 503 Bank Avenue was designed by architect Samuel Sloan and built in 1851. The Riverton Yacht Club was built in 1880 with Stick style.

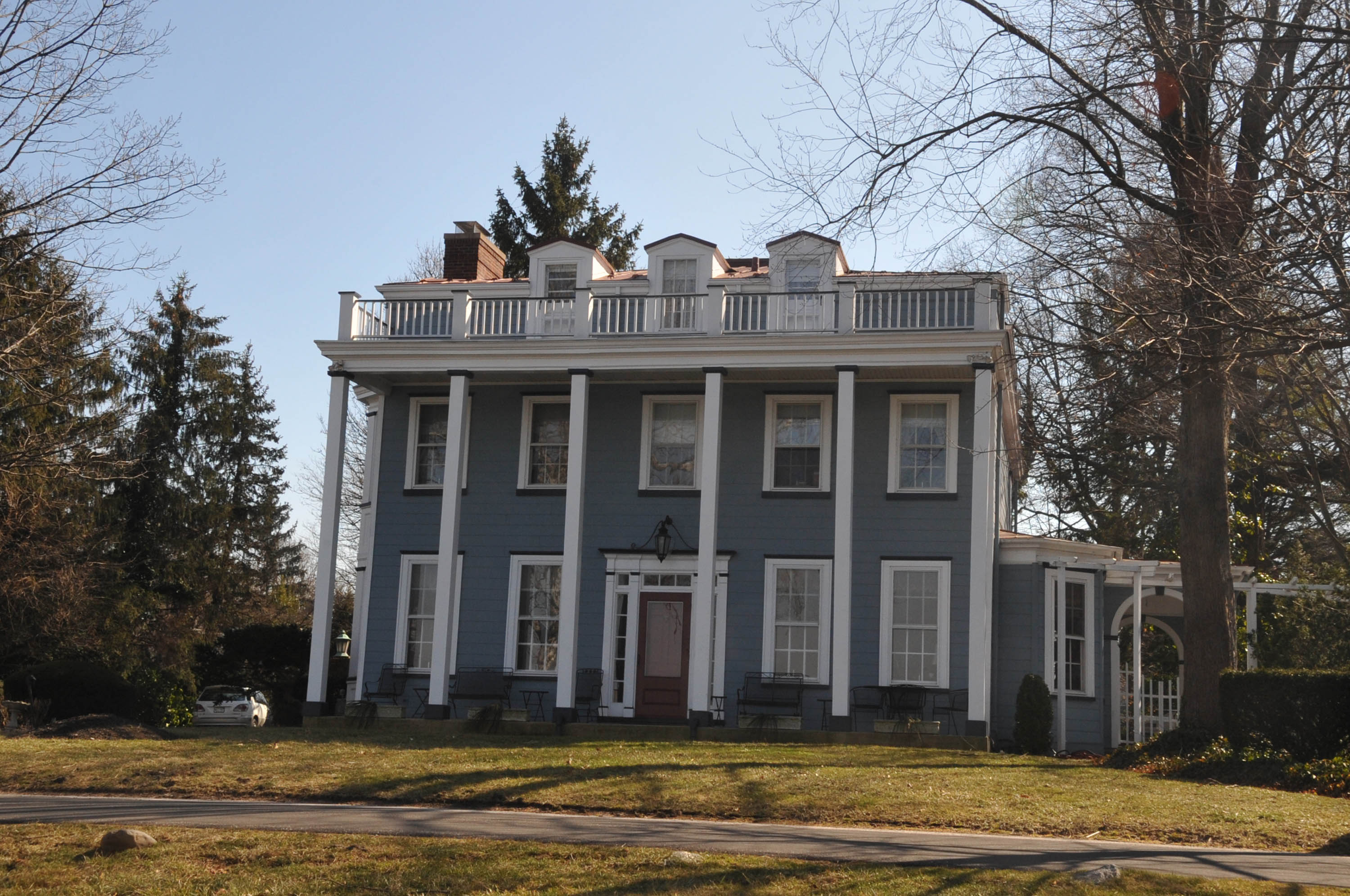
Victorian house at 503 Bank Avenue

== Education ==
The Riverton School District serves students in public school in pre-kindergarten through eighth grade at Riverton Elementary School. As of the 2021–22 school year, the district, comprised of one school, had an enrollment of 301 students and 29.0 classroom teachers (on an FTE basis), for a student–teacher ratio of 10.4:1.

For ninth through twelfth grades, public school students attend Palmyra High School as part of a sending/receiving relationship with the Palmyra Public Schools, along with students from Beverly. As of the 2023–24 school year, the school had an enrollment of 407 students and 33.8 classroom teachers (on an FTE basis), for a student–teacher ratio of 12.0:1.

Students from Riverton are eligible to attend the Burlington County Institute of Technology, a countywide public school providing vocational and technical education to students at the high school and post-secondary level at its campuses in Medford and Westampton.

== Transportation ==
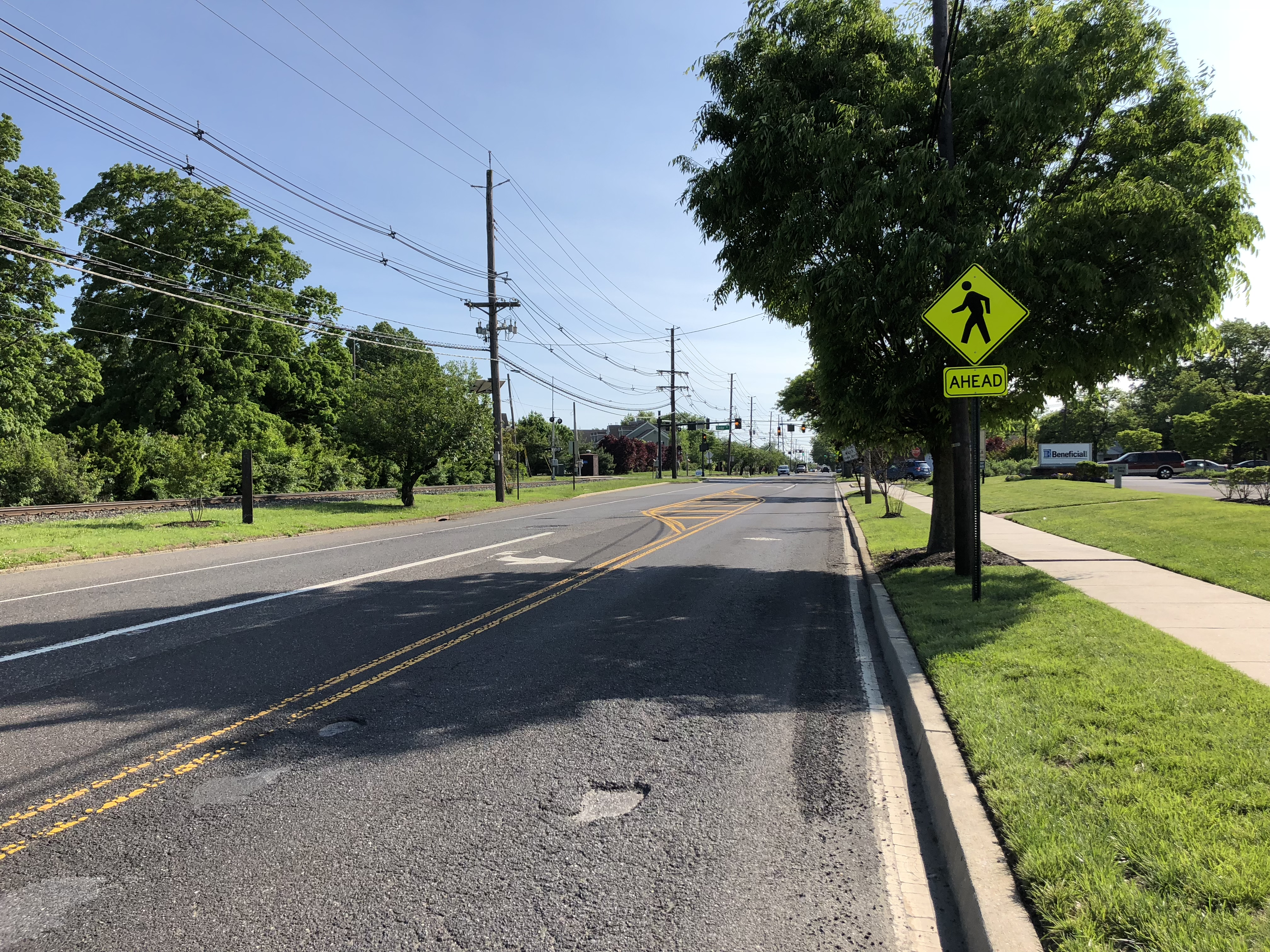
County Route 543 in Riverton

=== Roads and highways ===
As of May 2010, the borough had a total of 14.05 miles (22.61 km) of roadways, of which 12.42 miles (19.99 km) were maintained by the municipality and 1.63 miles (2.62 km) by Burlington County.

No Interstate, U.S. or state highways directly serve Riverton. The most prominent road crossing the borough is County Route 543.

=== Public transportation ===
The Riverton station located on Main Street provides service on the River Line light rail system, offering southbound service to Camden and the Walter Rand Transportation Center with connections to PATCO Speedline trains to Philadelphia and the Camden County suburbs and northbound service to the Trenton Rail Station with connections to NJ Transit trains to New York City, SEPTA trains to Philadelphia, and Amtrak trains.

NJ Transit provides bus service in the borough on the 419 route that runs between Camden and Burlington.

BurLink bus service is offered on the B8 route between the Riverside station and Hartford Crossing / Delran Township.

== Notable people ==
People who were born in, residents of, or otherwise closely associated with Riverton include:

- John Fraser (1825–1906), architect who served as acting supervisory architect for the United States Department of the Treasury, created a master plan for the United States Capitol grounds and served on the commission to complete the Washington Monument
- Nat Gertler (born 1965), writer best known for his comics and his books about comic books
- Lloyd Carpenter Griscom (1872–1959), American diplomat
- William Levis James (1833–1903), Union Army quartermaster and brevet brigadier general
- Charles Wellford Leavitt (1871–1928), landscape architect, urban planner and civil engineer
- Frank A. Mathews Jr. (1904–1964), represented New Jersey's 4th congressional district in the United States House of Representatives from 1945 to 1949
- Gladys J. Miller (1926–1993), architect active in Terre Haute, Indiana
- Philip Slater (1927–2013), sociologist who wrote the 1970 work The Pursuit of Loneliness
- F. Trowbridge vom Baur (1908–2000), lawyer who was General Counsel of the Navy from 1953 to 1960

Preceded by Cinnaminson Township	Bordering communities of Philadelphia	Succeeded by Palmyra
