= Henry Clay Moss House =

Historic house in Illinois, United States

- U.S. National Register of Historic Places
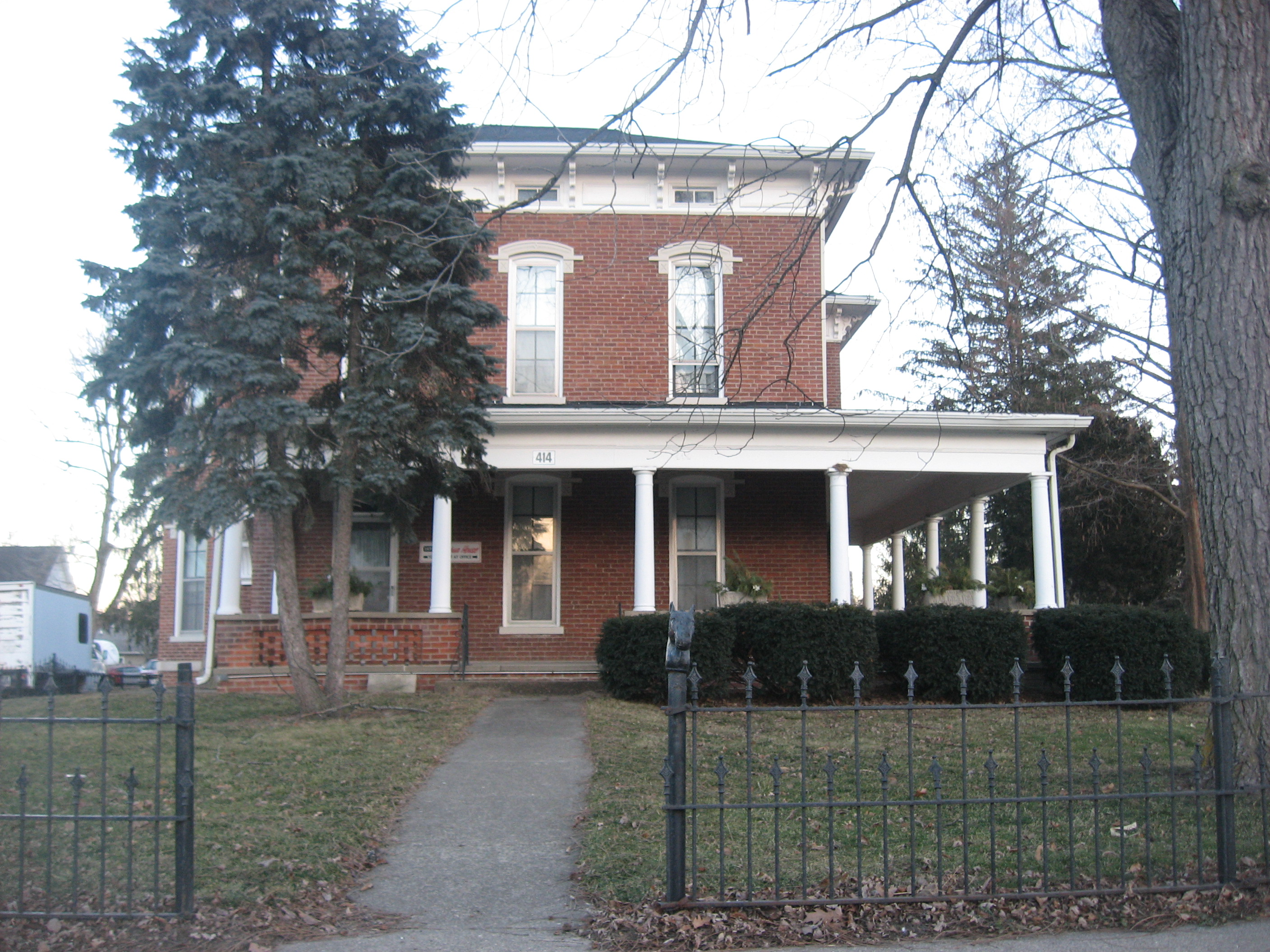

- Location within Illinois Location within the United States
- Interactive map showing the location of Henry Clay Moss House
- Location: 414 N. Main St., Paris, Illinois
- Coordinates: 39°36′55″N 87°41′42″W
- Area: less than one acre
- Built: 1876
- Architectural style: Italianate
- NRHP reference No.: 08000295
- Added to NRHP: April 16, 2008

The Henry Clay Moss House is a historic house located at 414 N. Main St. in Paris, Illinois. The Italianate house was built in 1876 for local businessman Henry Clay Moss. The home features a wraparound porch supported by columns, a hipped roof with a bracketed cornice, and a projecting hexagonal bay on its west side. The interior of the home includes home office space and features decorative wooden door and window surrounds and trim as well as a cantilevered flight of stairs. Moss lost the house in 1877, and it passed through a succession of owners until livestock breeder Daniel Arthur bought the home in 1895; the home remained in the Arthur family until 1976.

The house was added to the National Register of Historic Places on April 16, 2008. The Edgar County Historical Society currently operates a museum in the home.
