= Terre Haute Post Office and Federal Building =

Historic building in Terre Haute, Indiana, U.S.

- U.S. National Register of Historic Places
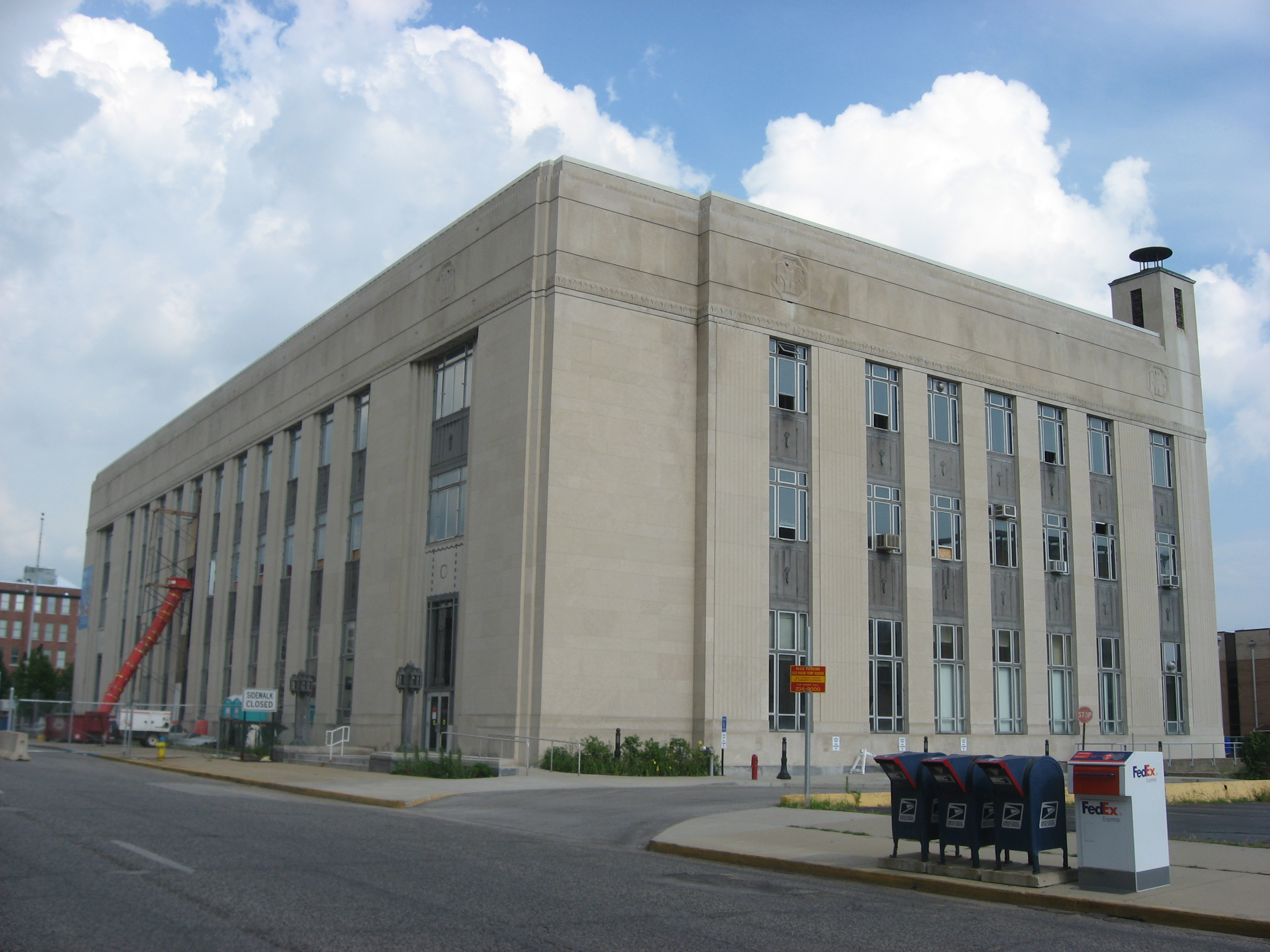
- Front and western side of the building

- Location within Vigo County, Indiana Location within Indiana Location within the United States
- Location: 7th and Cherry, Terre Haute, Indiana, U.S.
- Coordinates: 39°28′2″N 87°24′27″W
- Area: 74,515 square feet
- Built: 1934
- Architect: Miller & Yeager
- Architectural style: PWA Moderne
- MPS: Downtown Terre Haute MRA
- NRHP reference No.: 84003813
- Added to NRHP: August 13, 1984

The Terre Haute Post Office and Federal Building is a historic structure in Terre Haute, Indiana, United States.

The first post office and federal building at this site opened in 1887. When this building was demolished in 1933, work began on the current structure. (The columns and pediment from the first post office now make up part of the Chauncey Rose Memorial in Terre Haute's Fairbanks Park.) The current building was funded as Public Works Project under the presidency of Franklin D. Roosevelt.

The three-story PWA Moderne post office was built 1934 to the designs of Terre Haute–based architects Miller & Yeager for the cost of around $450,000. Completed on December 1, 1934, the building opened to the public in 1935. It originally was home to the post office, the Social Security Administration, the Federal Bureau of Investigation, the Internal Revenue Service and the federal court. The federal courtroom features a mural by Frederick Webb Ross titled "The Signing of the Magna Carta."

The building was placed on the National Register of Historic Places in 1984.

In 2007, the GSA turned over the facility to Indiana State; following a $30-million dollar, multi-year renovation; the building became the new home of the Indiana State University Scott College of Business. The first classes were held during the Fall 2012 semester.

== See also ==
- List of United States post offices
