= Shaw-Van Gilder House =

Historic house in Illinois, United States

- U.S. National Register of Historic Places
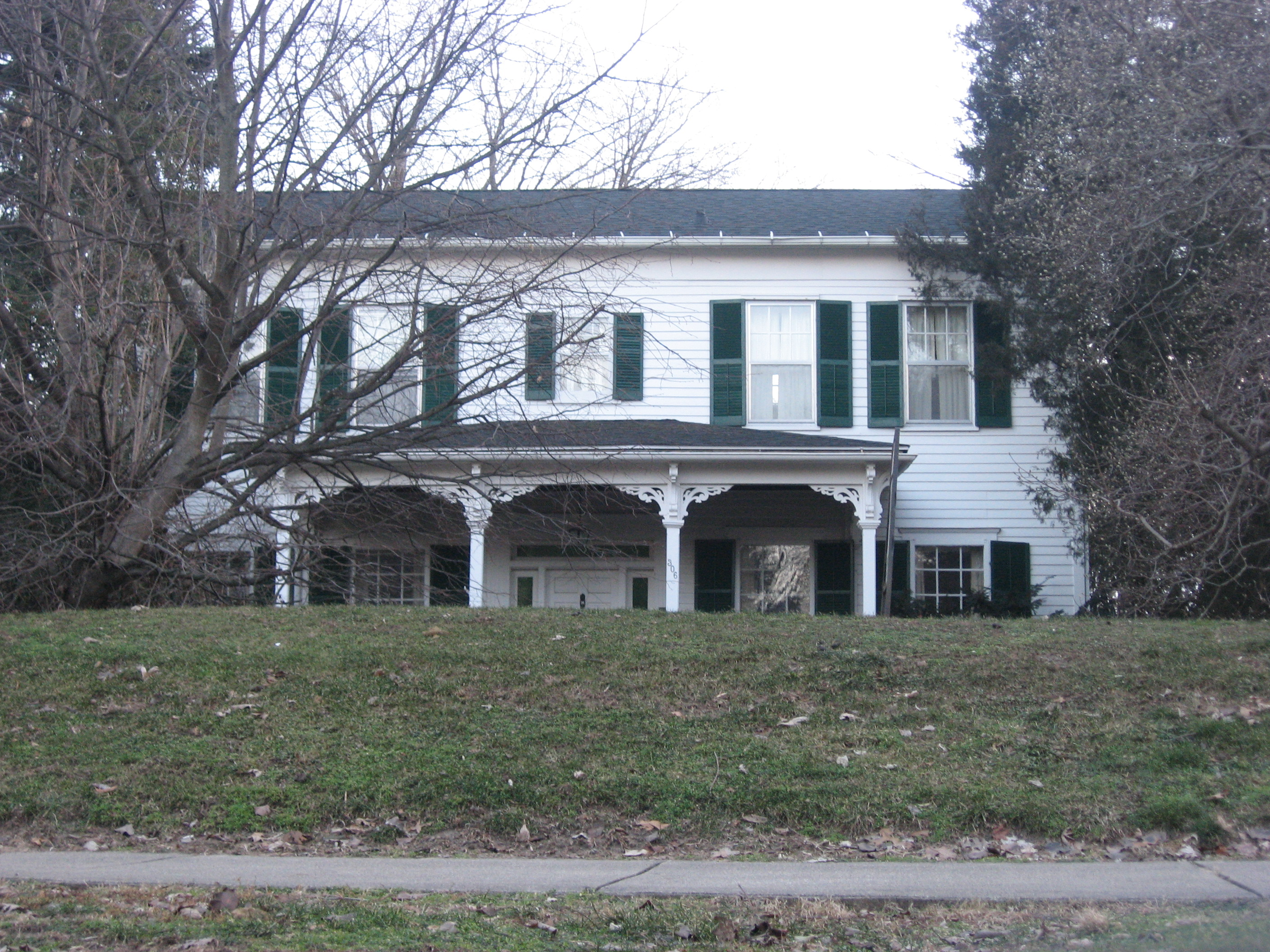

- Location within Illinois Location within the United States
- Location: 306 E. Crawford St., Paris, Illinois
- Coordinates: 39°36′27″N 87°41′29″W
- Area: less than one acre
- Built: 1853
- Built by: Shaw, Elvis Perry
- Architectural style: I-house
- NRHP reference No.: 07000116
- Added to NRHP: March 5, 2007

The Shaw-Van Gilder House is a historic house located at 306 E. Crawford St. in Paris, Illinois. Elvis Perry Shaw, a local businessman and mercantile clerk, built the house in 1853. The house is an example of an I-house, a vernacular style named for its popularity in the three Midwestern states beginning with "I". Characteristic features of the I-house which can be seen in the Shaw-Van Gilder House include the five symmetrical bays on its front and its central interior corridor. The house's design was also influenced by the Greek Revival and Italianate styles; the former style can be seen in the home's front entrance, windows, and roof, while the latter can be seen in its bracketed porch. Shaw and his family lived in the house until 1941, when Shaw's descendants sold the property to the Van Gilder family.

The house was added to the National Register of Historic Places on March 5, 2007.
