= Newell High School =

- U.S. National Register of Historic Places
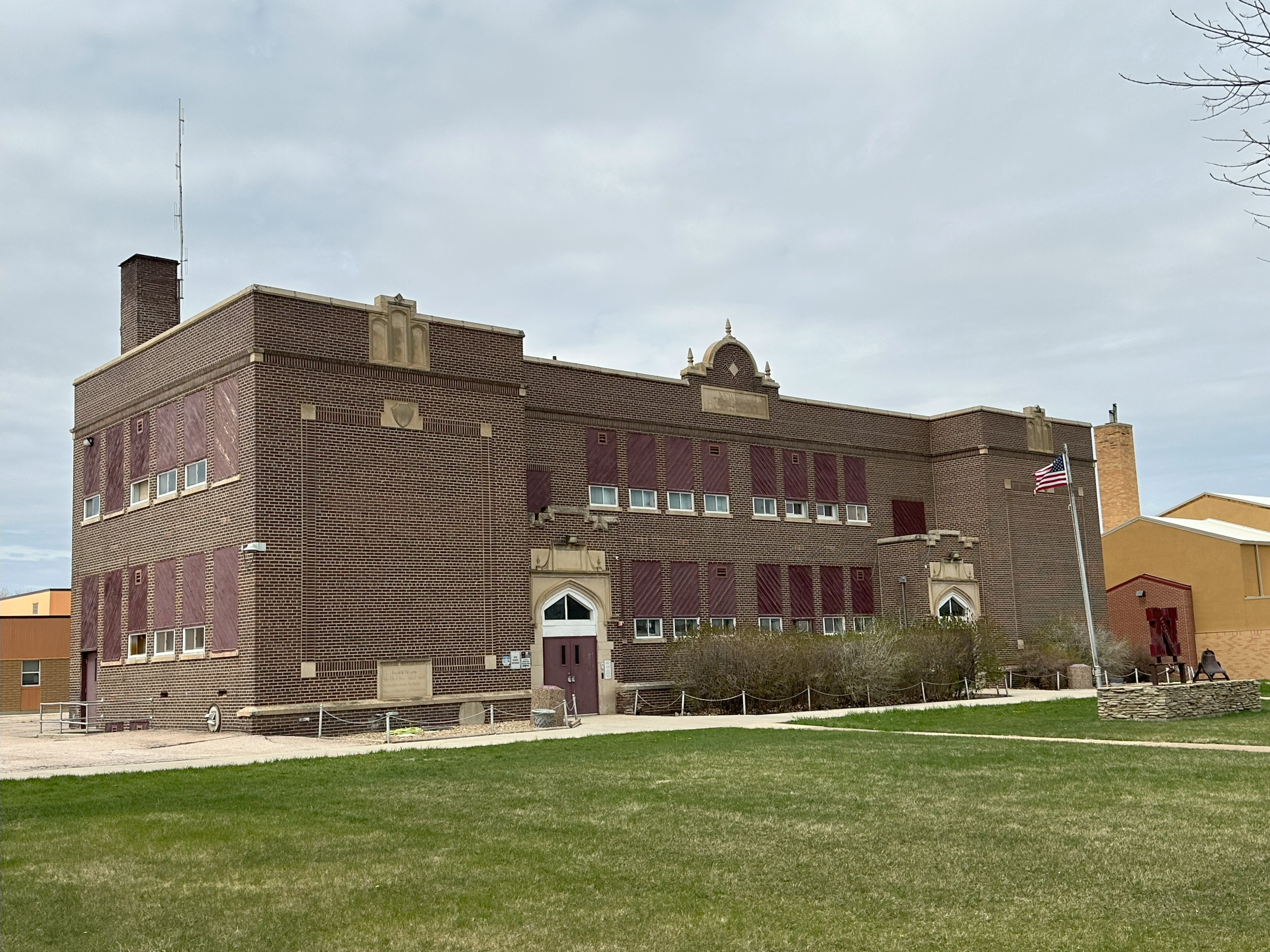
- The building in 2025

- Location within South Dakota Location within the United States
- Location: Dartmouth St. Newell, South Dakota
- Coordinates: 44.7168°N 103.4261°W
- Area: less than one acre
- Built: 1922
- Architect: Johnson, Miller & Miller
- Architectural style: Late 19th and 20th Century Revivals, English Vernacular Revival
- MPS: Rural Butte and Meade Counties MRA
- NRHP reference No.: 86000947
- Added to NRHP: May 1, 1986

The Newell High School, on Dartmouth St. between 4th and 5th Streets in Newell, South Dakota, United States, was built in 1922 and for school to begin in 1923. It was listed on the National Register of Historic Places in 1986.

It is a two-story brick building with a full basement. It has Tudor arch doorways on its first floor and stone trim, and the building is "topped with Tudor battlements." It was designed by architects Johnson, Miller & Miller.

It was deemed to be "the most imposing structure in Newell (1983 population, 638)" and "architecturally significant to Newell and South Dakota as an outstanding example of the English Vernacular Revival." The school was also deemed to have "significance in the area of education through its distinction as the largest rural school in Butte County with the most complete curriculum available to public school students."
