= Troy Porter =

- Born: April 15, 1855; Fayette County, Kentucky
- Died: September 25, 1929 (aged 74); Terre Haute, Indiana
- Occupation: plumber
- Political party: Republican

Troy Porter (1855–1929) was a plumber, politician, and civil rights leader in Paris, Illinois.

Troy Porter was born in Fayette County, Kentucky April 15, 1855. His parents were Winnie Porter, who had been born a slave, and a man whose name may have been Troy or John Porter. The elder Porter enlisted in the Union Army during the American Civil War (1861–1865) and died at the Battle of Perryville. Winnie escaped to Camp Nelson in Kentucky, and then to Ripley, Ohio. In 1865, through the influence of Rev. Granville Moody (a Union Army officer), they moved to Paris, Illinois. At the age of eleven he began to learn the trade of plumbing, gas and steam fitting. On November 21, 1876, he began to work for himself. He became an important member of the local Republican Party and in 1882 he was appointed superintendent of the Paris Water Works. In 1885 he was elected town clerk of the township and was reelected to the position in 1887.

He was a prominent member of a number of social societies. He joined the Grand United Order of Odd Fellows in 1877 and was district secretary from 1881 until August 1886. In 1895, Porter was a leader in an Illinois branch of the National Afro-American League which organized to improve the condition and support the civil rights of blacks. It was particularly concerned with black miners who were victims of the 1895 Spring Valley, Illinois race riots. Porter was a member of the executive committee. Porter remained involved with civil rights and was a member of the Afro-American State Protective League of Illinois and was a delegate to the 1898 convention of African Americans coincident with the 1898 World's Fair in Omaha, Nebraska. In July 1914, Porter was a delegate to the Negro National Education congress in Oklahoma City.

Winnie Porter, Troy's mother, died at a reported age of 101 in 1909. Porter married a woman named Cora, and died August 25, 1929, in Terre Haute, Indiana.
