= Erin Hutchison =

Former Christian recording artist (born 1979)

- Cover of Hutchison's debut album, Out of the Box

Background information
- Born: Erin Hutchison; July 20, 1979
- Origin: Paris, Illinois, United States
- Years active: 2005
- Label: Creative Soul Records

Erin Hutchison (born July 20, 1979) is an American former Christian recording artist. Her album Out of the Box was released in 2005.

== Sources ==
- "Erin Hutchison". 'NdiePedia. 30 October 2013.
- "Erin Hutchison". Apple Music.
- "Unfailing". Amazon Music.
- "Erin Hutchison — album review". Alpha Omega News. March 2006.
- "Erin Hutchison". AllMusic.
- "Erin Hutchison". Christian Music Town.
