= Citizens' Trust Company Building =

- U.S. National Register of Historic Places
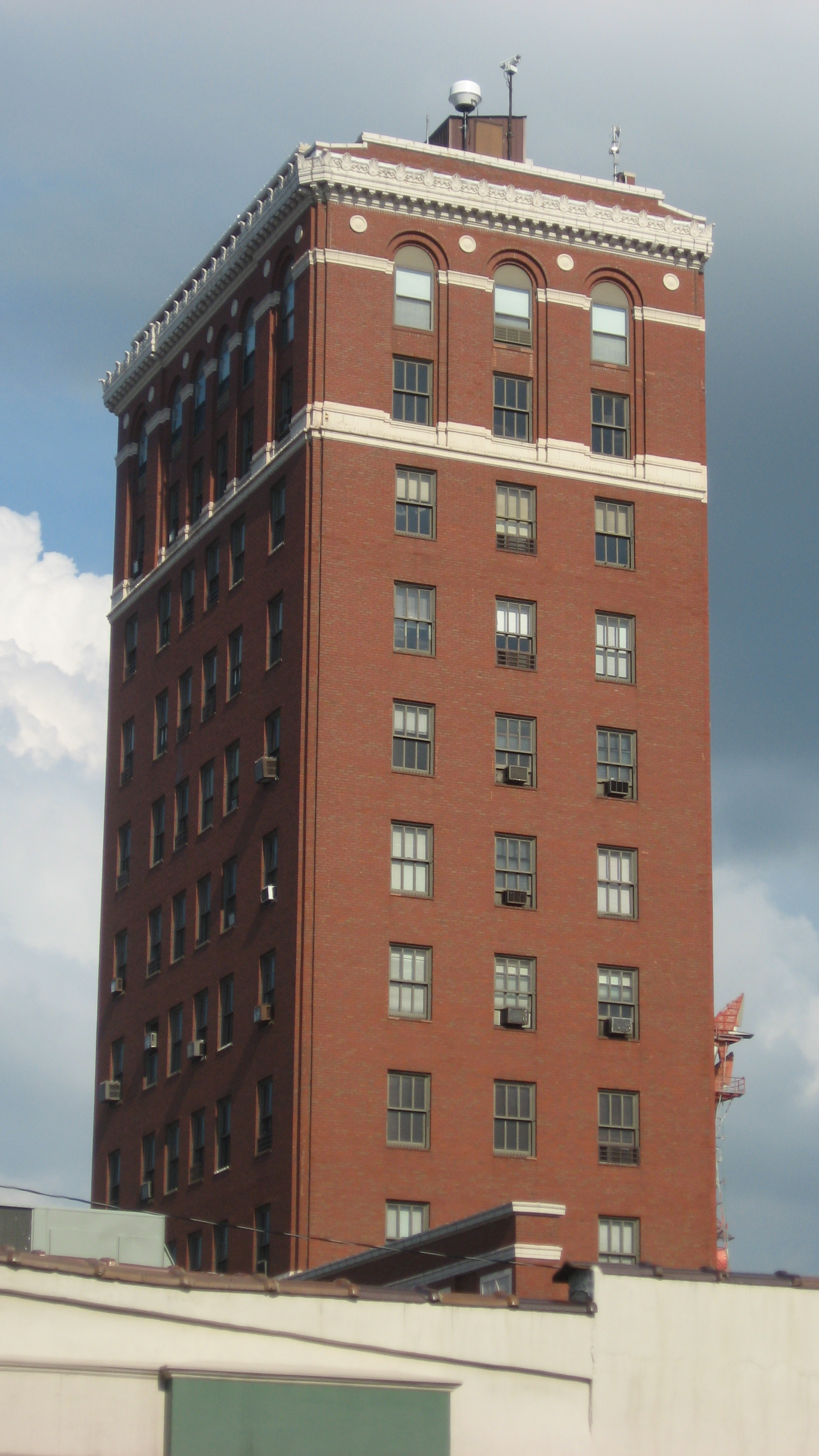
- Sycamore Building, July 2011

- Location within Vigo County, Indiana Location within Indiana Location within the United States
- Location: 19-21 S. 6th St., Terre Haute, Indiana
- Coordinates: 39°27′58″N 87°24′36″W
- Area: less than one acre
- Built: 1921-1922
- Architect: Johnson, Miller & Miller
- Architectural style: Chicago, Art Deco
- MPS: Downtown Terre Haute MRA
- NRHP reference No.: 83000156
- Added to NRHP: June 30, 1983

Citizens' Trust Company Building, also known as the Sycamore Building, is a historic office building located at Terre Haute, Indiana. It was designed in 1920 by the local firm of Johnson, Miller & Miller and built in 1921–1922, and is a 12-story, Chicago school style steel frame building sheathed in brick. It features stone and terra cotta detailing and Art Deco style design elements. The building was built to house the main office of the Citizens' Trust Company.

It was listed on the National Register of Historic Places in 1983.
