= Paris Elks Lodge No. 812 Building =

- U.S. National Register of Historic Places
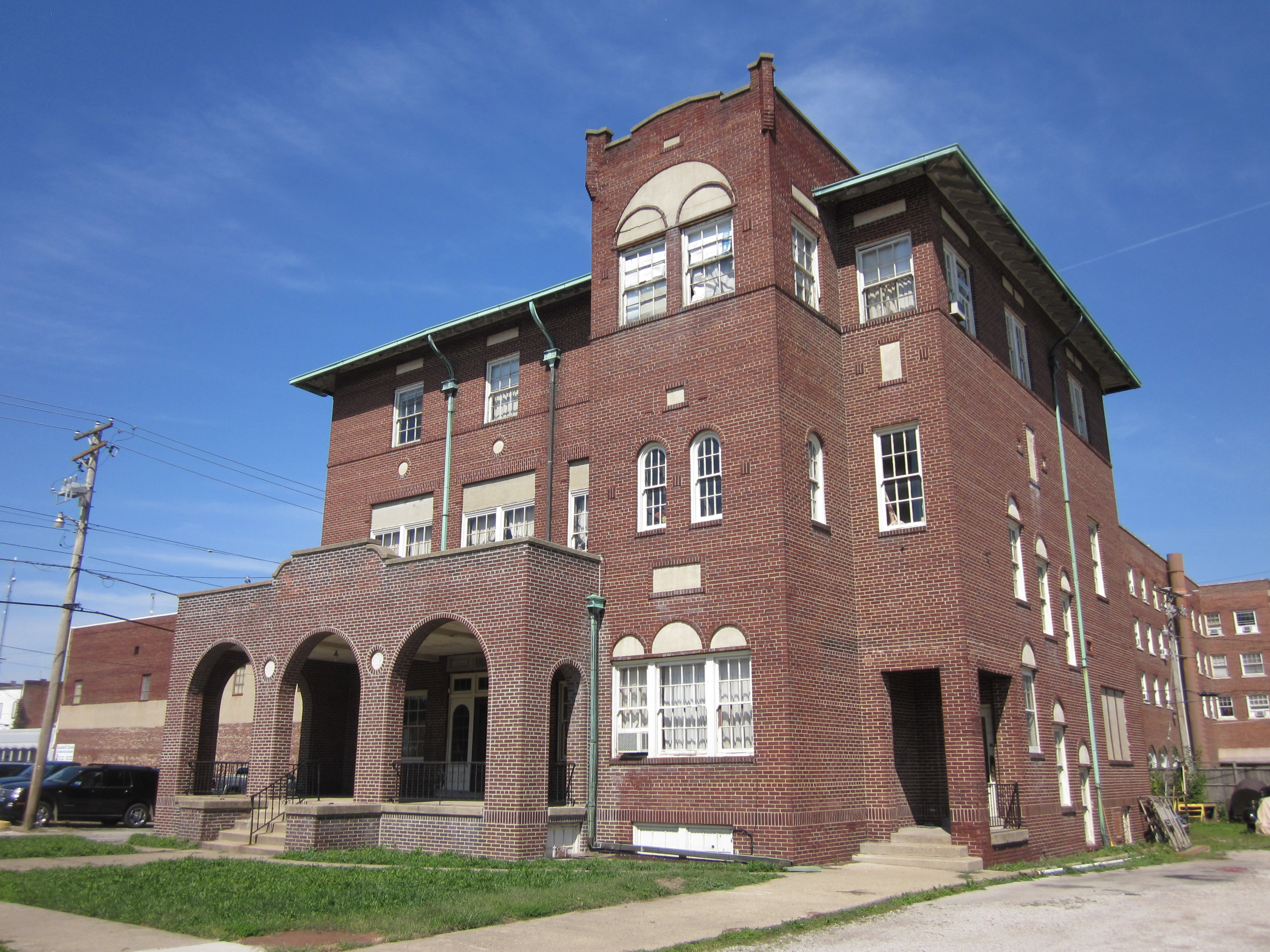

- Location within Illinois Location within the United States
- Location: 111 E. Washington St., Paris, Illinois
- Coordinates: 39°36′47″N 87°41′38″W
- Area: less than one acre
- Built: 1927
- Architect: Blackman, Everett
- Architectural style: Mediterranean Revival
- NRHP reference No.: 87001343
- Added to NRHP: August 6, 1987

The Paris Elks Lodge No. 812 Building is a historic building located at 111 E. Washington St. in Paris, Illinois. The building served as a meeting place for the Paris lodge of the Benevolent and Protective Order of Elks. The building was constructed in 1927, 25 years after the Paris Lodge was chartered. Architect Everett Blackman, a member of the lodge, designed the building in the Mediterranean Revival style. Blackman's design features an arcade loggia enclosing the front entrance and a square tower with a parapet roof designed to resemble elk antlers. The building's amenities included a bar and ballroom on the second floor, a bowling alley in the basement, and meeting rooms for the lodge. The third floor of the building housed rooms for the adjacent France Hotel; it was connected to the hotel by a stone walkway and cannot be accessed from the lower floors. The Elks used the building until the lodge filed for bankruptcy in 1978.

The building was added to the National Register of Historic Places on August 6, 1987.
