= Asher Morton Farmstead =

- U.S. National Register of Historic Places
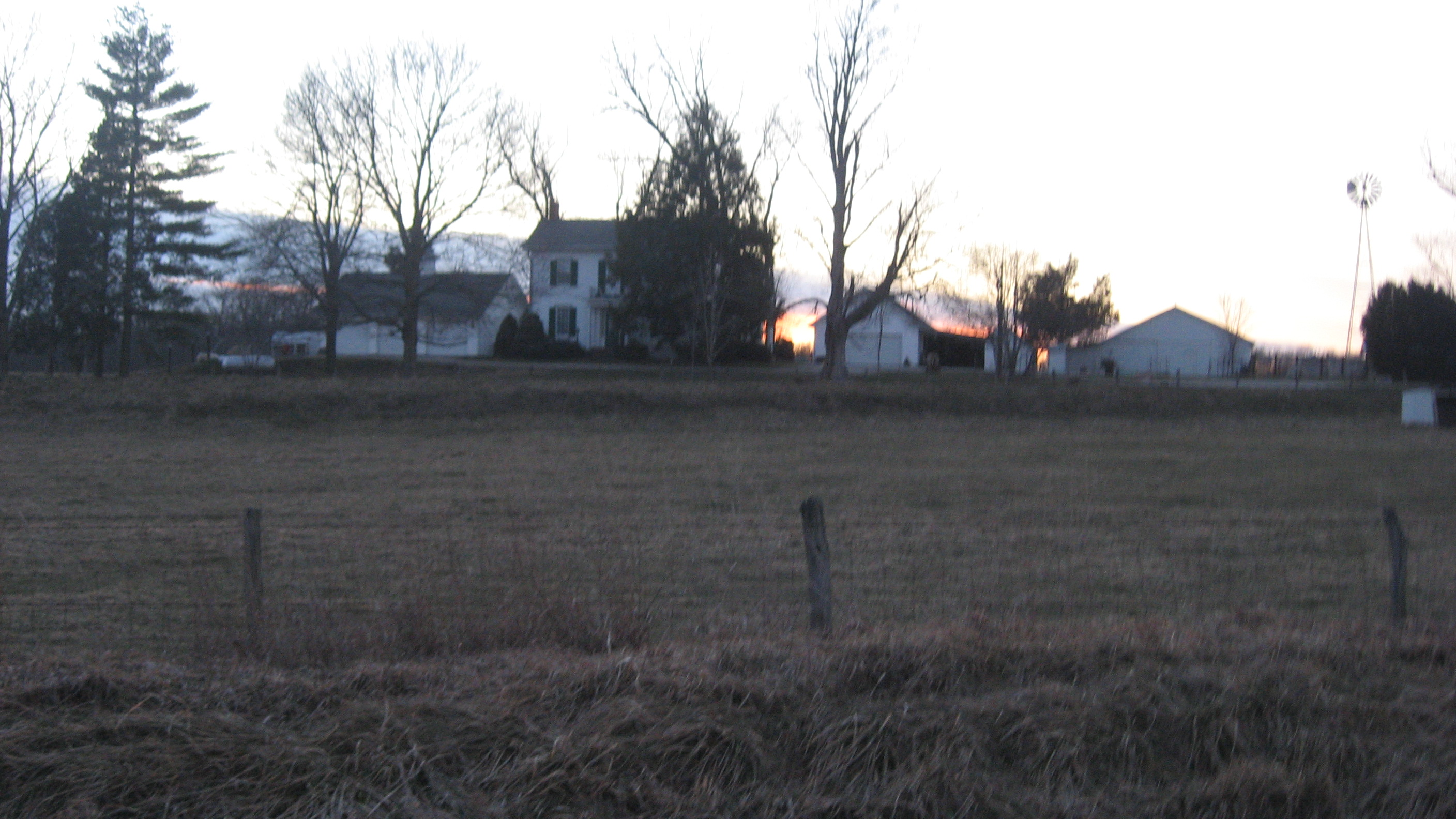
- Roadside view of the farm at dusk

- Location within Illinois Location within the United States
- Location: Edgar County, Illinois, USA
- Nearest city: Paris
- Coordinates: 39°32′22″N 87°38′39″W
- Area: 6 acres (2.4 ha)
- Built: 1860
- Architect: Asher Morton
- Architectural style: Greek Revival, I-House
- NRHP reference No.: 96000096
- Added to NRHP: February 29, 1996

The Asher Morton Farmstead is a farm located on Lower Terre Haute Road 4.5 miles (7.2 km) south of Paris, Illinois. The farmstead was constructed circa 1860 by Asher Morton, an Ohioan who moved to the area in 1850. The farmhouse is an I-house, a vernacular style of house named for its popularity in the three Midwestern "I" states of Illinois, Indiana, and Iowa. The house features two rooms on each floor with a central hall and staircase, the typical floor plan of the "Classic" style of I-house; however, the house has three front bays, while Classic I-houses typically had five. The exterior design of the house is influenced by the Greek Revival and Gothic Revival styles. The farmstead also includes a summer kitchen and a barn, which were also built by Morton.

The house was added to the National Register of Historic Places on February 29, 1996.
