= France Hotel =

- U.S. National Register of Historic Places
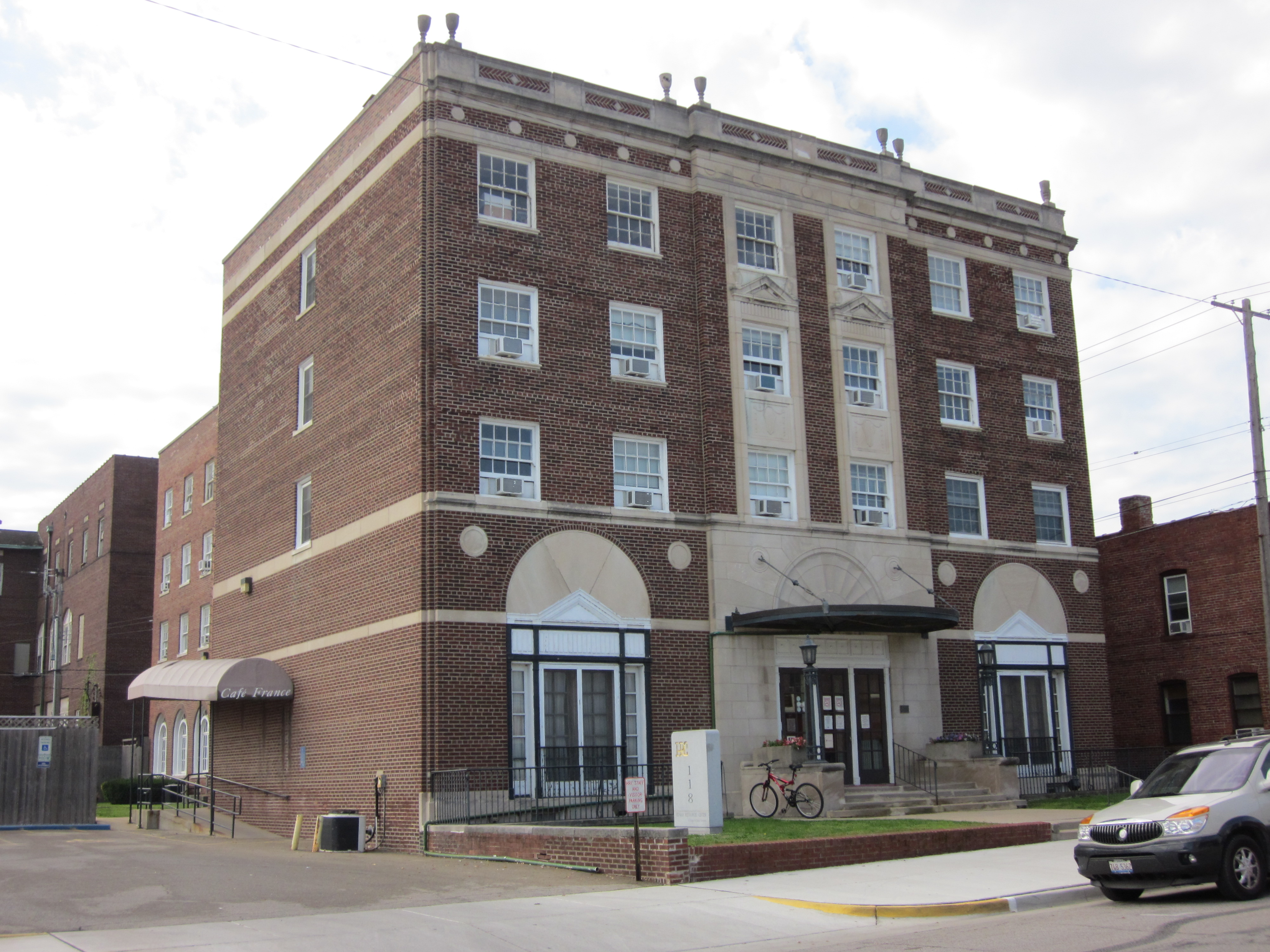

- Location within Illinois Location within the United States
- Location: 118 E. Court St., Paris, Illinois
- Coordinates: 39°36′47″N 87°41′38″W
- Area: less than one acre
- Built: 1924
- Architect: Johnson, Miller & Miller
- Architectural style: Classical Revival
- NRHP reference No.: 87001305
- Added to NRHP: August 3, 1987

The France Hotel is a historic hotel located at 118 East Court Street in Paris, Illinois, United States. The Classical Revival building was constructed in 1924. It is listed on the National Register of Historic Places.

== History ==
The hotel was constructed in 1924 to replace the old Paris Hotel, which was destroyed in a fire in 1918. The hotel's construction was sponsored by the Paris Chamber of Commerce and funded by the citizens of Paris; as most hotels of the era were built by private firms, this was considered unusual. The Chamber decided upon the site of the hotel in 1922 and chose the building's architect, but planning and construction delays pushed the project back into 1923. By September 1923, the Chamber had nearly exhausted its funds, and the hotel's contractor intended to place a lien on the hotel site if they could not find more money. The citizens of Paris responded by raising $191,000 in a fundraising effort, providing the necessary funds to complete the hotel.

Paris was a major railroad junction in the 1920s, as three major rail lines passed through the city. In addition, as Paris was the county seat of Edgar County, it served as the center for county administration and business activities. The hotel therefore became an important meeting place for Edgar County's citizens and travelers through Paris. Visitors considered the France Hotel to have more modern facilities than any other Paris hotel; these facilities included warm and cold running water, an elevator, and bathrooms in each room. In addition, the hotel included amenities and business such as a barber shop, beauty parlor, coffee shop, banquet hall, and private dining rooms, which served local residents as well as visitors.

The France Hotel was added to the National Register of Historic Places on August 3, 1987. The Paris Elks Lodge No. 812 Building, which borders the hotel to the south, was added to the National Register at the same time.

== Architecture ==
Architect Ewing Miller Sr., of the Fort Wayne, Indiana, architectural firm Johnson, Miller & Miller, designed the hotel in the Classical Revival style. The four-story building was built in red brick and uses Bedford limestone in many of its decorations. The building's entrance is set in smooth limestone and is topped by an arched stone decoration resembling a fanlight. A pair of French doors are located on either side of the entrance; each set of doors is topped by a wooden pediment and stone arches. The upper stories of the building each have six bays of windows; the center two bays are surrounded by vertical courses of limestone, with decorative stone pediments topping the third-floor windows. An architrave is situated above the fourth-floor windows; the architrave is topped by a brick frieze with limestone roundels, which is itself topped by a cornice and parapet roofline. Stone urns rest atop the corners and center of the roofline.
