= Edgar County Courthouse =

Local government building in the United States

- U.S. National Register of Historic Places
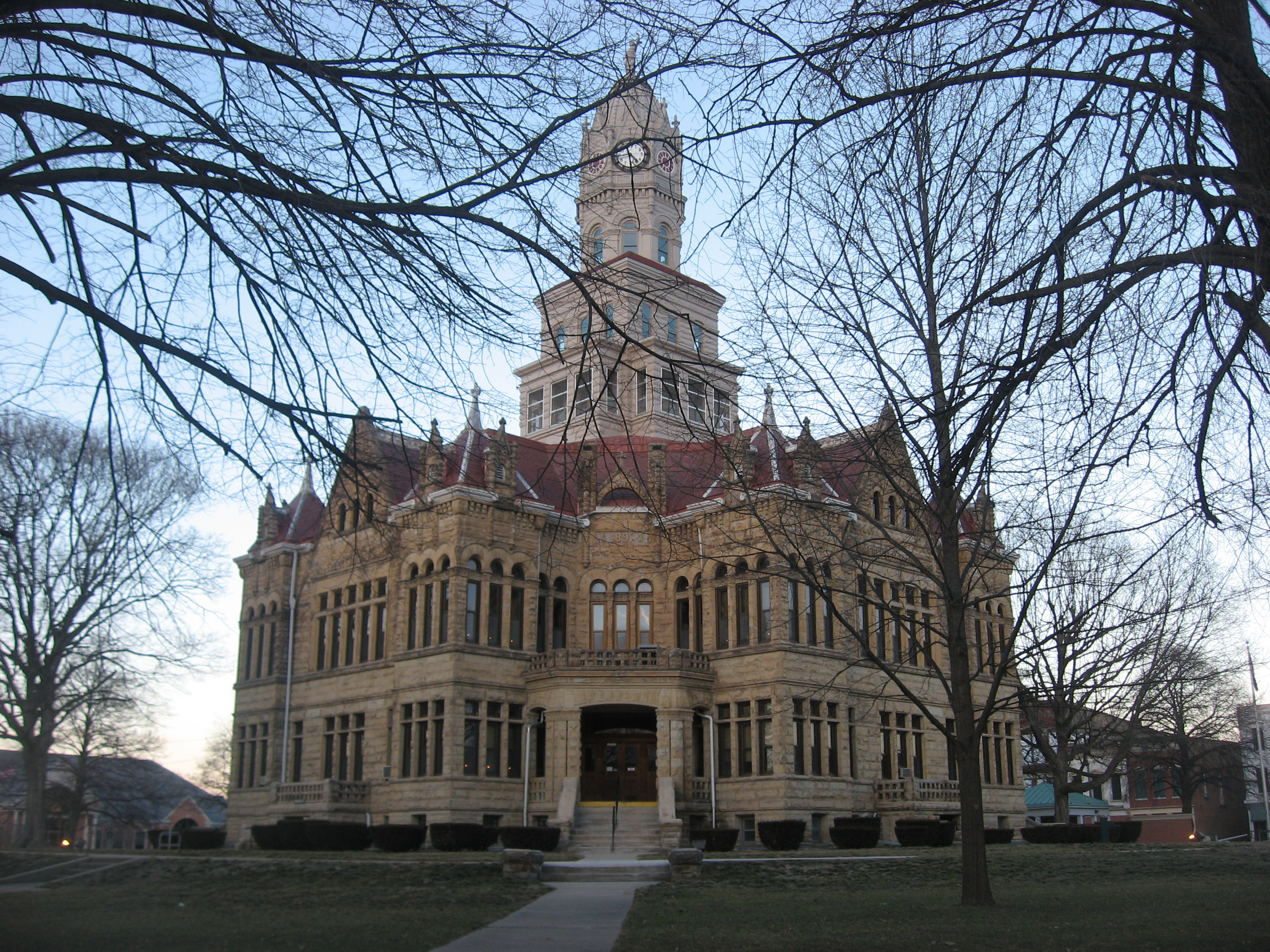
- The Edgar County Courthouse in Paris, Illinois.

- Location within Illinois Location within the United States
- Interactive map showing the location of Edgar County Courthouse
- Location: Main St., Paris, Illinois
- Coordinates: 39°36′47″N 87°41′38″W
- Area: 2 acres (0.81 ha)
- Built: 1891–93
- Architect: Henry Elliot
- Architectural style: Romanesque Revival
- NRHP reference No.: 81000221
- Added to NRHP: June 4, 1981

The Edgar County Courthouse, located in Paris, Illinois, is the county courthouse of Edgar County. The courthouse was constructed from 1891 until 1893; it is the third building to be used as Edgar County's courthouse. Architect Henry Elliot designed the building in the Romanesque Revival style. The courthouse's exterior has four main sides and four entrances situated between each adjacent pair of sides. Each side includes two towers at each end and a central section with a tall gable. Each tower features two medieval dormers. A wedding-cake style iron clock tower, built shortly after the building was completed, tops the center of the courthouse.

The courthouse was added to the National Register of Historic Places on June 4, 1981.
