= Paris, Illinois =

City in Illinois, United States

- City
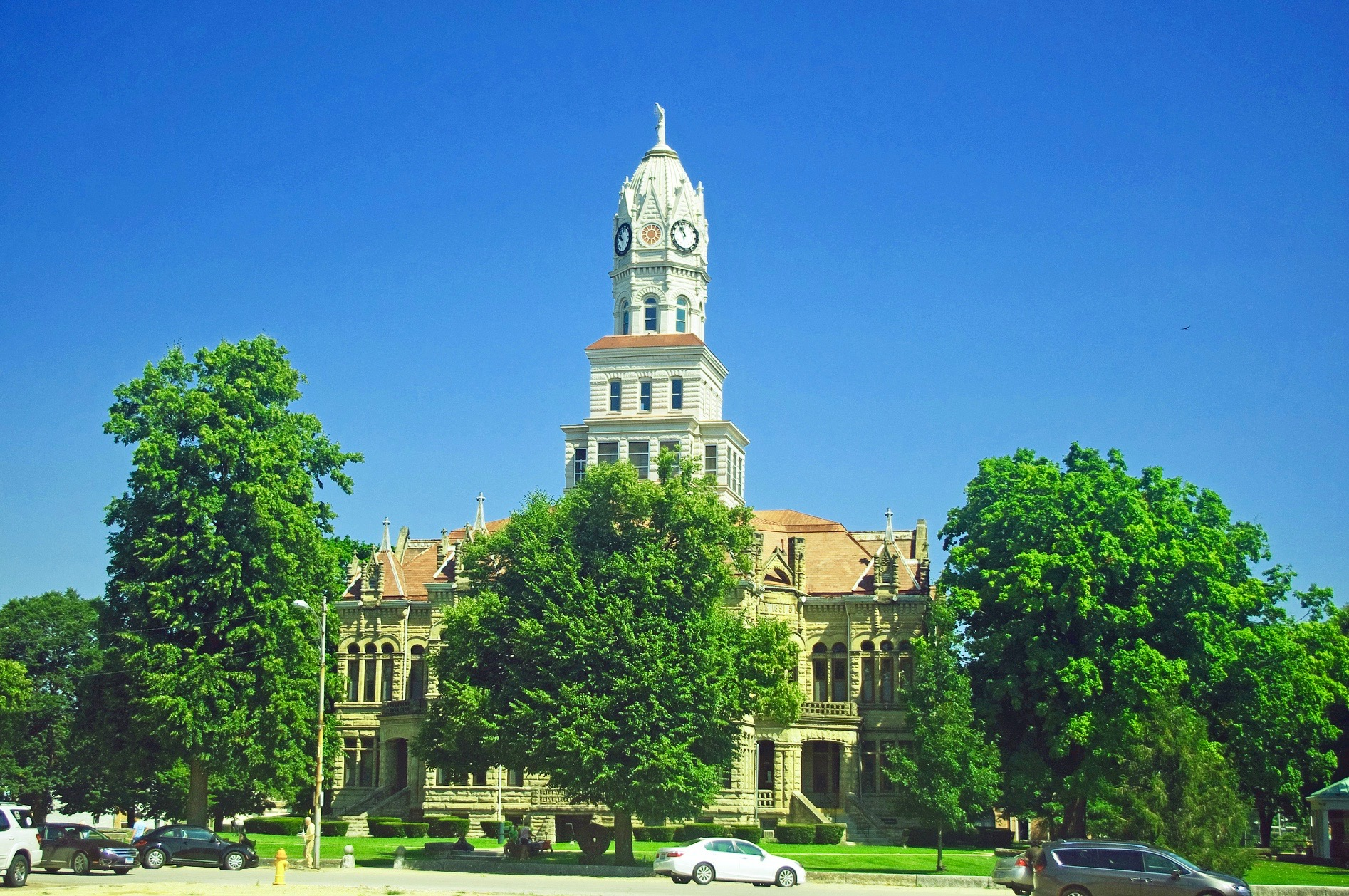
- Edgar County Courthouse in Paris

- Seal
- Interactive map of Paris, Illinois
- Location within Edgar County, Illinois Location within Illinois Location within the United States
- Coordinates: 39°37′30″N 87°41′30″W
- Country: United States
- State: Illinois
- County: Edgar
- Township: Paris, Symmes

Area
  - Total: 6.06 sq mi (15.70 km^{2})
  - Land: 5.68 sq mi (14.71 km^{2})
  - Water: 0.38 sq mi (0.99 km^{2})
- Elevation: 715 ft (218 m)

Population (2020)
  - Total: 8,291
  - Density: 1,460.0/sq mi (563.69/km^{2})
- Time zone: UTC-6 (CST)
  - Summer (DST): UTC-5 (CDT)
- ZIP Code: 61944
- Area code: 217
- FIPS code: 17–57628
- GNIS feature ID: 2396141
- Website: parisillinois.org

Paris is a city in Edgar County, Illinois, United States. It is 165 miles (266 km) south of Chicago and 90 miles (140 km) west of Indianapolis. The population was 8,291 at the 2020 census. It is the county seat and largest city in Edgar County.

== History ==
Paris was established in 1826 on land donated by Samuel Vance to be the county seat, and was incorporated as a village in 1849. The town most likely received its name from the word "Paris" carved into a jack oak tree in the middle of what became the town and not after France's capital.

Paris's history includes the service of two brothers, Walter Booth and Newton Booth, as its mayors in the mid-1850s. Newton Booth later moved west to California, where he served as governor and a U.S. senator.

The commission form of government was adopted in 1915. In 1907, L. A. G. Shoaff bought the Centralia White Stockings and renamed them the Paris Colts. In 1908 the team was renamed the Paris Parisians. After the 1908 season the team went under. In the 1950s Paris was home to a minor league baseball team named the Paris Lakers. A contest was held among the community to decide on a name for the team. James C. Dickey's submission, the Paris Lakers, was chosen. The Lakers were the 1956 Midwest League Champions and were an affiliate of the Chicago Cubs.

== Geography ==
According to the 2021 Census Gazetteer files, Paris has a total area of 6.06 square miles (15.70 km^{2}), of which 5.68 square miles (14.71 km^{2}) (or 93.70%) is land and 0.38 square miles (0.98 km^{2}) (or 6.30%) is water.

=== Climate ===
Climate is characterized by relatively high temperatures and evenly distributed precipitation throughout the year. The Köppen Climate Classification subtype for this climate is "Cfa" (Humid Subtropical Climate).

Climate data for Paris, Illinois (1991–2020 normals, extremes 1893–present)
Month	Jan	Feb	Mar	Apr	May	Jun	Jul	Aug	Sep	Oct	Nov	Dec	Year
Record high °F (°C)	71 (22)	75 (24)	88 (31)	92 (33)	99 (37)	106 (41)	109 (43)	107 (42)	105 (41)	93 (34)	83 (28)	73 (23)	109 (43)
Mean daily maximum °F (°C)	34.0 (1.1)	38.8 (3.8)	49.9 (9.9)	62.8 (17.1)	73.0 (22.8)	81.6 (27.6)	84.4 (29.1)	83.0 (28.3)	77.7 (25.4)	65.5 (18.6)	50.8 (10.4)	38.8 (3.8)	61.7 (16.5)
Daily mean °F (°C)	25.3 (−3.7)	29.3 (−1.5)	39.5 (4.2)	51.4 (10.8)	62.1 (16.7)	71.2 (21.8)	74.1 (23.4)	72.3 (22.4)	65.8 (18.8)	54.1 (12.3)	41.0 (5.0)	30.6 (−0.8)	51.4 (10.8)
Mean daily minimum °F (°C)	16.6 (−8.6)	19.9 (−6.7)	29.1 (−1.6)	40.0 (4.4)	51.2 (10.7)	60.7 (15.9)	63.8 (17.7)	61.7 (16.5)	53.8 (12.1)	42.6 (5.9)	31.2 (−0.4)	22.5 (−5.3)	41.1 (5.1)
Record low °F (°C)	−23 (−31)	−21 (−29)	−8 (−22)	17 (−8)	27 (−3)	33 (1)	45 (7)	39 (4)	24 (−4)	15 (−9)	−6 (−21)	−22 (−30)	−23 (−31)
Average precipitation inches (mm)	2.81 (71)	2.33 (59)	3.00 (76)	4.94 (125)	4.17 (106)	5.02 (128)	3.83 (97)	3.57 (91)	2.94 (75)	3.62 (92)	3.66 (93)	2.85 (72)	42.74 (1,086)
Average snowfall inches (cm)	8.6 (22)	3.6 (9.1)	2.0 (5.1)	0.3 (0.76)	0.0 (0.0)	0.0 (0.0)	0.0 (0.0)	0.0 (0.0)	0.0 (0.0)	0.0 (0.0)	0.6 (1.5)	4.0 (10)	19.1 (49)
Average precipitation days (≥ 0.01 in)	9.7	8.8	9.8	11.2	12.0	9.6	8.5	7.6	6.8	8.7	9.1	9.8	111.6
Average snowy days (≥ 0.1 in)	4.5	3.4	1.4	0.2	0.0	0.0	0.0	0.0	0.0	0.0	0.7	2.4	12.6
Source: NOAA

== Demographics ==
Historical population
Census	Pop.	Note	%±
1860	1,930		—
1870	3,057		58.4%
1880	4,373		43.0%
1890	4,996		14.2%
1900	6,105		22.2%
1910	7,664		25.5%
1920	7,985		4.2%
1930	8,781		10.0%
1940	9,281		5.7%
1950	9,460		1.9%
1960	9,823		3.8%
1970	9,971		1.5%
1980	9,885		−0.9%
1990	8,987		−9.1%
2000	9,077		1.0%
2010	8,837		−2.6%
2020	8,291		−6.2%
U.S. Decennial Census

=== 2020 census ===
As of the 2020 census, Paris had a population of 8,291. There were 2,576 families residing in the city, and the population density was 1,368.15 inhabitants per square mile (528.25/km^{2}). The median age was 43.0 years. 21.2% of residents were under the age of 18 and 21.5% of residents were 65 years of age or older. For every 100 females there were 91.9 males, and for every 100 females age 18 and over there were 90.4 males age 18 and over.

97.1% of residents lived in urban areas, while 2.9% lived in rural areas.

There were 3,663 households in Paris, of which 25.8% had children under the age of 18 living in them. Of all households, 37.7% were married-couple households, 21.1% were households with a male householder and no spouse or partner present, and 32.3% were households with a female householder and no spouse or partner present. About 36.7% of all households were made up of individuals and 17.2% had someone living alone who was 65 years of age or older.

There were 4,185 housing units, of which 12.5% were vacant. The homeowner vacancy rate was 3.3% and the rental vacancy rate was 12.0%.

Racial composition as of the 2020 census
Race	Number	Percent
White	7,886	95.1%
Black or African American	45	0.5%
American Indian and Alaska Native	20	0.2%
Asian	42	0.5%
Native Hawaiian and Other Pacific Islander	0	0.0%
Some other race	67	0.8%
Two or more races	231	2.8%
Hispanic or Latino (of any race)	150	1.8%

=== Income and poverty ===
The median income for a household in the city was $42,446, and the median income for a family was $49,612. Males had a median income of $38,295 versus $25,250 for females. The per capita income for the city was $24,984. About 12.1% of families and 14.1% of the population were below the poverty line, including 18.9% of those under age 18 and 8.2% of those age 65 or over.

== Sports ==
Teams include:

- Paris Lakers, minor league baseball team from 1950 to 1959
- Paris Parisians (Eastern Illinois League), semi-pro baseball team

== Education ==
Paris has two public school districts: Paris Union School District 95 (for those living inside city limits) and Paris Community Unit School District No. 4 (for those outside the city limits). Those in District 95 send their children to Mayo Middle School, while Unit 4 children attend Crestwood School. Both schools feed into one high school, Paris High School, which until 2009 was under District 95. On July 1, 2009, the renamed Paris Cooperative High School became Illinois's first cooperative high school.

Paris was also the home of Saint Mary's School, a Catholic school serving preschool through 8th grade open to children of all religions. St. Mary's was the only tuition-based private school in Paris. St. Mary's School Catholic School closed on May 23, 2018.

== Infrastructure ==
=== Transportation ===
U.S. Route 150 and Illinois State Route 1 pass through Paris. Both Illinois State Route 16 and Illinois State Route 133 have Illinois State Route 1 as their eastern terminus. One railroad passes through town, a Decatur & Eastern Illinois line that goes north to Danville and southeast to Terre Haute, Indiana.

The Edgar County Airport is located north of the city.

=== Fire districts ===
The City of Paris Fire Department is a career fire department ran by the City of Paris The Paris Fire Department is staffed by 9 Firefighters, 3 Captains, and 1 Chief.

== Notable people ==
- Lionel Artis, civil servant
- George W. Bristow, chief justice of the Illinois Supreme Court, lived in Paris
- Shorty Cantlon, race car driver
- Ed Carpenter, race car driver, born in Paris
- Alfred M. Craig, chief justice of the Illinois Supreme Court, born in Paris
- Brett Eldredge, country music singer, born in Paris
- Jack Franklin, pitcher for the Brooklyn Dodgers
- Albert Austin Harding, University of Illinois band director, raised in Paris
- George Hunt, Illinois attorney general
- Griffin Johnson, social media influencer and venture capitalist
- W. H. Lillard, college instructor, headmaster at Tabor Academy, head football coach at Dartmouth College
- Alice Moore McComas (1850–1919), author, editor, lecturer, and reformer
- Richard P. Mills, educator
- Jean Paige, actress
- Troy Porter, plumber and civil rights leader
- Bernie Shively, college football Hall of Fame member and University of Kentucky athletic director
- Benny Shoaff, American race car driver
- Lee Sholem, film and television director, born in Paris
- Abraham L. Stanfield, businessman and politician
- Barbara Stuart, actor, born in Paris
- Tom Sunkel, MLB pitcher, managed the Paris Lakers from 1950 to 1954
- Carl Switzer, actor, best known as "Alfalfa" in the Our Gang film series.
- Harold Switzer, actor, older brother of Carl Switzer
- Bill Van Dyke, outfielder for the Toledo Maumees, St. Louis Browns, and Boston Beaneaters
- Rodney Watson, men's head basketball coach, University of Southern Indiana
- William Zeckendorf, real estate developer
- Erin Hutchison, Former Christian Recording Artist
- Jeannie G. Pool, is an American composer, musicologist, filmmaker, producer, and lecturer.

== See also ==
- Asher Morton Farmstead
- Edgar County Courthouse
- France Hotel
- Paris Carnegie Public Library
- Paris Elks Lodge No. 812 Building
- Pine Grove Community Club
