= List of cemeteries in Tennessee =

This is a list of notable cemeteries in Tennessee.
Entries marked ‡ are cemeteries with notable monuments or burials.

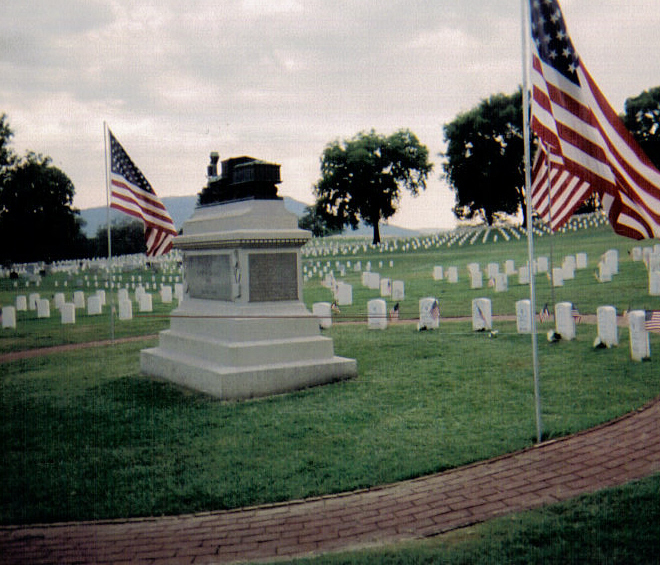
Monument and graves of the Civil War Medal of Honor recipients at Chattanooga National Cemetery

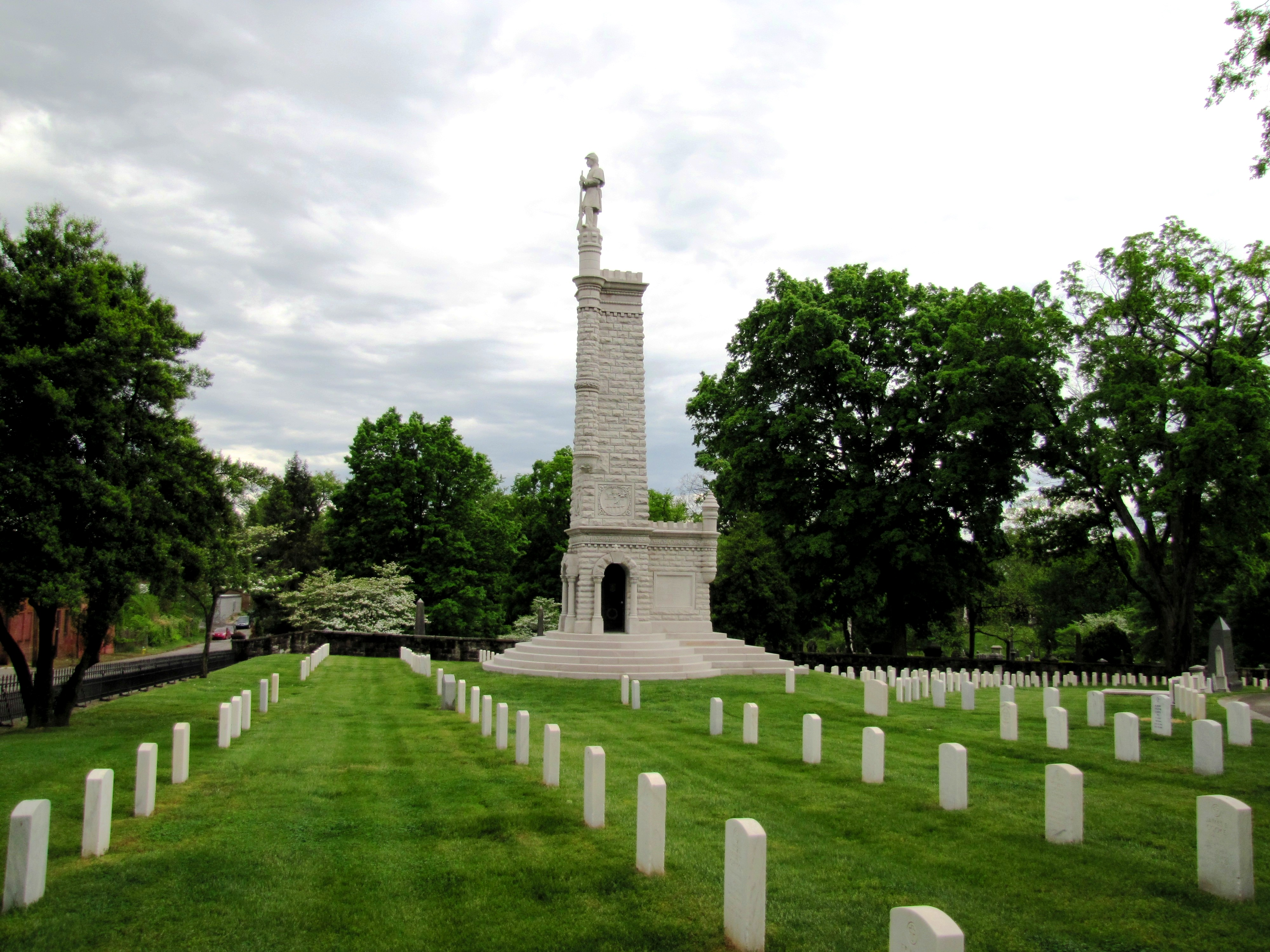
Union Army monument at Knoxville National Cemetery in Knoxville, Tennessee

== East Tennessee ==
- ‡ Andrew Johnson National Cemetery, Greeneville
- Asbury Cemetery, Knoxville
- ‡ Chattanooga National Cemetery, Chattanooga
- Bethesda Presbyterian Church Cemetery, Russellville
- Delap Cemetery, Campbell County
- East Hill Cemetery, Bristol
- First Presbyterian Church Cemetery, Knoxville
- Kelly's Ferry Cemetery, Marion County
- Knoxville National Cemetery, Knoxville
- Lebanon in the Forks Cemetery, Knoxville
- Mountain Home National Cemetery, Johnson City
- Old Gray Cemetery, Knoxville
- Wheat Community African Burial Ground, Oak Ridge

== Middle Tennessee ==
- Cedar Grove Cemetery, Lebanon
- Confederate Cemetery Monument, Farmington
- Evergreen Cemetery, Murfreesboro
- ‡ Forest Lawn Memorial Gardens, Goodlettsville
- Fort Donelson National Cemetery, Dover
- Greenwood Cemetery, Nashville
- Harpeth Hills Memory Gardens, Nashville
- Hendersonville Memory Gardens, Hendersonville
- McGavock Confederate Cemetery, Franklin
- Maplewood Cemetery, Pulaski
- ‡ Mount Olivet Cemetery, Nashville
- Nashville City Cemetery
- Nashville National Cemetery, Madison
- Old Cathey Cemetery, Maury County
- Rest Haven Cemetery, Franklin
- Rest Hill Cemetery, Lebanon
- St Mary's Cemetery, Lawrence County
- ‡ Spring Hill Cemetery, Nashville
- Stones River National Cemetery, Murfreesboro
- Temple Cemetery, Nashville
- Toussaint L'Ouverture County Cemetery, Franklin
- ‡ Woodlawn Memorial Park, Nashville

== West Tennessee ==
- ‡ Calvary Cemetery, Memphis
- ‡ Elmwood Cemetery, Memphis
- Forest Hill Cemetery, Memphis
- ‡ Graceland, Memphis
- ‡ Hollywood Cemetery, Jackson
- ‡ Memorial Park Cemetery, Memphis
- Memphis National Cemetery, Memphis
- Oakland Cemetery, Trenton
- Pleasant Hill Cemetery, Finley
- Riverside Cemetery, Jackson
- Shiloh National Cemetery
- Woodlawn Baptist Church and Cemetery, Nutbush

== See also ==
- List of cemeteries in the United States
