= Delap (disambiguation) =

Delap may refer to:

- Delap, island in the Marshall Islands.
- Delap Cemetery, American historic cemetery
- Delap SDA School, school in Micronesia
- Delaps Cove, Nova Scotia, Canada

== See also ==
- Delap (surname)
