= East Hill Cemetery =

East Hill Cemetery may refer to

- East Hill Cemetery (Tennessee and Virginia), cemetery straddling the Tennessee–Virginia state border
- East Hill Cemetery (Salem, Virginia), cemetery in Salem, Virginia
