= 98th Illinois Infantry Regiment =

98th Regiment Illinois Volunteer Infantry/Illinois Volunteer Mounted Infantry
- Illinois flag
- Active: 1862–1865
- Disbanded: July 29, 1865
- Country: United States
- Allegiance: Union
- Branch: Infantry; Mounted Infantry (1863–1864)
- Equipment: Spencer repeating rifle
- Engagements: Battle of Hoover's Gap; Battle of Chickamauga; Battle of Resaca; Battle of Ladiga

Insignia
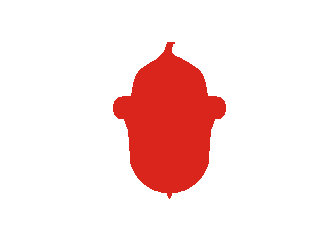
- 1st Division, XIV Corps

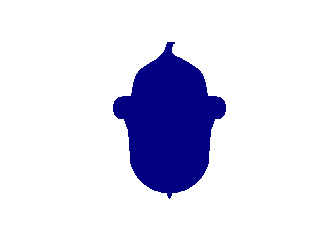
- 4th Division, XIV Corps

The 98th Regiment Illinois Volunteer Infantry, later the 98th Regiment Illinois Volunteer Mounted Infantry, was an infantry and mounted infantry regiment that served in the Union Army during the American Civil War.

== Service ==
After the first year of war and the debacle on the Peninsula caused the Lincoln administration to realize that the war would take longer than first expected and many more men, on July 1, 1862, Lincoln issued a call for 300,000 volunteers for three-year commitments. Illinois’ quota under this call was 26,148. The 98th Illinois Volunteer Infantry was raised in response to this quota. Col. John J. Funkhouser, of Effingham, IL, (Note: The twenty-seven-year-old Funkhouser, had previously served as the A Company commander of the 26th Illinois Infantry Regiment during the ninety-day enlistment.) organized and trained it at Centralia, IL, (Note: Centralia lies roughly 60 miles (97 km)east of St. Louis.) in southern Illinois, during the summer of 1862. He mustered it into federal service on Wednesday, September 3. By this time of the war, Illinois had imported stocks of rifle-muskets from Europe to make up for the shortfalls in the standard Springfields, and the state issued Austrian Rifle Muskets to the 98th Illinois.

=== Initial Deployment ===
In the Western campaigns earlier in 1862, U.S. forces had largely driven organized Confederate forces from Kentucky and large parts of Tennessee. The Tennessee and Cumberland Rivers were now U.S. Navy avenues for logistics and troop movements. The Tennessee state capital, Nashville, the railroad hub at Corinth, and New Orleans, the Confederacy's largest city at that time, were back in federal hands. Vicksburg, on the Mississippi, was now a target for the Union commands, ergo, Confederate Gen. Braxton Bragg decided to divert U.S. attention by invading Kentucky, the most southern of the southern border states, which would occur simultaneously Gen. Lee's invasion of Maryland and Maj. Gen.s Earl Van Dorn's and Sterling Price's attack to regain the rail center at Corinth. Kentucky produced cotton (in west Kentucky) and tobacco on large scale plantations similar to Virginia and North Carolina in the central and western portions of the state with slave labor, and was the primary supplier of hemp for rope used in the cotton industry. The state was also a major slave trade center especially out of Louisville.

Bragg had begun his campaign in August, hoping that he could rally secessionist supporters in Kentucky (similar to Lee in Maryland at the same time) and draw Union forces under Maj. Gen. Don Carlos Buell back to protect the Ohio River. Bragg sent his infantry by rail from Tupelo, MS, to Chattanooga, TN, while his cavalry and artillery moved by road. By moving his army to Chattanooga, he was able to challenge Buell's advance on the city.

On Monday, September 8, Funkhouser received orders to take the 98th Illinois via the Ohio and Mississippi Rail Road to Louisville, KY. At Bridgeport, IL, their train derailed killing eight men and injuring seventy-five. Arriving in Jeffersonville, IN, opposite Louisville the next day, they marched into Camp Jo Holt. Once his forces had assembled in Chattanooga, Bragg then planned to move north into Kentucky in cooperation with Lt. Gen. Edmund Kirby Smith, who was commanding a separate force operating out of Knoxville, Tennessee. In response to Bragg's advances, the 98th remained north of the Ohio River for ten days as part of the defense of Louisville.

Meanwhile, Bragg, advancing to Glasgow, KY, pursued by Buell, Bragg approached Munfordville, a station on the Louisville & Nashville Railroad (L&IRR), about 70 miles (110 km) south of Louisville, and the location of an 1,800 foot long railroad bridge crossing Green River, in mid-September. The 98th Illinois' future commander Col. John T. Wilder, (Note: A New York native, Wilder had relocated to Indiana and owned a foundry there.) commanded the Union garrison at Munfordville, which consisted of three new, raw regiments behind extensive fortifications. After rebuffing the Rebels on September 14 and unaware that Buell was nearing him, Wilder surrendered to Bragg's army on Tuesday, September 16 and became prisoners of war (POWs) for two months.

In response, on Sunday, September 19, the regiment marched 18 miles (29 km) south of Louisville to a blocking position at Shepherdsville. Eleven days later, September 30, they were ordered 90 miles (140 km), via Elizabethtown, to Frankfort to protect the capital. While the 98th Illinois was on the march, Bragg had participated in the inauguration of Richard Hawes as the provisional Confederate governor of Kentucky on Saturday, October 4. The next Wednesday, October 8, the wing of Bragg's army under Maj. Gen. Leonidas Polk met Buell's army at Perryville (60 miles (97 km) southeast of Louisville and 40 miles (64 km) southwest of Lexington) on October 8 and won a tactical victory against him. Despite this result, Bragg ordered his army to retreat through the Cumberland Gap to Knoxville, labeling it a withdrawal and the successful culmination of a giant raid. He had reasons for withdrawing in that news had arrived that Van Dorn and Price had failed at the Second Battle of Corinth, just as Lee had failed at Antietam.

This all occurred while the 98th Illinois were on their 90 miles (140 km) march to Frankfort, where they arrived on Thursday, October 9. Two days later, the regiment, moved 13 miles (21 km) to Versailles taking 200 sick POWs from the Rebel army hospital that they had abandoned. On Monday, the regiment returned to the capital. At this time, the regiment was brigaded in the Col. Abram O. Miller's 40th Brigade, with the 72nd and 75th Indiana, 123rd Illinois, and 13th Indiana Battery in Brig. Gen. Ebenezer Dumont's 12th Division in the Army of the Ohio.

The War Department was disappointed with Buell who although the strategic victor, had lost the battlefield to Bragg at Perryville. As a result of his part in rebuffing the Confederate advamce on Corinth, William S. Rosecrans was given command of XIV Corps (which, because he was also given command of the Department of the Cumberland, would soon be renamed the Army of the Cumberland), on October 24. Rosecrans was promoted to the rank of major general (of volunteers, as opposed to his brigadier rank in the regular army), which was applied retroactively to March 21, 1862, so that he would outrank fellow Maj. Gen. Thomas who had earlier been offered Buell's command, but turned it down out of loyalty to Buell. (Note: Meanwhile, Maj. Gen. Grant was not unhappy that Rosecrans was leaving his command as the rift between them continued to grow.) Rosecrans soon became popular with his men as "Old Rosy and began organizing his army.

Two days after Rosecrans took command, Sunday, October 26, the 450th Brigade marched out of Frankfort for Bowling Green. Their route took them southwest via Bardstown, Mumfordsville, and Glasgow, to Bowling Green. The brigade, averaging 15 miles (24 km) per day, completed the roughly 130 miles (210 km) on Monday, November 3. A week later, November 10, the 98th Illinois' brigade moved with its division to Scottsville. Roughly two weeks later, Tuesday, November 25, the division moved into Tennessee to Gallatin, and on Friday, November 28, to Castalian Springs. Two weeks and two days later, Sunday, December 14, the regiment moved to Bledsoe Creek. On 22 December 1862 in Gallatin, Col. Wilder, who with his regiment had ended parole mid-November, took command of the 40th Brigade which at that time consisted of the 98th and 123rd Illinois Infantry Regiments, the 17th, 72nd, and 75th Indiana Infantry Regiments, and the 18th Indiana Battery of Light Artillery. Maj. Gen. Reynolds took command of the 12th Division on Tuesday, December 23.

The 98th Illinois was now with its most famous brigade commander. Wilder's initial combat mission was to pursue another of Morgan's raids into Kentucky intended to sever the Army of the Cumberland's primary supply line. Lacking sufficient cavalry to screen his army as he moved south toward what would be the Battle of Stones River as part of the Stones River Campaign, Rosecrans again had to use infantry to chase off Morgan. He tasked Rewynolds to use his infantry brigades for this mission. Trying to speed their movement, these infantry units deployed partially by rail. Wilder also unsuccessfully tried to replicate the use of mule-drawn wagons with the addition of men mounting the mules pulling the wagons. Unfortunately, they still traveled the majority of the pursuit on foot over unpaved roads. Despite the use of rail and wagons to speed up the pursuit, the mission was a failure with Morgan's command escaping at the Rolling Fork River. The difference in speed between cavalry and infantry made the pursuit near impossible. On Boxing Day, December 26, Wilder's brigade had marched northward after Morgan, arriving Wednesday, New Year's Eve, December 31, at Glasgow.

=== Mounted infantry ===
On Friday, January 2, 1863, the 989th and its brigade marched to Cave City, and, on Sunday, the regiment's division took the Louisville and Nashville Railroad (L7NRR) 78 miles (126 km) to Nashville. After detraining, the division with the 98th Illinois, marched the 30 miles (48 km) to join the Army of the Cumberland (AoC) in camp by the Stones River battlefield by Murfreesboro which they reached at dusk on Tuesday, January 6. The army was recovering from the battle there and resupplying and drilling. Rosecrans reorganized the army further and 12th Division became the 5th Division of Maj. Gen. Thomas' Center Corps and the 40th Brigade became the 2nd Brigade in that division and once again commanded by Col. Miller. Eight days later, a further reorganization renumbered it as the 1st Division and added the 123rd Illinois to the brigade, again commanded by Wilder. On Saturday, January 24, moved through Bradyville, and, on 25th, returned.

Despite the AoC's victory at Murfreesboro, the war in its area of operations (AOR) was still hanging in the balance. It was still struggling with Bragg's Confederate Army of Tennessee to control Tennessee and all its valuable resources and strategic rail interchanges. Strategically important, Tennessee had Union loyalists in its east that Lincoln wanted to liberate and bring back under Federal protection. It also was a critical rail link between Virginia and the west of the Confederacy that supplied Rebel forces in Tennessee and throughout the Eastern Theater. The state also produced food and mineral supplies for the war effort.

After Stones River, while he rested and reorganized his AoC, Rosecrans, pushed back against the War Department's pressure to begin a spring offensive against the Rebels. One of his reasons was a deficiency in cavalry as the Rebels had twice as much. Moving further south and east in Tennessee would further lengthen his already lengthy supply lines, which were already being raided by Confederate cavalry. With good reason therefore, he pestered Washington for more cavalry yet the War Department mistakenly saw his requests as an excuse to not move. The failure to capture Morgan and other mounted Confederate raiders had shown Rosecrans had legitimate reasons to ask for more cavalry. After Washington's denial of more cavalry, Rosecrans and his subordinates, with Wilder very involved in the discussion, tried to find a solution. The experiment with wagons from the October events was revisited and analyzed, and it became apparent that the solution to their problems was the early role of dragoons as mounted infantrymen. Rosecrans thought an infantry brigade mounted on horseback and armed with more firepower than an ordinary brigade might be a solution. This was how the 98th Illinois and Wilder's brigade acquired horses and repeating rifles.

Several times, Rosecrans wrote to the Union General-in-Chief Maj. Gen. Halleck stating his desire to convert or establish units of mounted infantry and asking for authorization to purchase or issue enough tack to outfit 5,000 mounted infantry. He also believed, with Wilder in agreement, that he needed to outfit all of his cavalry with repeating weapons. When he felt he was not being heard, he went over Halleck directly to War Secretary Edward M Stanton.

In Wilder, an innovative and creative man, Rosecrans found an eager acolyte for mounted infantry as a solution. On Monday, February 16, Rosecrans authorized Wilder to mount his brigade. The regiments also voted on whether to convert to mounted infantry. Col. Funkhouser and his men voted for the transition possibly motivated by the frustration of never catching the Rebel raiders when they attacked. The 17th and 72nd Indiana also wanted to transition, but the 75th Indiana voted against the change. The 123rd Illinois who had wanted to become mounted infantry transferred from the 1st Brigade of the 5th Division of XIV Corps to replace them. In addition, the brigade's artillery battery, the 18th Independent Battery Indiana Light Artillery under the future pharmaceutical giant and benefactor of Purdue, CAPT Eli Lily, had ten artillery pieces, six 3-inch Ordnance Rifle pulled by eight horses each and four mountain howitzers pulleed by two mules each. This gave the brigade increased artillery firepower.

==== Finding mounts ====
Throughout February and March 1863, Wilder started a lengthy process of sweeping the Tennessee countryside to round up enough mounts for his entire brigade Instead of getting mounts sent on from federal remount agencies, the 98th Illionois and its brigade mates obtained them from the countryside. Fairly early in the process, the obstinacy of the mules led to horses becoming the priority. Moving out from Murfreesboro, the 98th Illinois' patrols combed the local civilian population and confiscated horses and mules for their purposes. Early efforts yielded horses not meeting army standards, but needing them for transport and not charges, the men were not picky taking what they found. The government's policy of quartermasters giving receipts was ignored as horses and mules were frequently seized as contraband. Wilder boasted that it did “not cost the Government one dollar to mount my men.” The 18th Illinois regiment was ordered to mount its men on Sunday, March 8. By the following Saturday, March 14, the regiment had 350 men mounted. Shortly afterward the whole Brigade was mounted.

In theory and in practice, the 98th Illinois would ride their horses to travel rapidly to contact, but upon engagement, fight dismounted. The horses and mules required saddles, tack, feed bags, grooming equipment, and farrier support, which the men either purchased locally or took from captured or confiscated stocks. The increase in the size of the brigade's supply train led to a further increase in the number of wagons, mules, and horses to support the brigade. The 98th Illinois and its brigade mates began training with their horses. Wilder, Funkhouser, the other regimental commanders, and their staffs next focused on developing new tactics. They adapted concepts from the cavalry and the infantry in their tactics and standard procedures. They developed a transition movement from horseback to forming infantry line of battle. To facilitate this they took the standard cavalry one horse holder for to three men in the battle line from the cavalry. This training ran concurrently with the constant forage expeditions and search for better mounts and tack from the countryside. The 98th was lucky in having been mounted most of the month and by the end of March, most of the brigade was mounted, and Wilder, Funkhouser et al. could begin plan for the primary purpose of countering Confederate regular and irregular raids on the AoC's supply lines. Their resulting speed of deployment, earned the brigade the nickname, "The Lightning Brigade." The regiment and its mates would prove the validity of its conversion in the campaign in the Western theater. (Note: The brigade was also sometimes known as the "Hatchet Brigade" because they received long-handled hatchets to carry instead of cavalry sabers.)

==== Finding a suitable weapon ====
As well as mounting the command for faster deployment, Wilder felt that muzzle-loaded rifles were too difficult to use when traveling on horseback. Like Rosecrans, he also believed that the superiority of repeating rifles was worth their price in return for the great increase in firepower. The repeating rifles also had the standoff range like the standard infantry Lorenzes, Springfields, and Enfields in use by the Army of the Cumberland. Wilder felt the repeating and breech loading carbines in use by the Federal cavalry lacked the accuracy at long range that his brigade would need.

While Rosecrans looked at the five-shot Colt revolving rifle that would equip other units in the Army of the Cumberland (particularly seeing action with the 21st Ohio Volunteer Infantry Union forces at Snodgrass Hill during the Battle of Chickamauga), Wilder was initially opting for the Henry repeating rifle as the proper weapon to arm his brigade. In early March, Wilder arranged a proposal for New Haven Arms Company (which later became famous as Winchester Repeating Arms) to supply his brigade with the sixteen-shot Henry if the soldiers paid for the weapons out of pocket. He had received backing from banks in Indiana on loans to be signed by each soldier and cosigned by Wilder, but New Haven could make a deal with Wilder despite the financing.

Into this void stepped by Christopher Spencer. After attending a promotional demonstration for the Army of the Cumberland of his Model 1860 Spencer Army rifle, after which Wilder found the Spencer "capable of firing a shot without drawing on the magazine, which held seven cartridges; the rifle carried an ounce bullet of .52 caliber in copper cartridge, and had a bayonet, and was a most formidable weapon, especially at short range, and would carry with accuracy a half mile." He decided to cease pursuit of Henry rifles, and proposed the Henry arrangement to Spencer. Spencer agreed and got the Ordnance Department to send a shipment to the Army of the Cumberland. The shipment armed all men of the brigade, as well as several other units in the AoC.

The regiment's new weapon used a tubular magazine in the butt stock, fitted with a coil spring and holding seven Spencer rimfire cartridges that fed into the breech allowing the user to fire as quickly as they could work the lever action. This rifle's increase in firepower would quickly make it one of the most effective weapons in the Civil War. With new mounts and new weapons, the brigade worked out new tactics. Alongside the Army of the Cumberland's other mounted infantry units, Wilder developed new training and tactics through March and June 1863. While awaiting the Spencers, Wilder sent the regiments out as part of their training. On Wednesday, April 1, the 98th Illinois moved out on an eight days' scout, going to Rome, Lebanon and Snow's Hill before returning to Murfreesboro the Tursday of the next week. After a three-day stay in camp, on Monday, April 13, the regiment moved with the brigade moved to Lavergne and Franklin, and returned the next day. The following Monday, April 20, the brigade, with the 98th Illinois, moved to McMinnville where it destroyed a cotton factory and captured a railroad train. On Wednesday anmd Thursday, the regiment and its brigade, moved via Liberty to Alexandria where it joined its parent command, Reynold's 4th Division on April 23. Monday, April 27, saw the brigade move to Lebanon where it captured a large number of horses and mules and by Wednesday, April 29, it returned to Murfreesboro.

==== Developing training and tactics ====
During the months of April and May, the regiment made three weekly brigade sorties from the brigade's Murfreesboro base. The patrols were combined raids on Confederate cavalry operating nearby, the destruction of Confederate supplies, and further foraging for horses, food, and material (mainly saddles and tack). On Wednesday, April 1, the 98th Illinois moved out with the brigade on an eight days' scout, going to Rome, Lebanon and Snow's Hill, (Note: The brigade’s other three regiments and the battery made contact elements of regular Rebel cavalry, but no decisive battle occurred, and both units left the town. Wilder had planned to cut off the enemy, but the Confederates retreated before the brigade could complete any encirclement.) and returned the following Thursday, April 9. The next week, on Monday, April 13, the brigade rode to Lavergne and Franklin, and returned the next day, Tuesday without enemy contact made by the regiment nor any command in the brigade. The following Monday, April 20, the 98th Illinois was on the road with the brigade. Rosecrans had ordered a larger operation to McMinnville to destroy the enemy cavalry and destroy their stores of resources used to conduct their raids. Rosecrans told both Brig. Stanley, his cavalry corps commander, and Reynolds, the 18th Illinois' 5th Division commander that they had command of Wilder's 2nd Brigade. The 98th Illinois and other brigade units worked closely with Col Long’s Cavalry brigade, while the unmounted 75th Indiana operated with Reynolds' other regular infantry. On Tuesday, U.S. units entered McMinnville, occupied by pickets of Morgan's Brigade with both sides claiming the other left the field. Rosecrans clearly stated that he wanted the force to engage and destroy the Rebel cavalry, but this was not accomplished. Reynolds and Wilder were successful in sacking the town and its stores of supplies. Wilder destroyed or captured the train depot, 600 blankets, several thousand pounds of bacon, 200 bales of cotton, a cotton factory, two mills, the courthouse, some private homes. He also captured 200 prisoners, and a railroad train. All three sorties generally failed to decisively engage or deter Confederate cavalry forces, aside from temporarily driving them from the various towns. On the second and third tasks, the brigade performed very well.

Of the three missions given to the brigade on the three sorties, pursuit and destruction of the enemy was the most difficult and dangerous especially with three of the regiments still untested in combat while the other two, destroying/confiscating supplies/resources and rounding up horses and tack were easier in comparison. Whatever the reason, Wilder focused on the latter two and complied with that portion of Rosecrans’ orders. In addition to the destruction in McMinnville noted above, Wilder went back to Murfreesboro with 678 horses and mules. The contradicting commands to Long and Reynolds may have played a role in the failure to destroy the enemy in McMinnville. A soldier in Reynolds' infantry wrote that they did not pursue the Confederates was that “...the officer in command of the advance would not allow the men to go ahead of him in pursuit...” and Reynolds admitted in his after-action report that he did not allow a pursuit due to the exhaustion of his men and horses.

After nine days, the division returned to Murfreesboro entering and dismounting on Wednesday, April 29. A week later, May 6, the 75th Indiana exchanged places in the 1st Brigade of the 4th Division with the 123rd Illinois who immediately began the mounting process. Combat veterans like the 17th Indiana had seen combat, the 123rd Illinois had fought at the Battle of Perryville, where 36 men were killed in action and 180 wounded. The men of the untested 72nd Indiana and 98th Illinois still had yet to prove themselves on the battlefield and trained hard to be ready when called upon. Throughout the month, the 98th and the other regiments went out on foraging expeditions to find horses and equipment for the 123rd Illinois as well as upgrading their own horses and gear. By mid-May, the AoC's shipment of Spencers arrived, and the brigade was fully engaged in learning to maintain and shoot the new rifles. On May 23, Funkhouser took the 98th Illinois on a reconnaissance to the McMinnville and Manchester Railroad (M&MRR) front, making contact with the enemy's pickets, killing two and wounding four. At the end of the month, Sunday, May 31, the 98th Illinois officially exchanged their Austrian Lorenz rifle-muskets for their new Spencers.

Armed with their new rifles, the 98th joined a brigade-level scouting/raid mission in June back to Liberty on Monday, June 4. There they attacked two regiments of Brig. Gen. Wharton’s cavalry, the 1st Kentucky and 11th Texas. Lasting Monday evening into Tuesday, June 5, the 98th Illinois and its brigade drove them out of town and captured 20 prisoners and five wagons.

By mid-June, the brigade had had a chance to try out its new capabilities against the enemy. By then, all the Spencers had been issued, and the men had familiarized themselves with it. The 98th Illinois soldiers and their brigade mates soon realized the advantages the breech-loading repeating rifle held over the muzzleloader, and they exuded confidence in themselves, their leaders, their new tactics, and their treasured new weapons. The bulk of the logistical effort to mount everyone was complete, although throughout the summer the 98th Illinois like the other mounted infantry would continually seek to find better horses than the one they were riding.

As Rosecrans now began setting up for his awaited spring offensive, his AoC now had a lethal, mobile strike force to stop Confederate raiders, however, Rosecrans instead used the 98th Illinois and its brigade mates in the cavalry mission as raiders. From Wilder's own reports, he deemed this mission to be his primary goal while glossing over his opportunities to deal a serious blow to any Confederate cavalry force, a fundamental shift from the mounted infantry's initial primary purpose, protecting supply lines by stopping Confederate cavalry raids.

On Wednesday, June 10, the 98th Illinois attacked the enemy at Liberty, driving their rear guard of 150 men to Snow's Hill. In preparation for his upcoming campaign, Rosecrans sent Wilder's brigade, Tuesday, June 16, to Dark Bend.

By the middle of June, the 98th Illinois had completely transformed from infantry afoot to mounted infantry.The regiment was highly mobile and working well as mounted infantry. Every man was mounted and had all equine paraphernalia necessary. The regiment's members had gradually learned the complicated drill necessary for horse units, how to pack for long expeditions, and how to care for their animals. The same applied to the brigade as a whole. A down side to the transition to horseback, however, increased the required quantity need for food, new horses, and supplies to operate. Constant foraging for feed and the soldiers continual effort to better their equipment and mounts left a trail everywhere the brigade went. The 98th Illinois and the rest of the brigade had changed greatly from how they were when Wilder took command the prior December 1862. The 98th Illinois' skirmishes with Rebel cavalry led the men to feel equal to at least twice or thrice their number of men armed with muzzle-loading guns.

The 2nd Brigade's new mobility gave Rosecrans and his subordinates a capability to send the brigade to a crucial point on a battlefield much more rapidly than regular infantry. Rosecrans could react to a developing battle situation more quickly with mounted infantry. The 98th Illinois’ and its colleagues’ Spencers were only slightly out-ranged by the regular infantry's rifle-muskets contrary to the equally highly mobile cavalry whose carbines were outranged by infantry armed with modern rifle-muskets. The 98th Illinois and the rest of Wilder's brigade's increase in firepower was deemed to more than compensate for the slightly shorter range. The new, improved capabilities of the still untested 98th Illinois and 72nd Indiana plus the combat proven 123rd Illinois and 17th Indiana would soon be tested.

=== The Tullahoma campaign ===
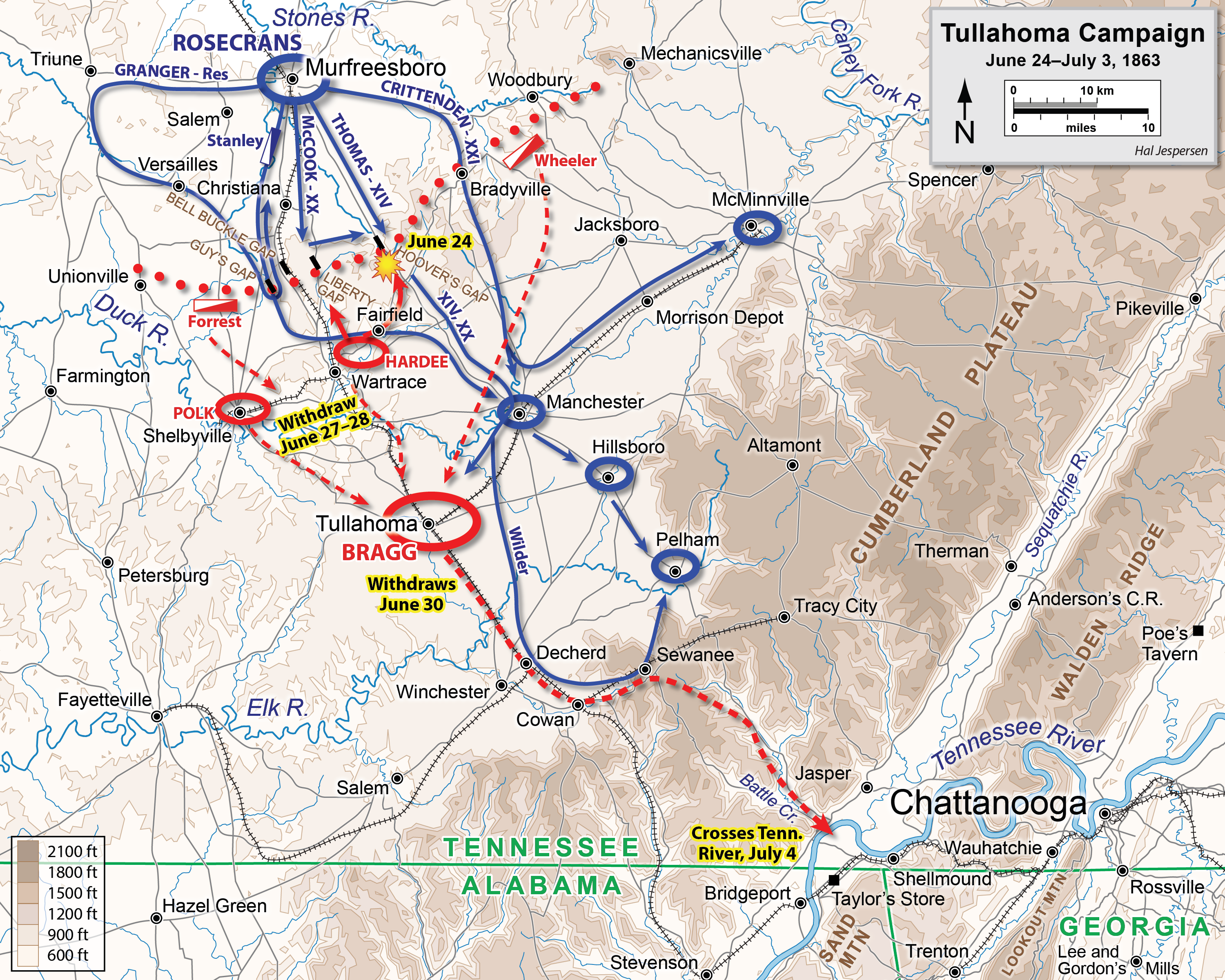
Tullahoma campaign Confederate Union

On June 2, Halleck telegraphed Rosecrans threatening to send some of his troops to support Grant if he did not move on Bragg. After polling his subordinates, he pushed back. On Tuesday, June 16, Halleck gave an ultimatum demanding an immediate movement forward. When Rosecrans responded that the AoC would be moving within five days, Halleck relented.

On Tuesday, June 23, Rosecrans deployed forces to feign an attack on Shelbyville while massing forces against Bragg's right. His troops moved out toward Liberty, Bellbuckle, and Hoover's Gaps through the Highland Rim (near Beechgrove, Tennessee). Early on Wednesday morning, Rosecrans reported that the Army of the Cumberland had begun to move against Bragg. That morning at 3:00 a.m., in pouring rain that would persist for 17 days, the 98th Illinois moved out from Murfreesboro on the macadamized Manchester Pike as part of Wilder's spearhead for Reynolds’ division in Thomas’ corps. and made for Hoover's Gap. The brigade showed the advantage of their speed despite the weather by reaching the gap nearly 9 miles (14 km) ahead of Thomas's main body.

==== Hoover's Gap ====
The 98th Illinois' destination, Hoover's Gap, was the furthest east of a series in the rugged hills southeast between Murfreesboro and Chattanooga. (Note: From west to east they were Guy's Gap to the far west, Bellbuckle Gap, Liberty Gap, and Hoover's.) It was a 7 miles (11 km) long route that snaked through hills with tops at 1,100 feet (340 m) Col. James Connolly, commander of the 123rd Illinois, noted the 4 miles (6.4 km) section through the steepest hills pass was only wide enough to let two wagons pass each other. The valley had wooded hills, thickly grown with underbrush and briers, making it impracticable for cavalry. The Manchester Pike, a good, macadamized road, wound through this narrow pass following the little brook, one of the headwaters of Stone's River. Because Bragg expected Rosecrans to use the wider mountain passes, he left Hoover's Gap lightly defended. The AoC had received intelligence that although Bragg had prepared strong entrenchments in Hoover's Gap, but only posted a single cavalry regiment in the gap. Intelligence had reported that Bate's brigade of Stewart's division was posted in the valley below the gap 2 miles (3.2 km) to the east of Garrison Fork, about 3 miles (4.8 km) southwest of Beech Grove.

On the march down Manchester Pike toward Hoover's Gap, the 72nd Indiana led the 1,500 man brigade with the 123rd Illinois bringing up the rear, and the 98th Illinois in the van of the column with the 17th Indiana and Lilly's battery. As the mounted infantrymen trotted down the macadam and the deep mud on the shoulders, every ear in the silent column strained to catch the slightest sound of musketry indicating contact with the enemy. Before daybreak, very heavy rain began falling, and a fog enveloped the advance through the forests with the only sounds coming from horses in the mud and the pattering of rain on the ponchos. A few miles past the outermost AoC pickets, the brigade's scouts made contact with Rebel mounted vedettes. The few shots followed by the sound of horses and then a quick burst of gunfire caused the men to focus on the road ahead and increased the gait to as rapid a walk as the road and rain allowed.

The brigade’s advance guard who had charged the enemy pickets at a gallop in a column of fours, surprised and dispersed the Confederate 1st Kentucky Cavalry who were in bivouac at the gap, routing them in disorder, without even time to saddle or mount their horses, and the brigade pushed on through the gap, and not even a scout or messenger of the enemy being ahead of us to give the alarm to the enemy's infantry, under General Bate, supposed to be at the summit of the gap, where the turnpike descends to the valley of the Garrison fork of Duck River, running west at right angles to the line of Hoover's Gap.

After this initial contact, Wilder decided to surprise the enemy if possible, by a rapid march, and make a bold dash seize the entrenchments reported at the highest crests midway through the gap.. The 98th Illinois lined up on the right flank as the brigade drove the 1st Kentucky ahead of them. The regiment and its mates reached the narrow part of the gap at 12:00 p.m

Wilder was quickly on the scene. The 98th Illinois and its comrades were surprised to find the lines of entrenchments at the hill crests empty save a cannon the fleeing 1st Kentucky had abandoned Brigade scouts soon reported the only other Confederate units nearby were the 3rd Confederate Cavalry at Garrison's Fork 1 mile (1.6 km) from the southern exit, and as reported earlier, Bate’s infantry brigade 2 miles (3.2 km) away near Beech Grove. Looking down the valley to Beech Grove, the men could see the tents of a cavalry encampment and further to the west, down the valley of the Garrison Fork Bate’s infantry camp.

The scouts also reported the remainder of the 1st Kentucky Cavalry were rapidly fleeing their position on the Duck River just south of the gap. Despite Reynolds’ orders to fall back to his infantry, which was still 6 miles (9.7 km) away, Wilder recognized an opportunity and decided "to take the entire gap, and if possible, hold it until the arrival of the infantry column."

The mounted infantrymen galloped through the pass as the Rebels fled before them. The 98th Illinois found the Spencers taking a substantial toll on the Confederates. The increased firepower combined with the mounted transport meant that the brigade's advance was so swift that the 1st Kentucky Cavalry could organize little resistance with its rearguard loading their muzzle loading Enfield rifle-muskets while riding yet stopping to dismount fire their Enfields across their saddles at the oncoming 98th Illinois and its brethren. Having to repeat this evolution every time they wanted to fire, by the south end of the gap, only five or six men remained were left to slow a whole brigade of infantry hard on their heels. Col. Connolly wrote that it was "a mad race of pursuers and pursued [chasing] down that Tennessee road through mud and rain until exhausted horses and men were glad to stop, but not until we...raced after the enemy through the formidable Hoover's Gap and seized it as our own."

While the 98th Illinois was clearing the advance on the right flank, the brigade’s center pushed on beyond the southern end of the gap to McBride's Creek, capturing some wagons and cattle. On reaching the terminus of the gap, Wilder established a defensive position to prevent the Confederates from retaking the gap. Wilder then sent word to Reynolds that he could and would hold the gap until Reynolds could bring up the infantry. From the heights at the southern end, the 98th Illinois and its comrades could see division-sized Rebel encampments in the distance. As the 98th and 123rd Illinois and 17th Indiana were spreading to cover the exit, elements of the 72nd Indiana had chased the 1st Kentucky into Beech Grove and put the cavalry there to flight as well.

Wilder dismounted his troops and prepared to hold the gap despite Reynolds’ orders to retreat. Eight companies of the 98th Illinois and six companies of the 17th Indiana were kept in reserve with one section of Rodmans and one section of the mountain howitzers. The other two companies of the 98th Illinois entrenched on the east side of the Manchester Pike to secure the brigade's left. The 72nd Indiana entrenched with its left across the pike from the two 98th Illinois companies with one section of the mountain howitzers while its Companies H and E manned the brigade’s picket line far forward in Beech Grove. To its right, Wilder put two sections of the Rodmans on a hill in the center of the line, supported by the 123rd Illinois on either side. The infantrymen were in a hollow screened from view of Rebel scouts by a crest at their front that left Lilly’s guns and staff officers the only visible U.S. forces to Bate’s approaching force. On his right, he put four companies of the 17th Indiana on a high wooded hill .25 miles (400 m) south of the gap on the brigade's right flank, determined to hold its position. Wilder sent word back 10 miles (16 km) to the infantrymen following his brigade, their movement slowed by the limited macadamized surface and the mud off of it, to hurry forward. The 98th Illinois and its comrades, despite fatigue, trusted their Spencers to enable them to prevail over any rebel attacks as they sent their horses to the rear and awaited battle. Unknown to Wilder, it would be some time before Bate responded because as yet he was unaware of Wilder's presence.

Although Bate was closest to Hoover's Gap, retreating Confederate cavalry rode past his position without alerting him to the U. S. army's presence. Instead, the Kentucky troopers rode on to the divisional commander, Stewart, a further 1 mile (1.6 km) west at Fairfield (and roughly 5 miles (8.0 km) from the gap's southern entrance). At 2:00 p.m., couriers from Stewart reached Bate and directed him to send two regiments and a battery up Garrison's Fork toward Beech Grove to advance on Hoover's Gap. Stewart also ordered Johnson's brigade to be ready to move to Bate's assistance if necessary.

Bate immediately sent out skirmishers to reinforce his pickets and began to organize his brigade, but he was hampered by the fact that many of his officers were attending a Masonic picnic. He soon had the drums in his camp beating to call his men to arms. These drums were soon heard by men from 72nd Indiana’s Companies H and E on the picket line and foraging in the abandoned cavalry camp (as well as by the 98th Illinois and the rest of the brigade manning their defenses) who realized these Confederates were now behind them on their right. Encouraged by increasing Rebel musketry and artillery, these men quickly hastened back to the gap. Bate's advancing skirmishers soon cut off their direct line of retreat and artillery began to fire on them. This forced a move to the northeast out of contact, but here their horses gave them the mobility to loop back to the west and rejoin their regiment at the southern entrance to the gap.

As he was gathering his men, Bate reported, "The command had not passed the confines of my camp before meeting in scattered remnants a part of the 1st Kentucky Cavalry in hot haste, stating that while on picket they had been scattered and driven from beyond Hoover's Gap by the advancing columns of the enemy." After traveling 1 mile (1.6 km), Bate met the 1st Kentucky’s Col. Butler who reported that three regiments of Northern cavalry had passed down the Manchester Pike and would guide him back. Bate immediately sent back orders for the rest of his brigade to come up.

Bate moved towards Hoover's Gap, guided by the 1st Kentucky Cavalry’s Butler. Bate's direction of advance paralleled Wilder's line of battle, with the high ground on his left. Moving northeast to push back what he still thought was Federal cavalry, Bate detached two of his regiments to move along lateral roads to protect his flanks, . and continued toward the gap with three of his five regiments (700 men). As he approached Hoover's Gap, the pickets began to skirmish.

Both Wilder and Bate perceived threats to their flanks. Wilder, whose line faced south, saw the Rebels advancing from his right (west) and pulled the 98th Illinois and his reserve artillery up to extend his right. Bate, who was advancing generally east, saw Wilder's men in the hills on his left front (north), and placed the 58th Alabama to anchor his left flank in response. To secure his right, he placed the 15th and 37th Tennessee between the Garrison Fork and the Manchester Pike.

Starting at 3:30 p.m., Bate launched his attack to dislodge Wilder. At first sight of the Rebels, Lilly’s mountain howitzers opened fire and a duel between Lil;ly’s guns and Confederate batteries began. Rebel artillery killed two of Lilly's men and the horses from one of the mountain howitzers, but Lilly's battery returned fire effectively and forced the Confederate artillery to reposition.

Bate aimed his first of three thrusts at Lilly’s sections that appeared unsupported on the hill to the left of the Manchester Pike. Meanwhile, Bate ordered the 20th Tennessee to charge Lilly’s two sections on the hill amid the 123rd Illinois. As the Rebels climbed firing their muzzleloaders, the 123rd Illinois soldiers leapt from cover and charged over the crest and opened “a cautious and deliberate fire” on them with their fast-firing Spencers. Expecting an eventual lull in the firing for reloading, the Rebels kept pressing forward into the overwhelming firepower of the 123rd Illinois. Soon the Confederates were forward enough so that the 72nd Indiana caught them in a crossfire on their right flank stopping their momentum and sending them back down the hill.

After regrouping his forces, Bate launched the 20th Tennessee again along with the 37th Georgia back up the hill at Lilly’s battery. While the 98th Illinois and 17th Indiana looked on to their front left, ready to join in if needed, their brother regiments, now firm believers in their Spencers, drove the two Rebel regiments back down the hill again. Bate’s attacks while determined, were piecemeal attacks that wilted under the heavy fire from Wilder's Spencers in the hour-long engagement

Colonel James Connolly, commander of the 123rd Illinois, wrote:

As soon as the enemy opened on us with their artillery we dismounted and formed line of battle on a hill just at the south entrance to the "Gap," and our battery of light artillery was opened on them, a courier was dispatched to the rear to hurry up reinforcements, our horses were sent back some distance out of the way of bursting shells, our regiment was assigned to support the battery, the other three regiments were properly disposed, and not a moment too soon, for these preparations were scarcely completed when the enemy opened on us a terrific fire of shot and shell from five different points, and their masses of infantry, with flags flying, moved out of the woods on our right in splendid style; there were three or four times our number already in sight and still others came pouring out of the woods beyond. Our regiment lay on the hill side in mud and water, the rain pouring down in torrents, while each shell screamed so close to us as to make it seem that the next would tear us to pieces. Presently the enemy got near enough to us to make a charge on our battery, and on they came; our men are on their feet in an instant and a terrible fire from the "Spencers" causes the advancing regiment to reel and its colors fall to the ground, but in an instant their colors are up again and on they come, thinking to reach the battery before our guns can be reloaded, but they "reckoned without their host," they didn't know we had the "Spencers," and their charging yell was answered by another terrible volley, and another and another without cessation, until the poor regiment was literally cut to pieces, and but few men of that 20th Tennessee that attempted the charge will ever charge again. During all the rest of the fight at "Hoover's Gap" they never again attempted to take that battery. After the charge they moved four regiments around to our right and attempted to get in our rear, but they were met by two of our regiments posted in the woods, and in five minutes were driven back in the greatest disorder, with a loss of 250 killed and wounded.

Reynolds’ adjutant, Capt. Rice, arrived with orders for Wilder to fall back immediately. Despite threats of arrest, Wilder asked him to return to General Reynolds and tell him he could hold his ground. Meanwhile, Johnson's brigade arrived and now Bate and Johnson planned a final attack on Wilder. Bate's brigade, supported by Johnson's brigade and some artillery, assaulted Wilder's right to him from further enhancing his position along the high ground overlooking Bate's advance.

In response, Wilder sent the remaining six companies of the 17th Indiana to connect the 98th Illinois with their isolated brethren on the wooded hill. Wilder’s dispatch of the whole 17th Indiana was timely and they had hardly reached the hill when the heavy and rapid action began. The four companies of the 17th Indiana were soon under a terrific fire of shot and shell as Rebel infantry, three to four times their number came pouring out of the woods and up the slope. The companies laying down on the hill side working their Spencers without standing up gradually withdrew to the cover of the woods and kept up a galling fire on the Confederates.

Eventually, the ten companies were on the line in single rank bent back into a horse-shoe shape to fit the terrain with either end not more than 100 yards (91 m) apart. Seeing the 17th Indiana under great pressure, Wilder sent Col. Funkhouser’s 98th Illinois to help. .

Confident in their commanders and in their arms, the 98th rushed to the 17th Indiana’s side. As they moved forward some of the Rebels were nearing 50 feet (15 m) of the U.S. line. Funkhouser and his men arrived just as these Rebels approached the crest. Immediately opening fire, the 98th Illinois’ firepower combined with the 17th Indiana’s. As the 98th Illinois worked their levers quickly, the concentrated fire of the two regiments stopped the attack and sent the Confederates running back down the hill.

Through these three attacks, Bates lost 146 killed and wounded (almost a quarter of his force) to Wilder's 61. Due to the heavy volume of fire he received from the brigade, Bate initially thought he was outnumbered five-to-one. The volume of fire caused Bate to believe he faced a "vastly superior force" and he thus established defensive positions.

Skirmishing continued after the last attack. By 7:00 p.m., Stewart ordered Johnson to relieve Bate's brigade and sent Bate to the rear to reorganize. Now, after a long day of combat at 7:00 p.m., the 98th Illinois’ and its comrades’ morale was uplifted by the arrival of a fresh battery at the gallop, which meant the XIV Corps were close behind. A half hour later, infantry from Rousseau and Brannan's divisions arrived at the gap to secure the position against any further assaults. Thomas, shook Wilder's hand and told him, "You have saved the lives of a thousand men by your gallant conduct today. I didn't expect to get to this gap for three days." Rosecrans also arrived on the scene, and instead of reprimanding Wilder for disobeying orders, likewise congratulated him.

=== The Chattanooga and Chickamauga campaign ===
As part of that brigade, it performed admirably in the Tullahoma and Chickamauga campaigns. Its superior firepower due to its Spencers was found to allow it to take on an enemy that outnumbered them on several occasions and triumph. Also, the rapidity of movement afforded by their mounts gave them a rapid response ability that could take and maintain the initiative from the rebelsThis combat power prevented much larger Confederate units from crossing a bridge on the first day of Chickamauga and stopped the left column of the Bragg's key breakthrough on the second day.

=== 1865 ===
The regiment was mustered out on June 27, 1865, and discharged at Springfield, Illinois, on July 7, 1865.

== Affiliations, battle honors, detailed service, and casualties ==
=== Organizational affiliation ===
The 98th Illinois Volunteer Infantry Regiment was organized at Centralia, IL, and served with the following organizations:

- 40th Brigade, 12th Division, Army of the Ohio
- November 1862, 2nd Brigade, 5th Division, Centre XIV Corps, Army of the Cumberland (AoC)
- January 1863, 2nd Brigade, 5th Division, XIV Corps, AoC
- June 1863, 1st Brigade, 4th Division, XIV Corps, AoC
- October 1863, Wilder's Mounted Infantry Brigade, AoC
- November 1863, 3rd Brigade, 2nd Division, Cavalry Corps, AoC
- December 1863, 2nd Brigade, 2nd Division, Cavalry Corps, AoC
- November 1864, 1st Brigade, 2nd Division, Cavalry Corps, Military Division of the Mississippii

=== List of battles ===
The official list of battles in which the regiment bore a part:

- Battle of Hoover's Gap
- Battle of Chickamauga
- Battle of Resaca
- Battle of Ladiga

=== Detailed service ===
==== 1862 ====
- Organized at Centralia, IL and mustered on September 3, 1862.
- Regiment ordered to Louisville, September 8, 1862, thence to Jeffersonville September 9, and to Shepherdsville September 19
- Moved to Elizabethtown, then to Frankfort and Versailles September 30-October 13
- March to Bowling Green, October 26-November 3
- Thence to Scottsboro November 4
- To Gallatin, TN November 26
- To Castillian Spring November 28
- To Bledsoe Creek December 14
- Operations against John Hunt Morgan in Kentucky December 22-January 2, 1863

==== 1863 ====
- Moved to Cave City, thence to Murfreesboro, TN, January 2–8
- Duty at Murfreesboro until February 2
- Expedition to Auburn, Liberty and Alexandria February 3–5
- Regiment mounted March 8
- Expedition to Woodbury March 3–8
- Expedition to Lebanon, Carthage and Liberty April 1–8
- Expedition to McMinville April 20–30
- Reconnaissance to the front May 6
- Armed with Spencer rifles May 31
- Liberty Gap June 4–10
- Tullahoma Campaign June 24-July 7
- Battle of Hoover's Gap June 24–26
- Occupation of Manchester June 27
- Decherd June 29
- Pelham and Elk River Bridge July 2
- Occupation of Middle Tennessee until August 16
- Passage the Cumberland Mountains and Tennessee River in Chickamauga Campaign August 16-September 8
- Friar's Island September 9
- Lee and Gordon's Mill September 11–13
- Ringgold September 11
- Leet's Train Yard September 12–13
- Pea Vine Ridge September 15
- Alexander's Bridge September 18
- Battle of Chickamauga September 19–21
- Operations against Wheeler and Roddy September 30-October 17
- Hill's Gap, Thompson's Cove, near Beersheeba, October 3
- Murfreesboro Road near McMinnville and McMinnville October 4
- Farmington October 7
- Sims' Farm near Shelbyville October 7
- Chattanooga-Ringgold Campaign November 23–27
- Raid on East Tennessee and Georgia Railroad November 24–27
- Charleston November 26
- Cleveland November 27
- March to relief of Knoxville and operations in East Tennessee November 28, 1863, to January 6, 1864
- Near Loudon December 1
- Expedition to Murphey, NC, December 6–12

==== 1864 ====
- Operations in North Alabama January 23–29
- Florence, AL January 25
- Demonstration on Dalton, GA, February 22–27
- Tunnel Hill, Buzzard's Roost Gap and Rocky Face Ridge February 23–25
- Near Dalton February 23
- Atlanta Campaign May 1-September 8
- Battle of Resaca May 13–15
- Rome May 17–18
- Near Dallas May 24
- Operations on line of Pumpkin Vine Creek and battles about Dallas, New Hope Church and Allatoona Hills May 25-June 5
- Near Big Shanty July 9
- Operations about Marietta and against Kennesaw Mountain June 10-July 2
- Noonday Creek June 19-5
- Powder Springs, Lattimer's Mills, June 20
- Noonday Creek and assault on Kennesaw June 27
- Nickajack Creek July 2–5
- Rottenwood Creek July 4
- Chattahoochee River July 5–17
- Garrard's Raid to Covington July 22–24
- Siege of Atlanta July 22-August 25
- Garrard's Raid to South River July 27–31
- Flat Road Bridge July 28
- Kilpatrick's Raid around Atlanta August 20–22
- Operations at Chattahoochee River Bridge August 26-September 2
- Operations against Hood North Georgia and North Alabama September 1-November 3
- Near Lost Mountain October 4–7
- Near Hope Church October 5
- Dallas and Rome October 10–11
- Narrows October 11
- Near Rome October 13
- Near Summervllle October 1
- Little River, AL, October 20
- Leesburg October 1
- Ladiga, Terrapin Creek, October 28
- Moved to Nashville, thence to Louisville, November 2-1 and duty there refitting till December 26
- March Nashville, December 26-January 1, 1865

==== 1865 ====
- March to Gravelly Springs, AL, and duty the until March 13
- Wilson's Raid to Macon, GA, March 1-April 24
- Summerville April 2
- Selma, AL April 2
- Montgomery April 12
- Columbus, GA, April 16
- To Macon April 20
- Provost duty at Macon until May 23
- Moved to Edgefield, TN and duty there until June, 1865
- Mustered out of federal service June 27
- Discharged at Springfield, IL, July 1865.

=== Total strength and casualties ===
The regiment suffered 30 enlisted men who were killed in action or who died of their wounds and 5 officers and 136 enlisted men who died of disease, for a total of 171 fatalities.

== Commanders ==
- Colonel John J. Funkhouser - Discharged due to wounds July 5, 1864.

== Armament/Equipment/Uniform ==
=== Armament ===
The 98th Illinois was an 1862, three-year regiment, that greatly increased the number of men under arms in the federal army. As with many of these volunteers, initially, there were not enough Model 1861 Springfield Rifles to go around so they were instead issued imported Austrian Rifle Muskets (Note: The Lorenz rifle was the third most widely used rifle during the American Civil War. The Union recorded purchases of 226,924. Its quality was inconsistent. Some were considered to be of the finest quality (particularly ones from the Vienna Arsenal), and were sometimes praised as being superior to the Enfield; others, especially those in later purchases from private contractors, were described as horrible in both design and condition. Lorenz rifles in the Civil War were generally used with .54 caliber cartridges designed for the Model 1841 "Mississippi" rifle. These differed from the cartridges manufactured in Austria and may have contributed to the unreliability of the weapons. Many of the rifles were bored out to .58 caliber to accommodate standard Springfield rifle ammunition.) Initially an infantry unit that served in the Army of Ohio, they then joined the Army of the Cumberland at the new year in 1863. They reported the following on ordnance surveys:

- 4th Quarter 1862 Quarterly Ordnance Survey-259 Austrian Rifle Muskets, leaf and block sights, quadrangular bayonet (.577 Cal), 25 Springfield Model 1855/1861 National Armory (NA) (Note: In government records, National Armory refers to one of three United States Armory and Arsenals, the Springfield Armory, the Harpers Ferry Armory, and the Rock Island Arsenal. Rifle-muskets, muskets, and rifles were manufactured in Springfield and Harper's Ferry before the war. When the Rebels destroyed the Harpers Ferry Armory early in the American Civil War and stole the machinery for the Richmond Arsenal, the Springfield Armory was briefly the only government manufacturer of arms, until the Rock Island Arsenal was established in 1862. During this time production ramped up to unprecedented levels ever seen in American manufacturing up until that time, with only 9,601 rifles manufactured in 1860, rising to a peak of 276,200 by 1864. These advancements would not only give the Union a decisive technological advantage over the Confederacy during the war but served as a precursor to the mass production manufacturing that contributed to the post-war Second Industrial Revolution and 20th century machine manufacturing capabilities. American historian Merritt Roe Smith has drawn comparisons between the early assembly machining of the Springfield rifles and the later production of the Ford Model T, with the latter having considerably more parts, but producing a similar numbers of units in the earliest years of the 1913–1915 automobile assembly line, indirectly due to mass production manufacturing advancements pioneered by the armory 50 years earlier.) and contract (.58 Cal.) (Note: The quarterly survey lacked reports from companies E, F, and H, so one can estimate from 150-250 further Lorenz or Springfield Rifled-muskets were carried by the regiment.)
- 1st Quarter 1863 Quarterly Ordnance Survey-649 Austrian Rifle Muskets, leaf and block sights, quadrangular socket bayonet (.577 Cal), 25 Springfield Model 1855/1861 National Armory (NA) and contract (.58 Cal.)

During the spring of 1863, the regiment was converted to mounted infantry, and on May 31, it received Spencer rifles. A handful of men received the Colt 5-shot revolver rifles. It was also issued Colt Model 1860 .44 "Army" pistols. They reported the following numbers of Spencers in the ordnance surveys:

- 2nd Quarter 1863 Quarterly Ordnance Survey-417 Spencer rifles, single-leaf folding sight, triangular socket bayonet (.52 Cal), 19 Colt Model 1860 (.44 Cal)
- 3rd Quarter 1863 Quarterly Ordnance Survey-354 Spencer rifles, single-leaf folding sight, triangular socket bayonet (.52 Cal), 9 Colt 5-shot revolver rifles (.56 Cal)
- 4th Quarter 1863 Quarterly Ordnance Survey-417 Spencer rifles, single-leaf folding sight, triangular socket bayonet (.52 Cal), 6 Colt Model 1860 (.44 Cal)
Issued weapons

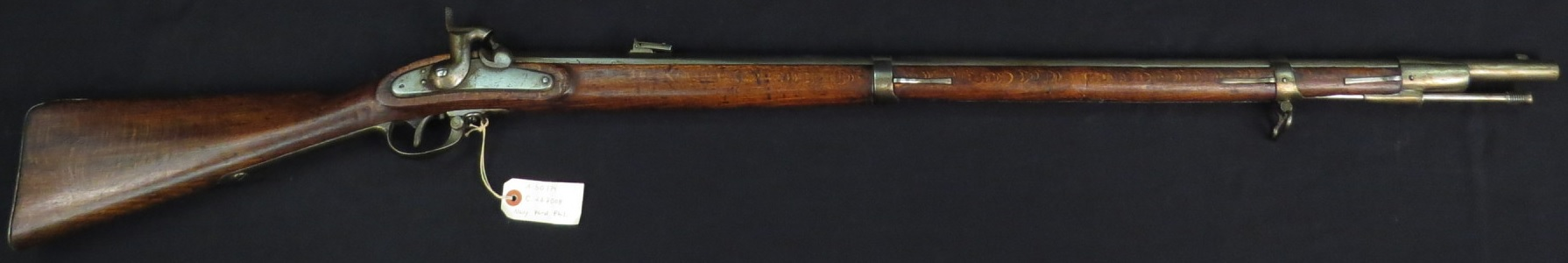
Lorenz Rifle Model 1854

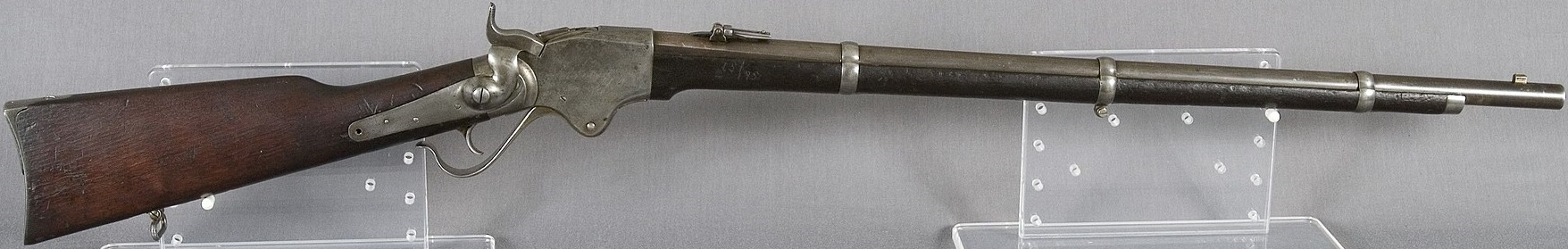
M1862 Spencer rifle

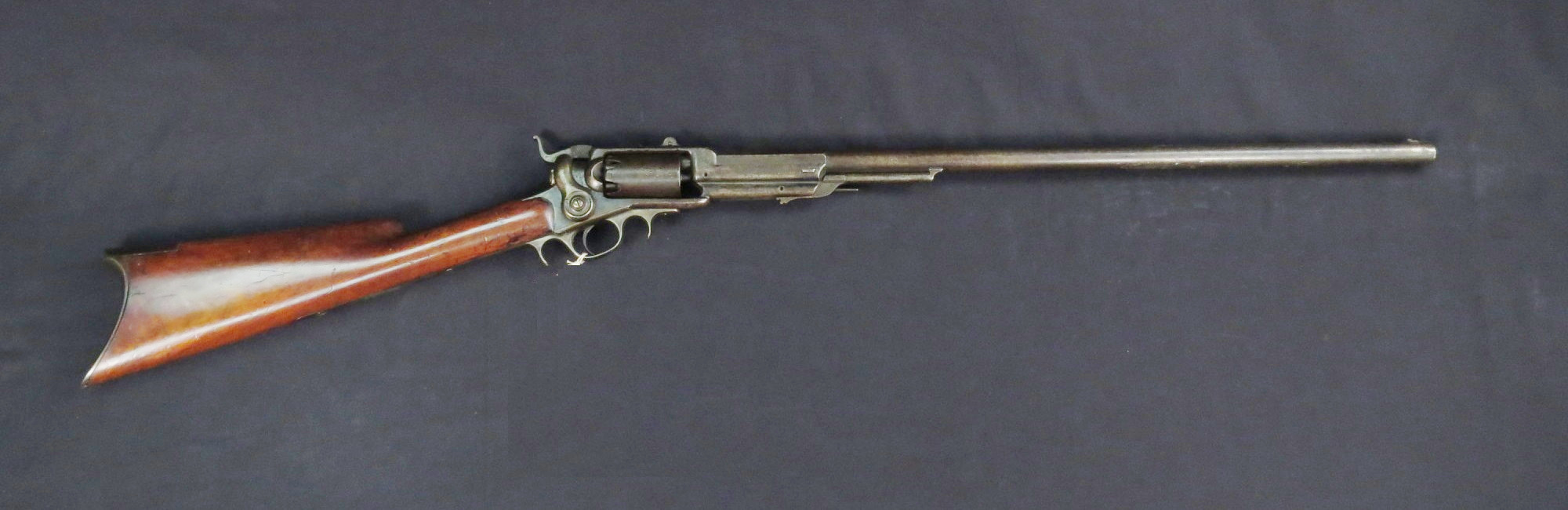
Colt Model 1855 revolving rifle

=== Uniforms ===
The 98th Illinois had enlisted to fight as infantry, and Wilder had the issue of mounting the brigade put to a vote. The men of the 98th Illinois voted to go with the change but were adamant that they wanted to move and fight as mounted infantry. In March, they received new hats, standard Federal cavalry jackets trimmed in yellow (and a small amount of the prewar green trimmed mounted rifle version), and reinforced mounted trousers. The men promptly removed the yellow piping from the jackets and trousers, although some kept the green rifle trimming. Like most of the western U.S. volunteers, an undecorated 1858 Hardee hat or black civilian slouch hat was the normal headgear.

== See also ==
- List of Illinois Civil War Units
- Illinois in the American Civil War
