= Hollywood Cemetery =

Hollywood Cemetery may refer to:

in the United States

(by state)

- Hollywood Cemetery, Confederate Section, Hot Springs, Arkansas, listed on the National Register of Historic Places in Arkansas
- Hollywood Forever Cemetery, listed on the National Register of Historic Places in California
- Hollywood Cemetery (Jackson, Tennessee), listed on the National Register of Historic Places in Tennessee
- Hollywood Cemetery (Richmond, Virginia), listed on the National Register of Historic Places in Virginia
