= Troy A. McGill =

United States Army soldier and Medal of Honor recipient

- Born: July 15, 1914; Knoxville, Tennessee
- Died: March 4, 1944 (aged 29); Los Negros, Admiralty Islands
- Burial place: Knoxville National Cemetery Knoxville, Tennessee
- Military career
- Allegiance: United States of America
- Branch: United States Army
- Service years: 1940 - 1944
- Rank: Sergeant
- Units: 5th Cavalry Regiment, 1st Cavalry Division
- Conflicts: World War II: Admiralty Islands campaign; Battle of Los Negros †
- Awards: Medal of Honor

Troy A. McGill (July 15, 1914 – March 4, 1944) was a United States Army soldier and a recipient of the United States military's highest decoration—the Medal of Honor—for his actions during the Admiralty Islands campaign of World War II.

== Biography ==
McGill joined the Army from Ada, Oklahoma, in November 1940, and by March 4, 1944, was serving as a Sergeant in Troop G, 5th Cavalry Regiment, 1st Cavalry Division. During an enemy attack on that day, on Los Negros in the Admiralty Islands, he held his ground against the numerically superior force. After ordering the only other un-wounded man in his squad to retreat, he continued to hold his position alone and eventually engaged the enemy in hand to hand combat until he was killed. For these actions, he was posthumously awarded the Medal of Honor six months later, on September 11, 1944.

McGill, aged 29 at his death, was buried at Knoxville National Cemetery in his birth city of Knoxville, Tennessee.

A section of Interstate 40 in East Tennessee is named "Troy A. McGill Memorial Highway".

== Medal of Honor citation ==
Sergeant McGill's official Medal of Honor citation reads:

For conspicuous gallantry and intrepidity above and beyond the call of duty in action with the enemy at Los Negros Island, Admiralty Group, on 4 March 1944. In the early morning hours Sgt. McGill, with a squad of 8 men, occupied a revetment which bore the brunt of a furious attack by approximately 200 drink-crazed enemy troops. Although covered by crossfire from machine-guns on the right and left flank he could receive no support from the remainder of our troops stationed at his rear. All members of the squad were killed or wounded except Sgt. McGill and another man, whom he ordered to return to the next revetment. Courageously resolved to hold his position at all cost, he fired his weapon until it ceased to function. Then, with the enemy only 5 yards away, he charged from his foxhole in the face of certain death and clubbed the enemy with his rifle in hand-to-hand combat until he was killed. At dawn 105 enemy dead were found around his position. Sgt. McGill's intrepid stand was an inspiration to his comrades and a decisive factor in the defeat of a fanatical enemy.

== See also ==
- List of Medal of Honor recipients
