= Confederate Cemetery Monument (Tennessee) =

Cemetery in Marshall County, Tennessee, US

- U.S. National Register of Historic Places
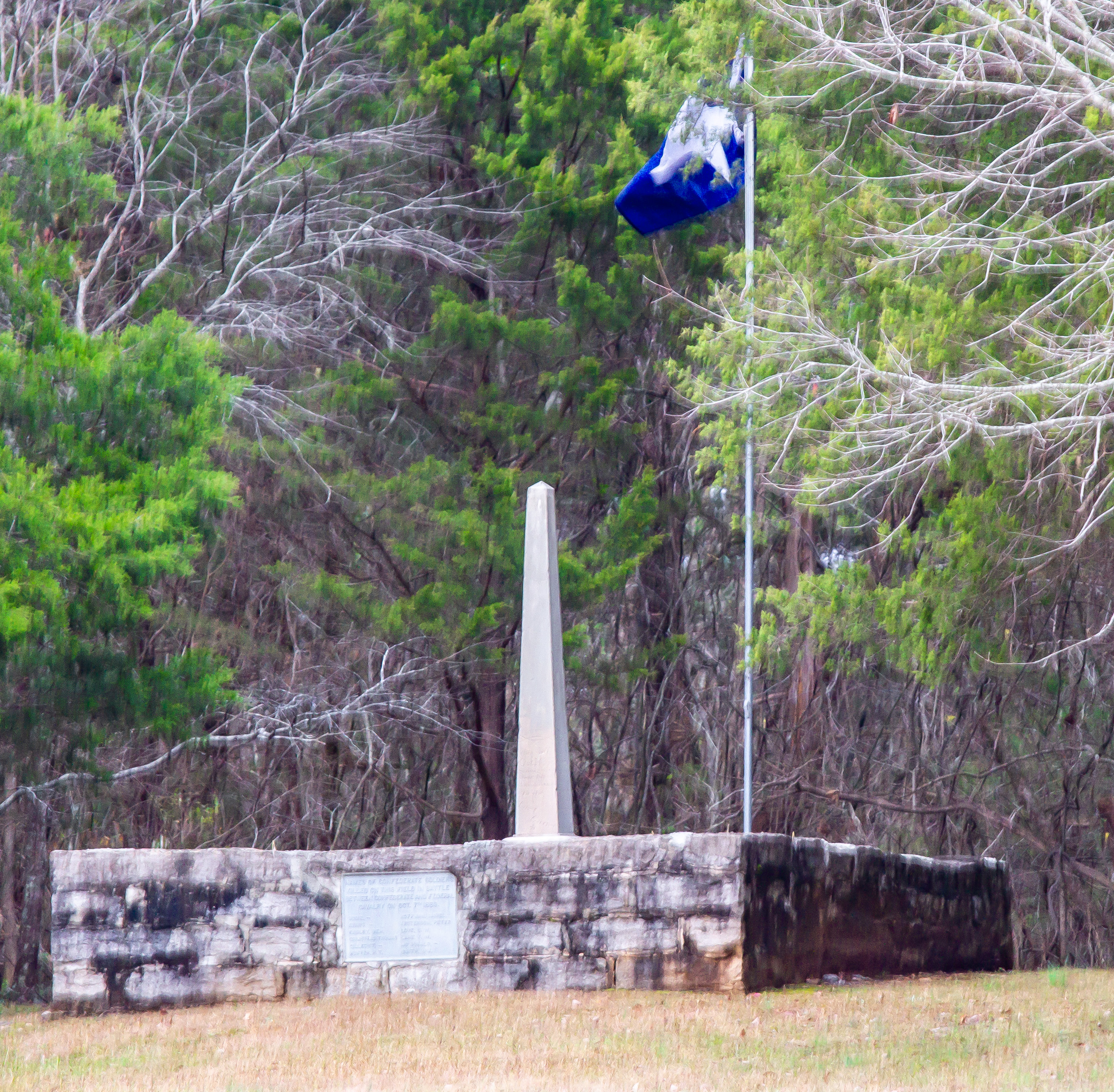

- Location within Tennessee Location within the United States
- Location: 2279 TN-64, Farmington, Tennessee
- Coordinates: 35°29′53″N 86°41′54″W
- Area: less than one acre
- Built: 1874
- NRHP reference No.: 01000731
- Added to NRHP: July 11, 2001

Confederate Cemetery Monument is a monument that includes a cemetery for veterans of the Confederate States Army during the American Civil War, especially the Battle of Farmington under General Joseph Wheeler, in Farmington, Tennessee, U.S. It includes four walls around the cemetery and a "pyramid-topped obelisk". A historical marker on reads "In the cemetery north of the road are buried Confederate soldiers of the Army of Tennessee, who fell while opposing Rosecrans' Army of the Cumberland through Liberty Gap and Guy's Gap, in late June 1863. Also buried here are soldiers of Forrest's Cavalry, killed in minor operations.". It has been listed on the National Register of Historic Places since July 11, 2001.
