= Delap (surname) =

Delap or DeLap is a surname, and may refer to:

- Finn Delap (born 2005), English footballer
- John Delap (1725–1812), English clergyman and writer
- Kathleen Delap (1910–2004), Irish feminist and activist
- Liam Delap (born 2003), English footballer
- Maude Delap (1866–1953), Irish marine biologist
- Patrick Delap (1932–1987), Irish politician
- Richard Delap (1942–1987), Canadian science fiction writer
- Robert H. DeLap (1846–1922), American politician
- Rory Delap (born 1976), English-born Irish footballer, father of Liam and Finn
- Tony DeLap (1927–2019), American sculptor
- Truman H. DeLap (1885–1974), American politician

== See also ==
- Delap (disambiguation)
