= Knoxville National Cemetery =

Historic veterans cemetery in Knox County, Tennessee

- U.S. National Register of Historic Places
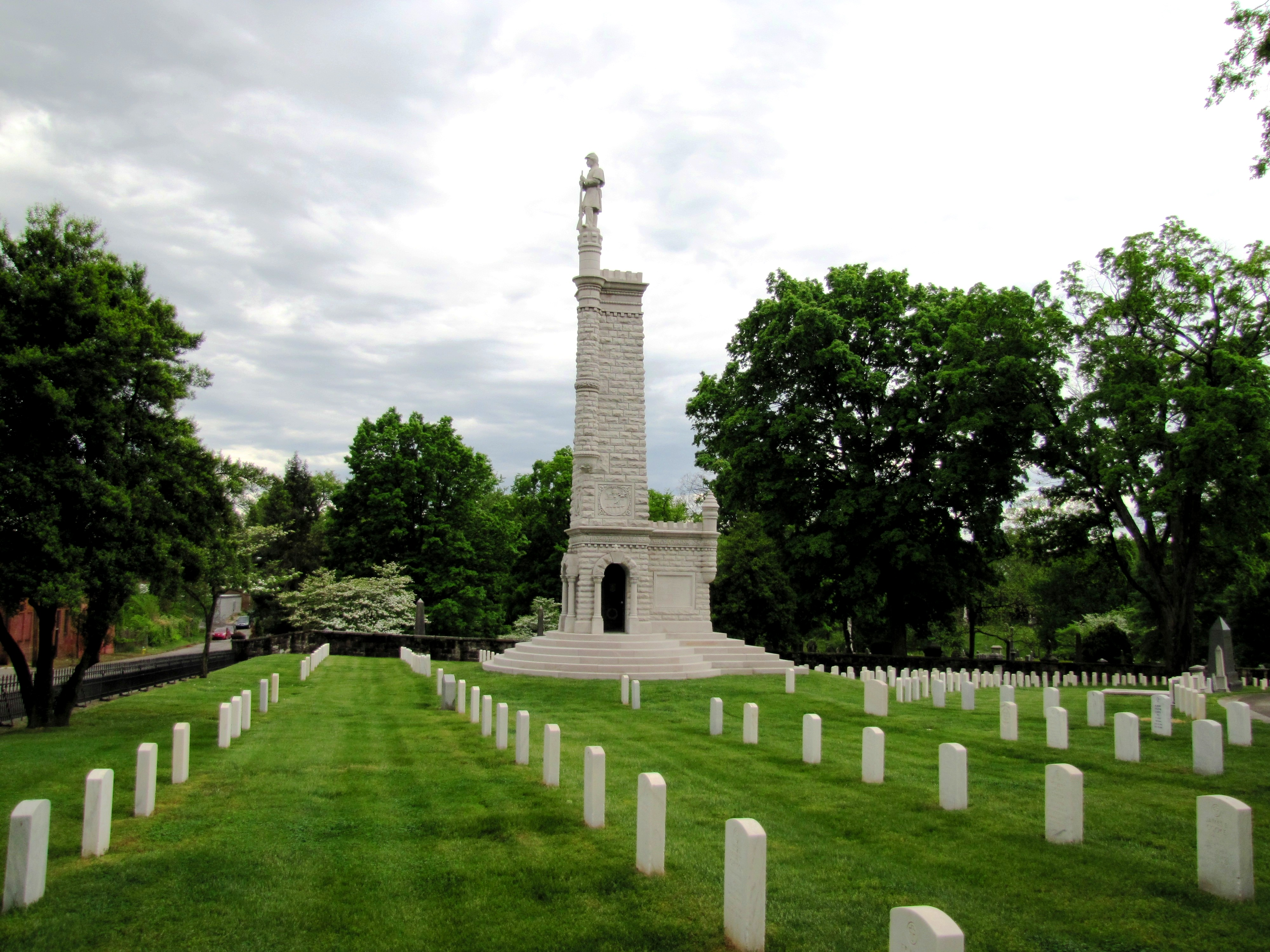
- Union Soldier monument
- Location: 939 Tyson St., NW; Knoxville, Tennessee
- Coordinates: 35°58′32″N 83°55′39″W
- MPS: Civil War Era National Cemeteries MPS
- NRHP reference No.: 96000966
- Added to NRHP: September 12, 1996

Knoxville National Cemetery is a United States National Cemetery located in the city of Knoxville, Tennessee, United States. Established during the Civil War in 1863, the cemetery currently encompasses 9.8 acres (4.0 ha), and as of the end of 2007, had 9,006 interments. The 60-foot (18 m) Union Soldier monument, which stands in the eastern corner of the cemetery, is one of the largest Union monuments in the South. In 1996, the cemetery was added to the National Register of Historic Places as part of a multiple properties submission for national cemeteries.

== History ==
Knoxville National Cemetery was established by Major General Ambrose Burnside, whose Union forces had liberated Knoxville in September 1863 at the height of the Civil War. Burnside assigned the task of layout out the cemetery to his assistant quartermaster, Captain E.B. Chamberlain. The cemetery's first burials were Union dead exhumed and moved from Cumberland Gap and other parts of the region. Chamberlain's plan was so effective, that the cemetery was one of the few in the nation that required no alterations upon being designated a national cemetery at the end of the war.

== Layout ==
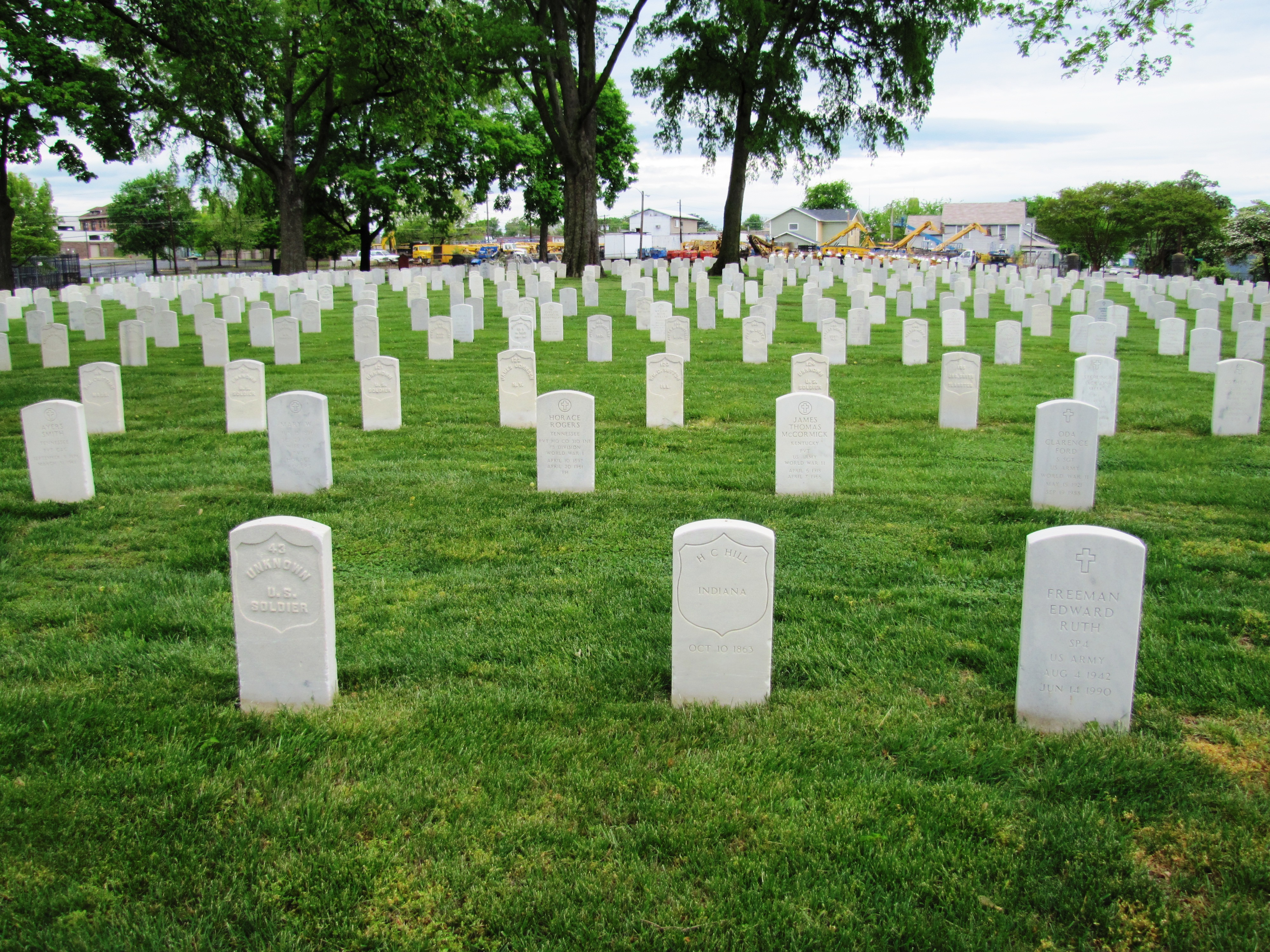
View from the center of the cemetery

The graves at Knoxville National Cemetery are arranged in a circular pattern, with each burial section separated by walkways. The burial sections each form one quarter of the circle, with the headstones converging toward the middle, where there is a flagpole and cloth canopy. A stone wall surrounds the perimeter, the southeast section of which divides the cemetery from the adjacent Old Gray Cemetery. The northeast section of the wall, which contains the main entrance, is topped by an iron fence, with the entrance secured by an iron double-gate. The administrative office and service building is located just inside the gate. A marker containing several lines from the Theodore O'Hara poem, Bivouac of the Dead, faces the graves in the northeast corner.

Most of the grave markers are marble headstones of a standard size and shape, although a few have larger and more elaborate markers. Inscriptions typically give the deceased's name and years lived, and in some cases, note the deceased's rank, company, and/or war in which they served. The burials are limited to veterans and spouses of veterans. After the Civil War, the cemetery only accepted Union burials, although the cemetery contains at least one Confederate grave. The cemetery is currently administered by Mountain Home National Cemetery, and contains veterans of every war since the Civil War.

== Union Soldier monument ==
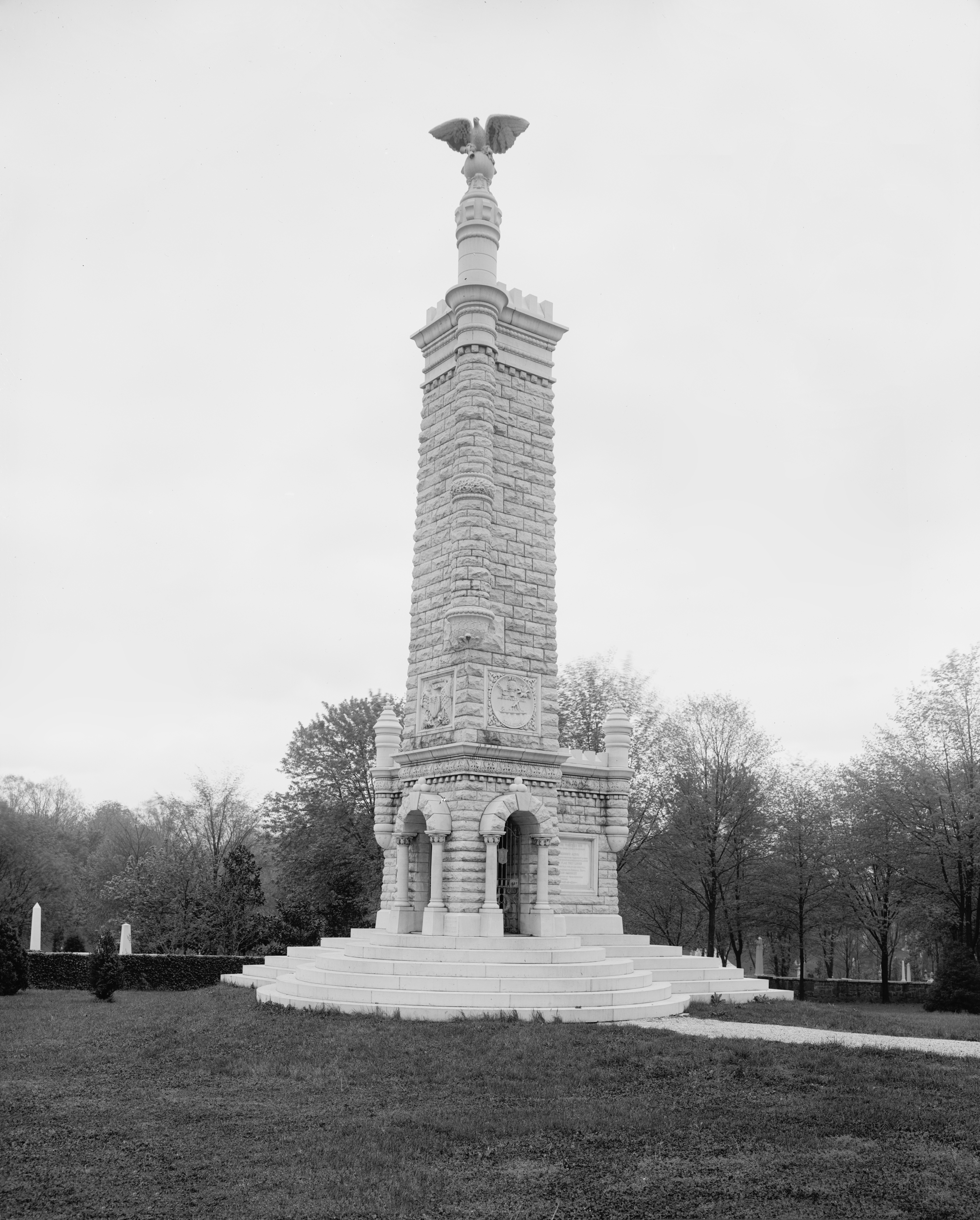
Early-1900s photograph of the monument, showing the bronze eagle shattered by lightning in 1904

The Union Soldier monument, in the cemetery's eastern corner, was erected in the early 1900s. In 1892, Knoxville's Confederate veterans installed a 48-foot (15 m) monument topped by a statue of a Confederate soldier at the Confederate National Cemetery near the Mabry-Hazen House in East Knoxville. Not to be outdone, the local chapter of the Grand Army of the Republic formed a commission, headed by former Union Army officer and Knoxville Journal publisher William Rule (1839–1928), to raise money to build a monument of greater size at Knoxville National Cemetery.

Completed in 1901, the monument initially stood 50 feet (15 m) – the height having been calculated to surpass that of the Confederates' monument – and was topped by a bronze eagle with wings spread. On August 22, 1904, however, the eagle was shattered by a bolt of lightning, the sound of which rattled Knoxville and could be heard for miles all around. Undaunted, the GAR commissioners planned immediate reconstruction, using federal funds secured by Congressman Henry R. Gibson. The new monument, designed by the local architectural firm Baumann Brothers, largely followed the original design, the exception being a marble statue of a Union soldier placed atop the monument rather than an eagle. The new monument was completed on October 15, 1906.

The monument, built of locally quarried marble, represents a medieval fortress, with stained glass windows and an inner room and staircase. The 8-foot (2.4 m) soldier statue stands at post atop the main tower. The monument is sometimes called the "Wilder Monument," as local legend suggests the soldier bears the likeness of Union general and East Tennessee businessman John T. Wilder.

== Notable interments ==
- Medal of Honor recipients
  - Sergeant Troy A. McGill (1914–1944), for action in World War II.
  - Private Timothy Spillane (1842–1901), for action at the Battle of Hatcher's Run during the Civil War.
- Others
  - Brevet Major General Joseph Alexander Cooper (1823–1910), veteran of the Mexican–American War and U.S. Civil War.
  - Brigadier General Robert Neyland (1892–1962), veteran of World War I and World War II; aide to Douglas MacArthur, then superintendent of West Point. Neyland was head coach of the Tennessee Volunteers football team and Neyland Stadium is named after him.

== See also ==
- List of cemeteries in Tennessee
- First Presbyterian Church Cemetery, the oldest cemetery in Knoxville
