= Calvary Cemetery (Memphis) =

Cemetery in Memphis, Tennessee

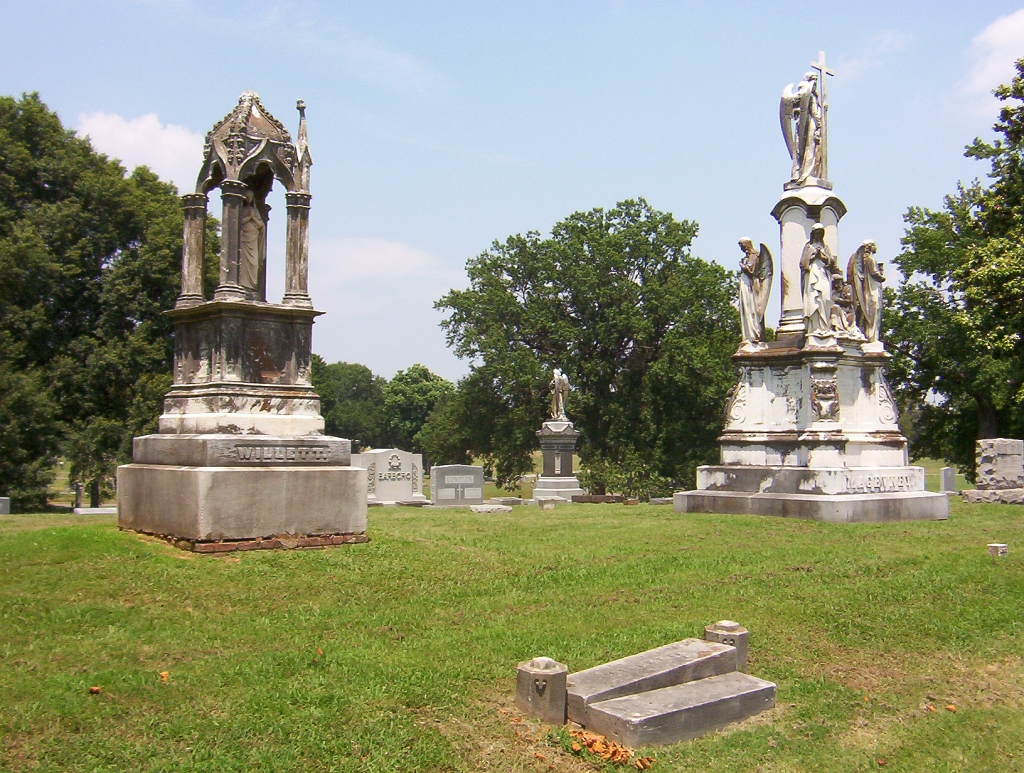
- Interactive map of Calvary Cemetery

Details
- Established: 1867
- Location: 1663 Elvis Presley Boulevard, Memphis, Tennessee, U.S.
- Coordinates: 35°06′12″N 90°01′28″W
- Type: Public
- No. of graves: 45,000
- Find a Grave: Calvary Cemetery
- The Political Graveyard: Calvary Cemetery

Calvary Cemetery in Memphis, Tennessee, is a historic Catholic burial ground consecrated in 1867. Located at 1663 Elvis Presley Boulevard, it serves as the second Catholic cemetery in Shelby County, following the closure of St. Peter Cemetery. It was founded in 1867 by Fr Martin Riordon.

== List of notable burials ==
- Justin Canale (1943–2011) professional football player
- Dino Chiozza (1912–1972) professional MLB baseball player with the Philadelphia Phillies
- Lou Chiozza (1910–1971) professional MLB baseball player with the Philadelphia Phillies and New York Giants
- Young Dolph (né Adolph Robert Thornton Jr.; 1985–2021) American rapper and record executive
- Phil Gagliano (1941–2016) professional MLB baseball player with the St. Louis Cardinals
- Samuel Henderson (c. 1827–1907) African-American groundskeeper and Catholic convert
- Joseph Dominic Montedonico (1852–1909) Italian-American banker and insurance executive, a member of the Tennessee State Senate

== See also ==
- List of cemeteries in Tennessee
