= Samuel Henderson (born 1827) =

African-American slave and Catholic convert

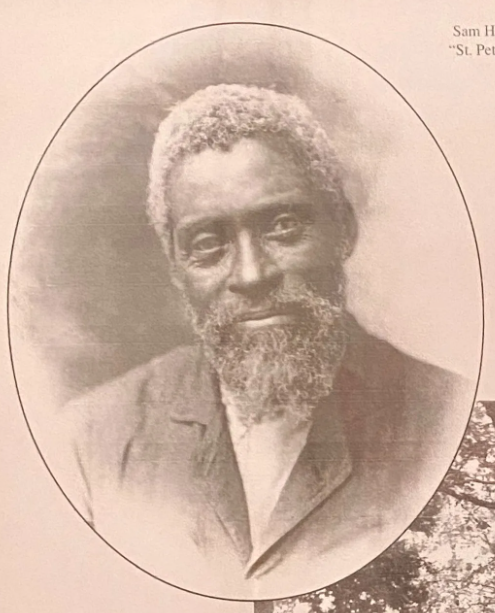
- Born: c. 1827; Tennessee, United States
- Died: February 13, 1907 (aged 79–80); Memphis, Tennessee, United States

Samuel Henderson (c. 1827 – 13 February 1907), known as Uncle Sam and St. Peter's Sam, was an African-American groundskeeper and Catholic convert. He is under consideration for beatification in the Catholic Church.

== Biography ==
=== Early life ===
Little is known about Henderson's early life. He was born into slavery in 1827 and became a free man after the American Civil War.

=== Conversion and ministry ===
Arriving in Memphis, Henderson's connections with the Church started in the first ten years after the American Civil War. A recently freed slave, he served as a minister to a tiny Baptist congregation located next to St. Peter's Catholic Church at that time.

He was known to attend the parish and listen to the Dominicans' homilies during the early Sunday Mass and would then go back to his own congregation and preach the gospel, using them as an inspiration. Henderson and his wife later converted to Catholicism, joining the predominantly Irish parish of St. Peter and Paul Catholic Church, and also as a result of the friendship and preaching of the friars. He joined the church as their handyman, a role he retained for more than 30 years.

Henderson made a commitment to protect the Dominican friars, going with them as they cared for the orphans, made sick calls, and brought viaticum to the terminally ill. Due to the civic collapse brought about by yellow fever epidemic, Memphis had become more dangerous and Henderson worried for the safety of the priests. As night fell, he always escorted the friars by the light of his lamp.

Henderson was admired by the friars for his bravery being Black and Catholic in a city notorious for racism and anti-Catholic prejudice. Noticing that he was susceptible to illness, he also entered the houses of the terminally ill. He was one of the people that took care of the Dominican priests and often prepared them before their funeral.

=== Death ===
He lived another 30 years as a faithful member of St. Peter's Parish and died on February 13, 1907, at the age of 80. He was given a solemn Requiem Mass after which he was carried to his grave by eight Dominican friars. He is remembered today as "St. Peter's Sam", which appears on his monument in the "Negro Section" of Calvary Cemetery in Memphis.

== Beatification ==
The Dominican Friars of the Province of Saint Martin de Porres and the Diocese of Memphis have initiated preliminary investigations into the possible sainthood of Henderson.
