= Justin Canale =

American gridiron football player (1943–2011)

No. 63
- Position: Offensive guard

Personal information
- Born: April 11, 1943; Memphis, Tennessee, U.S.
- Died: October 11, 2011 (aged 68); Memphis, Tennessee, U.S.
- Listed height: 6 ft 2 in (1.88 m)
- Listed weight: 250 lb (113 kg)

Career information
- High school: Memphis Catholic (TN)
- College: Mississippi State
- NFL draft: 1965: 12th round, 167th overall pick
- AFL draft: 1965: 6th round, 47 (by the Boston Patriots)th overall pick

Career history
- Boston Patriots (1965–1968); Cincinnati Bengals (1969); Montreal Alouettes (1970–1972); Memphis Southmen (1974–1975)

Awards and highlights
- Grey Cup champion (1970); Second-team All-SEC (1964)

Career NFL statistics
- Games played: 64
- Stats at Pro Football Reference

Dominic Justin Canale, more commonly known as Justin Canale (April 11, 1943 – October 11, 2011) was an American collegiate and professional football player who played offensive lineman for five seasons in the American Football League (AFL), for the Boston Patriots and Cincinnati Bengals from 1965 to 1969. He scored one point during his NFL career; he kicked an extra point in a game against the Houston Oilers on November 5, 1967. He also played with the Montreal Alouettes of the Canadian Football League (CFL), winning a Grey Cup championship in 1970. Canale came back to play two seasons for the Memphis Southmen of the World Football League (WFL).

Canale died on October 11, 2011, in Memphis, Tennessee. He was buried at Calvary Cemetery in Memphis.

He was one of six brothers who played college football at Mississippi State or at the University of Tennessee. His brother Whit Canale, also a former AFL player.

== See also ==
- Other American Football League players
