= Whit Canale =

American football player (1941–2011)

Profile
- Position: Defensive end

Personal information
- Born: December 27, 1941; Memphis, Tennessee
- Died: September 17, 2011 (aged 69); Memphis, Tennessee

Career information
- College: Tennessee
- NFL draft: 1966: undrafted

Career history
- Pittsburgh Steelers, Miami Dolphins (1966); Boston Patriots (1968)
- Stats at Pro Football Reference

John Whitfield "Whit" Canale (December 27, 1941 – September 17, 2011) was an American collegiate and professional football player who played defensive lineman in the American Football League (AFL), for the Pittsburgh Steelers, Miami Dolphins, and the Boston Patriots.

== Career ==
Canale was initially drafted by the Steelers in the 17th round of the 1965 NFL Draft with the 227th overall pick.

== Personal life ==
He was one of six brothers who played college football at Mississippi State or at the University of Tennessee. His brother, Justin Canale, was also a former professional football player.

== Death ==
He died on September 17, 2011, in Memphis, Tennessee.

== See also ==
- List of American Football League players
