= Timothy Spillane =

Soldier and veteran of the American Civil War

- Born: 1842; County Kerry, Ireland
- Died: December 3, 1901 (aged 58–59); Knoxville, Tennessee
- Burial place: Knoxville National Cemetery, Knoxville, Tennessee
- Military career
- Allegiance: United States of America
- Branch: United States Army; Union Army
- Rank: Private
- Units: Company C, 16th Pennsylvania Cavalry
- Conflicts: Battle of Hatcher's Run, Virginia
- Awards: Medal of Honor

Timothy Spillane (1842 – December 3, 1901) was an Irish-born soldier who fought for the Union Army during the American Civil War. He received the Medal of Honor for valor.

== Biography ==
Spillane received the Medal of Honor on September 16, 1880, for his actions at the Battle of Hatcher's Run from February 5–7, 1865 while with Company C of the 16th Pennsylvania Cavalry.

== Medal of Honor citation ==
Citation:

The President of the United States of America, in the name of Congress, takes pleasure in presenting the Medal of Honor to Private Timothy Spillane, United States Army, for extraordinary heroism on February 5–7, 1865, while serving with Company C, 16th Pennsylvania Cavalry, in action at Hatcher's Run, Virginia, for gallantry and good conduct in action; bravery in a charge and reluctance to leave the field after being twice wounded."

== See also ==
- List of American Civil War Medal of Honor recipients: Q-S
