= Battle of Farmington, Tennessee =

Battle of the American Civil War

Battle of Farmington
- Part of American Civil War
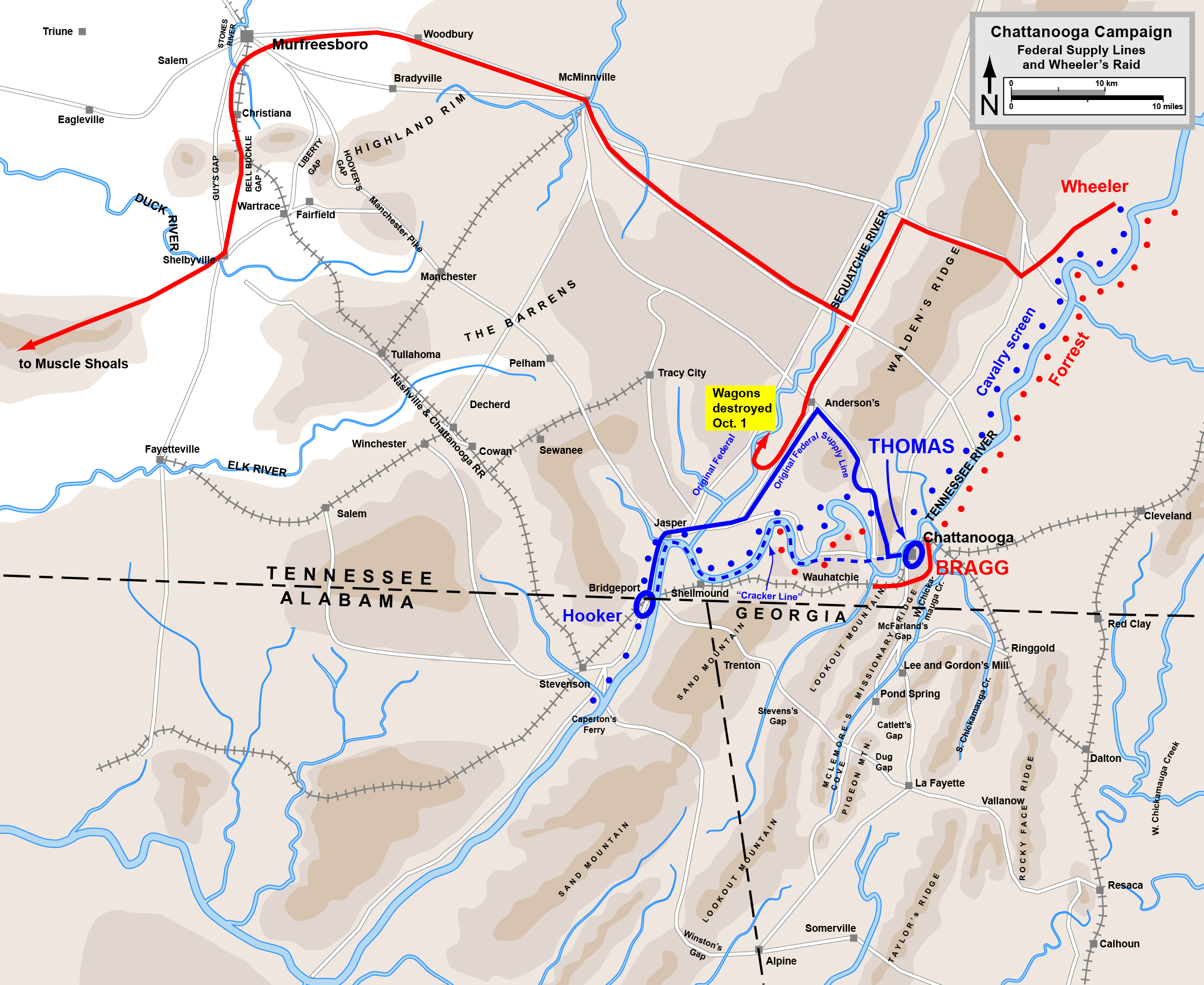
- Map of Wheeler's raid (October 1-9, 1863)
Date	October 7, 1863
Location	Farmington, Tennessee
Result	Union victory

Belligerents
United States (Union)	(Confederate States of America) CSA (Confederacy)

Commanders and leaders
George Crook	Joseph Wheeler

Units involved
Source: Chicago Board of Trade Independent Battery Light Artillery; 92nd Illinois Mounted Infantry Regiment; 98th Illinois Mounted Infantry Regiment; 123rd Illinois Mounted Infantry Regiment; 17th Indiana Mounted Infantry Regiment; 72nd Indiana Mounted Infantry Regiment; 2nd Kentucky Cavalry Regiment; 1st Ohio Cavalry Regiment 3rd Ohio Cavalry Regiment; 4th Ohio Cavalry Regiment	

Strength
25,000	4,000

Casualties and losses
75	310

The Battle of Farmington, Tennessee was fought October 7, 1863 in Farmington, Marshall County, Tennessee as part of Confederate Major General Joseph Wheeler's October 1863 Raid in the American Civil War.

== Background ==
From October 1-9, 1863, Maj. Gen. Joseph Wheeler, under orders from Bragg, launched a raid into Southern Tennessee, with the objective of disrupting Rosecrans's communications across Walden's Ridge.

At Anderson's Cross Roads, Wheeler launched a surprise attack on a Federal mule-driven wagon, which were initially driven, and pillaged the wagons before a Union Cavalry under the command of Col. Edward M. McCook retook the 800 mules and several wagons, alongside inflicting 270 losses on the Confederates.

== Battle ==
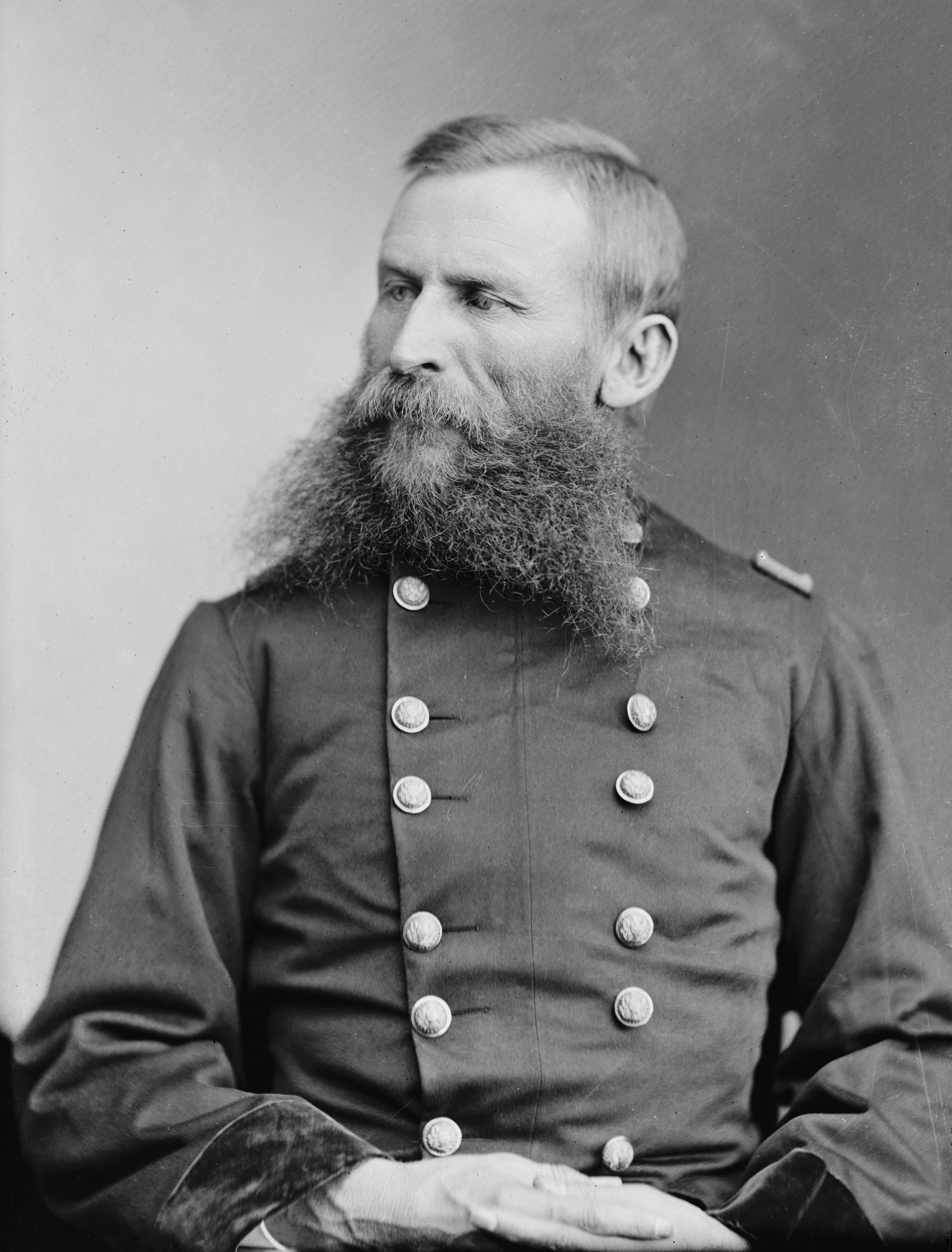
Gen. George Crook

The 8,000 Union force, under George Crook, launched a pursuit on Wheeler's forces, which were on the Farmington Turnpike, and the Confederate rearguard, consisting of the 8th Tennessee and the 1st Kentucky Cavalry, faced an attack from the 72nd Indiana and 123rd Illinois Infantry Regiments, at Palmetto, Kentucky, which after being sharply engaged, were forced to fall back to a sunken road, which led to Farmington.

Near Farmington, Confederate artillery bombarded the Federal force in an attempt to slow their advance, while two companies from the 8th Texas Cavalry launched a cavalry charge against the federals, while the remainder of the regiment crossed over East Rock Creek.

After almost two hours of fighting Union cavalry, the Confederates burned the bridge over the East Rock Creek before retreating to Lewisburg, Tennessee.

== Aftermath ==
The pursuit had continued even further, with elements of the Union cavalry, riding as far as 57 miles, as Wheeler escaped, by crossing the Tennessee River and into Rogersville, Alabama by October 9, but not before 95 of Wheeler's cavalrymen were overwhelmed near Pulaski, Tennessee.

== See also ==
- Chattanooga campaign
- Tennessee In the American Civil War

== Sources ==
=== Bibliography ===
- McDonough, James Lee. Chattanooga: A Death Grip on the Confederacy. Knoxville, Tennessee: The University of Tennessee Press, 1984. ISBN 0-87049-425-2.
