= St. Mary's Cemetery (Lawrence County, Tennessee) =

Historic cemetery in Tennessee, United States

- U.S. National Register of Historic Places
- Location within Tennessee Location within the United States
- Coordinates: 35°1′53″N 87°24′53″W
- Area: 0.1 acres (0.040 ha)
- Built: 1872
- MPS: German Catholic Churches and Cemeteries of Lawrence County TR
- NRHP reference No.: 84000095
- Added to NRHP: October 10, 1984

St. Mary's Cemetery is a historic Roman Catholic cemetery in Lawrence County, Tennessee, United States, located off Rascal Town Road, 5 miles (8.0 km) southeast of St. Joseph. The cemetery contains about 20 19th-century monuments and was still being used for burials as of the late 20th century. The cemetery and its white iron gate are the only remaining physical evidence of the 19th-century German Catholic settlement of St. Mary's. A number of the 19th-century monuments in the cemetery have German-language inscriptions. A small log church was built at the site in 1872 but was no longer standing as of 1984, when the cemetery was listed on the National Register of Historic Places.
