= Hollywood Cemetery (Jackson, Tennessee) =

Historic cemetery in Tennessee, United States

- U.S. National Register of Historic Places
- Location within Tennessee Location within the United States
- Location: 406 Hollywood Drive, Jackson, Tennessee
- Coordinates: 35°37′23″N 88°50′04″W
- Area: approx. 25 acres (10 ha)
- Built: 1824
- NRHP reference No.: 03000430
- Added to NRHP: May 22, 2003

Hollywood Cemetery is a cemetery in Jackson, Tennessee located on Hollywood Drive at Williams Street, about 0.4 miles north of Airways Boulevard. At present, it occupies a deeded area of 30 acres. The B'Nai Israel Jewish cemetery is located adjacent to the north-west corner of Hollywood Cemetery.

== History ==
On 17 December 1886 a group incorporated as Hollywood Cemetery. After purchasing fifty acres of land from Robert Hurt for $3,000 on 23 December 1886, the group founded the cemetery. By 1900 the cemetery held nearly 100 burials, nine of whom had died before the cemetery was founded and whose graves were relocated from their original locations. In the period to the early 20th century, the cemetery was the chief burial ground for local wealthy and upper-middle-class citizens, which is borne out by its layout, landscaping and many stylish and ornamental monuments.

In 1986, during the cemetery's centennial year, the governing board arranged for all memorials to be surveyed and documented. Subsequent surveys supplemented the records, and the database can be searched online.

== 21st century ==
Hollywood Cemetery was added to the National Register of Historic Places on 22 May 2003, and is the largest of three cemeteries in Jackson listed, the others being Mount Olivet and Riverside.

By February 2020 the cemetery held more than 10,000 graves and had more than 1500 lots for sale.

== Notable burials ==
- Wink Martindale (1933-2025), game show host, radio personality, television producer
- Thomas Jefferson Murray, U.S. Representative (1894–1971)
- Herron Carney Pearson, U.S. Representative (1890–1953)

== See also ==
- List of cemeteries in Tennessee
