= East Hill Cemetery (Tennessee and Virginia) =

Historic cemetery in Tennessee and Virginia, United States

- U.S. National Register of Historic Places
- Virginia Landmarks Register
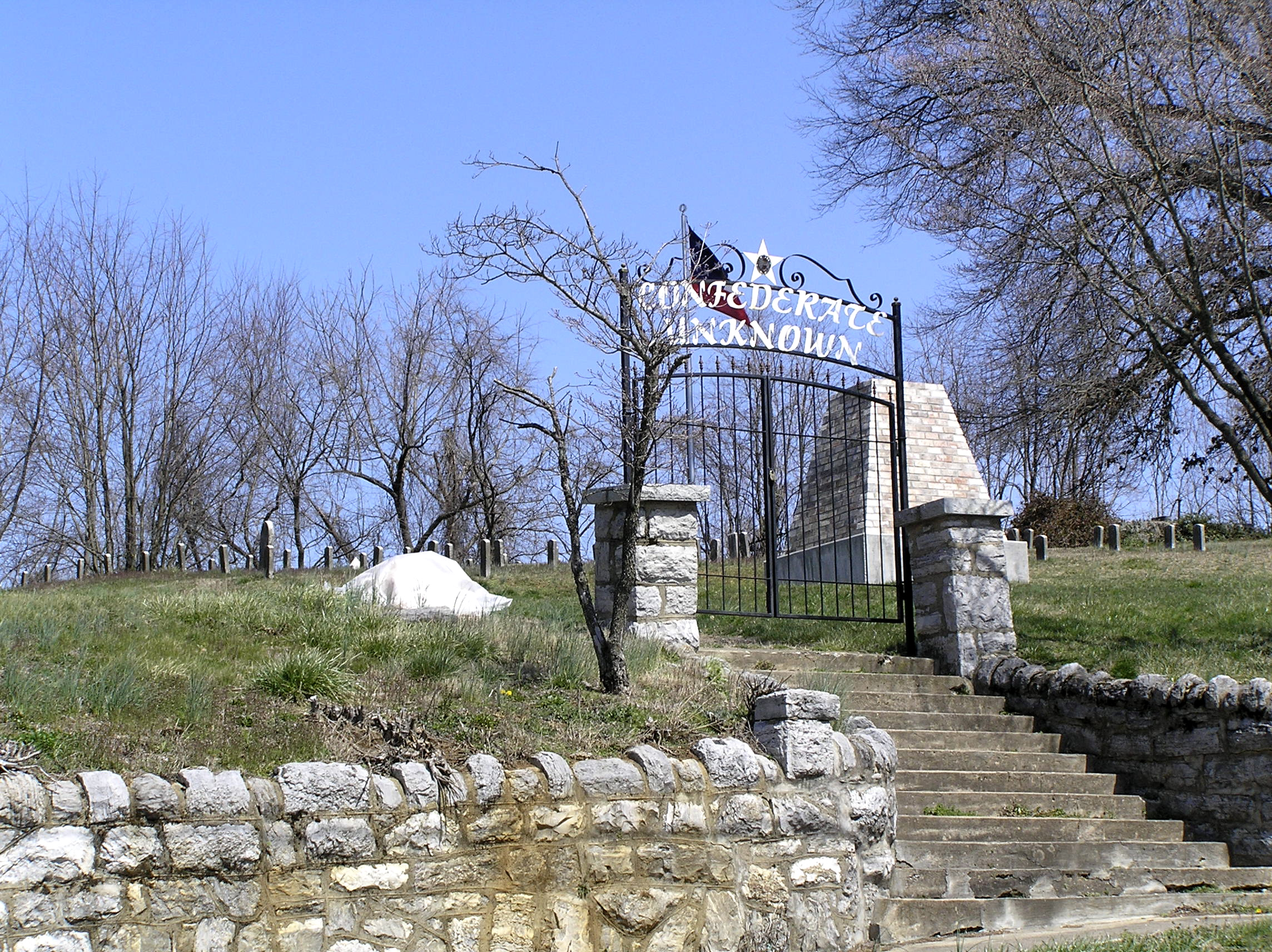
- Burial section of the Confederate unknown

- Location within Virginia Location within the United States
- Location: State Street, Bristol, Tennessee
- Coordinates: 36°35′39″N 82°10′16″W
- Area: 16.7 acres (6.8 ha)
- Built: 1857
- NRHP reference No.: 11000142
- VLR No.: 102-5028

Significant dates
- Added to NRHP: March 28, 2011
- Designated VLR: December 16, 2010

East Hill Cemetery, also known as Maryland Hill, Round Hill, Rooster Hill, and Bristol City Cemetery, is a historic cemetery mainly located in Bristol, Tennessee; part of the cemetery extends across the state border into Bristol, Virginia. It is an American Civil War-era cemetery established in 1857, with sections for Confederate soldiers and veterans as well as a small section for African American burials. In 1995, the United Daughters of the Confederacy put up a small commemorative monument to the Civil War dead. Among its graves are the founders of the city, representatives of enslaved African-Americans, Civil War soldiers including those who died as a result of the war as well as those who survived the war, a Revolutionary War General of Militia Evan Shelby, and many who have made contributions to Bristol and the nation. It straddles the Tennessee–Virginia border.

It was listed on the National Register of Historic Places in 2011.

== Notable burials ==
- Evan Shelby, Revolutionary War General of Militia, father of Isaac Shelby, first Governor of Kentucky
- Col. Abram Fulkerson, Virginia House of Delegates and Congressman

== See also ==
- List of cemeteries in Tennessee
