= Delap Cemetery =

Historic cemetery in Campbell County, Tennessee, US

- Interactive map of Delap Cemetery

Details
- Location: De Lap Lane, Campbell County, Tennessee
- Country: United States
- Coordinates: 36°21′01″N 84°09′43″W
- No. of graves: >150
- Find a Grave: Delap Cemetery

Delap Cemetery (or De Lap Cemetery) is a Civil War cemetery located on De Lap Lane (off Ellison Road) in Campbell County, Tennessee. It contains the graves of approximately 150 Confederate soldiers who died while camped near the base of Pine Mountain in the Jacksboro, Tennessee, area. The cemetery also family members from the nearby community of De Lap.

The soldiers included members of North Carolina's 58th Regiment of the Confederate Army. The regiment had been formed at Camp Martin in Mitchell County, North Carolina. They had traveled from Cumberland Gap to Jacksboro, and were assigned to guard Big Creek Gap. There were approximately 1,000 soldiers camped at Jacksboro. In addition to North Carolina, there were soldiers from Tennessee and Alabama.

The cemetery was kept up until the 1960s, but had fallen into disrepair. While the plot of land was known to be a cemetery due to the sunken graves, knowledge that it was a military burial ground had been lost. Since Campbell County was strongly pro-Union in sentiment, there was no knowledge of a C.S.A. burial ground. However, a North Carolina descendant of one of the soldiers visited Campbell County in December 2002 and produced documents verifying the deaths of 50 soldiers at the base of Pine Mountain. After her visit, the local community began work to clear the cemetery.

Fifty military tombstones have been set up at the cemetery. Tennessee’s Sons of Confederate Veterans’ Longstreeet–Zollicoffer Camp # 87 raised the funds for the tombstones. The cemetery was rededicated on June 11, 2005.

== See also ==
- List of cemeteries in Tennessee
