= Pleasant Hill Cemetery (Finley, Tennessee) =

Historic cemetery in Dyer County, Tennessee, US

- U.S. National Register of Historic Places
- Location within Tennessee Location within the United States
- Nearest city: Finley, Tennessee
- Coordinates: 36°02′47″N 89°29′01″W
- Area: 11 acres (4.5 ha)
- NRHP reference No.: 03001159
- Added to NRHP: November 13, 2003

Pleasant Hill Cemetery, also known as Old Finley Cemetery, is a historic cemetery in Finley, Tennessee. It was established circa 1852. Several veterans of the Confederate States Army during the American Civil War are buried here, including Nathaniel Pritchell of the 7th Tennessee Cavalry, Joseph J. Jackson of the 52nd Tennessee Infantry, and Elkanah Andrew Aldford of the 21st Virginia Cavalry. The cemetery also includes the graves of World War I veterans. It has been listed on the National Register of Historic Places since November 13, 2003.
