= 123rd Illinois Infantry Regiment =

123rd Regiment, Illinois Volunteer Infantry/Illinois Volunteer Mounted Infantry
- Illinois state flag
- Active: 1862–1865
- Disbanded: July 11, 1865
- Country: United States
- Allegiance: Union
- Branch: Infantry; Mounted Infantry (1863–1864)
- Equipment: Spencer repeating rifle
- Engagements: Battle of Perryville; Second Battle of Murfreesboro; Battle of Vaught's Hill; Battle of Hoover's Gap; Battle of Chickamauga; Battle of Farmington; Battle of Resaca; Battle of New Hope Church; Battle of Dallas; Battle of Marietta; Battle of Kennesaw Mountain; Battle of Ladiga; Battle of Selma

Insignia
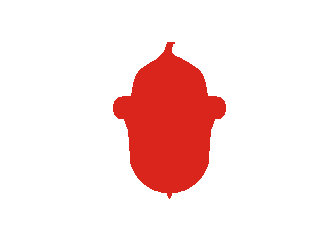
- 1st Division, XIV Corps

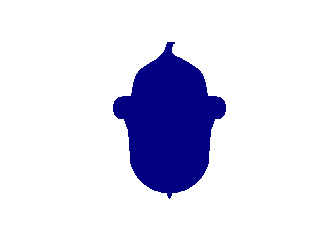
- 4th Division, XIV Corps

The 123rd Regiment Illinois Volunteer Infantry, was an infantry and mounted infantry regiment that served in the Union Army during the American Civil War. In 1863 and 1864 it was temporarily known as the 123rd Illinois Volunteer Mounted Infantry Regiment, as part of Wilder's Lightning Brigade. (Note: It acquired the names due to the movement speed that was gained by mounting the brigade, and also by the hatchets/tomohawks that Wilder had issued initially. See Lightning Brigade article for more.)

== Service ==
This regiment was organized at Camp Terry, Mattoon, Coles County, Illinois, by Colonel James Monroe, who at the time was major of the 7th Illinois Infantry. Companies A, C, D, H, I and K were from Coles County; B from Cumberland; E from Clark; F and G from Clark and Crawford. As a colonel in 1861, Ulysses S. Grant organized his first command, the 21st Illinois Volunteer Infantry Regiment, in Mattoon.

=== Initial infantry service ===
It was mustered into service on September 6, 1862, with James Monroe as Colonel, Jonathan Biggs, of Westfield, Clark County, as Lieutenant Colonel, and James A. Connolly, of Charleston, Illinois, as Major. On 19 September 1862, the Regiment was loaded into freight cars at Mattoon, and transported to Louisville, Kentucky, where it was at once put to work, under Major General William "Bull" Nelson, to fortify the city against Confederate General Braxton Bragg, who was then advancing on it in pursuit of Union General Don Carlos Buell.

On October 1, having been assigned to the Thirty-third Brigade (General William R. Terrill), Fourth Division (General James S. Jackson), in McCook's Corps, the regiment started on the march under Buell, southward through Kentucky, after Bragg, who had turned back, and up to this time the regiment never had battalion drill, and hardly an attempt at company drill, as all the officers, except the colonel, were "raw recruits".

Just 19 days after leaving Mattoon, the regiment engaged in the Battle of Perryville, where 36 men were killed in action and 180 wounded. Generals Terrill and Jackson were both killed immediately behind and within twenty feet of the line of the regiment. Among the wounded were Captain Coblentz of Company E, First Lieutenant S. M. Shepard of Company A and Adjutant Leander H. Hamlin. Following the devastating bloodshed the 123rd was assigned to protect the railroad bridge across the Green River at Munfordville, Kentucky, in November and December 1862. It has become known as the "Battle for the Bridge," which began when the Union garrison led by John T. Wilder, prior to his assuming command of the 123rd, surrendered during the Battle of Munfordville.

The 123rd was initially assigned to the Army of the Ohio from September 1862 to November 1862, and then to the Army of the Cumberland from November 1862 to June 1865. The commanding general of the Army of the Cumberland was William Rosecrans. The regiment was in the 1st Brigade with Colonel Albert S. Hall, which was part of the 5th Division commanded by Brigadier General Joseph J. Reynolds, reporting to Major General George Henry Thomas.

=== Conversion to mounted infantry ===
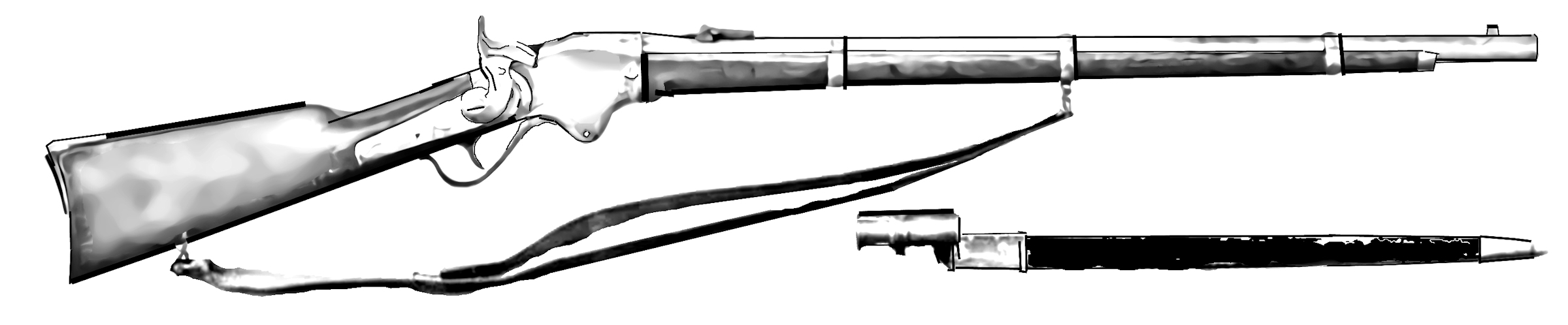
An 1862 Spencer Rifle with sling and bayonet. As part of the "Wilder Lightning Brigade" the 17th was among the first units fighting in the Civil War to receive the Spencer repeating rifle.

In February and March 1863, it was converted to mounted infantry. The 123rd Illinois' brigade became known as "Wilder's Lightning Brigade" commanded by Wilder. The brigade remained the 1st Brigade of the 5th Division, XIV Army Corps after its conversion. During this conversion, Spencer repeating rifles, invented by Christopher Spencer, were adopted as the command's primary weapon.

The new increase in firepower that the Spencer gave, allowed the 123rd and its brigade mates to see off numerically superior Confederate infantry and cavalry in several engagements. The weapon was estimated to allow the regiment to deliver five to seven times the firepower of muzzle-loading opponents.

=== Tullahoma campaign ===
The 123rd first used its new rifles in the Battle of Hoover's Gap. The brigade showed the advantage of their speed despite the weather by reaching the gap nearly 9 miles ahead of Thomas's main body. Despite orders from the divisional commander, General Joseph J. Reynolds to fall back to his infantry, which was still six miles away, Wilder decided to take and hold the position.

The brigade surprised Confederate Colonel J. Russell Butler's 1st (3rd) Kentucky Cavalry Regiment at the entrance of the gap. After driving them through the gap, the brigade found it outnumbered four-to-one. The brigade entrenched and held this position. The brigade, supported by Brig. Gen. Bushrod Johnson's brigade and some artillery, assaulted Wilder's position, but was driven back by the concentrated fire of the Spencers, losing 146 killed and wounded (almost a quarter of his force) to Wilder's 61. Colonel James Connolly, commander of the 123rd Illinois, wrote:

As soon as the enemy opened on us with their artillery we dismounted and formed line of battle on a hill just at the south entrance to the "Gap," and our battery of light artillery was opened on them, a courier was dispatched to the rear to hurry up reinforcements, our horses were sent back some distance out of the way of bursting shells, our regiment was assigned to support the battery, the other three regiments were properly disposed, and not a moment too soon, for these preparations were scarcely completed when the enemy opened on us a terrific fire of shot and shell from five different points, and their masses of infantry, with flags flying, moved out of the woods on our right in splendid style; there were three or four times our number already in sight and still others came pouring out of the woods beyond. Our regiment lay on the hill side in mud and water, the rain pouring down in torrents, while each shell screamed so close to us as to make it seem that the next would tear us to pieces.

Presently the enemy got near enough to us to make a charge on our battery, and on they came; our men are on their feet in an instant and a terrible fire from the "Spencers" causes the advancing regiment to reel and its colors fall to the ground, but in an instant their colors are up again and on they come, thinking to reach the battery before our guns can be reloaded, but they "reckoned without their host," they didn't know we had the "Spencers," and their charging yell was answered by another terrible volley, and another and another without cessation, until the poor regiment was literally cut to pieces, and but few men of that 20th Tennessee that attempted the charge will ever charge again. During all the rest of the fight at "Hoover's Gap" they never again attempted to take that battery. After the charge they moved four regiments around to our right and attempted to get in our rear, but they were met by two of our regiments posted in the woods, and in five minutes were driven back in the greatest disorder, with a loss of 250 killed and wounded. (Note: The regiment served quite well through the remainder of the campaign.)

=== Chickamauga campaign ===
During the calamitous Chickamauga Campaign|Tullahoma Campaign, the 123rd and the rest of the Lightning Brigade, were one of the few positive results. The 123rd was sent to defend Alexander's Bridge over the Chickamauga on 17 September. The next day, 18 September, the Lightning Brigade blocked the crossing against the approach of W.H.T. Walker's Corps. Feeling quite confident in the advantage their Spencer repeating rifles gave them, the brigade held off a brigade of Brig. Gen. St. John Liddell's division, which suffered 105 casualties against Wilder's superior firepower.

At around 14:00 on 19 September, the 123rd and its brigade spoiled the left column of the main rebel attack by severely mauling both Brig. Gen. John Gregg's brigade and Brig. Gen. Evander McNair's brigade. The attacking Confederates were surprised by the resolute, confident manner that the Lightning Brigade demonstrated in driving them back.

=== Post Chickamauga ===
During the Siege of Chattanooga, the Lightning Brigade disbanded, and four of its regiments shifted to the Cavalry Corps where they served for the remainder of the war. The 123rd and the 72nd Indiana were sent to the 3rd Brigade of the 2nd Division. Late in the war, the regiment pursued Confederate General John Bell Hood. The unit was instrumental in the capture of former Confederate capital Montgomery, Alabama.

During the Battle of Selma, First Lieutenant O. J. McManus, Sergeants J. S. Mullen and Henry E. Cross, Corporal McMurry and Privates Daniel Cook, John Bowman, Marion White and Henry Woodruff were killed, with 50 wounded, including Lieutenant Colonel Biggs, Adjutant L. B. Bane, Captains W. E. Adams and Owen Wiley, Lieutenants Alex. McNutt and J. R. Harding. In June 1865 new recruits and some veterans were transferred to the 61st Regiment as the 123rd prepared to disband. Those who remained were mustered out June 27, 1865, by Captain L. M. Hosea and formally discharged at Springfield, Illinois, on July 11, 1865.

== Total strength and casualties ==
The regiment lost during service three officers and 82 enlisted men killed and mortally wounded and one officer and 133 enlisted men by disease for a total of 219.

== Commanders ==
Colonel James Monroe: September 6, 1862 – October 7, 1863 (killed at the Battle of Farmington)
Brigadier General of Volunteers James S. Jackson: October 1, 1862 – October 8, 1862 (killed at the Battle of Perryville)
Brigadier General of Volunteers William R. Terrill: September 9, 1862 – October 8, 1862 (killed at the Battle of Perryville)
Lt. Colonel James A. Connolly
Captain Oscar R. Bane
Colonel John T. Wilder: May 6, 1863 – November 1864 (resignation)
Brigadier General Kenner Garrard: May 20, 1864 – October 28, 1864
Major General James H. Wilson: October 28, 1864 – June 27, 1865

== Officers ==
- Surgeon John Milton Phipps, July 2, 1863 – March 30, 1864.
- Sergeant John Hamilton Morgan

== Armament/Equipment/Uniform ==
=== Armament ===
The 123rd Illinois was an 1862, three-year regiment, that greatly increased the number of men under arms in the federal army. As with many of these volunteers, initially, there were not enough Model 1861 Springfield Rifles either NA (Note: In government records, National Armory refers to one of three United States Armory and Arsenals, the Springfield Armory, the Harpers Ferry Armory, and the Rock Island Arsenal. Rifle-muskets, muskets, and rifles were manufactured in Springfield and Harper's Ferry before the war. When the Rebels destroyed the Harpers Ferry Armory early in the American Civil War and stole the machinery for the Richmond Arsenal, the Springfield Armory was briefly the only government manufacturer of arms, until the Rock Island Arsenal was established in 1862. During this time production ramped up to unprecedented levels ever seen in American manufacturing up until that time, with only 9,601 rifles manufactured in 1860, rising to a peak of 276,200 by 1864. These advancements would not only give the Union a decisive technological advantage over the Confederacy during the war but served as a precursor to the mass production manufacturing that contributed to the post-war Second Industrial Revolution and 20th century machine manufacturing capabilities. American historian Merritt Roe Smith has drawn comparisons between the early assembly machining of the Springfield rifles and the later production of the Ford Model T, with the latter having considerably more parts, but producing a similar numbers of units in the earliest years of the 1913–1915 automobile assembly line, indirectly due to mass production manufacturing advancements pioneered by the armory 50 years earlier.) or contract manufactured, to go around so they were also issued imported Austrian Rifle Muskets (Note: The Lorenz rifle was the third most widely used rifle during the American Civil War. The Union recorded purchases of 226,924. Its quality was inconsistent. Some were considered to be of the finest quality (particularly ones from the Vienna Arsenal), and were sometimes praised as being superior to the Enfield; others, especially those in later purchases from private contractors, were described as horrible in both design and condition. Lorenz rifles in the Civil War were generally used with .54 caliber cartridges designed for the Model 1841 "Mississippi" rifle. These differed from the cartridges manufactured in Austria and may have contributed to the unreliability of the weapons. Many of the rifles were bored out to .58 caliber to accommodate standard Springfield rifle ammunition.) Initially an infantry unit that served in the Army of Ohio, they then joined the Army of the Cumberland at the new year in 1863. They reported the following on o0rdnance surveys:

- 4th Quarter 1862 Quarterly Ordnance Survey &mdash 413 Austrian Rifle Muskets, leaf and block sights, Quadrangular bayonet (.58 Cal), 96 Springfield Model 1855/1861 National Armory (NA) and contract (.58 Cal.)
- 1st Quarter 1863 Quarterly Ordnance Survey &mdash 454 Austrian Rifle Muskets, leaf and block sights, Quadrangular bayonet (.58 Cal), 44 Springfield Model 1855/1861 National Armory (NA) and contract (.58 Cal.)

During the spring of 1863, the regiment was converted to mounted infantry, and on May 6, it received Spencer rifle. As it transitioned into a more normal cavalry role, it exchanged some of its Spencer rifles for the shorter Spancer carbine. They reported the following numbers in the ordnance surveys:

- 2nd Quarter 1863 Quarterly Ordnance Survey &mdash 166 Spencer rifles (.52 Cal), 11 Austrian Rifle Muskets, leaf and block sights, Quadrangular bayonet (.58 Cal)
- 3rd Quarter 1863 Quarterly Ordnance Survey &mdash 280 Spencer rifles (.52 Cal), 2 Austrian Rifle Muskets, leaf and block sights, Quadrangular bayonet (.58 Cal)
- 4th Quarter 1863 Quarterly Ordnance Survey &mdash 217 Spencer rifles (.52 Cal)
- 2nd Quarter 1863 Quarterly Ordnance Survey &mdash 279 Spencer rifles (.52 Cal), 76 Spencer carbines (.52 Cal)
Issued weapons

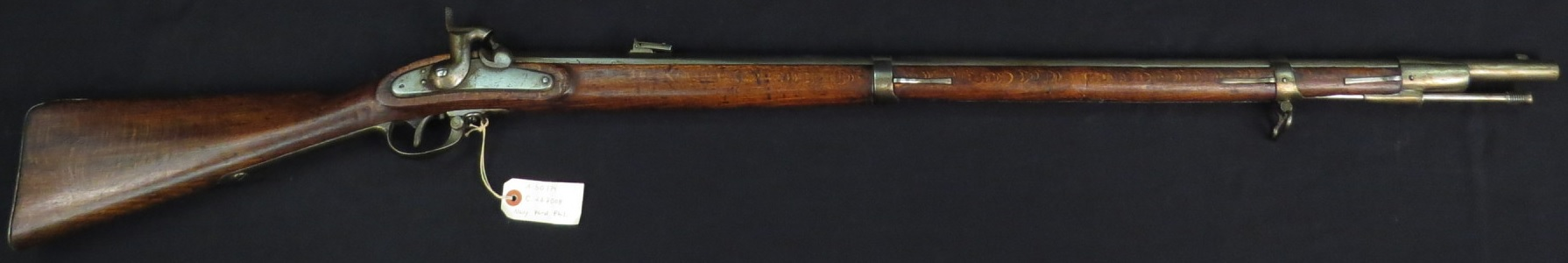
Lorenz Rifle Model 1854

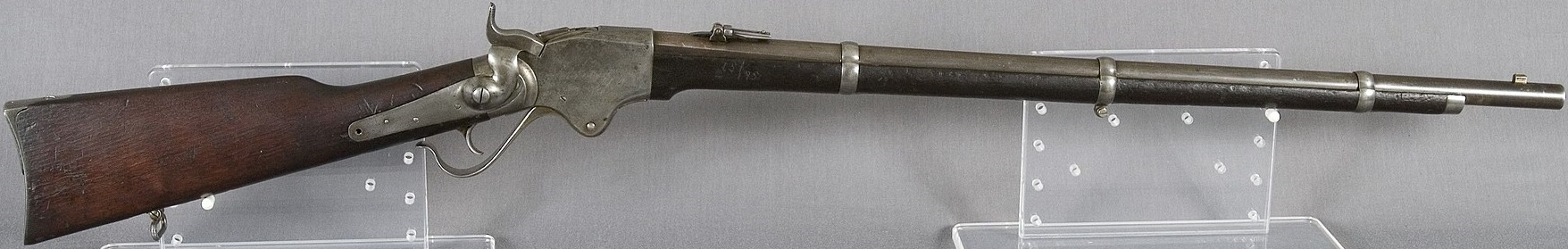
M1862 Spencer rifle

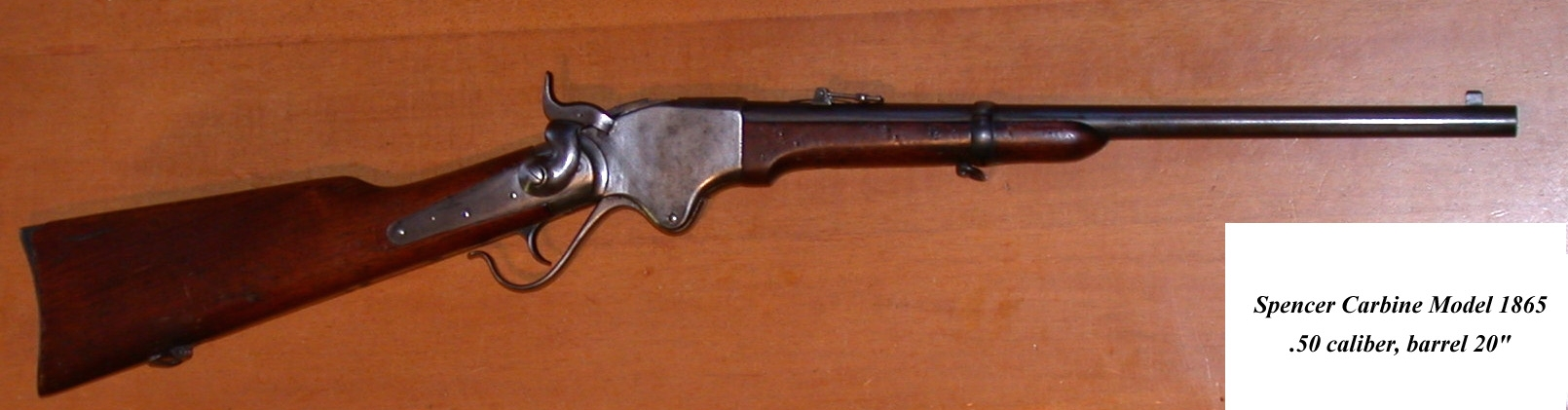
Spencer seven-shot carbine, issued weapon

=== Uniforms ===
The 123rd Illinois had come into Wilder's brigade as a replacement for the 75th Indiana, but, like the other regiments, it wanted to move and fight as mounted infantry. In March, they received new hats, standard Federal cavalry jackets trimmed in yellow (and a small amount of the prewar green trimmed mounted rifle version), and reinforced mounted trousers. The men promptly removed the yellow piping from the jackets and trousers, although some kept the green rifle trimming. Like most of the western U.S. volunteers, an undecorated 1858 Hardee hat or black civilian slouch hat was the normal headgear.

== See also ==
- List of Illinois Civil War Units
- Illinois in the American Civil War
