= Farmington, Tennessee =

- Unincorporated community
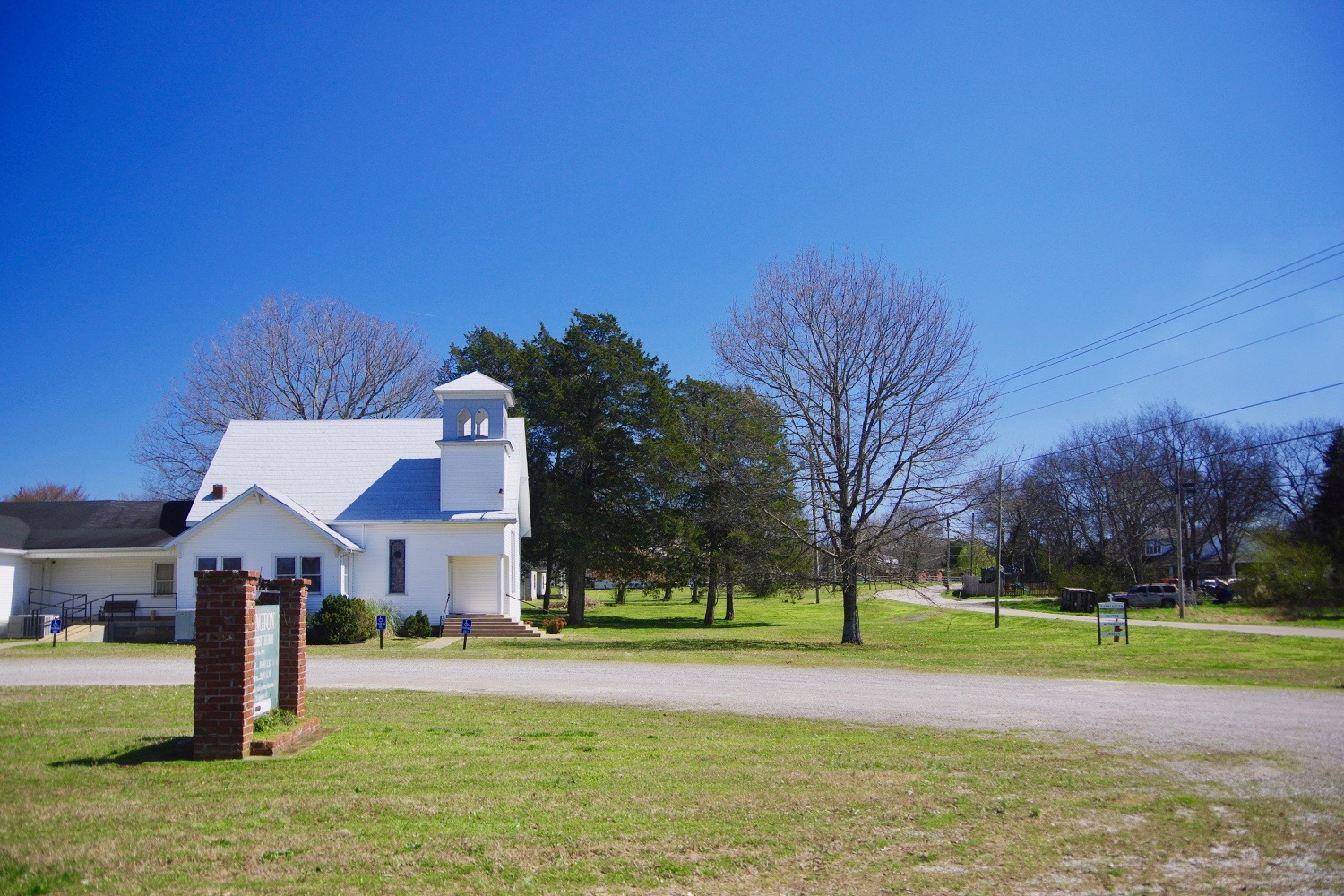
- Church in Farmington

- Location within Tennessee Location within the United States
- Coordinates: 35°30′04″N 86°42′39″W
- Country: United States
- State: Tennessee
- County: Marshall
- Elevation: 689 ft (210 m)
- Time zone: UTC-6 (Central (CST))
  - Summer (DST): UTC-5 (CDT)
- ZIP code: 37091
- Area code: 931
- GNIS feature ID: 1284147

Farmington is an unincorporated community in Marshall County, in the U.S. state of Tennessee. The community is concentrated around the intersection of U.S. Route 31 and State Route 64 west of Shelbyville and east of Lewisburg.

== History ==
A post office called Farmington was established in 1836, and remained in operation until 1902. Farmington was so named for its location in a farming district.

The community witnessed the Battle of Farmington of 1863, which resulted in a Union victory.

== See also ==
- Confederate Cemetery Monument
