= 121st Indiana Infantry Regiment =

"Military unit", "Indiana", "Cavalry", "American Civil War", "Eli Lilly"

9th Indiana Cavalry Regiment 121st Indiana Infantry Regiment
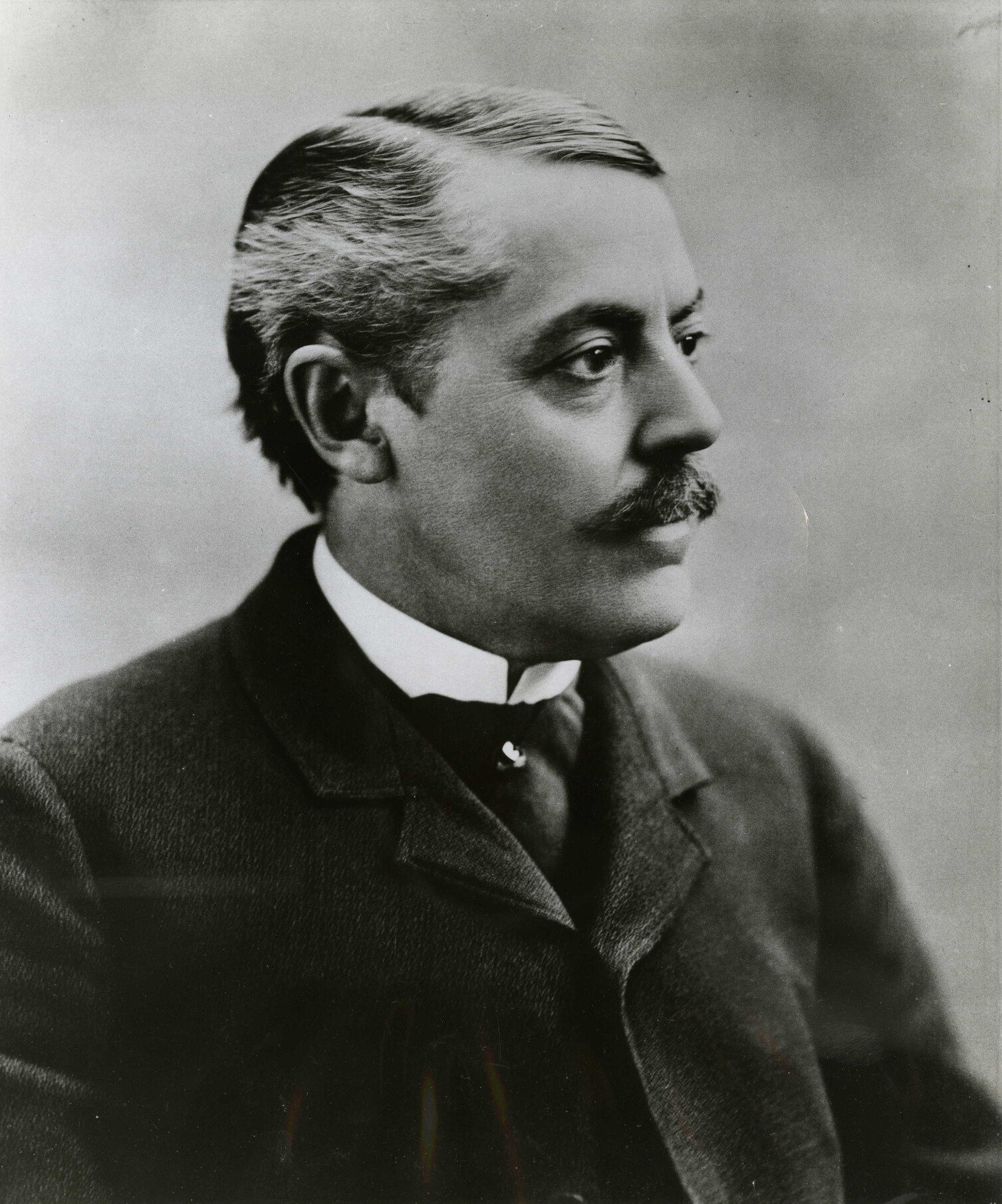
- Eli Lilly served as the Major of the 9th Indiana Cavalry from 1864-1865 before being promoted to Colonel.
- Active: December 7, 1863 - August 28, 1865
- Country: United States
- Allegiance: Union Army
- Branch: Infantry & Cavalry
- Engagements: American Civil War: Battle of Sulphur Creek Trestle; Franklin-Nashville Campaign; Battle of Nashville; Battle of West Harpeth; Battle of Hollow Tree Gap; Battle of Anthony's Hill; Skirmish at Lynnville; Battle of Sugar Creek; Wilson's Raid

Commanders
- Colonel: George W. Jackson
- Colonel: Eli Lilly

The 121st Indiana Infantry Regiment was an infantry regiment which fought for the Union Army during the American Civil War. Although the regiment was originally designated as infantry, the regiment was later converted to Cavalry and redesignated as the 9th Indiana Cavalry Regiment.

== Service ==
The 121st Indiana Regiment, later the 9th Indiana Cavalry, was organized in Indianapolis on December 7, 1863, to March 29, 1864. The regiment left Indiana and traveled to Pulaski, Tennessee on May 3, 1864, and was attached to the District of North Alabama as part of the Army of the Cumberland. The regiment was posted at Pulaski until November 23, 1864. While at Pulaski the regiment skirmished with Confederate troops at Florence, Alabama on September 1 and 12, 1864 at Elk River on September 2, 1864, and at Lynnville, Tennessee on September 4, 1864. The regiment was heavily involved in the Battle of Sulphur Creek Trestle, the regiment's first battle during the Franklin–Nashville campaign.

The regiment did not fight again until the Battle of Nashville from December 15–16, 1864 and later took part in the pursuit of John Bell Hood's army across the West Harpeth River where it engaged Confederate troops at the Battle of Harpeth and the Battle of Hollow Tree Gap. The regiment later took part in the Battle of Anthony's Hill, a skirmish at Lynnville, Tennessee and the Battle of Sugar Creek near the county line of Giles County and Lawrence County, Tennessee. The regiment's final engagement was Wilson's Raid into Alabama and Georgia.

From February 6 to March 10, 1864, the regiment was moved to Vicksburg, Mississippi and New Orleans for provost duty. The regiment return to Vicksburg where it was garrisoned from March 25 until May 3. Expedition from Rodney to Port Gibson May 3–6. Garrison duty at various points in Mississippi May 3 to August 22. Mustered out August 28, 1865.

Original Organization of Regiment
Company	Primary Place of Recruitment	Earliest Captain
A	Marion County	James C. Hervey
B	Hancock County,	William R. Walls
C	Wayne County and Fayette County	Benjamin F. Brown
D	Union County	Patrick Carland
E	Henry County and Rush County	Volney Hobson
F	Marion, Johnson, Rush and Boone Counties	Nathaniel J. Owings
G	Delaware County	James Rariden Nation
H	Shelby, Marion, and Johnson Counties	William H. Hyden
I	Hendricks and Marion Counties	Virgil H. Lyon
K	Dearborn County	George R. Brumblay
L	Randolph, Marion, Johnson and Delaware Counties	Albert Morehous
M	Rush County	James H. Frazee

== Casualties ==
The 121st Indiana Infantry (9th Indiana Cavalry) lost a total of 236 men: 4 Officers and 28 Enlisted men killed in action and mortally wounded and 204 Enlisted men by disease.

== Commanders ==
- William S. McClure: Declined command.
- George W. Jackson: April 14, 1864 - June 3, 1865 after his resignation.
- Eli Lilly: June 1865 - August 25, 1865.

== Notable people ==
- Daniel Webster Comstock: Served as a Regimental Sergeant Major, First Lieutenant, Captain, and acting assistant Adjutant General in the military division of Mississippi.
- Eli Lilly: Before joining the 121st Indiana Infantry Regiment (9th Indiana Cavalry) Lilly had previously served with the 21st Indiana Infantry Regiment (1st Heavy Artillery) before resigning his officer's commission in order to raise the 18th Independent Battery Indiana Light Artillery or "Lilly's Battery" which fought with distinction at the Battle of Chickamauga and was part of John T. Wilder's Lightning Brigade. In the postwar era Lilly founded the Eli Lilly and Company.
- William V. Wheeler: Served as a private in Company D of the 9th Indiana Cavalry. Wheeler was later promoted to the rank of Corporal. Wheeler went on to found the Wheeler Mission Ministries of Indianapolis, Indiana.
- James Wolverton: A naturalist who came to prominence naming the General Sherman Tree in the Sequoia National Park. Wolverton had previously served as a Lieutenant in the 9th Indiana.
- Nathaniel J. Owings: Owings enlisted as a captain and commanded Company F until being promoted to the rank of Major. Owings son, Nathaniel A. Owings became a famous architect and one of the founding members of Skidmore, Owings & Merrill LLP, also known as SOM.
