= Ralimetinib =

Chemical compound

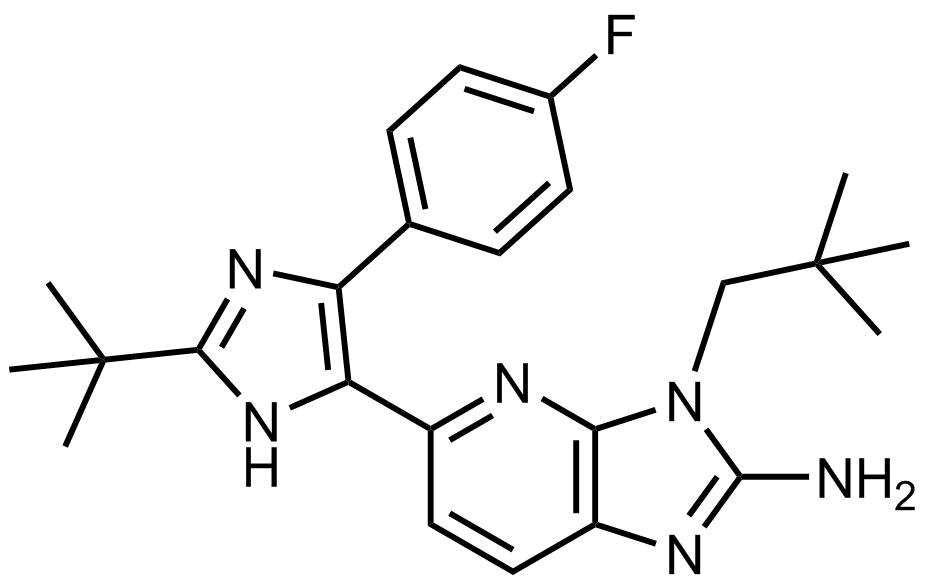
- Ralimetinib structural formula

Clinical data
- Other names: LY2228820
- Routes of administration: PO
- ATC code: none

Identifiers
- IUPAC name: 5-[2-tert-Butyl-4-(4-fluorophenyl)-1H-imidazol-5-yl]-3-(2,2-dimethylpropyl)imidazo[4,5-b]pyridin-2-amine
- CAS Number: 862505-00-8
- PubChem CID: 11539025
- ChemSpider: 9713805
- UNII: 73I34XW4HD
- KEGG: D10658
- CompTox Dashboard (EPA): DTXSID00235456

Chemical and physical data
- Formula: C_{24}H_{29}FN_{6}
- Molar mass: 420.536 g·mol^{−1}
- 3D model (JSmol): Interactive image
- SMILES: C12C(=CC=C(N=1)C1=C(N=C(N1)C(C)(C)C)C1C=CC(=CC=1)F)N=C(N2CC(C)(C)C)N
- InChI: InChI=1S/C24H29FN6/c1-23(2,3)13-31-20-17(28-22(31)26)12-11-16(27-20)19-18(14-7-9-15(25)10-8-14)29-21(30-19)24(4,5)6/h7-12H,13H2,1-6H3,(H2,26,28)(H,29,30); Key:XPPBBJCBDOEXDN-UHFFFAOYSA-N

Ralimetinib (LY2228820) is a small molecule experimental cancer drug in development by Eli Lilly. Although originally thought to be a p38 mitogen-activated protein kinase (MAPK) inhibitor, it has since been reported that it acts instead as an epidermal growth factor receptor (EGFR) inhibitor.

A phase II trial for treatment of ovarian cancer has completed.
