= 12th Missouri Infantry Regiment =

12th Missouri Infantry Regiment may refer to:

- 12th Missouri Infantry Regiment (Confederate), a Confederate regiment in the American Civil War
- 12th Missouri Infantry Regiment (Union), a Union regiment in the American Civil War

== See also ==
- 12th Missouri Cavalry Regiment
