= Edward P. Allen =

American politician & lawyer (1839–1909)

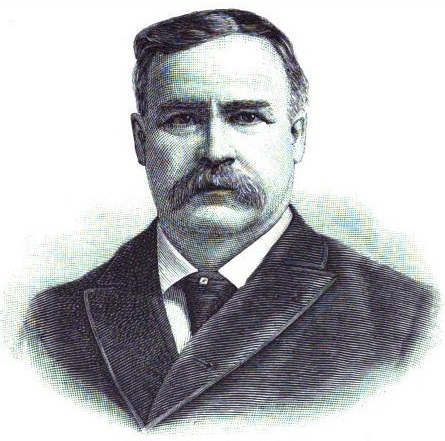

Member of the U.S. House of Representatives from Michigan's 2nd district
- In office March 4, 1887 – March 3, 1891
- Preceded by: Nathaniel B. Eldredge
- Succeeded by: James S. Gorman

Member of the Michigan House of Representatives from the Washtenaw County 1st district
- In office January 1, 1877 – December 31, 1880

Mayor of Ypsilanti
- In office 1899–1900
- Preceded by: Don Louis Davis
- Succeeded by: Henry R. Scoville
- In office 1880–1881
- Preceded by: Lambert A. Barnes
- Succeeded by: Henry R. Scoville

Personal details
- Born: Edward Payson Allen; October 28, 1839 Sharon Township, Michigan, U.S.
- Died: November 25, 1909 (aged 70) Ypsilanti, Michigan, U.S.
- Resting place: Highland Cemetery, Ypsilanti
- Party: Republican
- Education: University of Michigan Law School

Military service
- Allegiance: United States
- Branch/service: United States Army
- Years of service: 1864–1865
- Rank: Captain
- Unit: 29th Michigan Volunteer Infantry Regiment
- Battles/wars: U.S. Civil War

Edward Payson Allen (October 28, 1839 – November 25, 1909) was an American Civil War veteran and politician from the U.S. state of Michigan. He served two terms in the United States House of Representatives from 1887 to 1891.

== Early years ==
Allen was born in Sharon Township, Michigan, on October 28, 1839, and attended the district and select schools. Until his twentieth year his time was divided between farm labor in summer and attending and teaching school in winter. He graduated from the State normal school (now Eastern Michigan University) in 1864, going thence to Vassar, Michigan, where for three months he taught the Union School.

=== Civil War ===
In June, 1864, near the end of the American Civil War, Allen enlisted and helped to raise a company for the Twenty-ninth Regiment, Michigan Volunteer Infantry, he was commissioned first lieutenant in September 1864 and before the close of the war, he was promoted to a captaincy. He mustered out with his regiment in September 1865.

== Career ==
Allen graduated from the law school of University of Michigan at Ann Arbor in March 1867 and was admitted to the bar, commenced practice in co-partnership with the Hon. B. M. Cutcheon in Ypsilanti. He became assistant assessor of internal revenue in 1869 and prosecuting attorney of Washtenaw County in 1872. He was alderman of Ypsilanti 1872-1874 and was elected to the Michigan State House of Representatives in 1876 and again in 1878, at which time he was elected speaker pro tempore. He was mayor of Ypsilanti in 1880 and was appointed United States Indian agent for Michigan in August 1882, serving until December 1885.

Allen lost his first election for the United States House of Representatives in 1884. In 1886, Allen was elected as a Republican from Michigan's 2nd congressional district for the Fiftieth and Fifty-first Congresses, serving from March 4, 1887, to March 3, 1891. He was an unsuccessful candidate for reelection in 1890 to the Fifty-second Congress.

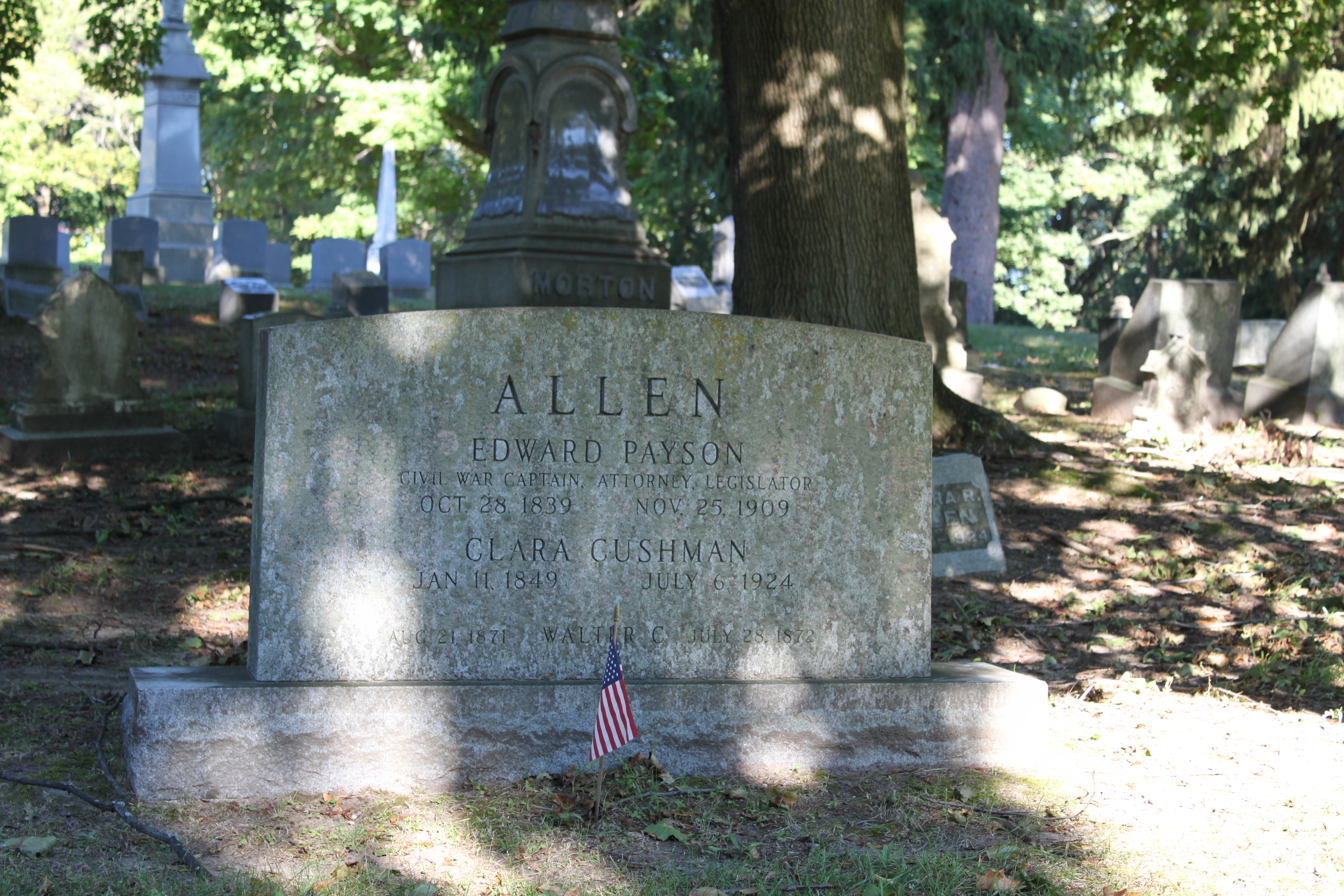
Allen grave

== Last years ==
After leaving Congress, Allen resumed the practice of law and was a member of the State board of agriculture 1897-1903 and was again mayor of Ypsilanti in 1899 and 1900. He was a member of the State soldiers’ home board 1903–1909. Allen died from a stroke in Ypsilanti and is interred in Highland Cemetery there.

U.S. House of Representatives
Preceded by Nathaniel B. Eldredge	United States Representative for the 2nd congressional district of Michigan; 1887– 1891	Succeeded by James S. Gorman
