= Sulphur Trestle Fort Site =

Historic archaeological site in Alabama, United States

- U.S. National Register of Historic Places
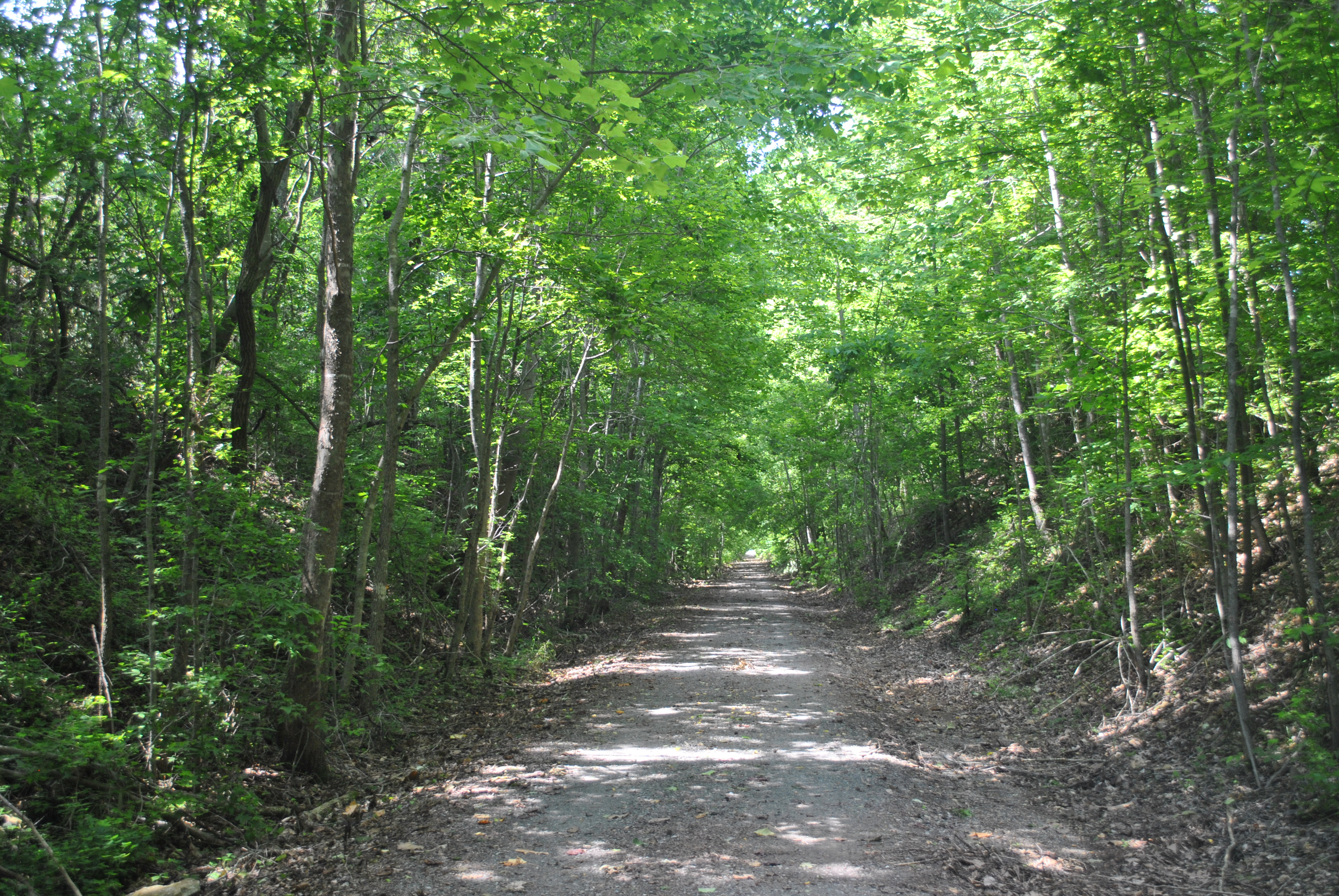
- The site in June 2011

- Location within Alabama Location within the United States
- Nearest city: Elkmont, Alabama
- Coordinates: 34°54′40″N 86°58′13″W
- Area: 5 acres (2.0 ha)
- Built: 1864
- NRHP reference No.: 73000355
- Added to NRHP: May 8, 1973

The Sulphur Trestle Fort Site is a historic Civil War battle site near Elkmont, Alabama. The fort was the site of the Battle of Sulphur Creek Trestle on September 25, 1864. After defeating Union Army forces and recapturing Athens, Alabama, Confederate General Nathan Bedford Forrest moved north to attempt to destroy a key railroad trestle. The trestle was defended by a fortification manned by 1000 Union soldiers. Forrest's troops easily defeated the Union forces and burned the trestle. Today, about 400 yards (370 m) of trenches dug around the outside of the fort's parapet remain. The site was listed on the National Register of Historic Places in 1973.
