= Nathaniel B. Eldredge =

Union Army officer, politician

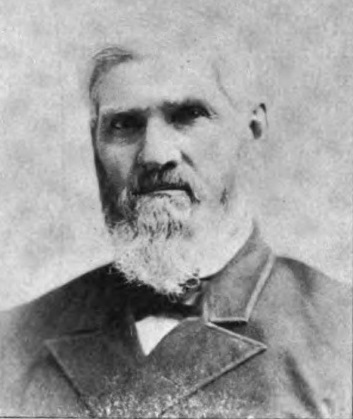
- From 1893's Illustrated History and Biographical Record of Lenawee County, Michigan.

Member of the U.S. House of Representatives from Michigan's 2nd district
- In office March 4, 1883 – March 3, 1887
- Preceded by: Edwin Willits
- Succeeded by: Edward P. Allen

Personal details
- Born: March 28, 1813 Auburn, New York, U.S.
- Died: November 27, 1893 (aged 80) Adrian, Michigan, U.S.
- Party: Democratic

Nathaniel Buel Eldredge (March 28, 1813 – November 27, 1893) was a physician, infantry officer, lawyer, sheriff, and ultimately a two-term Democratic congressman from the State of Michigan.

== Biography ==
Eldredge was born in Auburn, New York, and as he grew up, attended the common schools. He attended Fairfield Medical College and engaged in the practice of medicine in Commerce, Michigan.

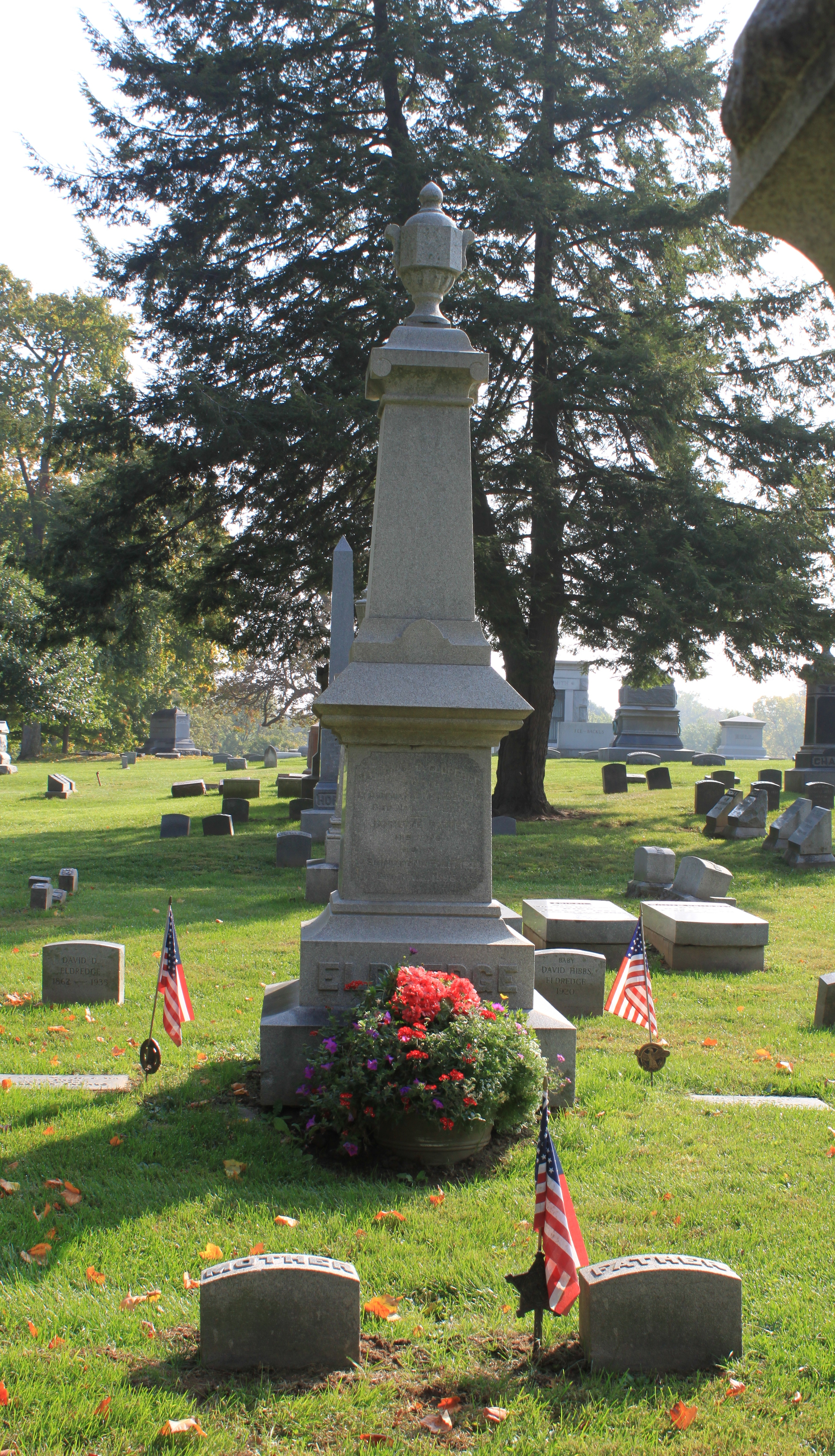
Eldredge grave

He served as clerk of the Michigan Senate in 1845 and was a member of the Michigan State House of Representatives from Lapeer County in 1848. He served as probate judge from 1852 to 1856. He studied law, was admitted to the bar and commenced practice in 1854. Soon after the outbreak of the American Civil War, Eldredge enrolled on June 19, 1861 as captain of Company G of the 7th Michigan Volunteer Infantry Regiment. He resigned his commission in December 1861, then re-entered the service with the 11th Michigan Volunteer Infantry Regiment. Commissioned as a lieutenant colonel on April 1, 1862, he was honorably discharged on January 7, 1863. He was elected sheriff of Lenawee County in 1874.

In 1882, Eldredge was elected as a Democrat to represent Michigan's 2nd congressional district in the 48th United States Congress, defeating Republican Edward P. Allen. Eldredge's victory was part of the first postwar Democratic landslide. Eldredge was reelected two years later, serving in the 49th United States Congress, where he was chairman of the Committee on Pensions. In all, he served from March 4, 1883 to March 3, 1887.

Eldredge died in Adrian, Michigan and was interred there in Oakwood Cemetery.

U.S. House of Representatives
Preceded by Edwin Willits	United States Representative for the 2nd congressional district of Michigan; 1883–1887	Succeeded by Edward P. Allen
