= Henry C. Smith (politician) =

American politician

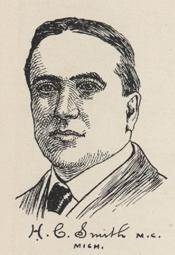
- Henry C. Smith

Member of the U.S. House of Representatives from Michigan's 2nd district
- In office March 4, 1899 – March 3, 1903
- Preceded by: George Spalding
- Succeeded by: Charles E. Townsend

Personal details
- Born: June 2, 1856 Canandaigua, New York, U.S.
- Died: December 7, 1911 (aged 55) Adrian, Michigan, U.S.
- Party: Republican
- Education: Adrian College

Henry Cassorte Smith (June 2, 1856 – December 7, 1911) was a politician from the U.S. state of Michigan. Smith was born in Canandaigua, New York and in the following year moved with his father to a farm near Palmyra, Michigan. He attended the common schools and graduated from Adrian College in 1878. He taught school, studied law, and was admitted to the bar on September 25, 1880. He commenced practice in Adrian where he became city attorney.

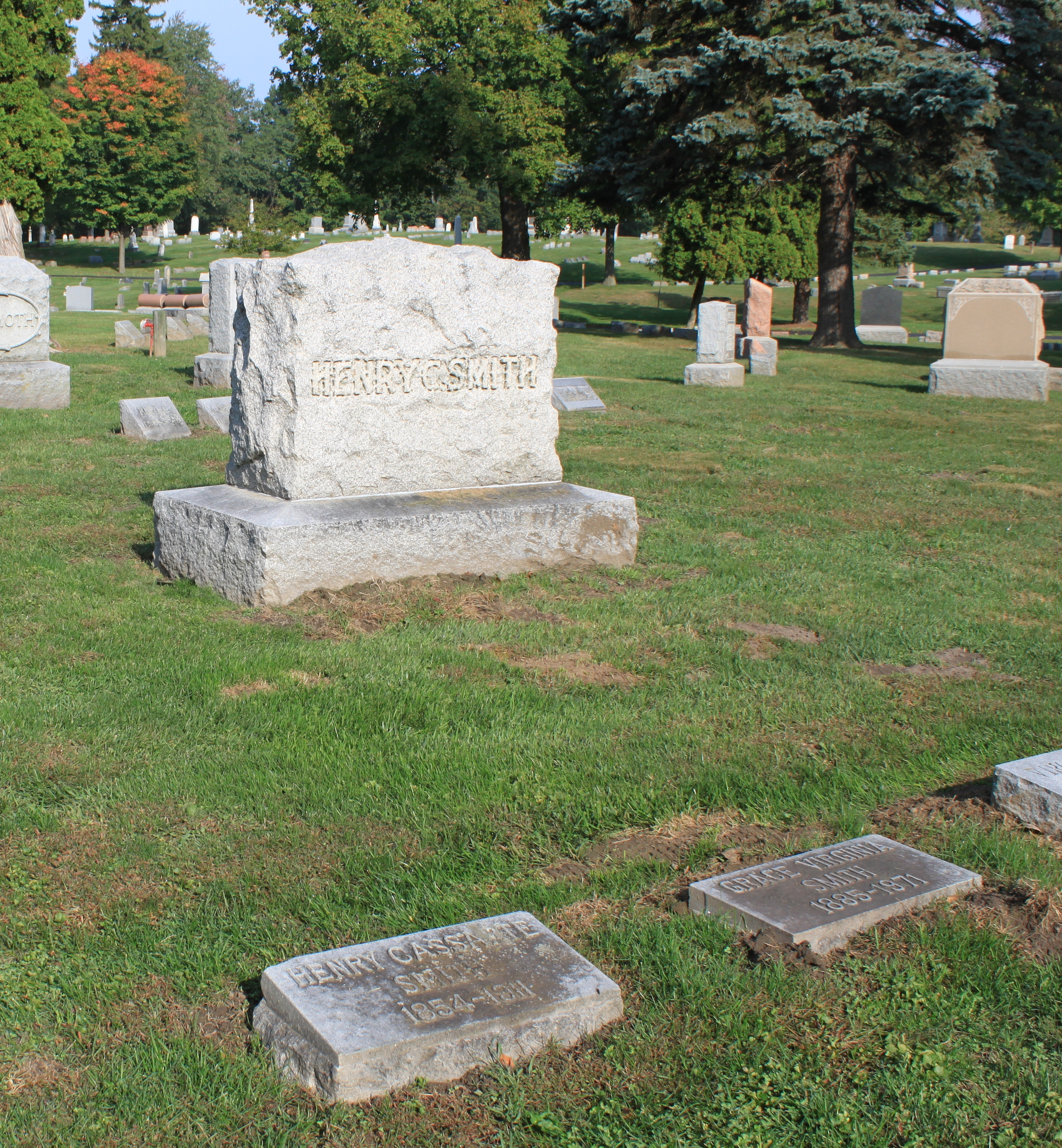
Smith grave. His headstone spells his middle name as "CASSARTE" and gives the year of birth as 1854

Smith was a delegate to the 1896 Republican National Convention. Two years later he was elected as a Republican from Michigan's 2nd congressional district to the 56th United States Congress, after defeating the Republican incumbent in the primary. He was re-elected to the 57th Congress in 1900, serving from March 4, 1899 to March 3, 1903. He was an unsuccessful candidate for re-nomination in 1902, losing in the Republican primary election to Charles E. Townsend.

Smith resumed the practice of law in Adrian, where he resided until his death. He was interred in Oakwood Cemetery.

U.S. House of Representatives
Preceded by George Spalding	United States Representative for the 2nd congressional district of Michigan; 1899–1903	Succeeded by Charles E. Townsend
