= James S. Gorman =

American politician

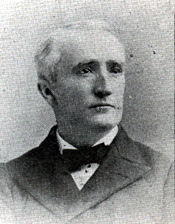
- From 1893's The House of Representatives of the Fifty Third Congress

Member of the U.S. House of Representatives from Michigan's 2nd district
- In office March 4, 1891 – March 3, 1895
- Preceded by: Edward P. Allen
- Succeeded by: George Spalding

Personal details
- Born: December 28, 1850 Lyndon Township, Michigan, U.S.
- Died: May 27, 1923 (aged 72) Detroit, Michigan, U.S.
- Party: Democratic
- Education: University of Michigan

James Sedgwick Gorman (December 28, 1850 – May 27, 1923) was a politician from the U.S. state of Michigan.

Gorman was born in Lyndon Township, Michigan, near Chelsea. He attended the common schools and the Union School of Chelsea, and graduated from the law department of the University of Michigan at Ann Arbor in 1876. He was admitted to the bar and commenced practice in Jackson. He served as assistant prosecuting attorney of Jackson County for two years and moved to Dexter in 1879.

Gorman was a member of the Michigan State House of Representatives from 1881 to 1882 and served in the Michigan Senate from 1887 to 1890. In 1890, he defeated incumbent Republican Edward P. Allen to be elected as a Democrat from Michigan's 2nd congressional district to the 52nd Congress He was re-elected to the 53rd, serving from March 4, 1891, to March 3, 1895. He was not a candidate for re-nomination in 1894.

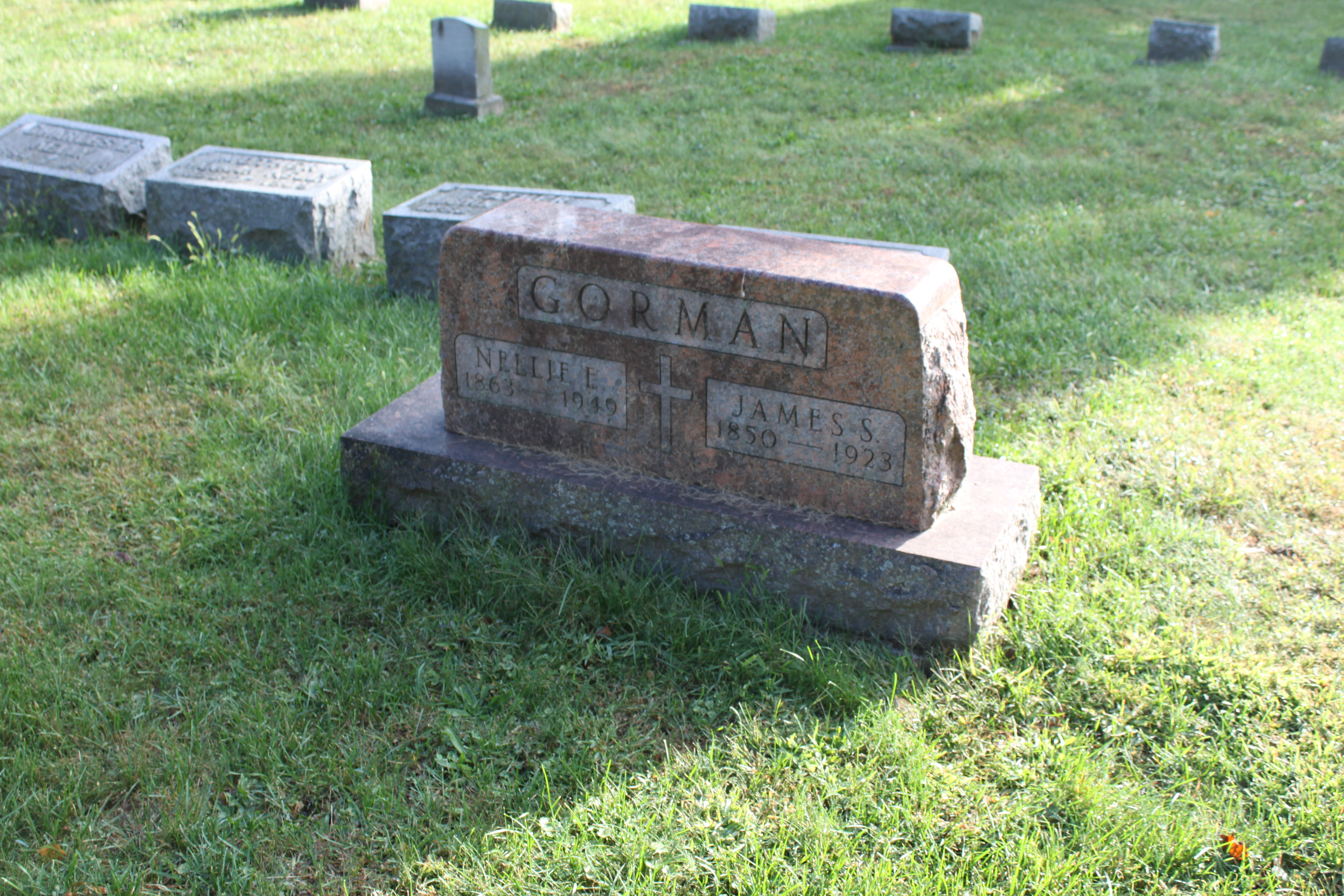
Gorman grave

James S. Gorman engaged in farming near Chelsea, and resumed the practice of law. He died in Detroit and was interred in Mount Olivet Cemetery, Chelsea, Michigan.

U.S. House of Representatives
Preceded by Edward P. Allen	United States Representative for the 2nd congressional district of Michigan; 1891–1895	Succeeded by George Spalding
