= 29th Michigan Infantry Regiment =

- Michigan state flag
- Active: October 3, 1864, to September 12, 1866
- Country: United States
- Allegiance: Union
- Branch: Infantry
- Engagements: Third Battle of Murfreesboro

The 29th Michigan Infantry Regiment was an infantry regiment that served in the Union Army during the American Civil War.

== Service ==
The 29th Michigan Infantry was mustered into Federal service at East Saginaw, Michigan, on October 3, 1864. Among the volunteers was future Michigan state politician Edward P. Allen.

The regiment was mustered out of service on September 12, 1865.

== Total strength and casualties ==
The regiment suffered one officer and five killed in action or mortally wounded and one officer and 65 enlisted men who died of disease, for a total of 72 fatalities.

== Commanders ==
- Colonel

== See also ==
- List of Michigan Civil War Units
- Michigan in the American Civil War
