= Edwin D. Nash =

American politician from Washington

Member of the Washington House of Representatives
- In office 1889–1891

Personal details
- Born: c. 1836 Chautauqua County, New York, United States
- Died: April 27, 1907 (aged 70–71) Oroville, Washington, United States
- Party: Democratic
- Occupation: businessman, politician

Military service
- Allegiance: United States
- Branch/service: 12th Missouri Cavalry
- Rank: Major (USV)
- Battles/wars: American Civil War: Franklin–Nashville Campaign; Battle of Nashville; Native American Wars: Powder River Expedition; Powder River Battles

Edwin D. Nash (c. 1836 – April 27, 1907) was a Union army officer during the American Civil War, and an American politician in the state of Washington. He served in the Washington House of Representatives from 1889 to 1891.

== Biography ==
Nash was born in Chautauqua County, New York in about 1836, and at the age of 22 in 1858, he moved to Missouri. During the American Civil War, Nash was commissioned a Major in the 12th Missouri Volunteer Cavalry Regiment in 1864, and he participated in the Franklin–Nashville Campaign and fought with the regiment in Tennessee and Alabama, most notably at the Battle of Nashville in December of that year. In the summer and fall of 1865, the 12th Missouri Cavalry Regiment, including Major Nash, accompanied the Powder River Expedition through the present-day states of Nebraska, South Dakota, Montana, and Wyoming, fighting against Sioux and Cheyenne Indians in the Powder River Battles. After the conclusion of the expedition, Nash was mustered out of the army on November 4, 1865. After the war, he returned to Missouri, but moved to Washington in 1883, and engaged in milling and merchandising. Nash staked a homestead near Molson, Washington, and carried the mail between Chewsaw and Oroville. In 1889, he was elected to the Washington House of Representatives from Douglas County, and served until 1891. Edwin D. Nash died of pneumonia on April 27, 1907.

== See also ==
- 12th Missouri Volunteer Cavalry
- Battle of Nashville
- Powder River Battles (1865)
