= 12th Missouri Cavalry Regiment =

- Provisional Government of Missouri (Pro-Union)
- Active: November 3, 1863, to June 20, 1866
- Country: United States
- Allegiance: Union
- Branch: Cavalry
- Engagements: American Civil War: Franklin–Nashville Campaign; Battle of Columbia; Battle of Spring Hill; Battle of Franklin; Battle of Nashville; Battle of Anthony's Hill; American Indian Wars: Powder River Expedition; Powder River Battles

The 12th Missouri Cavalry Regiment was a cavalry regiment that served in the Union Army during the American Civil War and American Indian Wars.

== Service ==
The 12th Missouri Cavalry Regiment was organized in St. Louis, Missouri from November 3, 1863, to March 23, 1864. Attached to the District of Saint Louis, Missouri, Department of Missouri, to July, 1864. 1st Brigade, 1st Cavalry Division, District of West Tennessee, Department Tennessee, to November, 1864. 1st Brigade, 5th Division, Cavalry Corps, Military Division Mississippi, to May, 1865. Department of Missouri, Eastern Division, Powder River Indian Expedition, and District of the Plains to April, 1866.

== Detailed service ==
Duty at St. Louis, Missouri until June 1, 1864. Ordered to Memphis, Tennessee, and duty there until August 1. Smith's Expedition to Oxford, Mississippi, August 1–30. Holly Springs August 1, and Elkshute August 4. Tallahatchie River August 7–9. Hurricane Creek and Oxford August 9. Abbeville August 13. Hurricane Creek August 13–14 and 19. College Hill, Oxford, August 23. At White's Station until September 30. March to Clifton and Lawrenceburg in pursuit of Nathan Bedford Forest September 30-October 8. At Clifton until October 27. Franklin–Nashville Campaign November–December. March to Pulaski, Tennessee, October 27-November 6. Expedition to Moscow November 9–13. Shoal Creek November 11. Eastport, Mississippi, November 10–11. On line of Shoal Creek November 16–20. Lawrenceburg November 22. Campbellville and Lynnville November 24. In front of Columbia and Battle of Columbia November 24–27. Crossing of Duck River November 28. Present at Battle of Spring Hill November 29. In reserve during Battle of Franklin November 30. Battle of Nashville December 15–16. Pursuit of Hood December 17–28. Richland Creek December 24. Battle of Anthony's Hill or King's Gap, near Pulaski, Tennessee, December 25. At Gravelly Springs, Alabama, and Eastport, Mississippi Scouting in Northern Mississippi and Alabama until May, 1865. Moved to St. Louis, Missouri May 12–17, thence to Fort Leavenworth, Kansas, and to Omaha, Nebraska. Powder River Indian Expedition against Sioux, Cheyenne, and Arapaho Indians, in Nebraska, Dakota Territory, and Montana Territory, July 1-September 20, 1865. Actions with Indians on the Powder River September 1–11. March from Fort Connor to Fort Laramie September 25-October 4. Engaged in frontier duty until April, 1866, and mustered out on April 9, 1866.

== Casualties ==
The regiment lost a total of 263 men during its entire service; one officer and 35 enlisted men killed or mortally wounded, and one officer and 226 enlisted men died of disease.

== Field Officers ==
- Oliver Wells, Colonel
- Richard H. Brown, Lieutenant Colonel
- Edwin D. Nash, Major (member of the Washington House of Representatives from 1889 to 1891)
- James M. Hubbard, Major
- Levi Pritchard, Major

== See also ==
- Missouri Civil War Union units
- Missouri in the Civil War
