= Battle of Sulphur Creek Trestle =

Battle of the American Civil War

Battle of Sulpher Creek Trestle
- Part of the American Civil War
| Date | September 23, 1864 – September 25, 1864 |
| Location | Limestone County, Alabama; Morgan County, Alabama; Giles County, Tennessee 34°54′34″N 86°59′17″W |
| Result | Confederate victory |

Belligerents
| United States (Union) | (Confederate States of America) CSA (Confederacy) |

Commanders and leaders
| Wallace Campbell; Jonas Elliott; W. H. Lathrop; George Spalding | Nathan Bedford Forrest |

Units involved
| 110th USCT; 102nd Ohio Infantry; 18th Michigan Infantry; 111th USCT; 4th Cavalry Division | Cavalry Corps, Department of Alabama, Mississippi, and East Louisiana |

Strength
| 2,350 | 4,500 |

Casualties and losses
| 2,350 | 139 |

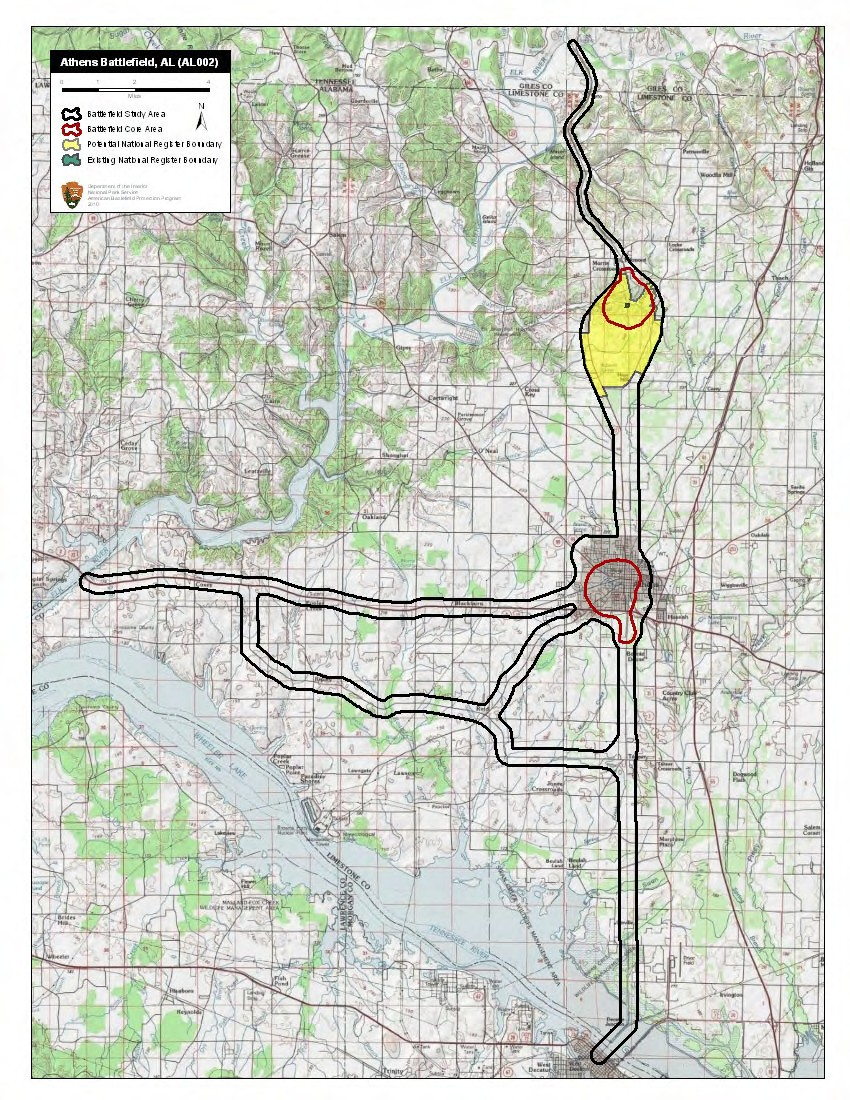
Map of Athens Battlefield core and study areas by the American Battlefield Protection Program.

The Battle of Sulphur Creek Trestle, also known as the Battle of Athens, was fought near Athens, Alabama (Limestone County, Alabama), from September 23 to 25, 1864 as part of the American Civil War.

In September 1864, General Nathan Bedford Forrest led his force into northern Alabama and middle Tennessee to disrupt the supply of William Tecumseh Sherman's army in Georgia.

The battle's site was listed on the National Register of Historic Places in 1973.

== Athens (September 23–24) ==
On the afternoon of 23 September, Union forces engaged Confederate forces five miles south of Athens, near Tanner, where they were destroying a railroad trestle. Forrest's Confederate forces moved towards Athens. That evening the Confederate forces gained control of the town, and the Union forces had retreated within Fort Henderson.

The Confederate forces began an artillery barrage on the morning of the 24th. In a personal meeting, Forrest convinced the Union commander, Colonel Wallace Campbell, that the Confederate forces numbered 8,000-10,000. Campbell surrendered the fort and its garrison around noon.

Shortly after the garrison had surrendered, reinforcements consisting of about 350 men from the 18th Michigan and 102nd Ohio, commanded by Jonas Elliott, arrived by train from Decatur. After suffering casualties of one-third their total personnel, these forces surrendered.

== Sulphur Creek Trestle (September 25) ==
After defeating the Union forces in Athens, Forrest moved north along the railroad with the intent to destroy a strategic trestle at Sulphur Creek, six miles north of Athens. A fortification, two blockhouses, and a force of 1,000 Union soldiers defended the trestle.

On the morning of the 25th, the Confederate forces began an artillery bombardment of the fort. The fortification had been built below the summits of adjacent hills, and thus provided little defense against the bombardment. 200 Union soldiers were killed, including the commander, Colonel William Hopkins Lathrop. By noon, George Spalding had surrendered the remaining 800 soldiers. There were no reported Confederate losses.

== Aftermath ==
The Union prisoners were transferred to Confederate prisons. Many of these prisoners died on April 27, 1865, when the steamboat Sultana sank while transporting them home.
