= Union School (St. Johns, Michigan) =

- Formerly listed on the U.S. National Register of Historic Places
- Michigan State Historic Site
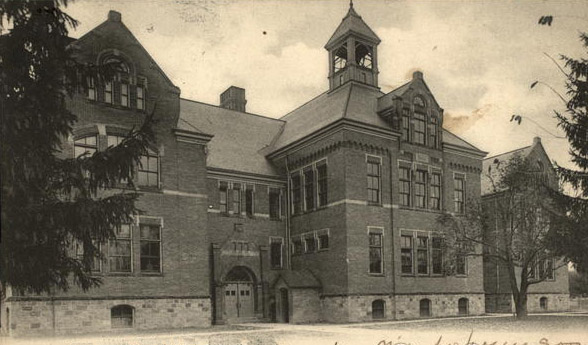

- Location within Michigan Location within the United States
- Interactive map
- Location: 205 W. Baldwin St., St. Johns, Michigan
- Coordinates: 42°59′52″N 84°33′39″W
- Area: 2.5 acres (1.0 ha)
- Built: 1885
- Architect: Watkins & Arnold
- Architectural style: Tudor Revival, Queen Anne
- Demolished: 2000
- NRHP reference No.: 80001851

Significant dates
- Added to NRHP: May 15, 1980
- Removed from NRHP: April 27, 2026

The Union School, also known a Central Elementary School, was an educational building located in St. Johns, Michigan. It was designated a Michigan State Historic Site and listed on the National Register of Historic Places in 1980. The school building has been replaced by a housing development and the building was removed from the National Register in 2026..

== History ==
The St Johns school district was founded in 1857; the district re-organized in 1862 and built their second permanent building on this site in 1864. The school burned in early 1885, and construction began on the Union School, the third building constructed for the St. Johns school district, later in the year. It was designed by architecture firm Watkins & Arnold. The building was used as a school by the district until 1986.

The district sold the building to private owners, and houses were constructed on the former site of the school in 2000.

== Description ==
The St. Johns Union School was a 2-1/2 story red brick building set on a raised stone foundation and topped with a slate roof. The school covered an area 147 feet (45 m) long 74 feet (23 m) wide. It had a central mass with a hip roof and two T-shaped wings, also with hip roofs. Broad gable roof dormers broke up the roofline on the front facade, and a square belfry tops the center mass. The exterior decoration included Tudor Revival elements on the entrance surrounds, and first- and second-floor window hoods.

On the interior, classrooms were located in the main masses, with the narrow connecting "T" legs containing stairways, a library, and administration offices. When it was constructed, the building had state-of-the-art lighting, heating, ventilation, and fireproofing.
