= George Spalding =

American politician

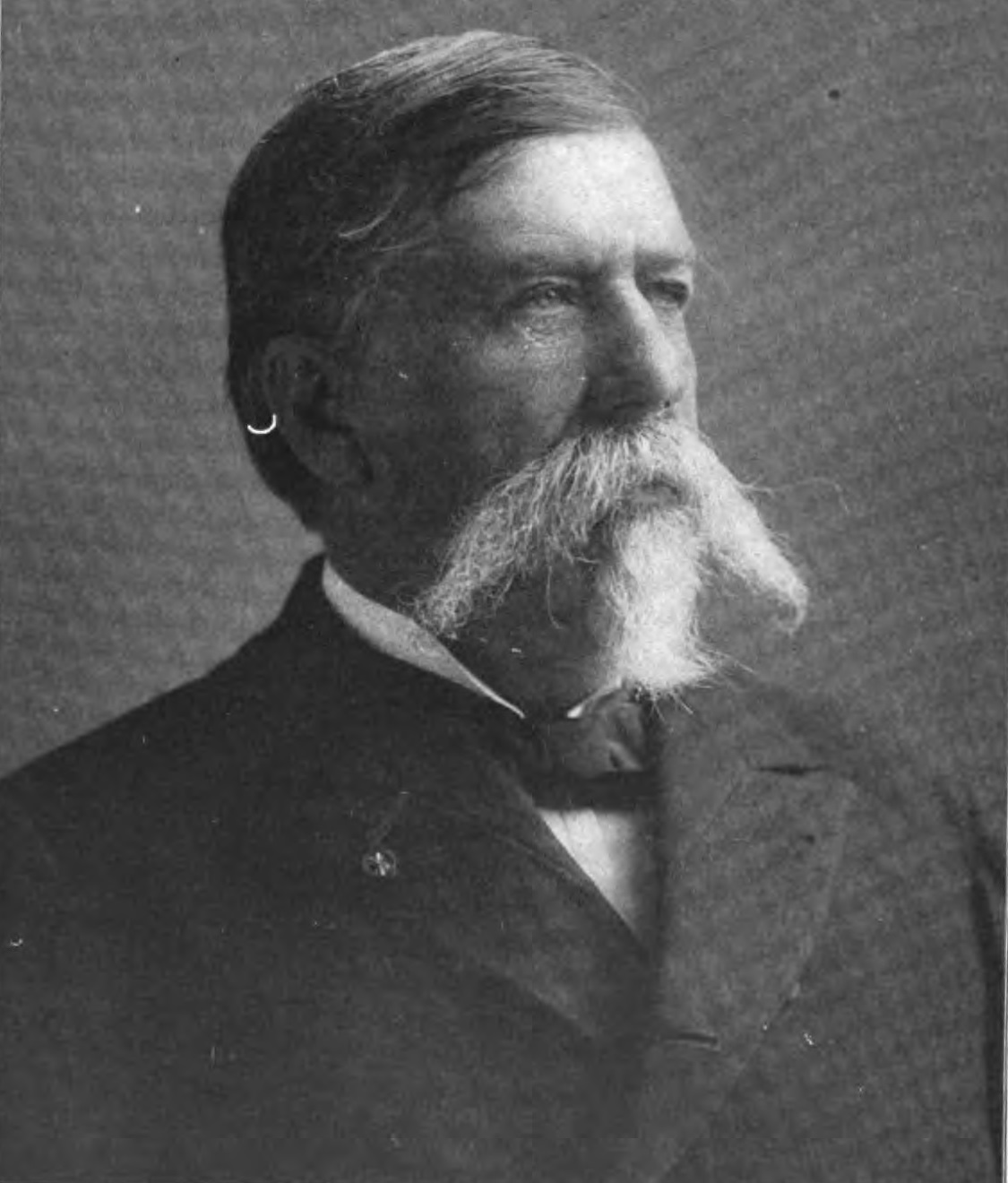
- From Volume II of 1899's Autobiographies and Portraits of the President, Cabinet, Supreme Court and Fifty-Fifth Congress

Member of the U.S. House of Representatives from Michigan's 2nd district
- In office March 4, 1895 – March 3, 1899
- Preceded by: James S. Gorman
- Succeeded by: Henry C. Smith

Mayor of Monroe, Michigan
- In office 1876–1877
- Preceded by: Heman J. Redfield
- Succeeded by: Alfred I. Sawyer

Personal details
- Born: November 12, 1836 Blairgowrie, Perthshire, Scotland
- Died: September 13, 1915 (aged 78) Monroe, Michigan, U.S.
- Resting place: Woodland Cemetery, Monroe, Michigan
- Party: Republican
- Spouse: Augusta Lewis (m. 1871–1915, his death)
- Children: 4
- Profession: Attorney

Military service
- Allegiance: United States (Union)
- Branch/service: Union Army
- Years of service: 1861–1865
- Rank: Colonel (Army); Brigadier General (Brevet)
- Unit: 4th Michigan Volunteer Infantry Regiment
- Commands: 12th U.S. Tennessee Cavalry
- Battles/wars: American Civil War

George Spalding (November 12, 1836 – September 13, 1915) was a politician from the U.S. state of Michigan.

== Biography ==
Spalding was born in Blairgowrie, Perthshire, Scotland and immigrated to the United States in 1843 with his parents. The settled in Buffalo, New York, where he attended the public schools. He later moved to Monroe, Michigan, and taught school in 1860 and 1861. He entered the United States Army on June 20, 1861, as a private in Company A, 4th Michigan Volunteer Infantry Regiment, and was promoted through the ranks to colonel of the 12th U.S. Tennessee Cavalry. In 1865, Spalding was promoted to brigadier general by brevet to commemorate his wartime service.

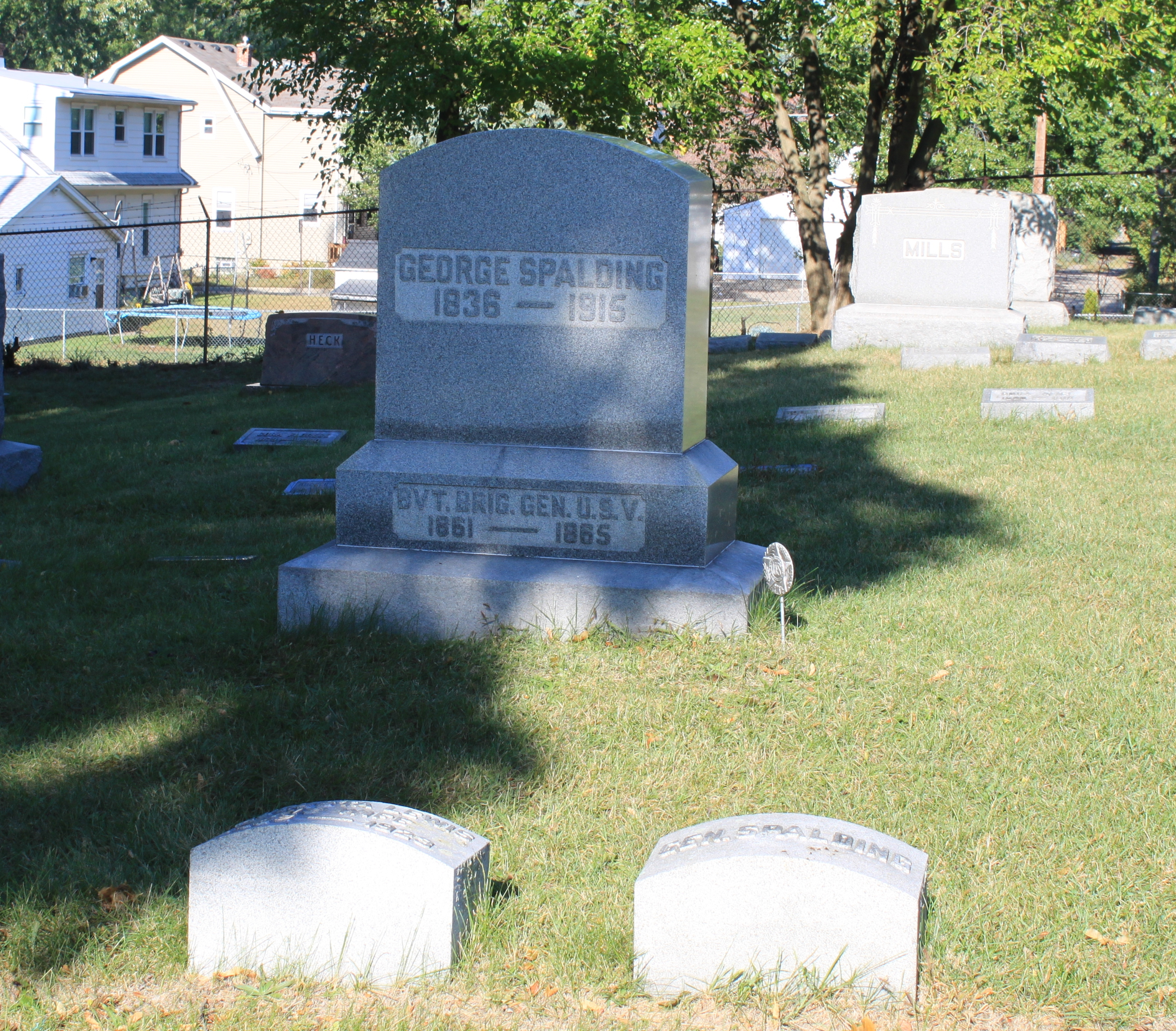
Spalding grave

Spalding was appointed postmaster of Monroe, July 27, 1866, and served until December 15, 1870. He was special agent of the U.S. Treasury Department, serving from 1871 to 1875. He was elected mayor of Monroe in 1876 and served as president of the board of education. He studied law and was admitted to the bar in 1878. He later became a member of the board of control of the State Industrial Home for Girls from 1885 to 1897.

In 1894, he was elected as a Republican from Michigan's 2nd congressional district to the 54th United States Congress, and re-elected to the 55th Congress, serving from March 4, 1895 to March 3, 1899. He was an unsuccessful candidate for re-nomination in 1898, losing to Henry C. Smith in the Republican primary elections.

Spalding was again appointed postmaster of Monroe on February 20, 1899, and served until February 13, 1907. He resumed the practice of law and also engaged in agricultural pursuits. He was president of the First National Bank of Monroe until his death there. He was interred in Woodland Cemetery.

U.S. House of Representatives
Preceded by James S. Gorman	United States Representative for the 2nd congressional district of Michigan; 1895–1899	Succeeded by Henry C. Smith
