= William V. Wheeler =

William Vincent Wheeler
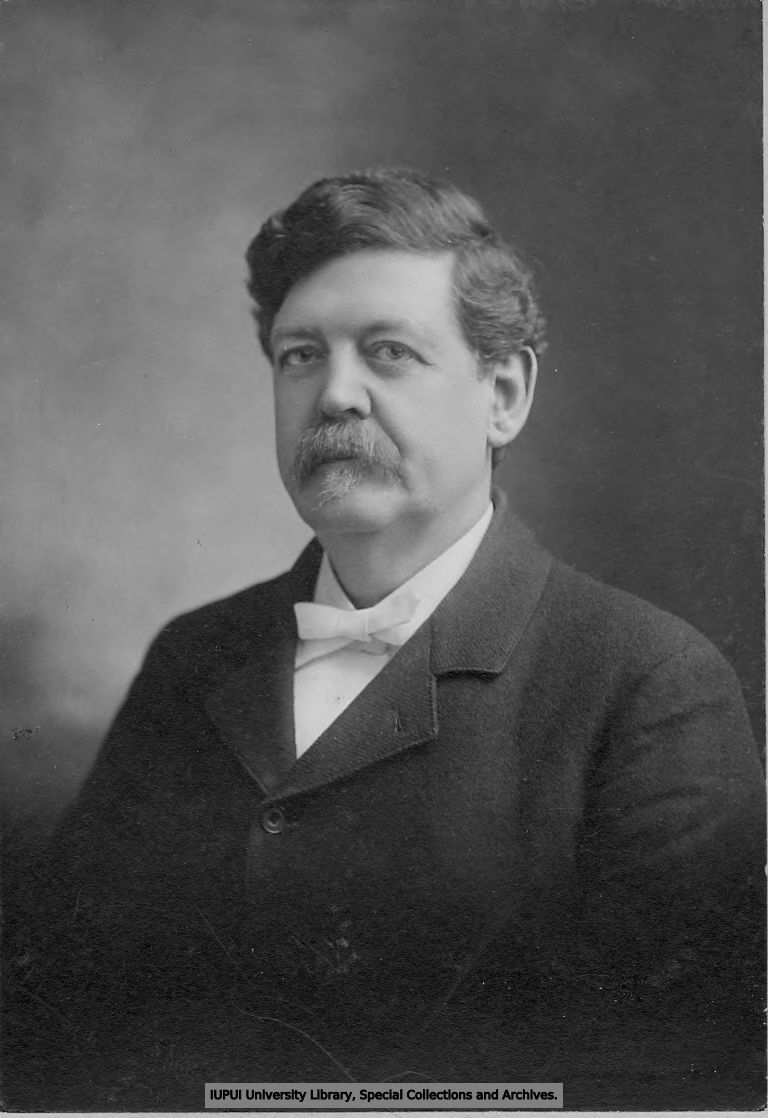
- Photo of William V. Wheeler, Date Unknown
- Born: 1845
- Died: 1908 (aged 62–63)
- Resting place: Crown Hill Cemetery and Arboretum, Section 27, Lot 179; 39.8172488°N 86.1720549°W
- Known for: Founder of Wheeler Mission Ministries

William Vincent Wheeler (1845–1908) was the founder of Wheeler Mission Ministries of Indianapolis, Indiana.

== Early life and the Wheeler family ==
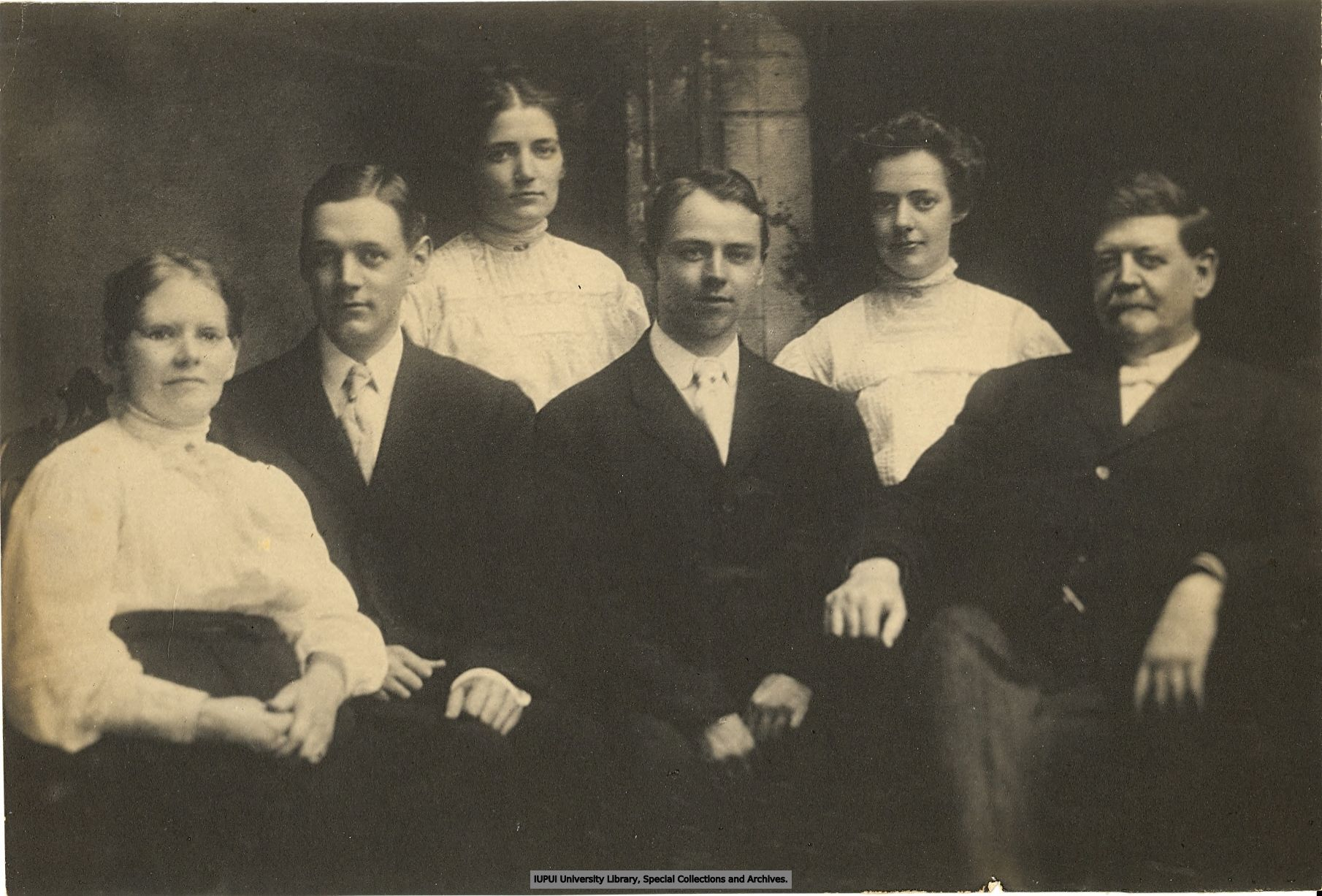
William V. Wheeler (far right) pictured with wife Mary (far left) and children in 1906.

William V. Wheeler was born in 1845 to Walter Raleigh and Elizabeth Stubbs Wheeler in West Elkton, Ohio. Walter and Elizabeth also had one daughter, Rebecca Esther (1850–1931). An accident caused Elizabeth Wheeler’s death in 1851 and Walter remarried Mary P. Stanley in 1853. William Wheeler gained two new siblings from this marriage, Charles Pinkney (1866–1894) and Albert Sheridan (1868–1883).

William Wheeler and his new family moved from West Elkton, Ohio, to Richmond, Indiana, in 1853, and later ended up in Dublin, Indiana. Wheeler kept in touch and remained close with family from his mother’s side; his aunt, Elvira Stubbs Pray, her four children, and her husband, who was a renowned Quaker preacher, gave Wheeler a Bible that he would later carry with him into the American Civil War.

Shortly after the beginning of the war, Wheeler moved to Liberty, Indiana. In 1863, William Wheeler enlisted in the Ninth Indiana Cavalry at the age of 18 years. He took part in the campaign against the Confederate general, Hood, as well as the battles of Spring Hill, Franklin, and Nashville. Wheeler saw a large amount of action throughout his time in the Civil War and contracted a near fatal fever during his time spent in the swamps of Mississippi. This fever left Wheeler with chronic rheumatism for the rest of his life.

In 1865, Wheeler left the army with an honorable discharge and moved to Indianapolis in 1866. There he became a wagon delivery driver for the Layman-Carey Hardware Company, and later the head of sales.

Wheeler experienced a religious conversion in 1868. A letter to his cousin, Rachel Pray, explains his conversion from his "unworthy life", confessing a drinking problem and feelings of despair, sinfulness, and misery.

After his conversion, Wheeler became a charter member of the Trinity Methodist Episcopal Church where he grew to be a licensed evangelical lay preacher for the church in 1868, filling in for the church while it was between pastors. Wheeler often gave his sermons under a large beech tree near the entrance of the Greenlawn Cemetery.

William Wheeler married Mary Jane Howard in 1872. Howard was also involved in evangelical work. William and Mary had four children: Walter Howard, Sybil May, Hetta Ada, and William Raleigh. Their son, Walter, founded Memorial Park in Indianapolis and managed the Crown Hill Cemetery. Their daughter, May, did medical research and aided in isolating the typhus bacterium, and their other daughter Ada studied piano in Germany.

== The Rescue Mission ==
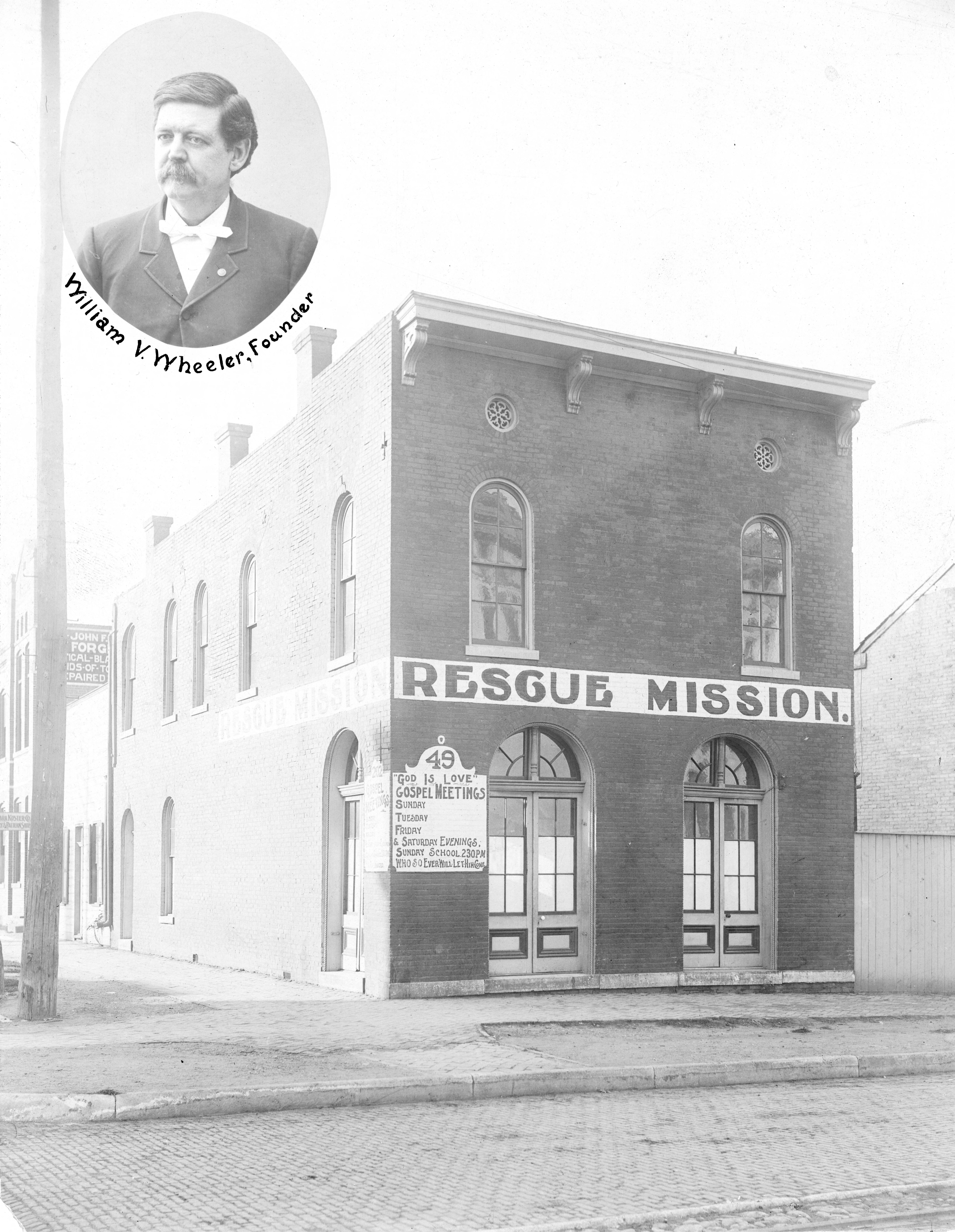
Wheeler Rescue Mission, undated.

In 1893, Wheeler helped the Meridian Union of the Women’s Christian Temperance Union (WCTU) open a ministry for unwed mothers in Indianapolis, calling it The Door of Hope. Most of the women in this union were from Wheeler’s home church. William’s wife, Mary, became the treasurer for the new home.

Not long after the opening of the home, Wheeler proposed that the services available in the home be extended to men and children, forming a wider ministry. The WCTU approved, and Wheeler became part-time superintendent, starting a rescue mission. The mission was one of the first charitable operations of its kind in Indianapolis.

In 1895, Wheeler resigned from his job with the hardware company to become the full-time superintendent of the rescue mission.

With Wheeler as superintendent, the mission’s programs expanded to include a Sunday school, a sewing school, a mothers’ club, home visits to the families of those belonging to the home, Marion County Workhouse visits, and Sunday afternoon visits to City Hospital (now Eskanazi Hospital). The need for an adequate building grew as the mission’s services grew. A building campaign began in 1901 and by 1905, the Rescue Mission had raised nearly $17,000 to begin construction on a new building at 443 East South Street, The building included a 400-seat chapel and provided the much needed space to shelter the men, women, and children who came to the mission in their times of need.

Wheeler tried to serve the poor by serving entire families, going each day to court proceedings, seeking out men who were looking for a way to improve their lot. Wheeler said that if he could help these men straighten out their lives, their families were sure to receive the benefits. Wheeler stated that the motto of the mission was “To be all the help we can, in all the ways we can, to all the people we can.”

== Legacy ==
Shortly after the death of his wife, Mary Wheeler, in 1907, William Wheeler experienced some reoccurring heart trouble. Even though bedridden, Wheeler managed the mission, with the help of his assistants, until the time of his death in 1908 on Christmas Day. On the Sunday morning of December 27, the poor gathered at the mission to say their goodbye's to “Brother Wheeler.” A second funeral was held later that afternoon at the Central Avenue Methodist Episcopal Church and a third, private, family funeral was held on the morning of December 28.

A week after Wheeler’s death, the mission’s name was changed. The mission William Vincent Wheeler began in 1893 continues today as Wheeler Mission Ministries.

== Wheeler Mission Ministries ==
Today, Wheeler Mission Ministries is a non-denominational, Christian organization that provides critically needed goods and services to the homeless, poor, and needy of central Indiana without regard to race, color, creed, national origin, or religion.

Breakfast, lunch, dinner, showers, clothing, chapel services, emergency and long term housing, Bible studies, case management, and many other services and programs are provided through Wheeler Mission. Medical, dental, podiatric, and vision services are offered as well.

Though operated in several locations, Wheeler Mission is most well known for working with homeless men at the Mission on Delaware Street in Indianapolis. There is also an addiction recovery program housed at the Lighthouse Center and Hebron Center. Women and children are helped at the Center for Women and Children.

Wheeler Mission is the oldest operating ministry of its kind in the state of Indiana. There are five locations, dozens of ministries, and over 100 employees, making Wheeler Mission the largest and most diverse ministry of its kind in the state.
