= Battle of Anthony's Hill =

Battle of the American Civil War

- Part of the American Civil War
Date	December 25, 1864
Location	Giles County, Tennessee 35.13605°N 87.10699°W
Result	Confederate victory

Belligerents
United States (Union)	(Confederate States of America) CSA (Confederacy)

Commanders and leaders
James H. Wilson	Nathan Bedford Forrest

Strength
1,000	4,000

Casualties and losses
3 killed, 18 wounded, 5 missing	Unknown

The Battle of Anthony's Hill (also known as the Battle of King's Hill or the Battle of Devil's Gap) was an engagement that occurred December 25, 1864, in Tennessee during the American Civil War between combined Confederate cavalry and infantry units commanded by Maj. Gen. Nathan Bedford Forrest and Union forces commanded by Maj. Gen. James H. Wilson. The battle was a part of the Franklin–Nashville Campaign.

General Forrest had been assigned by Lt. General John B. Hood to the command of the rear guard of the Army of Tennessee, which was in flight following the military disaster experienced at the Battle of Nashville on December 15–16, 1864. After evacuating Pulaski, Tennessee, on the evening of December 24, Forrest was confronted with the problem of slowing Wilson's aggressive pursuit enough so that the Confederate army could complete the final 40 mi (64 km) of its retreat to the Tennessee River.

== Battle ==
Believing he was pursuing an enemy ripe for capture, Wilson had his troops on the road early on Christmas Day. By 3:00 p.m. he was several miles south of Pulaski when he encountered Forrest's skirmishers. Without hesitation, he sent in pursuit three regiments of dismounted cavalry into a heavily wooded gorge leading to the top of Anthony's Hill. Good progress was made until a rail barricade was encountered. Here Forrest had posted his two brigades of infantry and two brigades of cavalry along with three masked field pieces. In moments the Federal troops had been blasted back by heavy musketry in the direction from which they came, with Forrest's men in rapid pursuit. Soon they encountered an additional brigade of Wilson's troops who quickly joined the retreat. After capturing a Federal cannon, the Confederates continued in pursuit an additional half-mile until they struck a full division of Union cavalry. At this point Forrest had chosen to disengage. His victorious troops returned up the hill to their original positions at the barricades, and then finally withdrew under the cover of darkness further south to Sugar Creek.

== Aftermath ==
Forrest, who had already established a reputation for bold offensive action, displayed at Anthony's Hill an equal mastery of defensive warfare. His stands there and the following day at Sugar Creek bought important time for the stricken army to flee for safety behind the Tennessee River. That the Army of Tennessee survived to cross the river safely on December 26–28 barely hours ahead of their pursuers, and continued to fight into the following spring is due almost completely to Forrest's performance in delaying the Union pursuit.
