= 1st Indiana Heavy Artillery Regiment =

1st Indiana Heavy Artillery Regiment 21st Indiana Volunteer Infantry Regiment
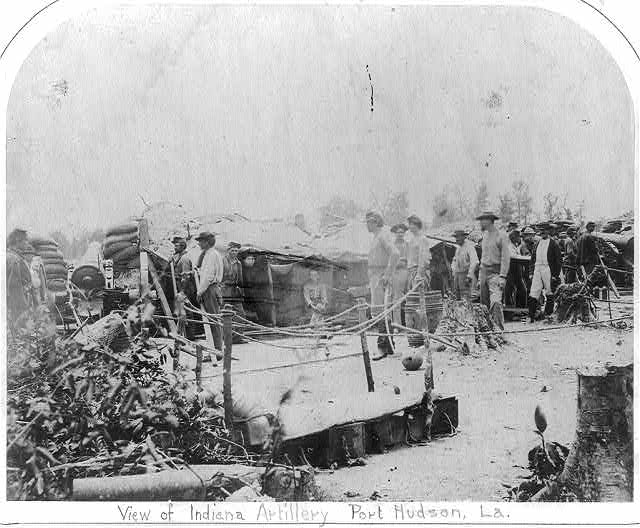
- Indiana artillery, presumably part of the 1st Regiment, at the Siege of Port Hudson in 1863
- Active: July 24, 1861, to January 10, 1866
- Country: United States
- Allegiance: Union
- Branch: Infantry & Heavy artillery
- Engagements: American Civil War: Battle of Baton Rouge; Bayou Teche Campaign; Siege of Port Hudson; Red River Campaign (Companies G & I); Battle of Mobile Bay; Battle of Spanish Fort; Battle of Fort Blakeley

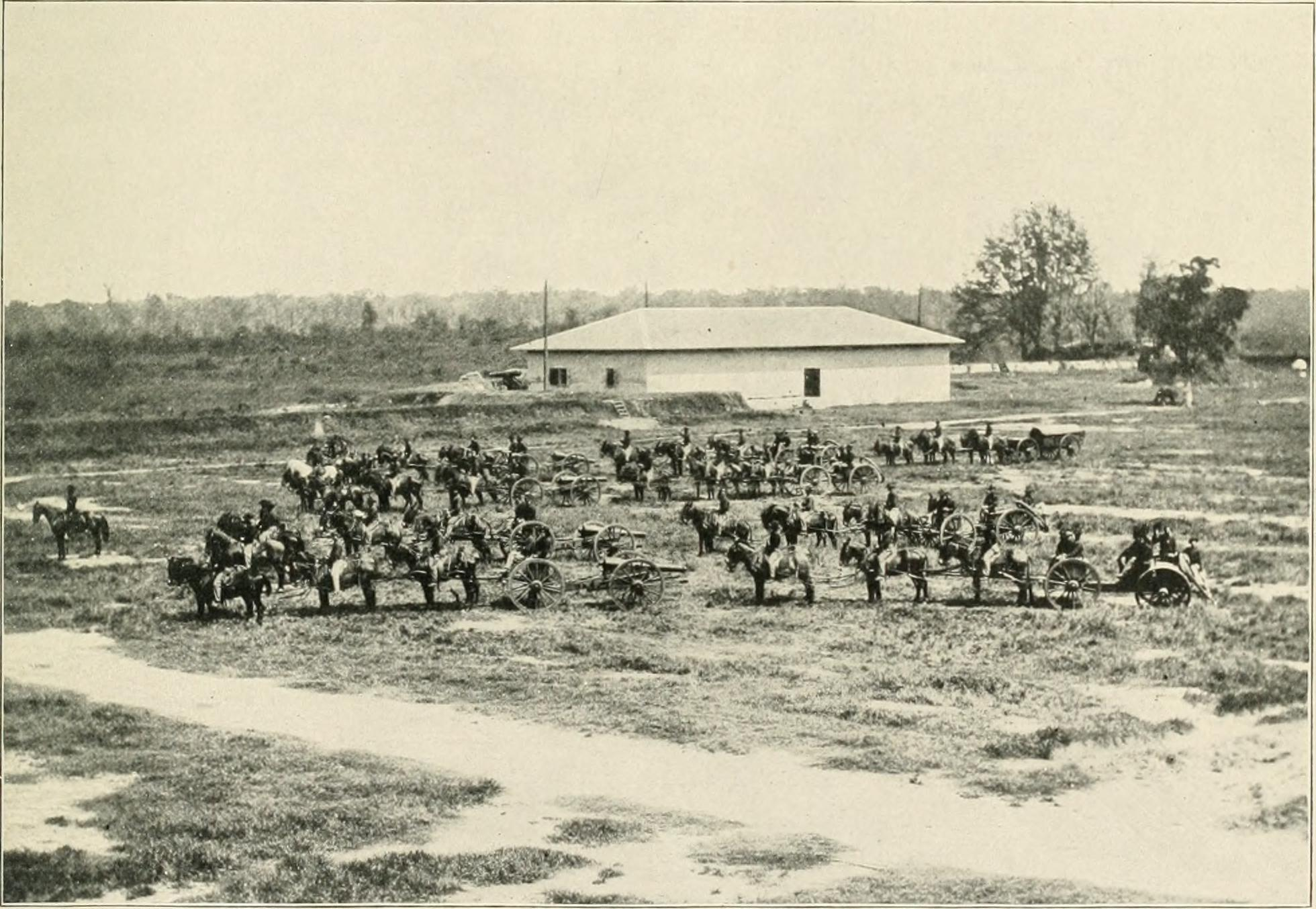
1st Indiana on the move at Baton Rouge, Louisiana

1st Regiment Indiana Heavy Artillery was a heavy artillery regiment that served in the Union Army during the American Civil War. It was nicknamed the "Jackass Regiment". Before being converted into an artillery unit in 1863, it served as the 21st Regiment, Indiana Volunteer Infantry.

== Service ==
The 1st Indiana Heavy Artillery was organized in Indianapolis, Indiana, July 24, 1861, as the 21st Indiana Infantry under the command of Colonel James Winning McMillan. The regiment was converted to heavy artillery in February 1863.

The regiment was attached to Dix's Division, Baltimore, Maryland, to February 1862. Butler's New Orleans Expedition to March 1862. 2nd Brigade, Department of the Gulf, to October 1862. Independent Command, Department of the Gulf, to January 1863. Unattached, 1st Division, XIX Corps, Department of the Gulf, to February 1863. Artillery, 1st Division, XIX Corps, to August 1863. District of Baton Rouge, Louisiana, Department of the Gulf, to June 1864. Unattached, XIX Corps, and unattached, Department of the Gulf, to January 1866.

The 1st Indiana Heavy Artillery mustered out January 10, 1866, at Baton Rouge, Louisiana.

== Detailed service ==
Left Indiana for Baltimore, Maryland, July 31, and duty in the defenses of that city until February 19, 1862. Expedition to Eastern Shore of Maryland November 14–22, 1861. Moved to Newport News, Virginia, February 19, 1862; then sailed on the steamer Constitution for Ship Island, Mississippi, March 4–13. Duty at Ship Island until April 14. Operations against Forts St. Philip and Jackson April 14–28. Occupation of New Orleans May 1 (first regiment to land). Camp at Algiers until May 30. Expedition to New Orleans and Jackson Railroad May 9–10. Moved to Baton Rouge May 30, and duty there until August 20. Battle of Baton Rouge August 5. Evacuation of Baton Rouge August 20. Camp at Carrollton until October. Action at Bayou Des Allemands September 4–5. Expedition from Carrollton to St. Charles Court House September 7–8. Skirmish near St. Charles Court House September 8. Expedition from Carrollton to Donaldsonville and skirmish October 21–25. Duty at Berwick Bay until February 1863. Bayou Teche November 3, 1862. Action with steamer Cotton, Bayou Teche, January 14, 1863. Operations in western Louisiana April 9-May 19. Teche Campaign April 11–20. Fort Bisland April 12–14. Advance on Port Hudson May 20–24. Siege of Port Hudson May 24-July 9. Assaults on Port Hudson May 27 and June 14. Lafourche Crossing June 20–21 (Company F). Brashear City June 23 (Company F). Expedition to Sabine Pass, Texas, September 4–11 (detachment). Garrison duty at New Orleans, Baton Rouge, and at various points in the Department of the Gulf until February 1865.

Companies L and M were organized August 12 to November 2, 1863. Red River Campaign March to May 1864 (Companies G & I). Blair's Landing April 12–13 (detachment). Monett's Ferry, Cane River Crossing, April 23 (detachment). Retreat to Morganza May 13–20. Operations in Mobile Bay, Alabama, against Forts Gaines and Morgan August 2–23 (Companies B, F, H, and K). Siege and capture of Fort Gaines August 3–8. Siege and capture of Fort Morgan August 8–23. At New Orleans until March 1865. Campaign against Mobile, Alabama, and its defenses March 17-April 12, 1865. Siege of Spanish Fort and Fort Blakeley March 26-April 8. Fort Blakeley April 9. Occupation of Mobile April 12, and duty there until June 24. Garrison duty until January 1866. Companies B and C at Fort Morgan; Companies H and K at Fort Gaines; Companies F and L at Fort Barrancas, Florida; Companies I and M at Fort Pickens, Florida; Companies A, E, and G at Baton Rouge, Louisiana; Company D at Port Hudson, Louisiana.

== Casualties ==
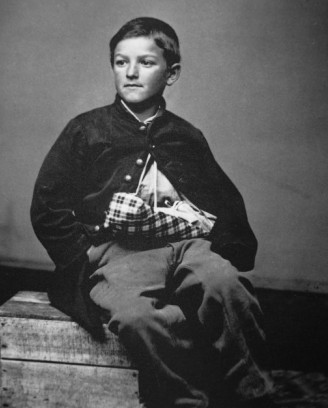
Drummer Edward Black served 24 July 1861-16 August 1862. Wounded while in the service.

The regiment lost a total of 390 men during service; 7 officers and 60 enlisted men killed or mortally wounded, 3 officers and 320 enlisted men died of disease.

== Commanders ==
- Colonel James Winning McMillan
- Colonel John A. Keith
- Major William Roy - commanded at the battle of Mobile Bay

== See also ==
- List of Indiana Civil War regiments
- Indiana in the Civil War
