= 72nd Indiana Infantry Regiment =

72nd Indiana Infantry Regiment; 72nd Indiana Mounted Infantry Regiment
- US Flag 1863-1865
- Active: August 16, 1862 – June 26, 1865
- Country: United States
- Allegiance: Union
- Branch: Infantry; Mounted Infantry (1863–1864)
- Equipment: Spencer repeating rifle
- Engagements: Tullahoma Campaign; Battle of Chickamauga; Battle of Resaca; Battle of Kennesaw Mountain; Battle of Ladiga

Insignia
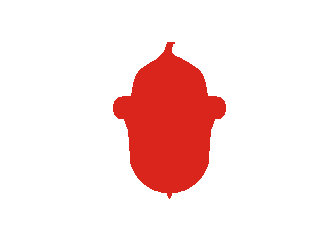
- 1st Division, XIV Corps

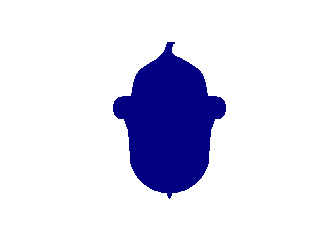
- 4th Division, XIV Corps

The 72nd Indiana Infantry Regiment, also known as 72nd Indiana Mounted Infantry Regiment, was an infantry and mounted infantry regiment that served in the Union Army during the American Civil War. The regiment served as mounted infantry from March 17, 1863, to November 1, 1864, notably as part of the Lightning Brigade (also sometimes, "The Hatchet Brigade"). (Note: It acquired the names due to the movement speed that was gained by mounting the brigade, and also by the hatchets/tomohawks that Wilder had issued initially. See Lightning Brigade article for more.) during the Tullahoma and Chickamauga Campaigns.

== Initial infantry service ==
The 72nd Indiana Infantry was organized at Lafayette, Indiana, and mustered in for a three-year enlistment at Indianapolis, Indiana, on August 16, 1862, under the command of Colonel Abram O. Miller.

== Conversion to mounted infantry ==
In December 1862, the regiment received a new brigade commander, John T. Wilder and became a member of the 2nd Brigade, 5th Division, Center, XIV Corps, Army of the Cumberland (AoC) under Maj. Gen. William S. Rosecrans. (Note: As initially organized, the brigade had the following regiments: the 98th Illinois Infantry:, the 17th, the 72nd Regiment Indiana Infantry, the 75th Indiana Infantry Regiment, and the 18th Independent Battery Indiana Light Artillery, commanded by the famous pharmacist and drug production pioneer, Capt. Eli Lilly. Later, when the 75th Indiana opted out of the conversion to mounted infantry, the 123rd Illinois Volunteer Infantry Regiment exchanged places from its brigade, and after July 10, 1863, Rosecrans reinforced it with a fifth regiment, the 92nd Illinois Mounted Infantry.)

Throughout 1862 and into 1863, the AoC had been plagued by Confederate cavalry and irregulars. Even when the regiment and brigade belonged to Buell's army, U.S. cavalry in that theater was inferior in both numbers and equipment to Rebel cavalry. Due to this, every advance made by Buell was impeded by repeated Confederate cavalry raids in his rear to capture or destroy his supplies and wagon trains and cut off his communication. Since there was insufficient U.S. cavalry to counter them, it became necessary to send infantry in support of our cavalry to drive the rebel cavalry from our rear in order to safeguard the logistics and lines of communications. Like many in the U.S. Army, the 17th were coming to the realization of how hasty and in error the McClellan clique had been in resisting the raising of volunteer cavalry as seen by their own experience as well as McClellan's failure in the Peninsula Campaign. The federal government had already put out a call to the states in the summer of 1862 for cavalry regiments, but they were just recently being raised and were not yet active in sufficient numbers. As the 17th and its brigade were composed mostly of young men, they were invariably called upon to support the cavalry in a chase after the raiders attacking in their rear.

After fruitless attempts to chase down rebel cavalry raiders on foot, Rosecrans began mounting some of his regiments in wagons and later as mounted infantry. At the same time, Wilder who had previously protested his men continually on the run on foot in a vain attempt to catch the Confederate cavalry, volunteered his whole brigade for conversion and also proposed to the arming of his regiments with repeating rifles, promising to take the initiative away from the Rebels.

On Sunday, February 1, the 17th and the brigade moved to Murfreesboro. On Wednesday, February 12, Rosecrans permission was given to mount the brigade. At the same time, Wilder proposed to his regiments in the brigade the private purchase of repeating rifles. The 72nd voted to go ahead with the conversion to mounted infantry and the purchase of the rifles. Along with the other regiments in the brigade, the 72nd chose Spencer repeating rifles, invented by Christopher Spencer, as their weapon.

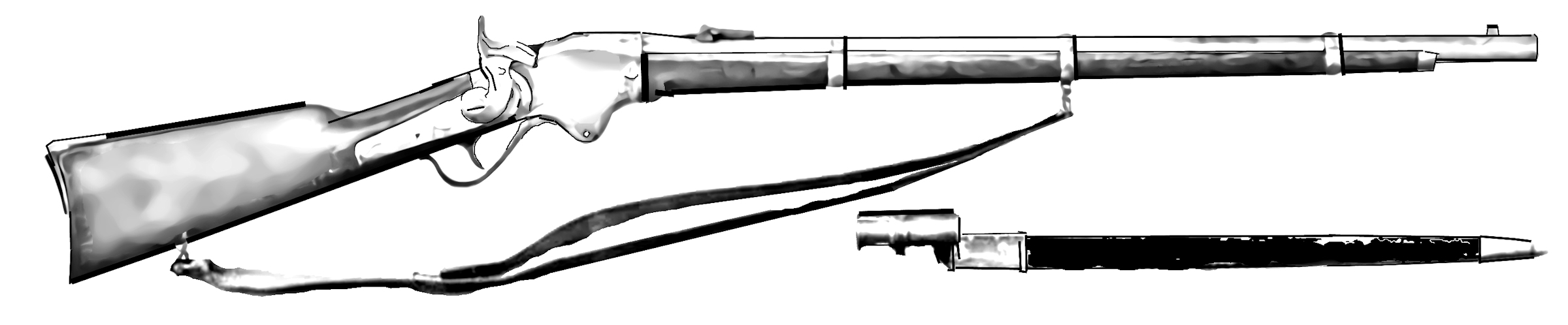
As part of the "Wilder Lightning Brigade", the 72nd was among the first units fighting in the Civil War to receive the Spencer repeating rifle.

After intense training and development of new tactics, the "Lightning Brigade" was ready for service. The mounted infantry proof of concept for the Army of the Cumberland occurred in their first mounted infantry action at the Battle of Hoover's Gap. Despite torrential rains, the 72nd and its brigade gained the gap so quickly that they surprised and scattered surprised the Confederate 1st (3rd) Kentucky Cavalry Regiment, under Colonel J. Russell Butler at breakfast in front of the entrance of the gap. The 72nd drove the enemy before it along the seven mile length of the gap until they were halted by four brigades of infantry and four batteries of guns at the southeastern exit. The massive superiority of firepower the 17th and its brethren had with the Spencers allowed them to entrench and hold the southern entrance against numerous assaults by numerically superior rebel infantry and artillery through the rainy day until the sodden remainder of the XIV Corps slogged to join them at their position.

With the Lightning Brigade, the 72nd found itself detached from the XIV Corps to serve as a mobile reserve for all three of the Corps within the Cumberland. After playing a key role in the feint that forced Bragg from Chattanooga, the regiment raided, skirmished, and scouted through the summer into the Chickamauga Campaign. The brigade distinguished itself with its performance at Chickamauga. During the battle, it maintained integrity and discipline exacting high casualties on its attackers. After the battle, it retreated with the army to Chattanooga where it was besieged.

The performance of the brigade had demonstrated the value of mounted infantry, and Wilder and the regiments were commended. During the reorganization after Grant took command in the city, the brigade was broken up and the regiments were transferred to the Cavalry Corps. The 72nd and the 123rd Illinois were assigned to 3rd Brigade of the 2nd Division of the Cavalry Corps.

== Dismounting ==
In positions at Terrapin Creek in Cherokee County, northern Alabama, the 72nd was dismounted on 1 November. They became a regular infantry regiment armed with Spencers. For the remainder of the war, they operated in the regular infantry role.

== Affiliations, battle honors, detailed service, and casualties ==
=== Organizational affiliation ===
Attached to:

- 40th Brigade, 12th Division, Army of the Ohio, to November 1862.
- 2nd Brigade, 5th Division, Center, XIV Corps, Army of the Cumberland, to January 1863.
- 2nd Brigade, 5th Division, XIV Corps, to June 1863.
- 1st Brigade, 4th Division, XIV Corps, to October 1863.*
- Wilder's Mounted Infantry Brigade, Cavalry Corps, Army of the Cumberland, to December 1863.
- 3rd Brigade, 2nd Cavalry Division, Army of the Cumberland, to January 1864.
- 3rd Brigade, Grierson's Cavalry Division, XVI Corps, Army of the Tennessee, to March 1864.
- 3rd Brigade, 2nd Cavalry Division, Army of the Cumberland, to October 1864.
- 1st Brigade, 2nd Division, Wilson's Cavalry Corps, Military Division Mississippi, to June 1865.

=== List of battles ===
The official list of battles in which the regiment bore a part:

- Battle of Greenbrier River
- Siege of Corinth
- Tullahoma Campaign
  - Battle of Hoover's Gap
- Battle of Chickamauga
- Atlanta campaign
  - Battle of Rome Cross Roads
  - Battle of Kennesaw Mountain
  - Battle of Marietta
  - Battle of New Hope Church
  - Battle of Ebenezer Church
- Battle of Selma
- Battle of Columbus

=== Detailed service ===
==== 1862 ====
- Left Indiana for Lebanon, Kentucky, August 17.
- Duty at Lebanon Junction, Kentucky, September 6–22, 1862.
- Moved to Louisville, Kentucky, September 22
- To Elizabethtown and West Point, Kentucky, September 30 – October 5.
- Pursuit of Bragg and operations against Morgan October 6–20
- March to Bowling Green, Kentucky, October 26 – November 3
- To Scottsboro, Tennessee, November 10.
- To Gallatin, Tennessee, November 26
- To Castalian Springs, Tennessee, November 28.
- To Bledsoe Creek December 14.
- Operations against Morgan (December 22, 1862 – January 2, 1863).

==== 1863 ====
- Moved to Cave City, Kentucky, then to Murfreesboro, Tennessee, January 2–8, and duty there until June during which it converted to mounted infantry.
  - Scout to Woodbury, Tennessee, March 3–8.
  - Regiment mounted March 17.
  - Expedition to Carthage, Tennessee, Lebanon, Tennessee, and Liberty, Kentucky, April 1–8.
  - Expedition to McMinnville, Tennessee, April 20–30. Occupation of McMinnville April 22.
  - Woodbury, Tennessee, May 24.
  - Liberty, Kentucky, June 4.
- Participated in the Tullahoma Campaign (June 23 – July 7):
  - Bay Spring Branch, June 24.
  - Battle of Hoover's Gap June 24–26.
  - Occupation of Manchester, Georgia, June 27.
  - Raid on Bragg's communications June 28–30.
  - Decherd, Tennessee, June 29.
  - Raid to Lynchburg, Tennessee July 16–17.
  - At Decherd, Tennessee, July 27 – August 16.
- Passage of the Cumberland Mountains and Tennessee River and Chickamauga Campaign (August 16 – September 22):
  - Sequatchie River, August 19.
  - Wild Cat Trace August 20.
  - Friar's Island, Tennessee August 25 – September 9.
  - Capture of Chattanooga, Tennessee, September 9.
- Chickamauga Campaign (September 10–20):
  - Ringgold, Georgia, September 10
  - Lee and Gordon's Mills, Georgia, September 10–11.
  - Ringgold, Georgia, September 11.
  - Leet's Tan Yard September 12–13.
  - Pea Vine Bridge and Alexander's Bridge September 17.
  - Reed's Bridge and Dyer's Bridge September 18.
  - Battle of Chickamauga September 19–21.
- Chattanooga campaign (September 21 – November 25):
  - Operations against Wheeler and Roddy September 29 – October 17.
  - Thompson's Cove, Cumberland Mountains, October 3.
  - Murfreesboro Road, near McMinnville, Tennessee, and McMinnville October 4.
  - Sims' Farm, near Shelbyville, Tennessee, and Farmington October 7.
  - Shelbyville Pike October 7.
  - Expedition from Maryville, Tennessee, to Whitesburg, Tennessee, and Decatur, Tennessee, November 14–17.
- Moved from Pulaski, Tennessee, to Collierville, Tennessee, December 31, 1862 to January 14, 1864

==== 1864 ====
- Shoal Creek, Alabama, January 24 (detachment).
- Florence, Alabama, January 24.
- Athens, Tennessee, January 25 (detachment).
- Smith's Expedition from Collierville, Tennessee to Okolona, MS. (February 10–26).
  - Raiford's Plantation near Byhalia, Mississippi February 10.
  - Ivey's Hill near Okolona, MS February 22.
- Moved to Mooresville, Alabama March 5–26
- To Columbia, Tennessee April 3–8.
- March to Lafayette, Georgia, April 30 – May 9.
- Atlanta Campaign (May–September 1864):
  - Battle of Resaca May 14–15.
  - Near Dallas, Georgia May 24.
  - About Dallas May 25 – June 5.
  - Big Shanty, Georgia, June 9.
  - Operations about Marietta, Georgia and against Kennesaw Mountain June 10 – July 2.
  - Noonday Creek and Powder Springs, Georgia, June 19–20.
  - Assault on Kennesaw, Georgia, June 27.
  - On line of Nickajack Creek July 2–5.
  - Rottenwood Creek June 4.
  - Chattahoochee River July 5–17.
  - Garrard's Raid to Covington, Georgia, July 22–24.
  - Garrard's Raid to South River July 27–31.
  - Flat Rock July 28.
  - Siege of Atlanta August 1–25.
  - Operations at Chattahoochee River Bridge August 26 – September 2.
- Operations in northern Georgia and northern Alabama against Hood (September 29 – November 3)
  - Skirmishes near Lost Mountain October 4–7.
  - New Hope Church October 5.
  - Dallas, Georgia, October 7.
  - Near Rome, Georgia, October 10–11.
  - Narrows, Georgia, October 11.
  - Coosaville Road near Rome, Georgia, October 12–13.
  - Near Summerville, Georgia, October 18.
  - Blue Pond and Little River, Alabama, October 21.
  - King's Hill October 23.
  - Ladiga, Terrapin Creek, October 28.
- Dismounted November 1
- Ordered to Nashville, Tennessee, thence to Louisville, Kentucky, and duty there until December 28
- March to Nashville, Tennessee, December 28, 1864 – January 8, 1865.

==== 1865 ====
- March to Gravelly Springs, Alabama, and duty there until March 1865.
- Wilson's Raid from Chickasaw, Alabama, to Macon, Georgia, (March 22 – April 24)
  - Plantersville, Alabama, and near Randolph, Alabama April 1.
  - Selma, Alabama April 2
  - Montgomery, Alabama April 12
  - Columbia, Alabama April 16
  - Capture of Macon, Georgia, April 20
- Pursuit of Jefferson Davis May 6–10
- Moved to Nashville, May 23 – June 15
- Mustered out of service at Nashville, on June 26, 1865.

=== Casualties ===
The regiment lost a total of 160 men during service; 2 officers and 26 enlisted men killed or mortally wounded, 2 officers and 130 enlisted men died of disease.

== Commanders ==
- Colonel Abram O. Miller
- Major Henry M. Cart – commanded at the battle of Stones River

== Notable members ==
- Sergeant James A. Mount, Company D – 24th governor of Indiana, 1897–1901

== See also ==
- List of Indiana Civil War regiments
- Indiana in the American Civil War
