= John T. Wilder =

United States Army general

John Thomas Wilder
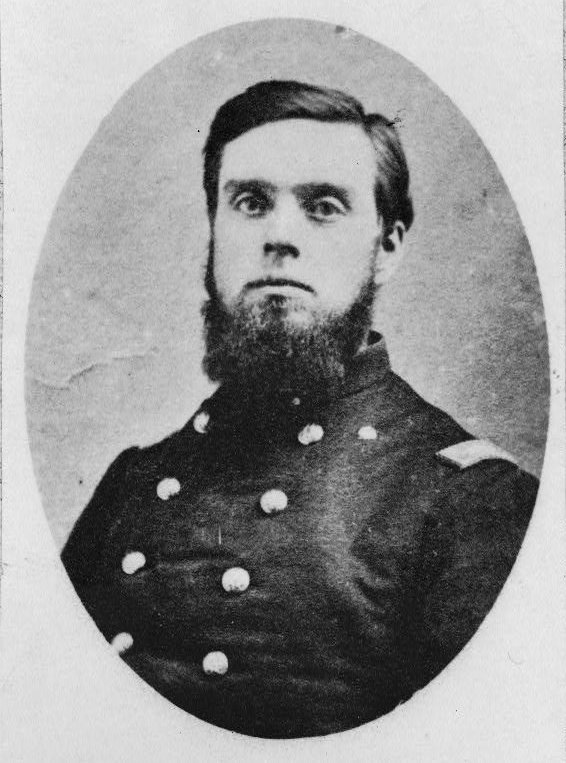
- John Thomas Wilder, c. 1861-65
- Born: January 31, 1830; Catskill Mountains in Hunter, New York
- Died: October 20, 1917 (aged 87); Jacksonville, Florida
- Burial place: Forest Hills Cemetery, Chattanooga, Tennessee
- Military career
- Allegiance: United States of America; Union
- Branch: Union Army
- Service years: 1861 – 1864
- Rank: Colonel; Brevet Brigadier General
- Commands: 17th Indiana Infantry Regiment; Lightning Brigade
- Conflicts: American Civil War: Siege of Corinth; Battle of Munfordville; Tullahoma Campaign: Second Battle of Chattanooga; Battle of Chickamauga; Chattanooga campaign Atlanta campaign

John Thomas Wilder (January 31, 1830 – October 20, 1917) was an officer in the Union Army during the American Civil War, noted principally for capturing the critical mountain pass of Hoover's Gap during the Tullahoma Campaign in Central Tennessee in June 1863. Wilder had personally ensured that his "Lightning Brigade" of mounted infantry was equipped with the new Spencer repeating rifle. However, Wilder initially had to appeal to his men to pay for these weapons themselves before the government agreed to carry the cost. The victory at Hoover's Gap was attributed largely to Wilder's persistence in procuring the new rifles, which disoriented the enemy.

== Early life and career ==
Wilder was born in the Catskill Mountains in Hunter, Greene County, New York, the son of Reuben and Mary (Merritt) Wilder. Wilder was a descendant of a long line of soldiers. His grandfather and great-grandfather, both named Seth Wilder, fought in the American Revolutionary War. After the great-grandfather lost a leg in the Battle of Bunker Hill, Seth, Jr. took his place. Wilder's father, Reuben, fought in the War of 1812.

Wilder spent his younger years in Hunter, where he attended school. When Wilder turned nineteen, his school days over, he decided to head west to make it on his own. Wilder soon arrived in Columbus, Ohio, nearly penniless, and found employment as drafter and then as an apprentice millwright at a local foundry. This training would lay the groundwork for his career.

In 1857, eight years after he arrived in Columbus, Wilder moved to Indiana, first to Lawrenceburg and then to Greensburg, where he married Martha Jane Stewart and raised a large family. Wilder established a small foundry of his own, rapidly becoming a success. Wilder invented many hydraulic machines that he patented, sold equipment, and built mills and hydraulic works in many of the surrounding states. Wilder also became nationally renowned as an expert in hydraulics, patenting a unique water wheel in 1859.

== Civil War ==
At the outbreak of the Civil War, Wilder organized a light artillery company in the Greensburg area, even going so far as to cast two six-pounder cannons at his foundry. Wilder's company was mustered into state service, but the Federal government declined to accept it, as Indiana had already met its quota of artillery units. Instead, Wilder was commissioned as a captain, and his men were organized as Company A, 17th Indiana Infantry Regiment at Indianapolis. When the 17th Indiana left for western Virginia in July 1861, Company A took along the two cannons. Once in Virginia, the old Company A was permanently detached and eventually reorganized as the 26th Independent Battery Indiana Light Artillery but was commonly known as the "Wilder Battery" in recognition of its first commander. Meanwhile, Captain Wilder was quickly promoted to lieutenant colonel of the 17th Indiana on June 4, 1861, serving where he remained during the early campaigns in Virginia and garrison duty in Kentucky. In March 1862, Wilder was promoted to colonel, becoming the commander of the 17th Indiana. During the campaign to take Corinth, Mississippi, Wilder quickly earned a reputation as a competent, and even gifted, regimental commander.

=== Initial operations ===
In the 1862 Confederate offensive into Kentucky, Gen. Braxton Bragg's army left Chattanooga, Tennessee, in late August. Bragg approached Munfordville, a station on the Louisville & Nashville Railroad where Wilder commanded the Union garrison, which consisted of three regiments with extensive fortifications. Wilder refused Brig. Gen. James R. Chalmers's demand to surrender on September 14, telling him, "I think we'll fight for a while", and his men repulsed Chalmers's attacks that day, inflicting 283 casualties with a loss of only 37. This forced the Confederates to conduct siege operations September 15–16. By this time, Wilder's 4,000 men were almost completely surrounded by 22,000 Confederates with 100 artillery pieces. Realizing that Union reinforcements were nearby and not wanting to kill or injure innocent civilians, the Confederates communicated still another demand for surrender. Wilder personally entered enemy lines blindfolded under a flag of truce, and Maj. Gen. Simon B. Buckner escorted him to view all the Confederate troops and to convince him of the futility of resisting. Impressed, Wilder surrendered his garrison. The formal ceremony occurred on September 17. Wilder spent two months as a prisoner of war before being exchanged.

On 22 December 1862 in Gallatin, Tennessee, Wilder took over command of the brigade which at that time consisted of the 92nd and 98th Illinois Infantry Regiments, the 17th, 72nd, and 75th Indiana Infantry Regiments, and the 18th Indiana Battery of Light Artillery. His initial combat mission was to pursue another of Morgan's raids into Kentucky intended to sever the Army of the Cumberland's primary supply line. Lacking sufficient cavalry to screen his army as he moved south toward what would be the Battle of Stones River as part of the Stones River Campaign, Major General William Rosecrans again had to use infantry to chase off Morgan. Trying to speed their movement, these infantry units deployed partially by rail. Wilder also unsuccessfully tried to replicate the use of mule-drawn wagons with the addition of men mounting the mules pulling the wagons. Unfortunately, they still traveled the majority of the pursuit on foot over unpaved roads. Despite the use of rail and wagons to speed up the pursuit, the mission was a failure, with Morgan's command escaping at the Rolling Fork River. The difference in speed between cavalry and infantry made the pursuit near impossible.

=== Innovative leader ===
In Wilder, an innovative and creative man, Rosecrans found an eager acolyte for mounted infantry as a solution. On 16 February 1863, Rosecrans authorized Wilder to mount his brigade. The regiments also voted on whether to convert to mounted infantry. All but the 75th Indiana voted to change to mounted infantry. The 123rd Illinois, who had wanted to become mounted infantry, transferred from the 1st Brigade of the 5th Division of XIV Corps to replace them. Through February 1863, Wilder obtained around a thousand mules to mount his command, not from the government but scavenged from the countryside. Due to the obstinacy of the mules, horses were frequently seized from local stocks in Tennessee as contraband and replaced the mules. Wilder boasted that it did “not cost the Government one dollar to mount my men.”

In theory and in practice, the brigade would use their mounts to travel rapidly to contact, but upon engagement, the soldiers would fight dismounted. Due to this speed of deployment, the unit earned the nickname, "The Lightning Brigade", and it would prove the validity of its conversion in the campaign in the Western theater. They were also sometimes known as the "Hatchet Brigade" because they received long-handled hatchets to carry instead of cavalry sabers.

As well as mounting the command for faster deployment, Wilder felt that muzzle-loaded rifles were too difficult to use traveling on horseback. Like Rosecrans, he also believed that the superiority of repeating rifles were worth their price in return for the great increase in firepower. The repeating rifles also had the standoff range similar to the standard infantry Lorenzes, Springfields, and Enfields in use by the Army of the Cumberland. He felt the repeating and breech loading carbines in use by the Federal cavalry lacked the accuracy at long range that his brigade would need.

While Rosecrans looked at the regiment's five-shot Colt revolving rifle that would equip other units in the Army of the Cumberland (particularly seeing action with the 21st Ohio Volunteer Infantry Union forces at Snodgrass Hill during the Battle of Chickamauga), Wilder was initially opting for the Henry repeating rifle as the proper weapon to arm his brigade. In early March, Wilder arranged a proposal for New Haven Arms Company (which later became famous as Winchester Repeating Arms) to supply his brigade with the sixteen-shot Henry if the soldiers paid for the weapons out of pocket. He had received backing from banks in Indiana on loans to be signed by each soldier and cosigned by Wilder. New Haven could not come to an agreement with Wilder despite the financing.

After attending a promotional demonstration by Christopher Spencer for the Army of the Cumberland of his Spencer repeating rifle, Wilder proposed the Henry arrangement to Spencer. Spencer agreed and got the Ordnance Department to send a shipment to the Army of the Cumberland. The majority of the shipment armed all men of the brigade.

The brigade's new weapon used a seven rimfire-cartridge tubular magazine that came through the butt. This rifle's increase in firepower would quickly make it one of the most effective weapons in the Civil War. With new mounts and new weapons, the brigade worked out new tactics. Alongside the Army of the Cumberland's other mounted infantry units, Wilder developed new training and tactics through May and June 1863. By the middle of the latter month, the brigade's soldiers had realized the advantages the breech-loading repeating rifle held over the muzzleloader, and they exuded confidence in themselves, their leaders, their new tactics, and their treasured new weapons.

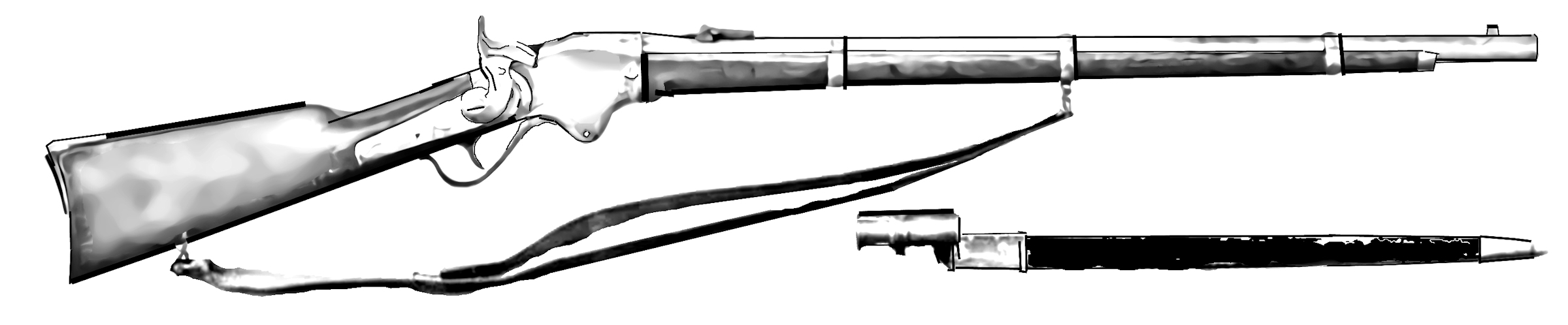
1862 Spencer Rifle with sling and bayonet

=== Mounted infantry actions ===
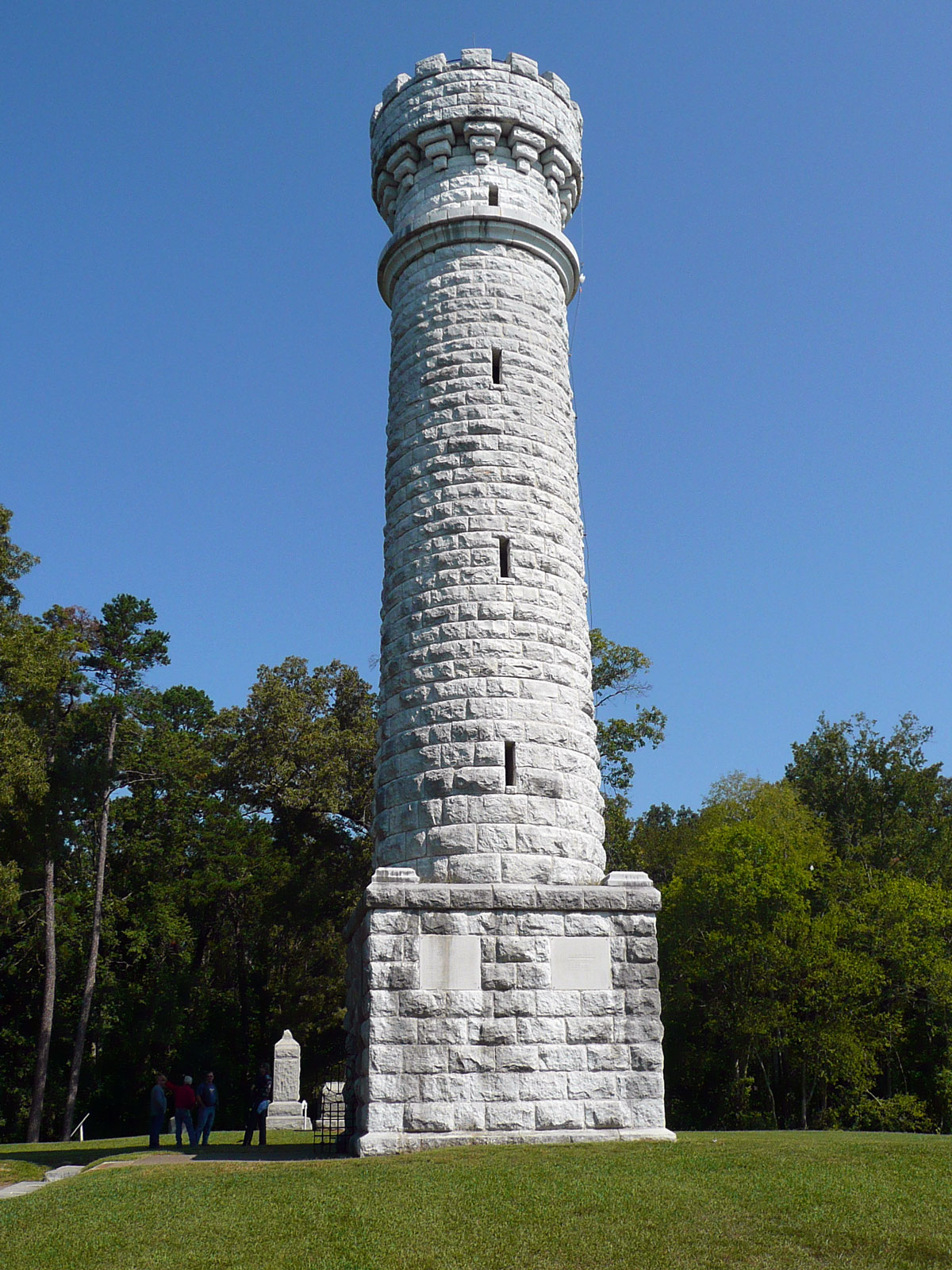
Wilder Brigade Monument at Chickamauga and Chattanooga National Military Park

Wilder received wide attention for his performance in the Tullahoma Campaign. Wilder mounted his brigade on horses and mules that his men appropriated from the local area and moved into the battle with such rapidity that his men soon became known as the "Lightning Brigade", comprising the 17th Indiana Infantry Regiment, the 72nd Indiana Infantry Regiment, the 98th Illinois Infantry Regiment, the 123rd Illinois Infantry Regiment, and the 18th Independent Battery Indiana Light Artillery. (They were also known as the "Hatchet Brigade" because Wilder issued them long-handled hatchets to carry instead of cavalry sabers.) His men also carried Spencer repeating rifles, which were capable of a rate of fire far greater than their Confederate adversaries. Bypassing Army red tape, Wilder had asked his men to vote on purchasing the rifles, and they agreed unanimously. Wilder obtained a loan from his hometown bank, and each man of the brigade co-signed a personal loan of $35 ($713 in 2019) for his rifle. Embarrassed, the Government paid for the weapons before the men expended any of their personal money.

On June 24, the Lightning Brigade seized and held Hoover's Gap. Despite orders from general Joseph J. Reynolds to fall back to his infantry, which was still six miles away, Wilder decided to hold the position, defeating repeated attempts to dislodge his force until the infantry arrived and winning the most significant battle in the Tullahoma Campaign. The Army of the Cumberland's commanding officer, William Rosecrans, soon arrived on the scene. Rather than reprimand Wilder for disobeying orders, he congratulated him for doing so, telling him it would have cost thousands of lives to take the position if he had abandoned it. Wilder was the principal commander of a diversion launched against Chattanooga - artillery bombardments known as the Second Battle of Chattanooga - deceiving the Confederates into thinking the Union army would approach Chattanooga from the north in conjunction with Union forces at Knoxville.

At the start of the Battle of Chickamauga, Wilder's brigade played a crucial role at Alexander's Bridge on September 18, 1863, defending the crossing of West Chickamauga Creek and helping to prevent the Confederates from flanking the Union army. On the third day at Chickamauga, September 20, Wilder's brigade, with its superior firepower, was one of the few units that were not immediately routed by the Confederate onslaught against the Union right flank. Advancing from its reserve position, the brigade launched a strong counterattack, driving the enemy around and through what became known as "Bloody Pond". Wilder decided to capitalize on this success by attacking the flank of the main Confederate column. However, just then, Assistant Secretary of War Charles A. Dana found Wilder and excitedly proclaimed that the battle was lost and demanded to be escorted to Chattanooga. In the time that Wilder took to calm down the secretary and arrange a small detachment to escort him back to safety, the opportunity for a successful attack was lost, and he ordered his men to withdraw to the west.

=== Post-Chickamauga ===
Maj. Gen. George H. Thomas formally commended Colonel Wilder for his performance at Chickamauga. Wilder did not directly participate in the main Battles for Chattanooga in November. Still, Wilder led the brigade during much of the Atlanta campaign in the spring and summer of 1864. Wilder was promoted to brevet brigadier general of volunteers on August 7, 1864. Throughout much of 1863 and 1864, Wilder suffered from bouts of dysentery brought on by a case of typhoid fever in 1862. For health reasons, Wilder resigned from the Army in October 1864 and returned home.

== Postwar career ==
John T. Wilder

24th Mayor of Chattanooga
- In office 1871–1872
- Preceded by: William P. Rathburn
- Succeeded by: Josiah J. Bryan

After the war, Wilder settled in Rockwood, Tennessee, and later in Chattanooga. In 1867, Wilder founded an ironworks in the Chattanooga region, then built and operated the first two blast furnaces in the South at Rockwood, Tennessee. In 1870, Wilder established a company in Chattanooga to manufacture railroad rails. From 1884 to 1892, Wilder helped promote and construct the Charleston, Cincinnati & Chicago Railroad while living in Johnson City, Tennessee. While in Johnson City, Wilder developed the booming industrial suburb of Carnegie, named in honor of fellow industrialist Andrew Carnegie, and a host of iron-making and railroad-related manufacturing facilities. Iron ore was brought to Johnson City via the East Tennessee and Western North Carolina Railroad. Wilder constructed a popular 166-room hotel near Johnson City, named the Cloudland Hotel, near the summit of Roan Mountain, to serve tourists via this scenic narrow gauge railway line.

Wilder entered politics, and was elected mayor of Chattanooga in 1871. Wilder resigned a year later to pursue his business interests. He unsuccessfully ran for the United States Congress in 1876. In 1877, Wilder accepted the position of city postmaster, serving until 1882.

Wilder moved to Knoxville, Tennessee, in 1897 after receiving an appointment from President William McKinley as a Federal pension agent, then was commissioner of the Chickamauga and Chattanooga National Military Park.

Wilder died in Jacksonville, Florida, aged 87, while on his annual winter vacation with his second wife, Dora Lee, and was returned for burial in Forest Hills Cemetery in Chattanooga with his first wife, Martha Jane Stewart.

Two of Wilder's homes in Tennessee, the General John T. Wilder House in Knoxville and the John T. Wilder House in Roan Mountain, are listed on the National Register of Historic Places. Another that Wilder built in Greensburg, Indiana is commemorated by a historical marker.
