= Lightning Brigade (disambiguation) =

Lightning Brigade can refer to:

- Lightning Brigade (US Army of the Cumberland 1863), a brigade in the 19-century Union Army
- Paratroopers Brigade "Folgore", a unit of the Italian army
- Danab Brigade, a unit of the Somali Armed Forces
