= Wilder Brigade Monument =

Public monument in Georgia to the Lightning Brigade

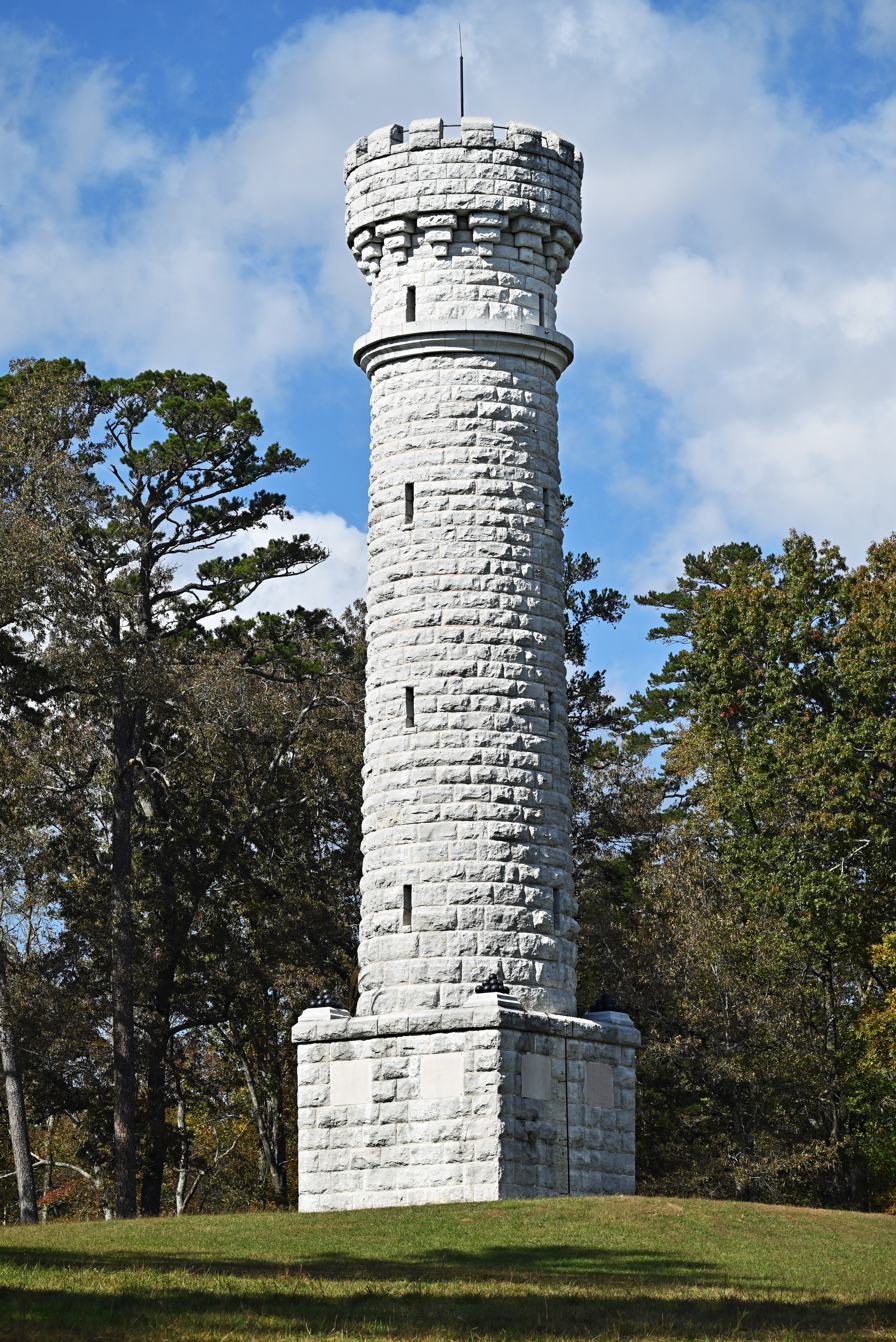
- The monument, south side
- Location: Chickamauga and Chattanooga National Military Park, Walker County, Georgia, United States
- Coordinates: 34.90742°N 85.27245°W
- Designer: Harry Hargraves; Edward E. Betts
- Type: tower
- Material: limestone
- Length: 19 ft (5.8 m)
- Width: 19 ft (5.8 m)
- Height: 85 ft (26 m)
- Beginning date: 1892
- Completion date: 1903
- Dedicated date: September 20, 1899
- Dedicated to: The Lightning Brigade

The Wilder Brigade Monument (also known as the Wilder Tower) is a large public monument located at the Chickamauga and Chattanooga National Military Park in Walker County, Georgia, United States. The monument, which consists of a stone watchtower, was erected to honor the Lightning Brigade (led by John T. Wilder) of the Northern Union Army's Army of the Cumberland. The brigade participated in the Battle of Chickamauga during the American Civil War, with the monument located on the battlefield where the brigade fought.

== History ==
=== Background ===
In mid-1863, during the American Civil War, the Army of the Cumberland (Union Army) was conducting a military campaign targeting the city of Chattanooga, Tennessee. By September of that year, the Army of Tennessee (Confederate States Army) had withdrawn from Tennessee and into north Georgia, near Lafayette, Georgia. Starting on September 18, the two armies fought in the Battle of Chickamauga, which lasted until September 20 and was one of the bloodiest battles in the war, with approximately 35,000 soldiers killed, wounded, captured, or missing. During the battle, Union officer John T. Wilder led his brigade (known as the Lightning Brigade) into action.

=== Construction and dedication ===
Several years later, in August 1890, several former officers from the brigade met to discuss a brigade reunion. At that time, the idea of a monument honoring the brigade at the Chickamauga battlefield was brought up. Wilder approved of the idea and promised to match whatever funds were raised by the brigade, with the plan to have each regiment contribute $1,000 ($35,000 adjusted for inflation) and the battery contribute $500 ($17,000 in 2024). The monument would be the first one erected on the battlefield. In August 1891, a monument organization was created at the reunion, and fundraising commenced. Fundraising was initially successful, and in early 1892, construction of the monument began. However, by 1893, fundraising had slowed, and the financial situation was worsened by a bank failure at a Tennessee bank holding $1,200 ($42,000 in 2024) for the organization. As a result, work stopped, with the monument only partially constructed. In 1895, another reunion held at the battlefield led to additional money being raised, but not enough to restart construction. In 1897, Indianapolis businessman Arthur McKain donated $1,200 to Wilder to help fund the monument, and construction resumed shortly afterward. While initial monument designs were drawn up by Harry Hargraves, they had undergone significant revisions, and by the time construction restarted, E. E. Betts had modified the design. By 1898, Wilder stated that the monument would be dedicated the following year.

The monument was formally dedicated on September 20, 1899. Many local citizens and Civil War veterans, including many members of the Lightning Brigade, were present at the ceremony. James A. Connolly gave an opening address for the ceremony, which was followed by Wilder turning the monument over to general Henry V. Boynton. Boynton accepted on behalf of the Chickamauga and Chattanooga National Military Park. Additional speeches were then given by Union Army captain William Rule and Confederate States Army colonel Tomlinson Fort. A brief tribute to the brigade was read aloud before additional addresses were given by general Smith D. Atkins, Indiana Governor James A. Mount, and Frank E. Benjamin. Construction was later completed in 1903. In 1914, the tower was damaged by a lightning strike and was later repaired.

=== Marjorie Taylor Greene visit ===
In October 2022, United States Representative Marjorie Taylor Greene, whose congressional district includes the military park, visited the tower and posted several pictures of herself at the site on Truth Social. The social media post received significant media coverage because Greene initially captioned the photographs, "Tonight, I stopped at the Wilder Monument in Chickamuaga, GA, which honors the Confederate soldiers of the Wilder Brigade. I will always defend our nation's history!", with several publications noting that the monument honors Union and not Confederate soldiers. The post was later edited to remove the word "Confederate". Reporting on the incident, The Independent noted that Greene was one of several Republican politicians opposed to the removal of Confederate monuments and memorials.

== Design ==
The monument consists of a watch tower made from limestone quarried from near the battlefield. The height of the tower is 85 ft (26 m), while the total height including a flagpole at the top of the tower is 105 ft (32 m). Initial plans would have seen the tower stand either 60 ft (18 m) or 105 ft (32 m) tall, but the plans were altered during construction. The square base of the tower has sides measuring 19 ft (5.8 m), while the diameter of the circular tower is 16 ft (4.9 m). The inside of the tower contains a spiral staircase leading to the top, and the interior tapers from a base diameter of 10 ft (3.0 m) to 9.5 ft (2.9 m) at the top. Small rectangular windows are present around the tower on each side. It is located on the southern end of the battlefield.

== See also ==
- List of Union Civil War monuments and memorials

== Bibliography ==
- Bollinger, Alex (October 19, 2022). "Marjorie Taylor Greene tried to honor the Confederacy but failed spectacularly". LGBTQ Nation. Archived from the original on December 5, 2022.
- Brigham, Bob (October 18, 2022). "Marjorie Taylor Greene visits Union Army monument — which she says honors 'Confederate soldiers'". Raw Story. Archived from the original on December 29, 2022.
- Dedication of the Wilder Brigade Monument on Chickamaugua Battlefield on the Thirty-sixth Anniversary of the Battle, September 20, 1899. Marshall, Illinois: The Herald Press. 1900 – via Google Books.
- Garcia, Eric (October 20, 2022). "Marjorie Taylor Greene's tribute to Confederate soldiers hilariously backfires". The Independent. Archived from the original on October 31, 2022.
- "Chickamauga Battlefield". National Park Service. Archived from the original on April 21, 2021.
- Norton, Tom (October 20, 2022). "Fact Check: Did Marjorie Taylor Greene Get Her Confederate History Wrong?". Newsweek. Archived from the original on February 28, 2023.
- Petrizzo, Zachary (October 20, 2022) [October 19, 2022]. "Marjorie Taylor Greene Tries to Take a Stand for 'Confederate Soldiers' Using Monument to Union Troops". The Daily Beast. Archived from the original on October 31, 2022.
- Smith, Timothy B. (2009). A Chickamauga Memorial: The Establishment of America's First Civil War National Military Park. Knoxville, Tennessee: University of Tennessee Press. ISBN 978-1-57233-679-7 – via Google Books.
- War Department Annual Reports, 1915. Vol. I. United States Department of War. Washington, D.C.: Government Printing Office. 1916 – via Google Books.
