= 18th Independent Battery Indiana Light Artillery =

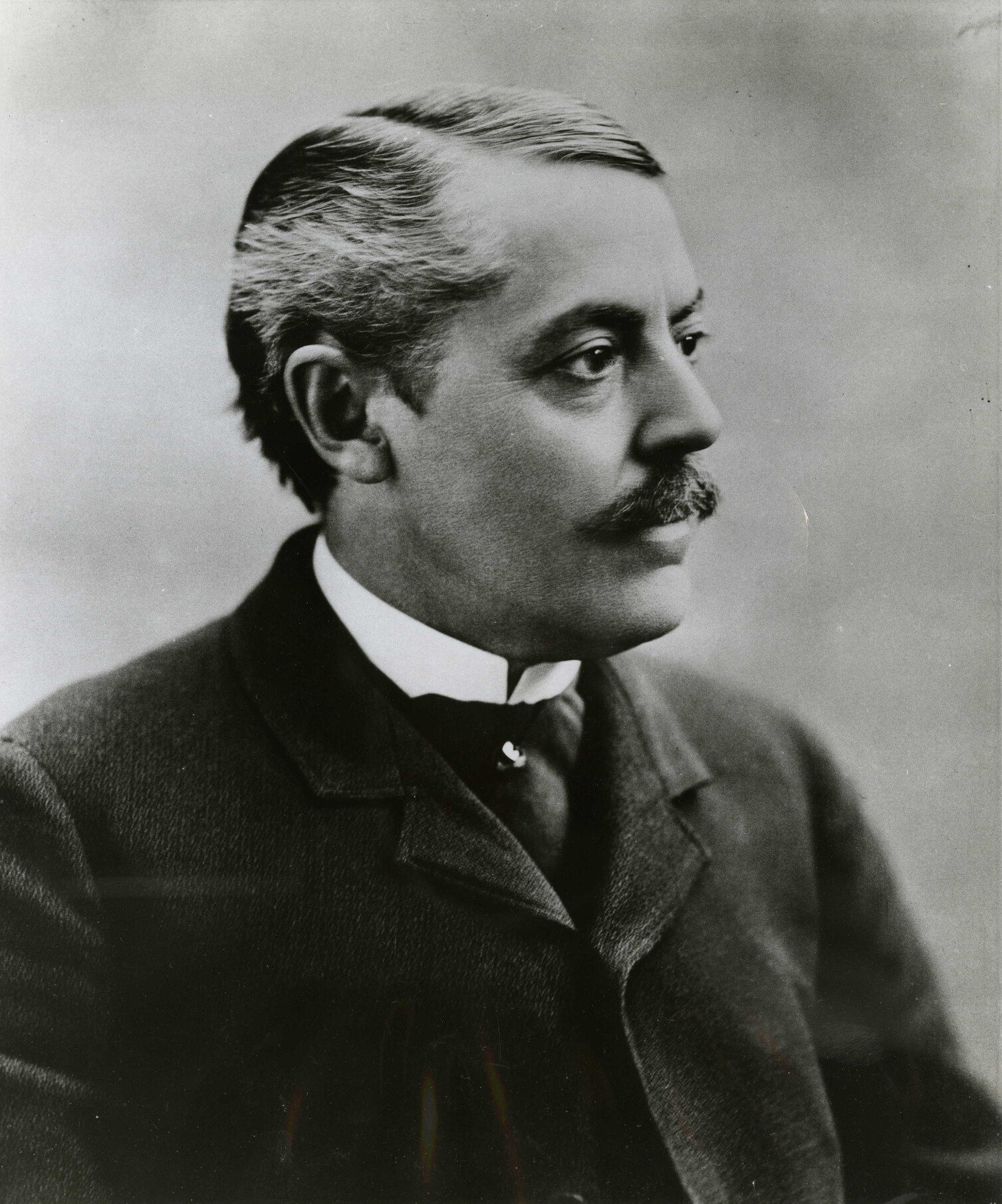
- Colonel Eli Lilly in 1885
- Active: August 14, 1862 – September 16, 1865
- Country: United States
- Allegiance: Union
- Branch: Artillery
- Engagements: Battle of Hoover's Gap; Second Battle of Chattanooga; Davis's Cross Roads; Battle of Chickamauga; Atlanta campaign; Battle of Resaca; Battle of Kennesaw Mountain

Commanders
- Notable commanders: Eli Lilly

Insignia
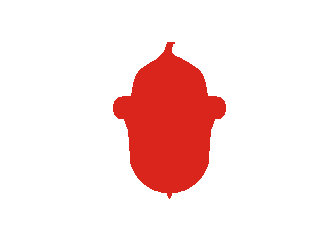
- 1st Division, XIV Corps

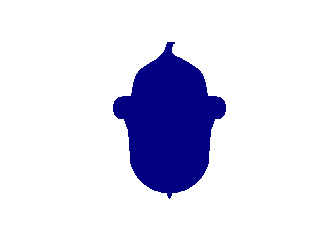
- 4th Division, XIV Corps

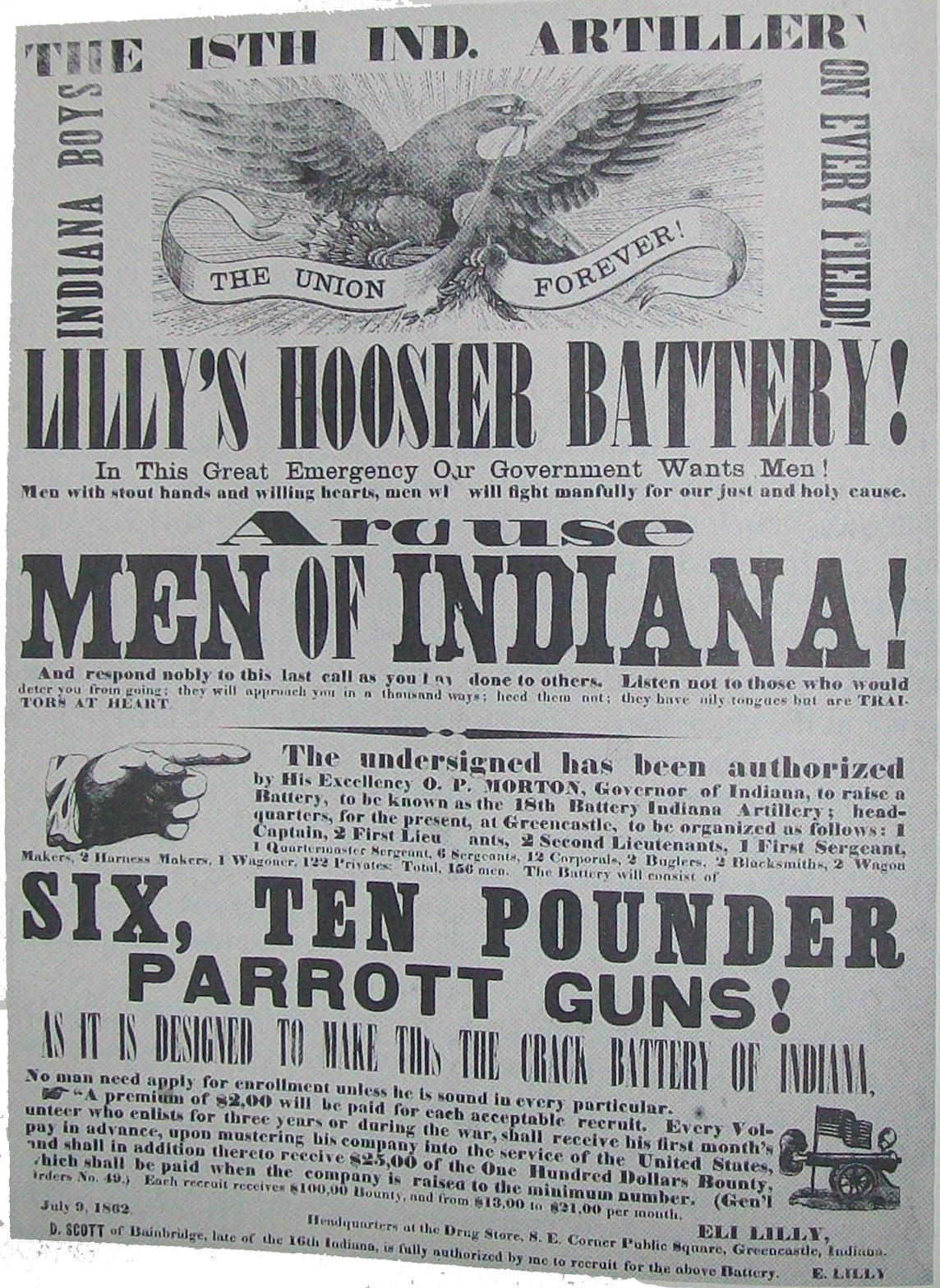
A recruitment poster for the 18th Battery

The 18th Independent Battery Indiana Light Artillery, also known as Lilly's Hoosier Battery and Lilly's Battery, was a civil war artillery battery formed in Indiana during the American Civil War. The battery was formed at the end of 1860 by 22-year-old Eli Lilly, an Indianapolis pharmacist. He had recruitment posters placed around the city and recruited primarily among his friends and classmates. The unit were first issued 6 "Rodman Guns" (3-inch ordnance rifle) and was manned by 156 men. The Battery members stated preference to 3" Ordnance Rifles over the 10 pound Parrott Rifle due to its tendency to bursting. The unit mustered in Indianapolis where it was drilled during 1861, excelling at their skill with firing accuracy. Lilly was elected captain of the unit in August 1862 when the unit was deployed to join the Lightning Brigade (Note: It acquired the names due to the movement speed that was gained by mounting the brigade, and also by the hatchets/tomohawks that Wilder had issued initially. See Lightning Brigade article for more.) (1st Brigade - Wilder, 4th Division - Reynolds, 14th Corp. - Thomas) commanded by Col. John T. Wilder.

A total of 52 recruits were from Montgomery County, Indiana 49 from Putnam County, Indiana 20 from Vigo County, Indiana 20 from Indianapolis, 8 from Fountain, Indiana, 6 from Madison, Indiana, and single digits from Hendrix and Shelby County, Indiana.

A total of 77 men were from Indiana, 26 from other free states, 14 from slave states, 7 foreigners (5 Irishmen, 1 Englishman, and 1 Prussian) 27 men unknown.

A total of 78 men gave their occupations as farmers, 27 as other occupations (blacksmith, bricklayer, brickmaker, luther, carpenter, carriage maker, clerk, cooper, druggist, engineer, harness maker, horticulturist, mechanic, miller, nurseryman, painter, physician, saddler, shoemaker, silversmith, student, tanner, teacher, wagonmaker, and woolen factory attendant). One man listed "none", and 16 unknown. Of the 156 men who enlisted in 1862, only 77 were present when the battery mustered out in 1865.

The unit first saw action in the Battle of Hoover's Gap, and was later in the Second Battle of Chattanooga and the Battle of Chickamauga. The unit was enlisted for three years, and most members left the unit in the end of 1863. Several members, including Lilly reenlisted when their term expired, but were assigned to new units.

== See also ==
- Eli Lilly
- List of Indiana Civil War regiments
- Indiana in the Civil War
