= Battle of Hoover's Gap =

Battle of the American Civil War

Coordinates: 35.6305°N 86.2454°W

- Part of the American Civil War
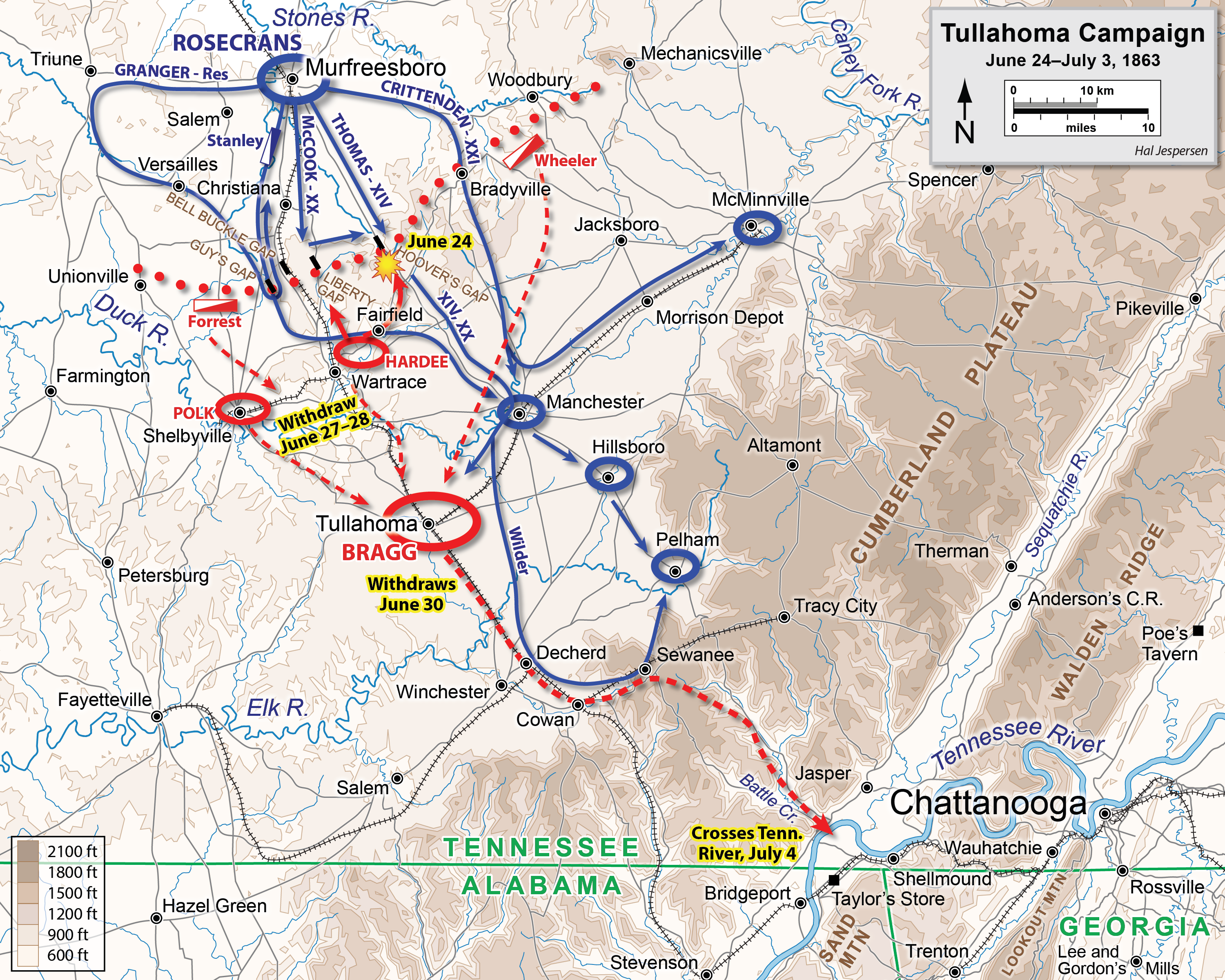
- Tullahoma Campaign
Date	June 24, 1863 – June 26, 1863
Location	Bedford County, Tennessee and Rutherford County, Tennessee
Result	Union victory

Belligerents
United States (Union)	(Confederate States of America) CSA (Confederacy)

Commanders and leaders
William Rosecrans; John T. Wilder	Alexander P. Stewart; William B. Bate

Units involved
XIV Corps	Stewart's Division

Casualties and losses
61	146

The Battle of Hoover's Gap (24 June 1863) was the principal battle in the Tullahoma Campaign of the American Civil War, in which Union General William S. Rosecrans drove General Braxton Bragg’s Confederates out of Central Tennessee. Rosecrans’ feigned move on the western end of the Confederate line had left the eastern mountain passes lightly defended, and Colonel John T. Wilder's mounted infantry achieved total surprise when they attacked Hoover's Gap. Success was attributed both to Rosecrans’ brilliant deception tactics and the high morale of Wilder’s "Lightning Brigade", equipped with the new Spencer repeating rifle.

== Background ==
Following the Battle of Stones River, Maj. Gen. William Rosecrans, commanding the Union Army of the Cumberland, remained in the Murfreesboro, Tennessee, area for over five months. In an effort to block further Union progress, Confederate Gen. Braxton Bragg, commander of the Army of Tennessee, established a fortified line along the Duck River from Shelbyville to Wartrace. On the Confederate right, infantry and artillery detachments guarded Liberty, Hoover's, and Bellbuckle Gaps through the Highland Rim (near Beechgrove, Tennessee). Rosecrans's superiors, fearing that Bragg might detach large numbers of men to help break the Siege of Vicksburg, urged him to attack the Confederate positions.

One of the Army of the Cumberland brigade commanders, Colonel John T. Wilder was impressed by the ability of Confederate General John Hunt Morgan to raid behind Federal lines in Kentucky. When he found that Rosecrans wanted to increase the strength of his mounted force, Wilder proposed to mount his infantry brigade by launching raids of the surrounding countryside to steal horses. Rosecrans gave him permission. By the middle of April 1863, Wilder's brigade was fully mounted. Having witnessed a demonstration of a new repeating rifle by Christopher Miner Spencer in March, Wilder determined to arm his brigade with that weapon. Wilder got his soldiers' whole-hearted support to re-arm them with the Spencer repeating rifle, and each soldier pledged a note for $35. With notes in hand, Wilder co-signed them and took out a loan from his hometown banks. Soon the brigade was armed with the new seven-shot repeaters and began performing spirited mounted service.

== Battle ==
On June 23, 1863, Rosecrans deployed forces to feign an attack on Shelbyville while massing forces against Bragg's right. Union troops struck out toward the gaps. On June 24, Maj. Gen. George H. Thomas's men, spearheaded by Colonel Wilder's "Lightning Brigade", attacked Hoover's Gap. Wilder's mounted infantry pushed ahead and reached the gap nearly 9 mi (14 km) ahead of Thomas's main body. Wilder's men were armed with new Spencer repeating rifles, and when they attacked, the Confederate 1st Kentucky Cavalry (converged with the 3rd Kentucky Cavalry) under Colonel J. Russell Butler, was easily pushed aside. As Butler's unit fell back the entire 7 mi (11 km) mile length of Hoover's Gap, it ran into Brig. Gen. William B. Bate's brigade of Maj. Gen. Alexander P. Stewart's division.

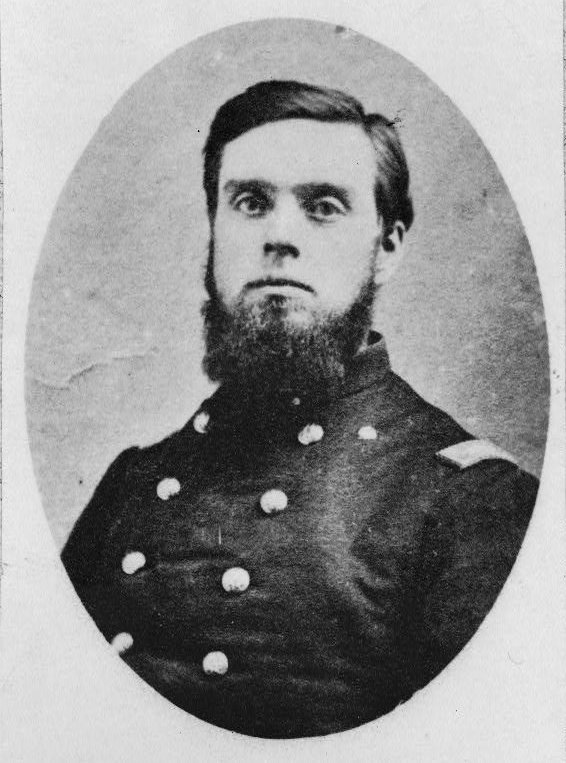
John T. Wilder

It had been reported to Wilder that Bate's brigade defended the top of the gap. However, Wilder found the summit unoccupied, and his soldiers could see Bate's camp in the valley below. Wilder dismounted his troops and prepared to hold the gap despite orders from his division commander Maj. Gen. Joseph J. Reynolds to retreat. Wilder entrenched on the hills south of the gap and determined to hold this extremely advanced position. Bate's brigade counterattacked throughout the day but could not dislodge the Federals. When he received orders to fall back through the gap, Wilder refused, claiming he could hold his ground. Meanwhile, Brig. Gen. Bushrod Johnson's brigade arrived, and now Bate and Johnson planned a final attack on Wilder. This attack was also repulsed, and by 7:00 p.m. units from Lovell Rousseau and John M. Brannan's divisions of Thomas's corps arrived at the gap.

When Wilder saw Generals Rosecrans and Thomas riding up to his position, he expected to be chastised for ignoring orders to withdraw. Instead, he rode to Rosecrans and explained that he had disobeyed orders because he knew his soldiers were capable of holding the gap. Rosecrans was thrilled and shook Wilder's hand, saying, "Thank God for your decision. It would have cost us 2,000 lives to have taken this position if you had given it up." Just then, Reynolds arrived. Before he could say a word, Rosecrans told him, "Wilder has done right. Promote him." The Federals inflicted 146 casualties on the Confederates while sustaining only 61 casualties.

Just before noon on June 26, Stewart sent a message to Johnson and Bate stating that he was pulling back, and they should also. Although slowed by rain, Rosecrans moved on, forcing Bragg to retreat from his defensive line and fall back to Tullahoma. After reaching Tullahoma, Rosecrans sent Wilder's Lightning Brigade ahead to hit the railroad in Bragg's rear. Arriving too late to destroy the Elk River railroad bridge, the Federals destroyed the railroad track around Decherd.

== Aftermath ==
Bragg evacuated his forces from Middle Tennessee and withdrew to the city of Chattanooga, Tennessee. Rosecrans followed and captured that city on September 8, 1863. Maneuvering then continued in the Chickamauga Campaign. Rosecrans was frustrated that the victory at Hoover's Gap and the Tullahoma Campaign were overshadowed by two other Union victories in the summer of 1863, the Siege of Vicksburg and Battle of Gettysburg.

== Forces ==
=== Union order of battle ===
Brigade: Col. John T. Wilder
Units	Commander
98th Illinois Infantry Regiment (Mounted)	Col. John J. Funkhouser
123rd Illinois Infantry Regiment (Mounted)	Col. James Monroe
17th Indiana Infantry Regiment (Mounted)	Lt. Col. Henry Jordan
72nd Indiana Infantry Regiment (Mounted)	Col. Abraham O. Miller

=== Confederate order of battle ===
Brigade: Brig. Gen. William B. Bate
Unit	Killed	Wounded	Casualties
9th Alabama Infantry Battalion	0	5	5
37th Georgia Volunteer Infantry Regiment	3	45	48
Consoldidated 15th and 37th Tennessee Infantry Regiment	1	5	6
20th Tennessee Infantry Regiment	9	24	33
Caswell's (4th) Georgia Sharpshooter Battalion	4	39	43
Eufala Alabama Battery	2	6	8
Maney's Battery	0	2	2
Totals	19	126	145
