= Beechgrove, Coffee County, Tennessee =

Beechgrove, Tennessee
- Unincorporated community
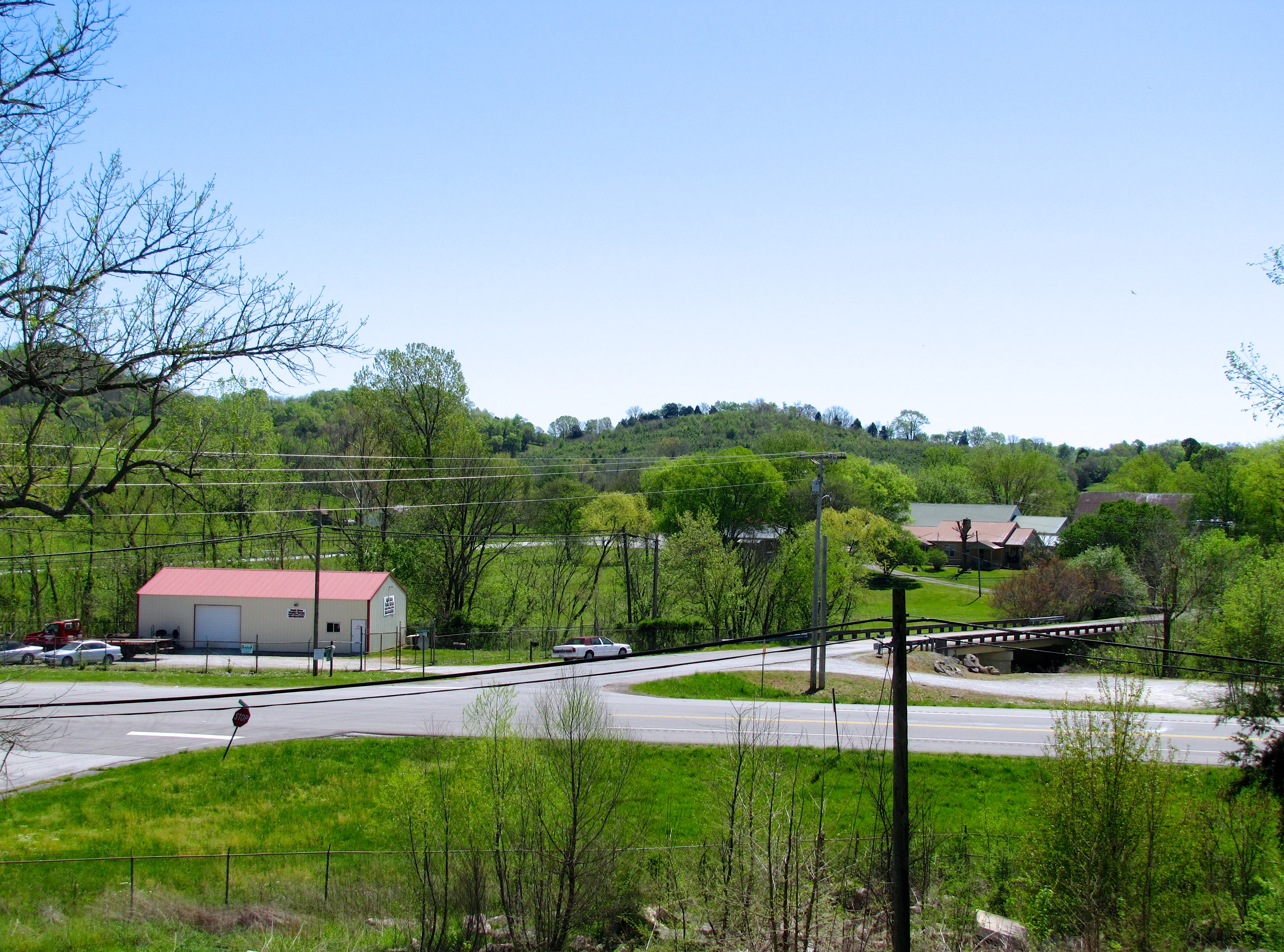
- Beechgrove, viewed from the Beech Grove Confederate Cemetery

- Location within Tennessee Location within the United States
- Coordinates: 35°37′37″N 86°14′25″W
- Country: United States
- State: Tennessee
- County: Coffee
- Elevation: 876 ft (267 m)
- Time zone: UTC-6 (Central (CST))
  - Summer (DST): UTC-5 (CDT)
- ZIP code(s): 37018
- Area code: 931
- GNIS feature ID: 1269328

Beechgrove, also known as Beech Grove, is an unincorporated community in Coffee County, Tennessee, United States. Beechgrove is located in northwestern Coffee County at the junction of Interstate 24, U.S. Route 41, and State Route 64. Beechgrove has a post office with ZIP code 37018.

Beechgrove, Tennessee, was named "Beech Grove," until zip codes were assigned to U.S. Post Offices. At that time the post office named "Beech Grove" in another county was given its zip code before the Coffee County location received its code; thus to avoid confusion among postal users, and the Postal system itself, Beech Grove (Coffee County), Tennessee was changed, officially, to "Beechgrove." Locals living there protested to postal authorities, but to no avail. The name "stuck," so to speak.

== History ==
The community was named from the presence of beech trees near the town site. A post office has been in operation at Beechgrove since 1836. Between June 24–26, 1863, the Battle of Hoover's Gap was fought around Beechgrove. The Beechgrove Confederate Cemetery now occupies a portion of the battlefield, on top of a hill overlooking present-day I-24. It contains 56 graves; 52 are of unknown soldiers.
