= Snodgrass Hill =

Mountain in Georgia, United States

Coordinates: 34°55′40″N 85°16′14″W

Snodgrass Hill is a summit in Walker County, Georgia. With an elevation of 896 feet (273 m), Snodgrass Hill is the 886th highest summit in the state of Georgia. Snodgrass Hill was named for George Washington Snodgrass, a pioneer who settled there. Snodgrass Hill was involved in the Battle of Chickamauga and was fought at over on September 20, 1863.

== See also ==
- Chickamauga and Chattanooga National Military Park
