= Second Battle of Chattanooga =

Battle in the American Civil War

Coordinates: 35.0739°N 85.3186°W

- Part of the American Civil War
Date	August 21, 1863
Location	Chattanooga, Tennessee
Result	Union victory

Belligerents
United States (Union)	(Confederate States of America) CSA (Confederacy)

Commanders and leaders
John T. Wilder	Daniel H. Hill

Units involved
Wilder's "Lightning" Brigade	Hill's Corps

Casualties and losses
?	?

The Second Battle of Chattanooga took place during the American Civil War, beginning on August 21, 1863, as the opening battle in the Chickamauga Campaign. The larger and more famous battles were the Battles for Chattanooga (generally referred to as the Battle of Chattanooga) in November 1863.

== Background ==
On August 16, 1863, Maj. Gen. William S. Rosecrans, commander of the Army of the Cumberland, launched a campaign to take Chattanooga, Tennessee. Col. John T. Wilder's brigade of the Union 4th Division, XIV Army Corps, marched to a location northeast of Chattanooga where the Confederates could see them, reinforcing Gen. Braxton Bragg's expectations of a Union attack on the town from that direction.

== Battle ==
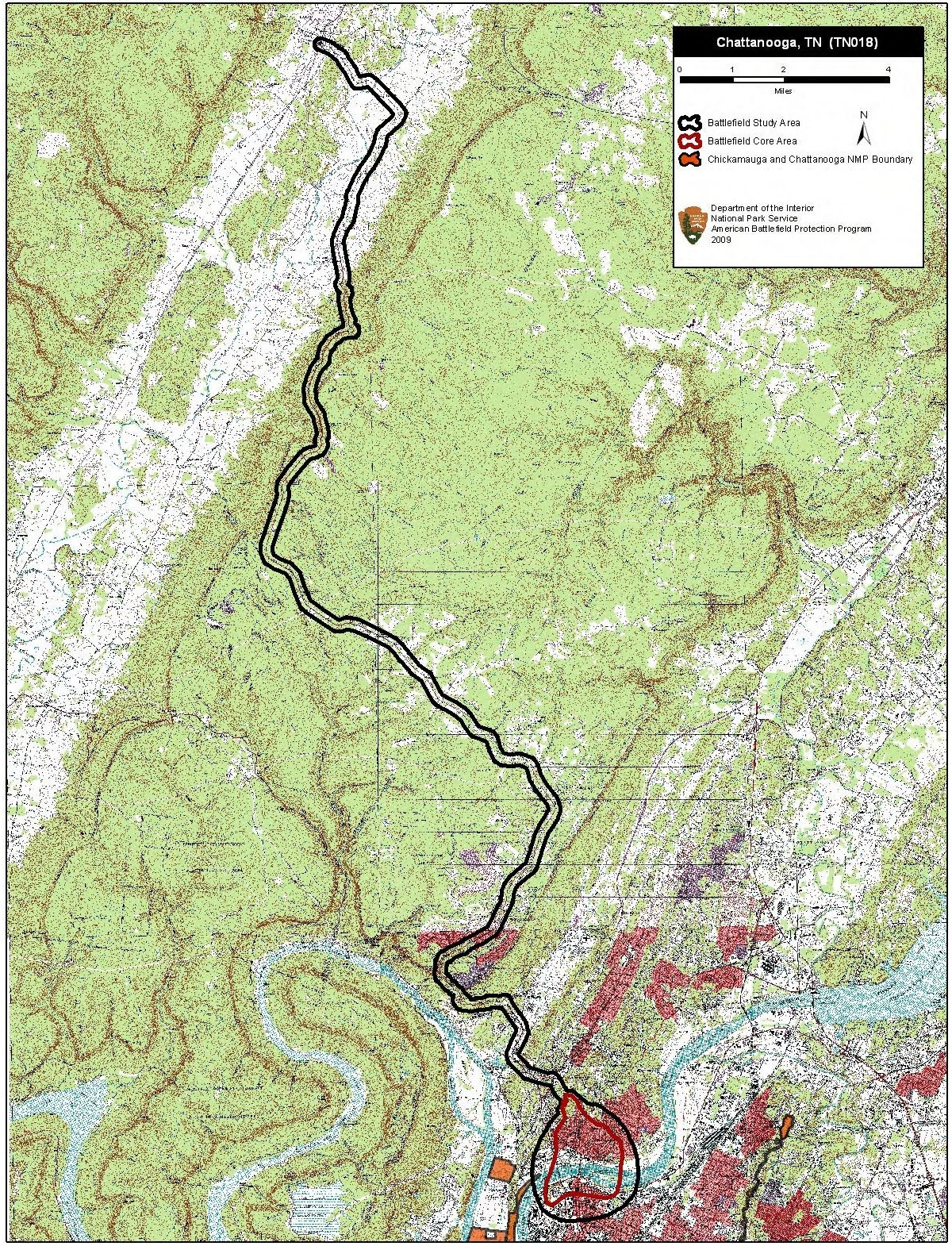
Map of Chattanooga II Battlefield core and study areas by the American Battlefield Protection Program

On August 21, Wilder reached the Tennessee River opposite Chattanooga and ordered the 18th Indiana Light Artillery (Capt. Eli Lilly's battery) to begin shelling the town. The shells caught many soldiers and civilians in town in church observing a day of prayer and fasting. The bombardment sank two steamers docked at the landing and created a great deal of consternation amongst the Confederates.

== Aftermath ==
Continuing periodically over the next two weeks, the shelling helped keep Bragg's attention to the northeast while the bulk of Rosecrans's army crossed the Tennessee River well west and south of Chattanooga. When Bragg learned on September 8 that the Union army was in force southwest of the city, he abandoned Chattanooga and marched his Army of Tennessee into Georgia. Bragg's army marched down the LaFayette Road and camped in the city of LaFayette.

== Battlefield preservation ==
The American Battlefield Trust and its partners have acquired and preserved more than 405 acres (1.64 km^{2}) of the battlefield at Chattanooga as of mid-2023.

== See also ==
- First Battle of Chattanooga
