= 17th Indiana Infantry Regiment =

17th Indiana Infantry Regiment; 17th Indiana Mounted Infantry Regiment
- US Flag 1863-1865
- Active: June 12, 1861 – August 1865
- Country: United States of America
- Allegiance: Union Army
- Branch: Army
- Type: Infantry; Mounted Infantry (1863–1864)
- Equipment: Spencer repeating rifle
- Engagements: Battle of Greenbrier River; Siege of Corinth; Tullahoma Campaign; Battle of Hoover's Gap; Battle of Chickamauga; Atlanta campaign; Battle of Rome Cross Roads; Battle of Kennesaw Mountain; Battle of Marietta; Battle of New Hope Church; Battle of Ladiga; Battle of Ebenezer Church; Battle of Selma; Battle of Columbus

Commanders
- Notable commanders: Col. Milo S. Hascall; Col. John T. Wilder; Col. Jacob G. Vail

Insignia
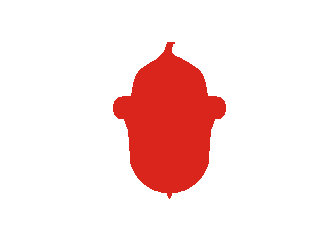
- 1st Division, XIV Corps

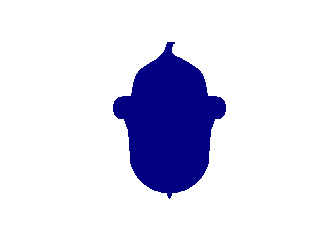
- 4th Division, XIV Corps

The 17th Indiana Infantry Regiment, also known as 17th Indiana Mounted Infantry Regiment, was an infantry and mounted infantry regiment that served in the Union Army from 1863 to 1865 during the American Civil War. It served in West Virginia before being transferred to the Western Theater. In that theater, it was known for its membership in the "Lightning Brigade." (Note: It acquired the names due to the movement speed that was gained by mounting the brigade, and also by the hatchets/tomahawks that Wilder had issued initially. See Lightning Brigade article for more.)

== Service ==
The 17th Indiana was organized at Camp Morton, Indianapolis, Indiana, and mustered into the United States service on Wednesday, June 12, 1861, by Lieut. Col. Thomas J. Wood, U. S. A., for an initial 3-year enlistment. When the regiment was first organized there were ten full companies, but in October 1861, Company A was taken out and organized into an artillery company, thus leaving only nine companies, until August 1862. A new Company A was recruited and added, making a full quota of companies of the regiment again. The regiment had a full complement of officers and men, mostly young men under twenty-one years of age.

The regiment was initially commanded by Col. Milo S. Hascall of Goshen, an 1852 graduate of West Point who had resigned his commission before the war and entered law and Indiana politics. (Note: Born in LeRoy in Genesee County, New York. Hascall moved to Goshen in 1846, where he clerked in a store and taught school for two years until appointed to the United States Military Academy. He graduated in 1852 as a second lieutenant in the 2nd U.S. Artillery and served garrison duty in Newport Harbor, Rhode Island for a year before resigning and returning to Goshen. He entered the law profession and filled various political offices. He also was a railroad contractor, district attorney, and the clerk of the county courts. He practiced law from 1855 till 1861, serving as prosecuting attorney of Elkhart and Lagrange counties from 1856 till 1858, and school examiner and clerk of courts from 1859 till 1861.) The Lieutenant Colonel was John T. Wilder of Greensburg, and the major was George W. Gorman of Owensville. The Adjutant was Edward R. Kerstetter also of Goshen and the quartermaster was Winston P. Noble of Indianapolis.

=== Initial infantry service ===
On Monday, July 1, it marched through Indianapolis and got aboard cars on Indiana & Cincinnati Railroad arriving at Lawrenceburg on the Ohio that night. The next morning they boarded a steamboat and moved twenty miles upriver to Cincinnati. On Thursday afternoon, July 4, it boarded the Marietta Railroad and after travelling through the night was in Parkersburg, West Virginia on Friday. It was subsequently attached to the District of the Kanawha. Remaining there for two and a half weeks, on Tuesday, July 23, it took the train and moved to Oakland, Maryland. Marching sixteen miles from there to the north branch of the Potomac, it built fortifications known as Camp Pendleton until Wednesday, August 7. Taking rail from Oakland to Webster, and then marching up Tygart's Valley to Huttonsville, the regiment reached Cheat Mountain Pass on the following Wednesday and encamped at Elkwater. While in this vicinity the 17th participated in the operations of Brig. Gen. Reynolds' army, including the battle of Green Brier, on Thursday, October 3, in which its loss was one killed.

On November 19, it proceeded to Louisville, Kentucky, where it reported to Maj. Gen. Don Carlos Buell on Saturday, November 30, and camped there at the defunct Oakland Race Course for ten days. Being assigned to General Nelson's Division, on December 10, the regiment marched to Camp Wickliffe, near New Haven, where it remained until Monday, February 10, 1862, when it moved toward Green River. Crossing Green River, it marched southward, arriving at Nashville thirty days later on Wednesday, March 12, and stayed there until the march to the Tennessee began.

Col. Milo Hascall was promoted to Brigadier-General on March 25, and Governor Oliver P. Morton appointed John T. Wilder as the regiment's colonel..

Leaving Nashville on March 29, the regiment reached the field of Shiloh on Tuesday, April 8, the day after the battle ended. It then participated in the march to and siege of Corinth from April 29 through May 30, and after its evacuation moved with Buell's army through northern Alabama to McMinnville, Tennessee, where, on Saturday, August 30, it overtook Forrest and attacked and routed him.

On September 3, the 17th left McMinnville and marched via Murfreesboro, Nashville, Bowling Green, Elizabethtown, and West Point, to Louisville, Kentucky, arriving there on Thursday, September 25, after marching 270 miles and having a skirmish with Bragg's rear guard on September 21, near Munfordsville. Leaving Louisville on October 1, it moved to Bardstown, where it remained in camp until Saturday, October 18, and then marched to Nashville via Lebanon, Columbia, Glasgow, and Gallatin, reaching there on Wednesday, November 26. It remained there until Sunday, February 1, 1863, and conducted numerous expeditions against regular and irregular raiders in different directions from Nashville.

=== Conversion to mounted infantry ===
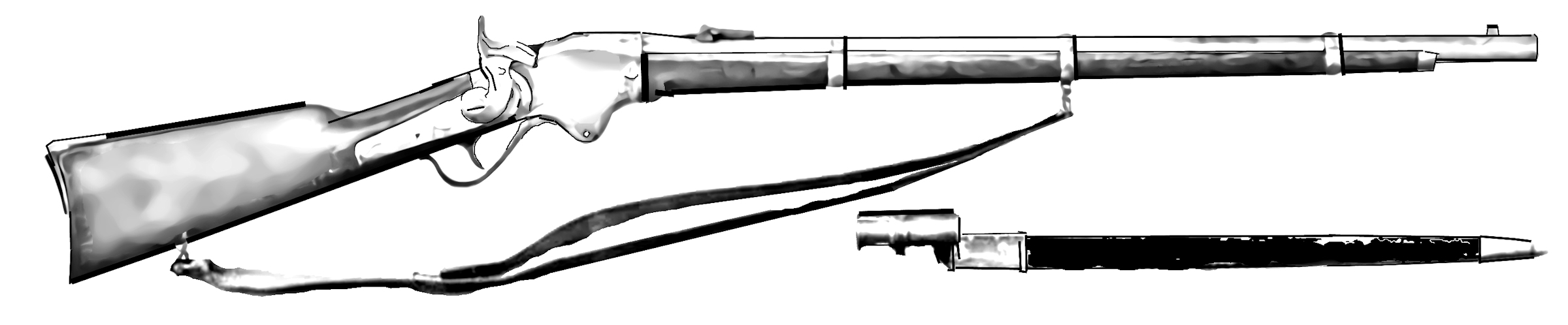
An 1862 Spencer Rifle with sling and bayonet. As part of the "Wilder Lightning Brigade" the 17th was among the first units fighting in the Civil War to receive the Spencer repeating rifle.

In December 1862, the regiments colonel, John T. Wilder was promoted to command of the 2nd Brigade, 5th Division, Center, XIV Corps, Army of the Cumberland (AoC) under Maj. Gen. William S. Rosecrans. (Note: As initially organized, the brigade had the following regiments: the 98th Illinois Infantry:, the 17th, the 72nd Regiment Indiana Infantry, the 75th Indiana Infantry Regiment, and the 18th Independent Battery Indiana Light Artillery, commanded by the famous pharmacist and drug production pioneer, Capt. Eli Lilly. Later, when the 75th Indiana opted out of the conversion to mounted infantry, the 123rd Illinois Volunteer Infantry Regiment exchanged places from its brigade, and after July 10, 1863, Rosecrans reinforced it with a fifth regiment, the 92nd Illinois Mounted Infantry.)

Throughout 1862 and into 1863, the AoC had been plagued by Confederate cavalry and irregulars. Even when the regiment and brigade belonged to Buell's army, U.S. cavalry in that theater was inferior in both numbers and equipment to Rebel cavalry. Due to this, every advance made by Buell was impeded by repeated Confederate cavalry raids in his rear to capture or destroy his supplies and wagon trains and cut off his communication. Since there was insufficient U.S. cavalry to counter them, it became necessary to send infantry in support of our cavalry to drive the rebel cavalry from our rear in order to safeguard the logistics and lines of communications. Like many in the U.S. Army, the 17th were coming to the realization of how hasty and in error the McClellan clique had been in resisting the raising of volunteer cavalry as seen by their own experience as well as McClellan's failure in the Peninsula Campaign. The federal government had already put out a call to the states in the summer of 1862 for cavalry regiments, but they were just recently being raised and were not yet active in sufficient numbers. As the 17th and its brigade were composed mostly of young men, they were invariably called upon to support the cavalry in a chase after the raiders attacking in their rear.

After fruitless attempts to chase down rebel cavalry raiders on foot, Rosecrans began mounting some of his regiments in wagons and later as mounted infantry. At the same time, Wilder who had previously protested his men continually on the run on foot in a vain attempt to catch the Confederate cavalry, volunteered his whole brigade for conversion and also proposed to the arming of his regiments with repeating rifles, promising to take the initiative away from the Rebels.

On Sunday, February 1, the 17th and the brigade moved to Murfreesboro. On Wednesday, February 12, Rosecrans permission was given to mount the brigade. Wilder put the conversion to mounted infantry to the men for vote. The 17th Indiana voted to go ahead with the conversion to mounted infantry. The initial horses offered were of poor quality and the men, supported by their brigadier, refused to accept them. Wilder then proposed to Rosencrans that he be permitted to capture horses from the citizens in the surrounding country. Rosecrans approved and the 17th and its mates periodically raided searching for horses in the Murfreesboro, Lebanon, McMinnvllle, Liberty, and Columbia vicinities in central Tennessee, until enough good horses were secured to furnish mounts for the entire brigade, for which receipts were given to the owners of the horses.

The regiment and the brigade to which it belonged being fully mounted, the next important matter was the arming of the men. At first, Sharp carbines were offered to the brigade, but rejected. Initially interested in Henry rifles, Wilder met an agent from Spencer rifles sent to him by Rosencrans. (Note: Christopher Spencer himself had visited the AoC and the Army of the Potomac over the winter on a sales trip.) Wilder inspected the samples and had them tested by the men, and chose them. Officials of the War Department refused to pay for the guns, but Wilder, determined his men should have them, wrote to his bankers in Indiana, and asked for the loan of sufficient money to pay for the guns, offering to mortgage all his property, but the bankers, feeling a patriotic duty, loaned him the money without security. The arms were purchased by General Wilder and given to his men, who agreed to reimburse him the next payday. On May 18, the regiment and brigade received their Spencer repeating rifles. The 17th and its brigade were now fully mounted and equipped as was no other command at that time in the service.

The new increase in firepower that the Spencer gave, allowed the 17th and its brigade mates to see off numerically superior Confederate infantry and cavalry in several engagements. The weapon was estimated to allow the regiment to deliver five to seven times the firepower of muzzle-loading opponents. This brigade became known as the Lightning Brigade (also sometimes, "The Hatchet Brigade"). (Note: It acquired the names due to the movement speed that was gained by mounting the brigade, and also by the hatchets/tomahawks that Wilder had issued initially. See Lightning Brigade article for more.)

=== Tullahoma campaign ===
After intense training and development of new tactics, the "Lightning Brigade" was ready for service. The mounted infantry proof of concept for the AoC would occur at the Battle of Hoover's Gap.

On June 23, 1863, Rosecrans deployed forces to feign an attack on Shelbyville while massing forces against Braxton Bragg's right. His troops moved out toward Liberty, Bellbuckle, and Hoover's Gaps through the Highland Rim (near Beechgrove, Tennessee). On June 24 in pouring rain that would persist for 17 days (Union soldiers spread the humorous rumor during the campaign that the name Tullahoma was a combination of the Greek words "tulla", meaning "mud", and "homa", meaning "more mud".) Maj. Gen. George H. Thomas's men, spearheaded by Colonel John T. Wilder's "Lightning Brigade", made for Hoover's Gap. }Despite torrential rains, the 17th and its brigade gained the gap so quickly that they surprised and scattered the Confederate 1st (3rd) Kentucky Cavalry Regiment, under Colonel J. Russell Butler at breakfast in front of the entrance of the gap. (Note: This was the regiment originally recruited by Lincoln's brother-in-law, Benjamin H Helm, who would soon fall to mortal wounds at Chickamauga.) After skirmishing briefly and withdrawing under pressure, the rebels were unable to reach the gap before the better-fed horses of the Lightning Brigade. The Kentuckians fell apart as a unit and, unluckily for the Confederates, failed in their cavalry mission to provide intelligence of the Union movement to their higher headquarters. The brigade had shown mounted infantry's value by reaching the gap nearly 9 miles ahead of Thomas's main body. Despite orders from the divisional commander, General Joseph J. Reynolds to fall back to his infantry if he made contact, which was still six miles away, Wilder decided to take and hold the position.

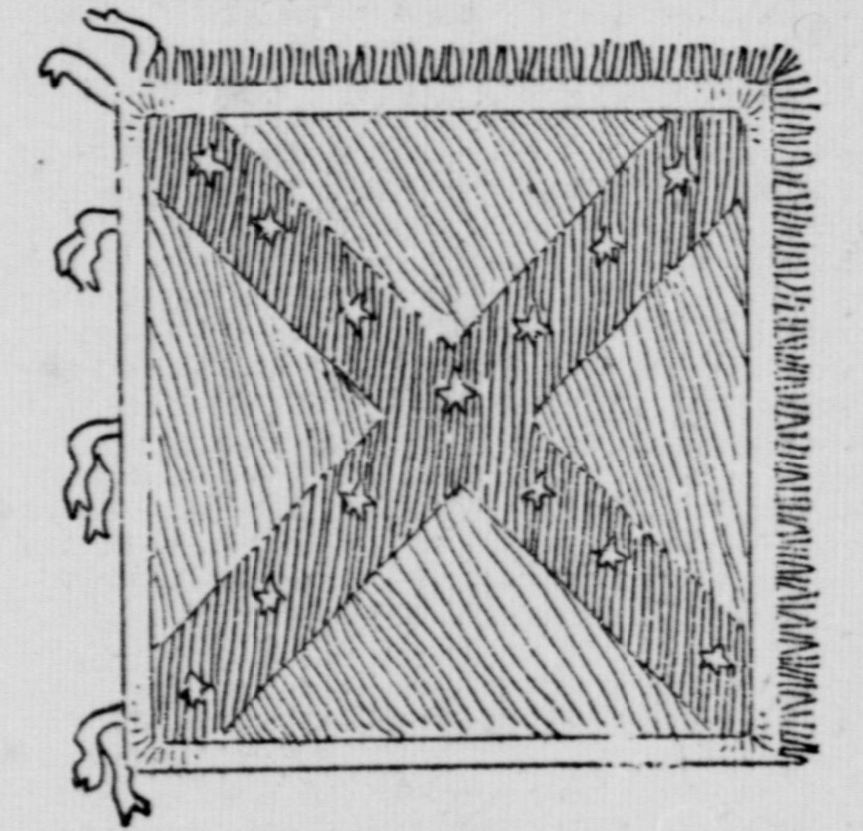
Flag of the 1st Kentucky Cavalry captured by the regiment

The 17th drove the 1st Kentucky through the entire seven-mile length of Hoover's Gap followed by the rest of the brigade. At the other end, they were met at the southeastern exit with artillery fire and found out that the brigade and its one battery were outnumbered four-to-one. The 17th had met Brig. Gen. William B. Bate's brigade of Maj. Gen. Alexander P. Stewart's four-brigade and four-battery division.

Wilder entrenched on the hills south of the gap and determined to hold this extremely advanced position. Bate's brigade, supported by Brig. Gen. Bushrod Johnson's brigade and some artillery, assaulted Wilder's position, but was driven back by the concentrated fire of the Spencers, losing 146 killed and wounded (almost a quarter of his force) to Wilder's 61. The massive superiority of firepower the 17th and its brethren had with the Spencers made Bate initially think he was outnumbered five-to-one.

Colonel James Connolly, commander of the 17th's brigade-mate 123rd Illinois, wrote:

As soon as the enemy opened on us with their artillery we dismounted and formed line of battle on a hill just at the south entrance to the "Gap," and our battery of light artillery was opened on them, a courier was dispatched to the rear to hurry up reinforcements, our horses were sent back some distance out of the way of bursting shells, our regiment was assigned to support the battery, the other three regiments were properly disposed, and not a moment too soon, for these preparations were scarcely completed when the enemy opened on us a terrific fire of shot and shell from five different points, and their masses of infantry, with flags flying, moved out of the woods on our right in splendid style; there were three or four times our number already in sight and still others came pouring out of the woods beyond. Our regiment lay on the hillside in mud and water, the rain pouring down in torrents, while each shell screamed so close to us as to make it seem that the next would tear us to pieces. Presently the enemy got near enough to us to make a charge on our battery, and on they came; our men are on their feet in an instant and a terrible fire from the "Spencers" causes the advancing regiment to reel and its colors fall to the ground, but in an instant their colors are up again and on they come, thinking to reach the battery before our guns can be reloaded, but they "reckoned without their host," they didn't know we had the "Spencers," and their charging yell was answered by another terrible volley, and another and another without cessation, until the poor regiment was literally cut to pieces, and but few men of that 20th Tennessee that attempted the charge will ever charge again. During all the rest of the fight at "Hoover's Gap" they never again attempted to take that battery. After the charge they moved four regiments around to our right and attempted to get in our rear, but they were met by two of our regiments posted in the woods, and in five minutes were driven back in the greatest disorder, with a loss of 250 killed and wounded.

After a long day of combat at 1900, the 17th's morale was uplifted by the arrival of a fresh battery at the gallop, which meant the XIV Corps were close behind. A half-hour later, the Corps' main infantry units arrived to secure the position against any further assaults. The corps commander, General Thomas, shook Wilder's hand and told him, "You have saved the lives of a thousand men by your gallant conduct today. I didn't expect to get to this gap for three days." Rosecrans also arrived on the scene. Rather than reprimand Wilder for disobeying orders, he congratulated him for doing so, telling him it would have cost thousands of lives to take the position if he had abandoned it.

On June 25, Bate and Johnson renewed their attempts to drive the Union men out of Hoover's Gap but failed against the Lightning Brigade now with its parent division and corps. Rosecrans brought the forward movement of the AoC to a halt as the roads had become quagmires and the 17th stayed in its positions.

As the 17th, Lighting Brigade, and the 5th Division held at Hoover's Gap, Bragg soon came to realize the threat of Thomas. Meanwhile, Rosecrans shifted his forces to reinforce Thomas at the gap. Maj. Gen. William J. Hardee, Stewart's immediate superior, ordered his battered troops under Stewart at Hoover's Gap to retreat towards Wartrace. (Note: Hardee and the other corps commanders had already started losing faith in Bragg as a field commander during the winter and spring of 1863.) His retreat served to only make Thomas's breakout more effective, leaving Bragg with his right flank gone. To keep his army together, he had to order Polk and Hardee to withdraw to Tullahoma on June 27.

The 17th had shown the effectiveness of its conversion to mounted infantry and the superior firepower it had gained with its new Spencers. (Note: Before the Spencer Rifle Company called for their pay for the guns, the performance of the Spencers at Hoover's Gap impressed the War Department enough for them to accept and pay for them before the 17th and the brigade had an opportunity to pay for them.) Due to its effectiveness, the 17th and its brigade while maintaining an administrative link to Reynold's division, began to operate independently as a mobile reserve for Rosecrans' army. As such, 17th reached Manchester, TN at 8:00 a.m. on June 27, and the remainder of the division occupied the town by noon.

On June 28, the 17th sortied on a brigade raid to damage the railroad infrastructure in Bragg's rear, heading south toward Decherd, a small town on the Nashville & Chattanooga Railroad. The rain-swollen Elk River proved a significant obstacle, but they disassembled a nearby mill and constructed a raft to float their howitzers across. They defeated a small garrison of Confederates in Decherd, tore up 300 yards of track and burned the railroad depot filled with Confederate rations. The next morning they rode into the foothills of the Cumberland Mountains, reaching the town of Sewanee where they destroyed a branch rail line. Although pursued by a larger Confederate force, the Lightning Brigade was back in Manchester by noon, June 30. They had not lost a single man on their raid.

The actions of the 17th and its cohort unnerved the Rebel corps commanders such that at 3:00 p.m. on June 30, Bragg ordered a nighttime withdrawal across the Elk River before the Rosecrans' expected assault, thereby losing a chance to inflict potentially serious damage on the AoC. Initially positioned below the Elk River, Hardee and Polk felt they should retreat farther south, to the town of Cowan. In turn, their loss of nerve passed to Bragg who deemed Cowan indefensible on July 2. Without consulting his corps commanders, on July 3 Bragg ordered a retreat to Chattanooga. Bragg's army crossed the Tennessee River on July 4 and all its units had encamped near Lookout Mountain by July 7. (Note: A cavalry pursuit under Philip Sheridan failed to catch the Army of Tennessee before it got across the river.)

=== Chickamauga Campaign ===
While the 17th's brigade under Wilder was the only mounted infantry unit of brigade size or larger, several other regiments had converted to mounted infantry. Some had just been mounted while others had also received Spencer rifles, like the 39th Indiana, others had received Henrys, Colt Revolver rifles or Spencer carbines. Rosecrans' use of the brigade, especially after the addition of a fifth regiment, as an independent corps-level, or even army-level, asset increased, frequently received tasking from corps commanders, and even Rosecrans himself.

==== Second Battle of Chattanooga ====
(August 21 – September 8, 1863)

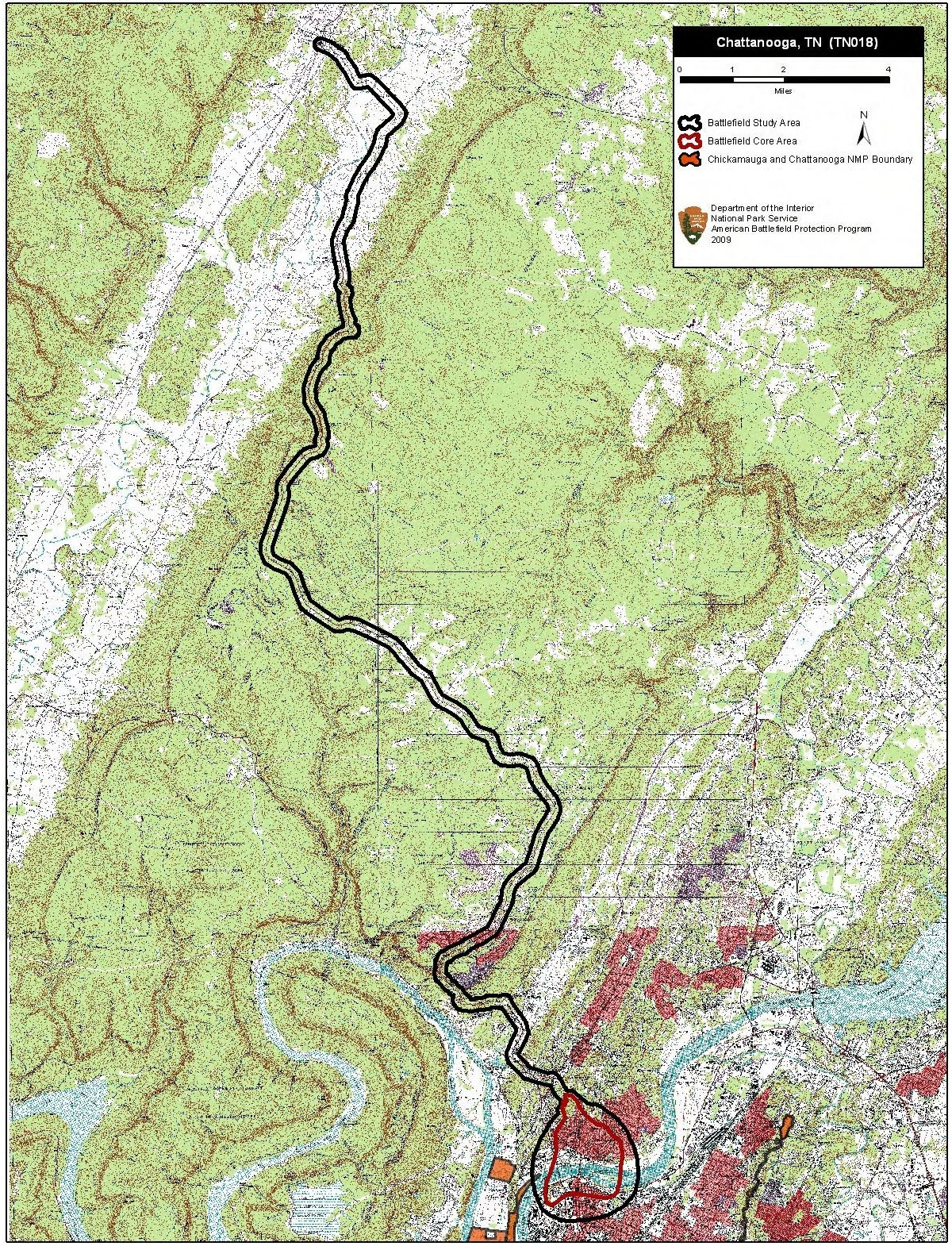
Map of Chattanooga II Battlefield core and study areas by the American Battlefield Protection Program

Having driven Confederate forces from middle Tennessee, the AoC paused to refit and replenish their units. Rosecrans did not immediately pursue Bragg and "give the finishing blow to the rebellion" as Stanton urged, but paused to regroup and study the difficult choices of pursuit into mountainous regions. Rosecrans tried to continue his war of maneuver and get around Bragg's flank to threaten his rear and force him to abandon Chattanooga vice taking it in a pitched battle. He continued using the 17th's brigade as a tool to keep Bragg off-balance.

On August 16, 1863, Rosecrans launched his campaign to take Chattanooga, Tennessee. The 17th (Note: The brigade now had an added regiment the 92nd Illinois Mounted Infantry as of 10 July.) played a crucial role in this campaign. The regiment was a piece of Crittenden's XXI Corps deception operations along the bank north of the Tennessee River across from Chattanooga. The regiment's brigade would sprint ahead and visibly show its presence to the Confederate cavalry screening the south bank while the remainder of Crittenden's force would spread out across the Cumberland Plateau heading north of Chattanooga, while the Rosecrans' other two corps crossed the river below Chattanooga and Bragg. Once the other corps were safely across the river, XXI Corps would fall in behind them leaving the four brigades, including the 17th's, to keep Bragg focused across the river to the north bank. The four brigades would patrol the river, make as much noise as possible, and feigning what Bragg feared most, river crossing operations north of Chattanooga.

The 17th Indiana moved out from its headquarters on 16 August, ascending the Plateau and camping that night at Sewanee, near the University of the South. Its brigade and Minty's cavalrymen led the advance. Those two brigades would move quickly to reach the river while Hazen and Wagner would make their best speed to follow. The 17th and its companions quickly worked their way towards the Tennessee River, through Dunlap, reaching Poe's Tavern, (Note: The tavern, built in 1819, was home to Hamilton County's first courthouse and government seat.) to the northeast of Chattanoogas Ridge on August 20. The steep slopes of the Cumberland Plateau and Walden's Ridge were difficult terrain, and there was a dearth of forage, but the two brigades still made good time in their advance.

At dawn on 21 August, the command moved to the Tennessee to begin their deception. Wilder and Minty divided the north bank between their brigades. The 17th and its brigade mates covered southern side, from city to Sale Creek, and Minty's men from there north to the mouth of the Hiawassee River. Wagner and Hazen's brigades, traveling afoot were still crossing the mountains. Once they arrived, they would join the force already there to keep Bragg distracted.

On arrival, Wilder and Minty divided the north bank between the brigades. The Lightning Brigade would cover from opposite the city to Sale Creek about eleven miles upstream. Minty would cover the sector further upstream. The idea was to keep the Rebels watching to the north and east. Wilder further divided his sector. While the 17th, 123rd Illinois, 72nd Indiana, and two sections of the 18th Indiana Light Artillery (Capt. Eli Lilly's battery),] remained opposite Chattanooga, Wilder sent the 92nd and 98th Illinois with a section of Lilly's Battery ten miles up the Tennessee toward Minty to the ferry at Harrison's Landing.

Rosecrans had ordered the brigade to shell Chattanooga from the north bank of the Tennessee River to divert attention away from the flanking columns sent southwest of the city. Moving cautiously at first, scouts approached the river to appraise the state and location of Confederate forces. The men in the brigade opposite the city found some Confederate soldiers on the north bank, ignorant of the Union force approaching with the 123d Illinois capturing forty prisoners and a ferry. At Harrison's Landing, the 92nd and 98th Illinois found no meaningful forces save a single gun in a small fort on the south bank that was quickly destroyed by the accompanying section of Lilly's Battery.

Next, opposite the city, Wilder brought forward Captain Lilly with his remaining two sections and set them up on high ground about one-half mile from the river. His first targets his artillery attacked were the Dunbar and Paint Rock, two steamers docked at the Chattanooga Wharf. They were quickly sunk. Wilder ordered Lilly to begin shelling the town. The shells caught many soldiers and civilians in town in church observing a day of prayer and fasting. The bombardment created a great deal of consternation amongst the Confederates.

The 17th, 72nd, 123rd, and Lilly's men began shifting positions back and forth to keep the Rebels in the city confused. The 92nd and 98th, after securing the ferry at Harrison's Landing, began trying to keep the Confederates on the opposite bank distracted. When Wagner and Hazen's brigades arrived on August 29, some of Hazen's dismounted infantry joined the 92nd and 98th at Harrison's landing to aid in the misdirection. The deception operation included the 92nd and its compatriots faking boat construction by hammering, sawing, and tossing bits of lumber into the river at Harrison's Landing so that it would float downstream to Chattanooga. The 17th, and its comrades opposite the city, also began a nightly ritual of building numerous campfires to imitate the look of numerous regimental camps. The 17th found that their operation also benefited from the fact that the local population north of the river in Eastern Tennessee on the Cumberland Plateau was strongly Unionist which meant that any Rebels operating there would be quickly reported; in light of this Bragg had no cavalry screen patrolling that could see through the deception.

Continuing periodically over the next two weeks, the shelling and movements within sight of Confederate lookouts on the south bank helped keep Bragg's attention to the northeast while the bulk of Rosecrans's army crossed the Tennessee River well west and south of Chattanooga. The diversion was successful, with Bragg concentrating his army east of Chattanooga. On the morning of September 5, the 17th and U.S. troops were themselves tricked when Bragg's forces faked preparations to cross the river to the north side to attack. They quickly concentrated their forces to contest the crossing, but by the next day, they had figured out that it was a ruse to fix them in one place.

When Bragg learned on September 8 that the Union army was in force southwest of the city, he had already decided to abandon the city (Rosecran's goal) and was planning to withdraw to a more defensible position further south. He sped up his withdrawal and marched his Army of Tennessee into Georgia. Bragg's army marched down the LaFayette Road and camped in the city of LaFayette.

On September 9, the 17th received orders to cross the river at Friar's Island, two miles downstream from Harrison's Landing, and enter Chattanooga. The 17th entered the city that day, but the brigade's crossing and movement into Chattanooga continued to the next day, the 9th and 10th. The 17th and its brigade remained in the city instead of pursuing the enemy because Wilder saw that as a cavalry task and not one for infantry, but reports the men received from locals were passed on which gave Rosecrans the impression that the Army of Tennessee was fleeing in disarray.

==== Skirmish at Ringgold ====
(September 11–12, 1863)

As Rosecrans moved his forces south and west, the terrain soon made mutual support between his three corps nearly impossible. He gradually realized Bragg's Army was not demoralized, nor in disarray, nor defeated. He soon learned from Thomas that the rebels were not falling back but instead seemed to be massing for an imminent attack, and he made plans to shift Thomas' and McCook's corps closer together.

Meanwhile, on Friday, September 11, the 17th, attached once again with its brigade to Crittenden advanced from Lee and Gordon's Mill to Ringgold, GA. There it skirmished with and defeated Col. John S. Scott's brigade of John Pegram's Division of Forrest's Cavalry Corps and then drove off Confederate reinforcements. It returned to the mill by nightfall. The following morning, it was again ordered to advance to Ringgold. Four miles short of the town, it again ran into elements of Pegram's Division. After dispersing these units, Wilder found that Strahl's Brigade of Cheatham's Division of Polk's Corps had cut the brigade's route back to the mill. Although the 17th and its mates were was surrounded, the rebels unsure of its identity, size, and strength, did not press home an attack.

At nightfall, the Wilder deceived the Confederates by spreading campfires over a large area to make the Confederates believe his force was much larger. He formed a defensive perimeter with the 17th, 92nd, 98th, and 123rd Illinois. Then he sent the 72nd Indiana looking for an escape route. After successfully locating an exit, the brigade withdrew back to XXI Corps without the loss of a man. As they rode away at dawn, the men in the 17th heard the rebels attacking their former encampment.

==== Chickamauga ====
(September 19–20, 1863)

==== First encounter ====
Realizing that part of his force had narrowly escaped a Confederate trap, Rosecrans abandoned his plans for a pursuit and began to concentrate his scattered AoC near Stevens Gap. For the next four days, as both armies attempted to improve their dispositions, Rosecrans continued to concentrate his forces, intending to withdraw as a single body to Chattanooga. By September 17, the three Union corps were now much less vulnerable to individual defeat. Reinforced with two divisions arriving from Virginia under Lt. Gen. James Longstreet, and a division from Mississippi under Brig. Gen. Bushrod R. Johnson, Bragg decided to move his army northward on the morning of 18th and advance toward Chattanooga, forcing Rosecrans's army to fight or to withdraw. If Rosecrans fought, he risked being driven back into McLemore's Cove.

While the AoC's cavalry under Minty guarded Reed's Bridge downstream on Chickamauga Creek, the 17th was sent to defend Alexander's Bridge over the waterway on Thursday, 17 September. Wilder drew the 17th, 98th and 123rd Illinois, 72nd Indiana, and Lilly's guns into a defensive line facing south across the creek. The 92nd Illinois detached to protect the army's line of communication back to Chattanooga. The 17th's and brigade's horses were kept several hundred yards behind and slightly up the rise from the bridge.

On Friday, September 18, this force blocked the crossing of W.H.T. Walker's Corps. Armed with Spencer repeating rifles and Capt. Lilly's four guns, these men held off a brigade of Brig. Gen. St. John Liddell's division, inflicting 105 casualties and preventing them from crossing. Walker moved his men downstream a mile to Lambert's Ford, an unguarded crossing, and was able to cross around 4:30 p.m., considerably behind schedule. With bullets now landing among the brigade's mounts in the rear and concerned about his left flank after Minty's loss of Reed's Bridge, Wilder pulled the 17th and its mates to a new blocking position near the Viniard farm. By dark, Bushrod Johnson's division had halted in front of Wilder's position. Walker had crossed the creek, but his troops were well scattered along the road behind Johnson.

===== The first day =====
Although Bragg had achieved some degree of surprise, Rosecrans anticipated Bragg's plan and ordered Thomas and McCook to Crittenden's support. While the 17th was withdrawing from the bridge and the Rebels were crossing the creek, Thomas's men began to arrive in Crittenden's rear area.

Through the morning to midday of Saturday, the 17th was in its position as a reserve near Viniard farm slightly uphill and behind the main line fighting resumed. As the combat progressed, the front developed in a north–south direction just west of Chickamauga Creek. The 174th and the brigade were just behind and to the right of the Union Center held by Maj. Gen. Alexander McDowell McCook's XX Corps.

At around 2:00 p.m., Johnson's division (Hood's corps) forced Union Brig. Gen. Jefferson C. Davis's two brigade division of the XX corps back across the LaFayette Road. Johnson continued to advance with two brigades in line and one in reserve. On the right, Col. John Fulton's brigade routed King's brigade and linked up with Bate at Brotherton field. On the left, Crittenden sent the Lighting Brigade from its reserve position forward to assist Davis.

As the regiment advanced, Wilder saw a column of Brig. Gen. John Fulton's Brigade trying to Flank one of Davis' batteries. He sent the 123rd Illinois (Col. Monroe) and 72nd Indiana (Col. Miller) who promptly broke them and drove them off. Soon, he noticed Brig. Gen. John Gregg's brigade moving through the woods on his left. He quick-marched Miller and Monroe back in line and all four regiments moved forward facing the woods across the fields at the Glenn House. The 17th and its brethren opened an enfilading fire on the left flank of the dense mass of Rebel as they moved out of the woods into the open ground. There, they stopped the Rebels, and drove them back with heavy losses. Gregg was seriously wounded and Johnson's division's advance stopped while Brig. Gen. Evander McNair's brigade, called up from Johnson's rear was also sent packing. After the Confederates withdrew from the woods, the Lightning Brigade returned to its reserve position upslope behind XX Corps.

As the battle continued, Hood's Corps pushed the Union line back north to the Viniard house with elements of the XXI Corps attacked by Hood's corps on the brigade's left. Davis' division was pushed back to the brigade's right where Sheridan's division pushed forward only to be stopped by Hood's onslaught. His units were pushed behind the brigade's line. Hood's Corps advanced so close to Rosecrans's new headquarters at the Glenn Cabin leading to a significant risk of a Federal rout in this part of the line. At this point, once again, Rosecrans sent the 17th's brigade into action to prevent a breakthrough. Reversing their position near the house to face right instead of left, the brigade let Rebels advance so that their right flank was within 150 yards of their own position. The superior firepower from their Spencers enfiladed the right flank and drove the column to seek cover in a drainage ditch that ran parallel to the main battle line, but perpendicular to the 17th's brigade's line. This galling fire was added to by the deadly effectiveness of Lilly's battery raking the ditch with canister. Eventually, they sent the Confederate column into retreat out of range of their Spencers and Lilly's canister.

At 5:00 p.m., the 92nd Illinois, who had been hotly engaged themselves further north, rejoined the brigade and took position on the slope to the left.

===== The second day =====
At dawn, on Sunday, September 20, Rosecrans personally ordered the brigade to take position west across Dry Valley Road on the crest of the east slope of Missionary Ridge at the right end of XX Corps and to report to Maj. Gen. McCook. Starting about 9:30 a.m., the battle resumed primarily to the left (north) of the 17th. The 39th Indiana (Note: Also a Spencer-armed mounted infantry unit.) had been detached from Willich's 1st Brigade from Johnson's Second Division of McCook's XX Corps and was acting as an independent mounted infantry army-level asset. As the fighting began again, Rosecrans ordered them to report to Wilder. When they arrived fifteen minutes later, the 17th was now one of six regiments in a brigade that had approximately 2000 troops armed with Spencer rifles on the line.

By 11:00 a.m., Longstreet had massed a column of 10,000 men to attack the Union center. The attack succeeded aided by a fortuitous, unintended gap left by a rearranged Union line. Longstreet's veterans from the eastern theater, now poured through the breach. As the attack rapidly turned into a Union rout in the center around 1:00 p.m., the 17th and its now five other teammates were ordered to counterattack against Brig. Gen. Arthur Manigault's brigade of Hood's Division from its reserve position. It launched a strong advance with its superior firepower, driving the enemy around and through what became known as "Bloody Pond". The rush of the Lightning Brigade surprised the advancing gray columns. With Lilly's guns and the Indiana and Illinois regiments' Spencers sweeping the field, they stopped the Confederates cold. The melting Rebel formations drew the brigade into counterattack, with Wilder's men routing one enemy regiment, the 34th Alabama, and forcing the 28th Alabama to fall back as well as freezing their division's forward movement. In short order, the 17th and its team had seen off Manigault's brigade, driven back Hood's division, and taken 200 prisoners. The Rebels attacked four more times yet never closed within 50 yards before breaking and fleeing under the heavy firepower. Having blunted the Confederate advance, Wilder planned to capitalize on this success by attacking the flank of Hood's column. His plan was to attack through Hood on Longstreet's left flank and on to Thomas.

The 17th never got to seize this opportunity because Assistant Secretary of War Charles A. Dana, proclaiming the battle lost, demanded Wilder escort him back to Chattanooga. Some controversy exists on whether Dana ordered Wilder to not make the attack, but retreat. In the time that Wilder took to arrange a small detachment to escort him back to safety, the opportunity for a successful attack was lost and he ordered the 17th and its cohort to withdraw to the west.

The 17th remained with its command, cut off on the other side of Dyer Road, south of Thomas's final position on Horseshoe Ridge. At 4:30 p.m., Wilder received the order to retreat to Chattanooga. After nightfall, the brigade mounted and withdrew. As they fell back, they collected the details from the 92nd Illinois and set a screening line across Dyer Road as it passed through the gap from the hill to the mountain with the Vittetoe house in its center. They kept the road open and the rebels at a distance overnight during Thomas' retreat from Snodgrass Hill.

Through the battle, the 17th had performed exceedingly well making good use of their Spencers. It and its brigade mates were one of the few units south of Horseshoe Ridge that did not panic and retreat but successfully attacked. At dawn on Monday, once they realized no more of the troops on Snodgrass Hill would be coming up the road, the 17th Indiana departed the field intact and in good order.

=== Chattanooga and Knoxville campaigns ===
After the battle, the 17th crossed the Tennessee River and camped northeast of Chattanooga resting and screening the left flank of the AoC. During this time, Bragg moved slowly in laying siege to Chattanooga. He did give Wheeler license to attack the AoC's logistics, and the Rebel cavalry destroyed a wagon train in the Sequatchie Valley and harassed pickets and foraging parties sent out from the city. Rosecrans would need to address that threat.

==== Chasing Wheeler ====
Nine days later, Wednesday, September 30, temporarily assigned to the 2nd Cavalry Division, (Note: This assignment would become permanent when the Lightning brigade was broken up and the 98th Illinois and the 17th would be assigned to Col. Eli Long's 2nd Brigade of the Snd Cavalry Division later in November. Rosecrans was continuing his use of the brigade as an independent army asset in an ad hoc manner.) the regiment broke camp and marched 37 miles upriver to Blythe's Ferry. The next day, they received orders to pursue the Rebels under Wheeler, who were in the Sequatchie Valley. Marching over Waldron's Ridge for two days, they arrived at the top of the Cumberland Mountains, overlooking the valley at dusk. Before they could encamp, an order came from General Crook, to move forward with the regiment. Crook told Major Jones moved on and met the Crook, who told him to "drive those rebels out of the cove. There's only a brigade of them." Jones dismounted the regiment, and led it down into Thompson's cove in the darkness. Expecting to run into the Rebels any moment, after some distance, they halted to rest for a minute, when a voice 80 yards in their front called out gruffly, "Who are you?" Jones answered, "Who are you?" The Rebel picket replied, "We're Rebels. Come over."

Jones ordered, "Forward, double quick, charge," and simultaneously with the command, the regiment opened fire with their Spencers. The Rebels, men of Crews' Brigade, (Note: This brigade was Brig. Gen John A. Wharton's Division of Wheeler's corps.) fled in the darkness leaving a few killed and wounded, and a great number of rifles, pistols, etc., on the field. The 17th also captured the colors of the Confederate 2nd Kentucky Cavalry, presented to them by the ladies of Elizabethtown, Kentucky. Having suffered only one man wounded, The regiment lay in line all night after their retreat.

The next day it resumed pursuit, catching and driving more of Wheeler's horsemen out of McMinnville. They pursued until nightfall. The next day they lost contact with the enemy and marched 50 miles over the next 48 hours.

On Monday, October 7, they regained contact with the enemy just beyond Shelbyville where the Rebels were camped on a hill. Jones ordered an attack on the hill. The regiment rode up on horseback, dismounted, and charged. The left wing engaging first, the regiment drove them off the hill leaving behind 30 dead, a number of wounded, and a number of horses that the regiment commandeered.

Jones then rode forward, dismounted, and pursued the Confederates in a continuous skirmish for about 5 miles, when the tired men of the regiment were relieved by the 123rd Illinois. The 123rd immediately opened with their Spencers, advanced, and continued the pursuit on horseback. The 17th mounted and followed immediately.

At Farmington Wheeler had deployed his entire force to make a stand. Upon meeting firm resistance, the 123rd, dismounted and advanced, and Jones dismounted the 17th to support them. The 123rd moved forward on the left side of the road but soon a turn in the road crossed them to the other side. Following them, the 17th's right six companies did the same thing. The other four remained advancing to the left of the road. Wheeler's men kept up a terrible fire from their line behind stone and rail breastworks on the 123rd, and the regiment's right six companies under Major Jones. The left four companies advanced, charged, and broke the enemy's line getting into Farmington in Wheeler's rear.

At this time, the Rebels withdrew their artillery to the opposite edge of town, just as Capt. Vail, with Companies C, K, and G, had reached the public square in the town center. They found themselves within 50 yards of two of Wheeler's guns. Captain Jesse Goad (Note: Goad had assumed command of C Company a week before.) of Company C proposed taking them.

The men opened a rapid fire and shot down the horses and gunners, at the same time running forward and taking the guns. The enemy engaged with the 123rd and the remainder of the 17th, finding their right gone and U.S. forces in their rear, gave away and retreated. Jones came into town double quick, along the main street, to the square, and the regiment moved forward again preventing Wheeler's men from getting the third gun away. The two regiments followed the enemy about one mile from town, skirmishing and taking many prisoners. The guns captured were two 12-pounder howitzers and one rifled gun. We also captured a great number of arms, several wagons laden with supplies, and about 300 prisoners. The enemy's loss must have been very heavy; not less than 500 killed and wounded in the day's fight. The regiment lost 48 killed and wounded.

Once again, the increased firepower that the Spencer rifles gave the regiment allowed it to attack and defeat a larger foe. The rapid fire proved extremely effective in the center of Farmington when they caught Wheeler's artillery before they could react.

The regiment regrouped with the 98th Illinois in Huntsville, AL until 13 October, when it started in pursuit of enemy cavalry again. From October 13–27, the regiment continued to operate as part of the 2nd brigade pursuing Forrest's, Roddy's, and Wharton's cavalry operating downriver southwest near Huntsville, AL and north of that to south central Tennessee. Averaging 25 miles marching a day, the brigade was never able to catch up with the Rebel horsemen, but the near-constant pursuit effectively screened Maj. Gen. William T. Sherman's force advancing along the Memphis & Charleston Railroad as well as the AoC's logistic lines.

Even before the Union defeat, Maj. Gen. Ulysses S. Grant had been ordered to send his available force to assist Rosecrans, and it had departed under Sherman from Vicksburg, Mississippi. Behind the scenes, Rosecrans fell victim to false reports of his actions during Chickamauga and the AoC's status in Chattanooga. Secretary of War Stanton began urging Lincoln to sack Rosecrans. Getting assent, on September 29, Stanton had ordered Grant to go to Chattanooga himself via Louisville where he met Stanton and received command of the newly created Military Division of the Mississippi, bringing territory from the Appalachian Mountains to the Mississippi River under a unified command. On October 18 en route, he had replaced Rosecrans with Thomas to command of the Army of the Cumberland. Grant arrived in Chattanooga on October 23.

On Tuesday, October 27, the regiment was in Maysville and began building winter quarters.

==== The Battle of Chattanooga ====
They remained there until Wednesday, November 18. That day, the 17th received orders for 250 of the best mounted men of the regiment (25 from each company) to march to Chattanooga. Four days later, they arrived to protect the left flank of the U.S. forces east of the city. On Monday evening, 23 November, the regiment crossed the Tennessee River on Sherman's pontoon bridge to the south side and moved out on the road northeast towards Cleveland. During the lifting of the siege on Tuesday, the regiment operated behind Bragg's army and destroyed Rebel wagon trains and stores at Tyner's Station. Moving further south, they destroyed another wagon train. After destroying a total of 77 wagons that day, it returned to the Tennessee riverbank having covered 25 miles.

On Thursday, they advanced and camped at Cleveland, where on Friday, 27 November, they destroyed the foundry in town. They had begun departing when Kelly's Brigade attacked them, and sharp skirmishing began. Outnumbered, losing one man killed, the 17th fell back to Silico Creek outside the city.

== Affiliations, battle honors, detailed service, and casualties ==
=== Organizational affiliation ===
Its assignments are as follows:

- 15th Brigade, Army of the Ohio (AoO), to January 1862.
- 15th Brigade, 4th Division, AoO, January 1862.
- 15th Brigade, 6th Division, AoO, to September 1862.
- 15th Brigade, 6th Division, II Corps, AoO, to November 1862.
- 1st Brigade, 1st Division, Left Wing, XIV Corps, Army of the Cumberland (AoC), to December, 1862.
- 2nd Brigade, 5th Division (Center), XIV Corps, AoC, to January 1863.
- 2nd Brigade, 5th Division, XIV Corps, AoC, to June 1863.
- 1st Brigade, 4th Division, XIV Corps, AoC, to October 1863.
- Wilder's Mounted Brigade, AoC, to November, 1863.
- 2nd Brigade, 2nd Cavalry Division, AoC, November 1863.
- 3rd Brigade, 2nd Cavalry Division, AoC, to October 1864.
- 1st Brigade, 2nd Division, Wilson's Cavalry Corps, Military Division Mississippi, to August, 1865.

=== List of battles ===
The official list of battles in which the regiment bore a part:

- Battle of Greenbrier River
- Siege of Corinth
- Tullahoma Campaign
  - Battle of Hoover's Gap
- Battle of Chickamauga
- Atlanta campaign
  - Battle of Rome Cross Roads
  - Battle of Kennesaw Mountain
  - Battle of Marietta
  - Battle of New Hope Church
  - Battle of Ebenezer Church
- Battle of Selma
- Battle of Columbus

=== Detailed service ===
==== 1861 ====
- Organized at Indianapolis, IN, and mustered into Federal service June 12, 1861.
- Left State for Parkersburg, WV, July 1.
- Moved to Oakland, WV, July 23, 1861
- Thence to Camp Pendleton and duty there till August 7.
- Moved to Cheat Mountain Pass and Elkwater August 7–13.
- Operations on Cheat Mountain September 11–17.
- Elkwater September 11.
- Point Mountain Turnpike September 11–12.
- Cheat Mountain Pass September 12.
- Elkwater September 14.
- Action at Greenbrier River October 3–4.
- Moved to Louisville, KY, November 19 and duty there till December 10.
- At Camp Wickliffe, KY, till February 10, 1862.

==== 1862 ====
- Advance on Bowling Green, KY, and Nashville, TN, February 10-March 12.
- March to Savannah, TN, March 29 – April 7.
- Lawrenceburg April 4.
- Arrive at Pittsburg Landing April 7.
- Advance on and Siege of Corinth, MS, April 29 – May 30.
- Pursuit to Booneville, MS May 31 – June 6.
- Buell's Campaign in Northern Alabama and Middle Tennessee June to August.
- Little Pond, near McMinnville, TN, August 30.
- March to Louisville, KY, in pursuit of Bragg September 3–26.
- Siege of Munfordsville, KY, September 16–21. A detachment of recruits en route to join the regiment captured September 21.
- Moved to Bardstown, KY October 1 and duty there till October 18.
- March to Nashville, TN, via Lebanon, Columbia, Glasgow, KY, and Gallatin, TN, October 18 –November 26.
- Duty at Nashville till February 1, 1863.

==== 1863 ====
- Moved to Murfreesboro, TN, February l and duty there till June.
- Expedition to Auburn, Liberty and Alexandria February 3–8.
- Regiment mounted February 12, and assigned to duty as Mounted Infantry.
- Expedition to Woodbury March 3–8.
- Action at Woodbury March 6.
- Expedition to Liberty, Carthage and Lebanon April 1–8.
- Expedition to McMinnville April 20–30.
- Armed with Spencer Carbines May 18.
- Middle Tennessee (or Tullahoma) Campaign June 23-July 7.
- Hoover's Gap June 24.
- Battle of Hoover's Gap June 24–26.
- Occupation of Manchester June 27.
- Raid on Bragg's communications July 1 – August 16.
- Captured depot of supplies at Dechard.
- Passage on the Cumberland Mountains and Tennessee River and Chickamauga Campaign August 16 – September 22.
- Capture of Chattanooga September 9.
- Ringgold, GA, September 11.
- Lee and Gordon's Mills September 12.
- Leet's Tan Yard September 12–13.
- Alexander's Bridge and Hall's House September 18.
- Vinyard's House September 19.
- Battle of Chickamauga September 19–21.
- Widow Glen's House September 20.
- Operations against Wheeler and Roddy September 9 – October 17.
- Thompson's Cove, near Beersheba October 3.
- Glass Cocks October 4.
- Murfreesboro Road. near McMinnville, October 4.
- Farmington October 7.
- Sim's Farm, near Shelbyville, October 7.
- Shelbyville October 10.
- Expedition from Maysville to Whitesburg and Decatur November 14–17.
- Chattanooga-Ringgold Campaign November 23–27.
- Raid on East Tennessee & Georgia R. R. November 24·27.
- Charleston and Cleveland November 26.
- March to relief of Knoxville, TN, November 28 – December 8.
- Duty at Pulaski, Charleston and Nashville, TN, till May 1864.

==== 1864 ====
- Regiment re-enlisted January 4, 1864.
- Veterans on furlough January 22 to April 2.
- Atlanta Campaign May 1 to September 8.
- Joined Sherman May 10.
- Battle of Resaca May 14–15.
- Battle of Rome Cross Roads May 16–17
- Movements on Dallas May 18–25.
- Near Dallas May 24.
- Operations on line of Pumpkin Vine Creek and battles about Dallas, New Hope Church and Allatoona Hills May 25 – June 5.
- Big Shanty June 9.
- Operations about Marietta and against Kenesaw Mountain June 10 – July 2.
- Noonday Creek June 19.
- Powder Springs June 20–27.
- Rottenwood Creek July 4.
- Chattahoochie River July 5–17.
- Covington July 22.
- Siege of Atlanta July 22 – August 25.
- Garrard's Raid to South River July 27–31.
- Flat Rock Bridge July 28.
- Lovejoy Station July 29–30.
- Newnan's July 30.
- Operations at Chattahoochie River Bridge August 26-September 2.
- Operations against Hood in North Georgia and North Alabama September 29 – November 1.
- Near Lost Mountain October 4–7.
- New Hope Church October 5.
- Dallas October 7.
- Rome October 10–11.
- Narrows October 11.
- Coosaville Road, near Rome, October 13.
- Near Summerville October 18.
- Little River October 20.
- Leesburg and Grove Road Crossing, AL, October 21.
- Goshen October 28.
- Dismounted November 1 and ordered to Louisville, KY Duty there till December 28.

==== 1865 ====
- Moved to Nashville, TN, thence to Gravelly Springs, AL, and duty there till March 1865.
- Wilson's Raid to Macon, GA, March 22 – April 24.
- Battle of Ebenezer Church, Plantersville, AL, April 1
- Battle of Selma, AL April 2.
- Montgomery, AL April 12.
- Battle of Columbus, GA April 16.
- Spring Hill, Mimm's Mills, Tobesofkee Creek, Montpelier Springs and Rocky Creek Bridge, near Macon, April 20.
- Capture of Macon, GA April 20.
- Post duty at Macon till August.
- Mustered out August 8, 1865.

=== Casualties and total strength ===
The 17th Indiana's original strength was 1,063. Through its time in service, it gained 960 recruits and reenlisted, 288; total, 2,311. The regiment lost 3 officers and 90 enlisted men killed and mortally wounded from combat. It also lost 1 officer and 143 enlisted men to various diseases. The total loss by death was 237 men. It further Lost 161 to desertion and mustered out with 82 missing.

== Armament ==
The 17th Indiana was an 1861 three-year regiment that greatly increased the number of men under arms in the federal army. As with many of these volunteers, initially, there were not enough muzzle-loading rifled muskets in Indiana's stores to arm the regiment. At its genesis, Companies B and F were armed with imported British Pattern 1853 Enfield rifles. These were the standard rifle for the British army having performed well in the Crimean War. The Enfield was a .577 calibre Minié-type that could also fire the standard U.S. .58 Minié ammunition as well. Companies C, D, E, G, H, I, and K, were armed with percussion smoothbore .69 calibre Model 1842 Muskets. (Note: Indiana also had stocks of Springfield Model 1816s, Model 1822s, Model 1835s, and Model 1840s in their armories that had been converted to percussion but there is no indication they were issued to the 17th.). Company A was armed with a battery of two iron 6-pounder smoothbore cannons. A scout company was organized of fifty select men from the companies of the regiment to operate on an ad hoc basis. They were also armed with imported Pattern 1853 Enfield rifles, and were commanded by Lieut. Green F. Shields, of Company K. (Note: These Springfields were either National Armory (NA) or contact manufactured. In government records, National Armory refers to one of three United States Armory and Arsenals, the Springfield Armory, the Harpers Ferry Armory, and the Rock Island Arsenal. Rifle-muskets, muskets, and rifles were manufactured in Springfield and Harper's Ferry before the war. When the Rebels destroyed the Harpers Ferry Armory early in the American Civil War and stole the machinery for the Confederate central government-run Richmond Armory, the Springfield Armory was briefly the only government manufacturer of arms, until the Rock Island Arsenal was established in 1862. During this time production ramped up to unprecedented levels ever seen in American manufacturing up until that time, with only 9,601 rifles manufactured in 1860, rising to a peak of 276,200 by 1864. Any arms manufacturer awarded a contract had to follow strict guidelines to ensure interoperability between parts for both NA and commercially produced Springfields. awarded These advancements would not only give the Union a decisive technological advantage over the Confederacy during the war but served as a precursor to the mass production manufacturing that contributed to the post-war Second Industrial Revolution and 20th-century machine manufacturing capabilities. American historian Merritt Roe Smith has drawn comparisons between the early assembly machining of the Springfield rifles and the later production of the Ford Model T, with the latter having considerably more parts, but producing a similar number of units in the earliest years of the 1913–1915 automobile assembly line, indirectly due to mass production manufacturing advancements pioneered by the armory 50 years earlier.)

By the end of the 1st quarter of 1863, after roughly fifteen months of service, the weapons were distributed as follows in the ordnance survey reported in March 1863. Survey for First Quarter, 31 March 1863

- A — Surveyed November 28, 1862, Brownsboro AL - 79 Springfield Rifled Muskets, model 1855, 1861, NA and contract, (.58 Cal.)
- B — Surveyed June 24, 1862, Murfreesboro TN - 49 Springfield Rifled Muskets, model 1855, 1861, NA and contract, (.58 Cal.)
- C — Surveyed July 24, 1862, Murfreesboro TN - 41 Springfield Rifled Muskets, model 1855, 1861, NA and contract, (.58 Cal.); 5 P53 Enfield Rifled Muskets (.58 and .577 Cal.)
- D — Surveyed June 24, 1862, Murfreesboro TN- 42 P53 Enfield Rifled Muskets (.58 and .577 Cal.)
- E — Surveyed June 29, 1862, Murfreesboro TN - 38 Springfield Rifled Muskets, model 1855, 1861, NA and contract, (.58 Cal.); 2 P53 Enfield Rifled Muskets (.58 and .577 Cal.)
- F — Surveyed September 3, 1862, Murfreesboro TN - 50 P53 Enfield Rifled Muskets (.58 and .577 Cal.)
- G — Surveyed November 17, 1862, Murfreesboro TN - 24 Springfield Rifled Muskets, model 1855, 1861, NA and contract, (.58 Cal.); 2 P53 Enfield Rifled Muskets (.58 and .577 Cal.)
- H — Surveyed June 24, 1862, Murfreesboro TN - 68 Springfield Rifled Muskets, model 1855, 1861, NA and contract, (.58 Cal.)
- I — Surveyed June 24, 1862, Murfreesboro TN - 41 Springfield Rifled Muskets, model 1855, 1861, NA and contract, (.58 Cal.); 17 P53 Enfield Rifled Muskets (.58 and .577 Cal.)
- K — Surveyed November 15, 1862, Murfreesboro TN - 51 Springfield Rifled Muskets, model 1855, 1861, NA and contract, (.58 Cal.); 2 P53 Enfield Rifled Muskets (.58 and .577 Cal.)

As stated earlier, on May 18, 1863, the regiment was re-armed with Spencer repeating rifles. Department of War Ordnance Department resistance was based on the theory that soldiers would waste ammunition by firing too rapidly with repeating rifles requiring a vastly expanded logistics train to provide enough ammunition for the soldiers in the field, as they already had grave difficulty bringing up enough ammunition to sustain armies of tens of thousands of men over distances of hundreds of miles. The Spencer's unit cost (several times that of a Springfield Model 1861 rifled musket) also stood in the way. It was only after the action at Hoover's Gap that this resistance began to fade.

The Spencer showed itself to be very reliable under combat conditions, with a sustainable rate-of-fire in excess of 20 rounds per minute. Compared to standard muzzle-loaders, with a rate of fire of 2–3 rounds per minute, this represented a significant tactical advantage, yet it would take the brigade a while to develop tactics to match this. Similarly, the supply chain needed to expand to transport the extra ammunition. Detractors complained that the higher rate of fire produced more smoke such that it was hard to see the enemy, which was not surprising since even the smoke produced by muzzleloaders would quickly blind whole regiments, and even divisions as if they were standing in thick fog, especially on still days. One of the noted advantages of the Spencer was that its ammunition was waterproof and hardy, and could stand the constant jostling of long storage on the march, such as Wilson's Raid. The story goes that every round of paper and linen Sharps ammunition carried in the supply wagons was found useless after long storage in supply wagons. Spencer ammunition had no such problem owing to the new technology of metallic cartridges.

Of note, by the 4th Quarter of 1864, roughly eighteen months after getting the Spencer rifle, some Spencer carbines had been issued to replace rifles that needed repair as seen in the two ordnance surveys reported in January 1964 and January 1865.

Survey for Fourth Quarter, 31 December 1863

- A — Surveyed December 18, 1863, Columbia TN - 53 Spencer Rifles (.52 Cal.); 1 Springfield Model 1861 Rifled Musket
- B — Surveyed December 6, 1863, Stevenson AL - 55 Spencer Rifles (.52 Cal.)
- C — Surveyed November 28, 1863, Maysville, AL - 65 Spencer Rifles (.52 Cal.)
- D — Surveyed August 25, 1863, Columbia TN - 64 Spencer Rifles (.52 Cal.)
- E — Surveyed January 15, 1864, Pulaski, TN - 58 Spencer Rifles (.52 Cal.)
- F — Surveyed August 10, 1863, Columbia TN - 49 Spencer Rifles (.52 Cal.)
- G — Surveyed August 11, 1863, Columbia TN - 45 Spencer Rifles (.52 Cal.)
- H — Surveyed November 25, 1863, Maysville, AL - 40 Spencer Rifles (.52 Cal.)
- I — Surveyed November 25, 1863, Chattanooga, TN - 50 Spencer Rifles (.52 Cal.)
- K — Surveyed November 20, 1863, Chattanooga, TN - 60 Spencer Rifles (.52 Cal.)

Survey for Fourth Quarter, 31 December 1864

- A — Surveyed December 2, 1864, Louisville, KY - 41 Spencer Rifles (.52 Cal.); 16 Spencer Carbines (.52 Cal.); 1 Springfield Model 1861 Rifled Musket (.58 Cal.)
- B — Surveyed November 30, 1864, Blakes Mill GA - 42 Spencer Rifles (.52 Cal.); 5 Spencer Carbines (.52 Cal.)
- C — Surveyed December 7, 1864, Blakes Mill GA - 55 Spencer Rifles (.52 Cal.); 10 Spencer Carbines (.52 Cal.)
- D — Surveyed January 15, 1865, Louisville, KY - 35 Spencer Rifles (.52 Cal.); 25 Spencer Carbines (.52 Cal.)
- E — Surveyed October 22, 1864, Blakes Mill GA - 67 Spencer Rifles (.52 Cal.); 7 Spencer Carbines (.52 Cal.)
- F — Surveyed December 5, 1864, Blakes Mill GA - 28 Spencer Rifles (.52 Cal.); 24 Spencer Carbines (.52 Cal.)
- G — Surveyed December 17, 1864, Louisville, KY - 24 Spencer Rifles (.52 Cal.); 18 Spencer Carbines (.52 Cal.)
- H — Surveyed November 23, 1864, Blakes Mill GA - 34 Spencer Rifles (.52 Cal.); 38 Spencer Carbines (.52 Cal.)
- I — Surveyed December 19, 1864, Blakes Mill GA - 33 Spencer Rifles (.52 Cal.); 3 Spencer Carbines (.52 Cal.)
- K — Surveyed December 19, 1864, Blakes Mill GA - 22 Spencer Rifles (.52 Cal.); 40 Spencer Carbines (.52 Cal.)
- Quartermasters — Surveyed December 7, 1864, Blakes Mill GA - 12 Spencer Carbines (.52 Cal.)

=== Issued weapons ===
Issued weapons

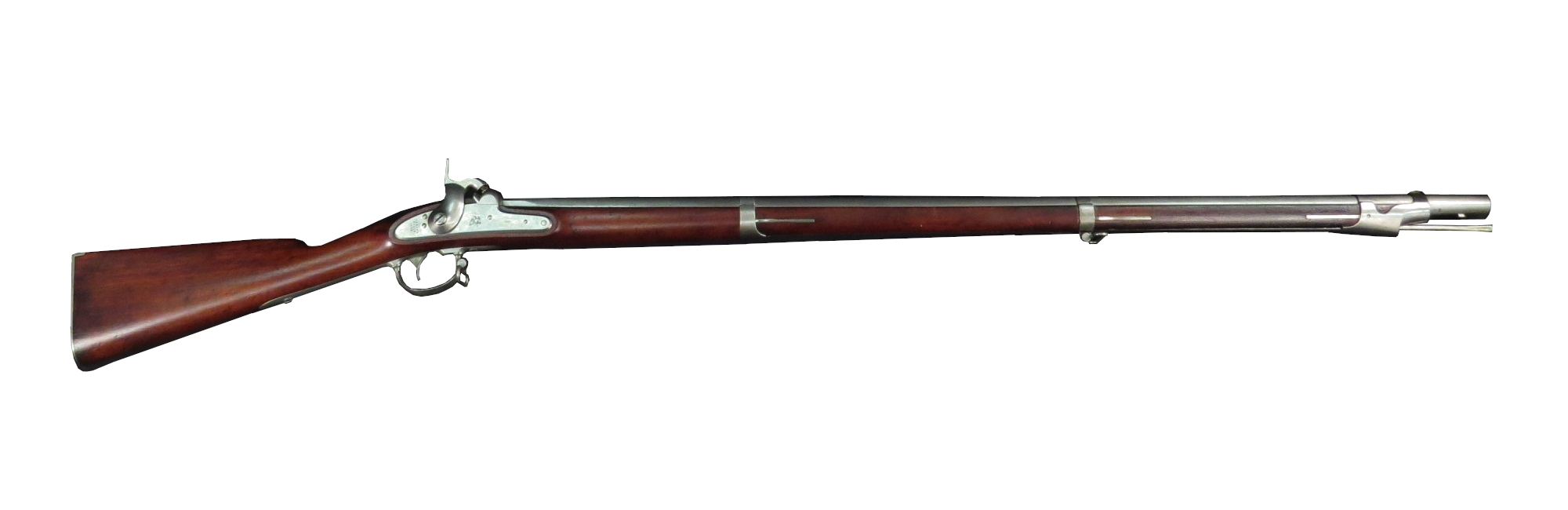
Springfield Model 1842, issued weapon

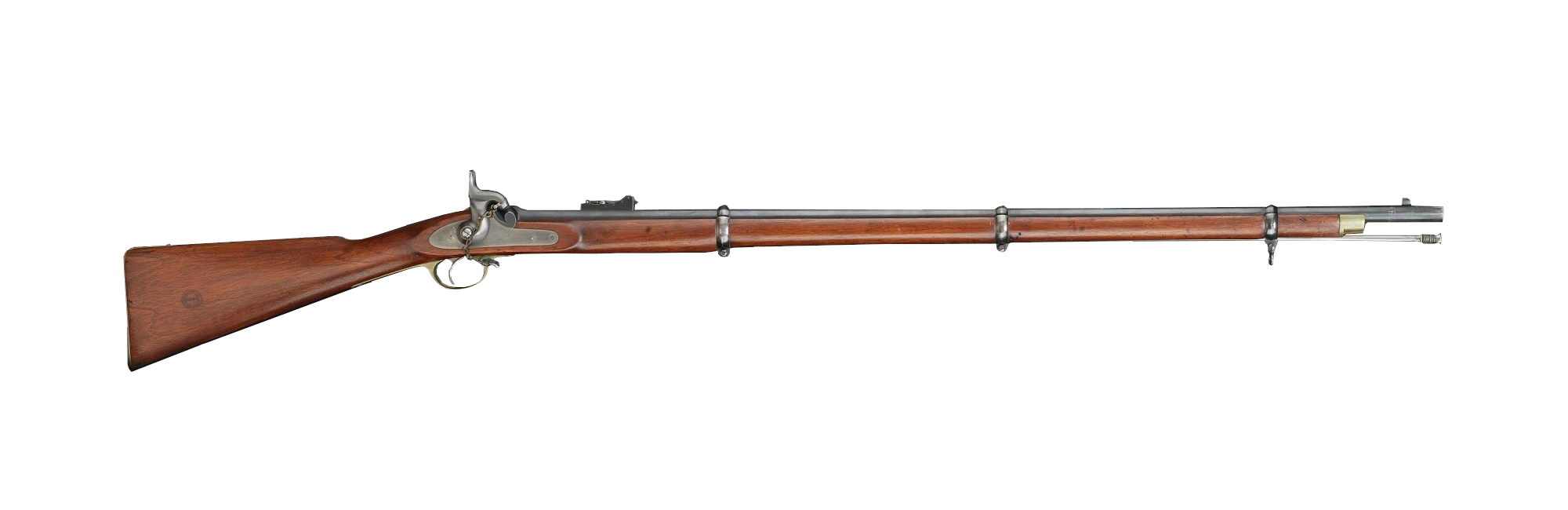
1853 Enfield rifle-musket, issued weapon

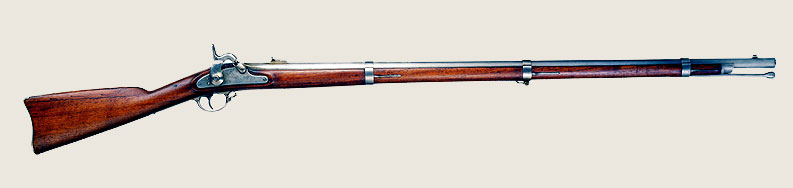
Springfield Model 1861, issued weapon

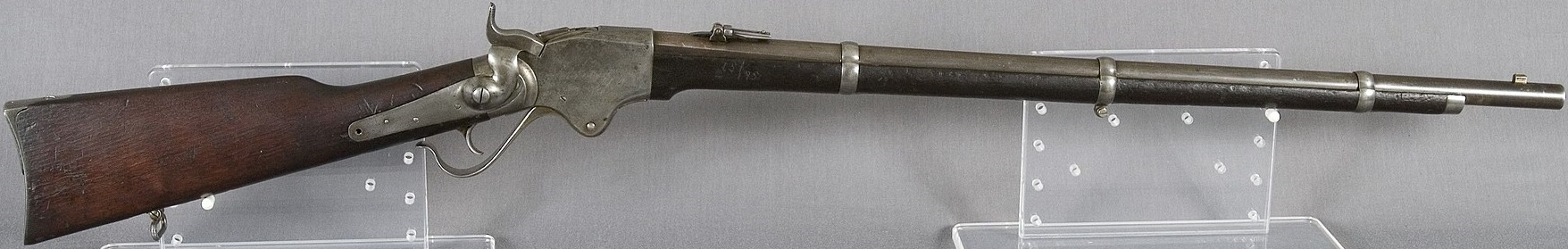
Spencer Rifle, issued weapon

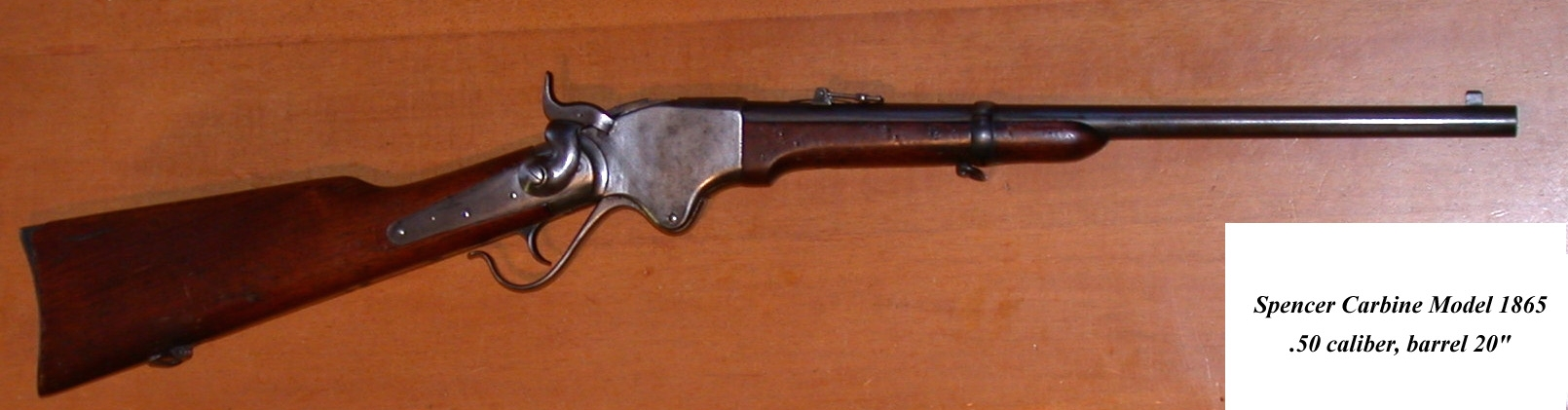
Spencer seven-shot carbine, issued weapon

== Notable members ==
- Mordecai Davidson (1845–1940), professional baseball owner and manager
- John Davis (1838–1901), Medal of Honor recipient
- Milo Smith Hascall (1829–1904), Brigadier General
- Jacob G. Vail (1827–1884), brevet Brigadier General
- John T. Wilder (1830–1917), brevet Brigadier General
- William Theopilus Jones (1842–1882), Major.

== See also ==
- List of Indiana Civil War regiments
- Indiana in the Civil War
