= 6th Michigan Infantry Regiment =

Union infantry regiment from the American Civil War

- Michigan state flag
- Active: August 20, 1861, to July 1863
- Country: United States
- Allegiance: Union
- Branch: Infantry
- Engagements: Battle of Baton Rouge; Siege of Port Hudson

The 6th Michigan Infantry Regiment was an infantry regiment that served in the Union Army during the American Civil War. The unit fought at Baton Rouge and Port Hudson before being converted into the 6th Michigan Heavy Artillery in July 1863.

== Service ==
The regiment recruited across southern Michigan between April and August 1861. Governor Austin Blair appointed Kalamazoo resident Frederick W. Curtenius as colonel. Curtenius, in turn, selected Thomas Scott Clark and Edward Savage Bacon as lieutenant colonel and major, respectively. On June 19 the regiment's officers (commissioned and noncommissioned) assembled at Fort Wayne, near Detroit, for training under regular army officers—most notably Alpheus Starkey Williams—as part of Michigan's Camp of Instruction. Upon completion of that initial training, the full regiment assembled at Kalamazoo in mid-August and was deployed out of state, bound for Baltimore, at the end of the month.

Despite pronounced secessionist sentiment in Baltimore, the regiment's stay there was mostly pleasant and uneventful. Major Bacon led the regiment on a bloodless foray down Virginia's Eastern Shore in December as part of Brigadier General Henry Hayes Lockwood’s Peninsular Brigade. This expedition exposed the first cracks in the 6th Michigan’s discipline as the soldiers foraged liberally and harbored escaped slaves against orders. The Michiganders went so far as to openly taunt General Lockwood after he confronted the entire regiment in an attempt to apprehend a soldier who had stolen a turkey from a local farmer.

In February 1862 the 6th Regiment deployed for Ship Island, off the coast of Mississippi, where they were brigaded with the 21st Indiana Infantry and the 4th Wisconsin Infantry under Brigadier General Thomas Williams. The Michiganders participated in the successful New Orleans campaign, again without bloodshed. The unit disembarked in the Crescent City at the beginning of May, quartered briefly in the New Orleans Mint amid a hostile population, and resumed their trek up the Mississippi River soon after.

Curtenius’s troops waded through a cypress swamp overnight and severed the New Orleans, Jackson, and Great Northern Railroad near Frenier Station in conjunction with the 4th Wisconsin. Proceeding upriver, they sickened shipboard amid logistical shortages and sweltering heat during an abortive move against Vicksburg, and withdrew to quarter at Baton Rouge. The regiment’s transports were fired upon en route at Grand Gulf, Mississippi, with the loss of one man killed and one wounded. They and the Wisconsin troops disembarked and sacked that town in retaliation.

The Michiganders’ discipline continued to erode. They had bristled under regular army discipline ever since Ship Island, taunting and defying General Williams at every opportunity—just as they had done with General Lockwood. This clash culminated with Colonel Curtenius's refusal to expel escaped slaves from camp, citing the Act Prohibiting the Return of Slaves. Williams retaliated by arresting Curtenius briefly and turning the regiment out of its comfortable quarters at the Pentagon Barracks for several days, exposing the already sick soldiers to debilitating rains, heat, and humidity. Nearly half the regiment was hospitalized, and men were dying daily.

Throughout it all, the unit was engaged in and around Baton Rouge in the profiteering and plundering rampant throughout Benjamin Butler’s Department of the Gulf. Plantations were emptied of cotton and slaves, and some plantation buildings were burned to the ground. Cotton was shipped and sold under mysterious circumstances, to the financial benefit of men ranging from company officers all the way to the highest echelons of the military department.

After Curtenius resigned due to illness, leaving Thomas S. Clark in command of the regiment, Williams again expelled the disobedient regiment from its quarters. The unit's four ranking officers refused to order the unit to move. They were arrested and sent to New Orleans, leaving the regiment bereft of field officers and under the command of its fourth ranking captain, Charles Edward Clarke, on the eve of the unit's first general engagement.

For all its disciplinary woes, the sickly 6th Michigan fought tenaciously at the Battle of Baton Rouge on August 5, 1862. John C. Breckinridge assaulted Williams's brigade—which Williams declined to fortify, and scattered around the edges of town—with two divisions. Many sick Michiganders snuck out of their hospital beds to join the fight. Williams, desperate to bolster the center of his line, divided the already thin ranks of the 6th Michigan into two shorthanded battalions. One battalion, under abolitionist Captain Chauncey Bassett, fended off an entire Confederate brigade at Magnolia Cemetery long enough to keep the Union center intact. Captain Harrison Soule's Company I, with just 44 men and officers, stymied a flanking movement by the 6th Kentucky Infantry, buying critical time for artillery to engage. Soule and his company paid the steep price of nearly 60% casualties.

On the Union right, the 6th Michigan's other battalion was reduced by picket detachments to just three companies totaling about 130 men under Captain John Corden. Yet they routed the entire Confederate brigade of Henry Watkins Allen with the help of one section of guns detached from the 21st Indiana, saving the Union right flank. Corden's men, still grossly outnumbered, counterattacked in a bold bayonet charge, capturing the colors of the 9th Louisiana Battalion. The 6th Michigan's entire loss in the battle amounted to 19 killed, 40 wounded, and 6 missing, or about 17 percent of the force engaged. General Williams was shot dead toward the end of the battle. Despite all the former animosity, he and the Michiganders had been mutually impressed with each other's bravery under fire.

General Butler, spooked by the near loss of an irreplaceable brigade, reeled in his department's troops to bar the approaches to New Orleans. The 6th Michigan guarded Metairie Ridge and suffered severely from disease in a swampy setting. In October alone, 22 men died and 73 were discharged. November saw only a modest improvement, and as of December 6, the regiment, which had departed Michigan fifteen months prior with 996 men and officers, now reported a mere 191 men present for duty.

The regiment quartered in a cotton press in New Orleans and recovered sufficiently by January 1863 to join Godfrey Weitzel’s operation to capture or destroy the troublesome, partially ironclad Confederate gunboat J.A. Cotton. After some light skirmishing, the Rebels torched Cotton to prevent her capture. Weitzel let his troops loose on the march home, and foraging soon evolved into outright pillaging, including the burning of five plantation homes.

After guarding New Orleans again until March, the regiment was ordered in conjunction with fragments of other commands to destroy railroad bridges north of Ponchatoula, Louisiana, as a feint in support of a larger advance by Butler's successor, Nathaniel P. Banks. The Federals brushed aside modest resistance from Mississippi troops (20th Mississippi), and burned two railroad bridges north of town. Ponchatoula itself was sacked after an unsuccessful guerrilla attack enraged the Federals. Confederate reinforcements (1st Choctaw Battalion, 1st Mississippi Cavalry, 14th Mississippi Infantry) arrived the next morning, and Clark's expedition was driven all the way back to Pass Manchac, where they constructed Fort Stevens.

On April 7, 1863, Clark led a handful of men on a raid aboard the partially ironclad USS Barataria. The ship ran aground at the mouth of the Amite River and had to be abandoned and destroyed under pressure from a small force of Confederate cavalry. Five days later, ten Michiganders set off in small boats to pursue a Rebel ship that salvaged one gun from the Barataria’s wreck. Clark's men stumbled into an ambush, and all but one were captured.

The Barataria triggered the climax of bitter disputes between the 6th Michigan's ranking officers, Thomas Clark and Edward Bacon. Clark's persistent involvement in profiteering and plundering enraged Bacon, whose difficulties in accepting military subordination triggered incessant conflicts with his superiors. Clark had Bacon court-martialed, and although Bacon was exonerated, his arrest would again cause him to miss a major battle.

The 6th Michigan, brigaded under Neal Dow with the 128th New York, 15th New Hampshire, and 26th Connecticut, joined in Banks's Siege of Port Hudson and suffered 118 casualties in the ill-fated frontal assault of May 27. Bacon returned to the regiment just in time for Banks's ill-advised second attack on June 14. This time, the Michiganders’ loss was limited to eight wounded, due only to Captain Corden's refusal to press a suicidal attack.

Clark's regiment spent the balance of the siege in trench warfare, sickening under poor living conditions and enduring constant sharpshooting. Bacon was arrested again, this time for openly speaking ill of the army's leadership and prospects at Port Hudson. The 6th Michigan Infantry's final engagement came in a night assault on June 29, in which 35 Michiganders were ordered to storm the Citadel, one of the strongest fortifications at Port Hudson. Nine men were killed and eight wounded. Assistant Surgeon Milton Chase called the assault—ordered by habitually drunk division commander William Dwight (and remembered as the “whiskey charge”)—“a wicked loss of life.” The 6th Michigan, ravaged by battle losses and disease, mustered just 160 men and officers present for duty as of July 4.

Port Hudson surrendered on July 9, and the 6th Michigan was converted into the 6th Michigan Heavy Artillery soon after. New recruits quickly outnumbered the few remaining veterans, and the character of the unit's service was transformed into inactive garrison duty.

== Total strength and casualties ==
The regiment had 2 officers and 76 enlisted men killed in action or mortally wounded. 6 officers and 498 enlisted men died of disease, for a total of 582 fatalities. This exceeds the loss of any other regiment from the Great Lakes State in the Civil War.

== Commanders ==
- Frederick William Curtenius
- Thomas Scott Clark
- Edward Savage Bacon
- Charles Edward Clarke
- John Corden
- Harrison Soule

== See also ==
- List of Michigan Civil War Units
- Michigan in the American Civil War
- Daniel de Marbelle
