= 1st Mississippi Cavalry Regiment =

Cavalry regiment of the Confederate States Army

- Active: 1861–1865
- Country: Confederate States
- Allegiance: Mississippi
- Branch: Army
- Type: Cavalry
- Size: Regiment
- Facings: Yellow
- Arms: Maynard carbines
- Engagements: American Civil War; Battle of Shiloh; Holly Springs Raid; Vicksburg Campaign; Meridian Campaign; Atlanta campaign; Franklin–Nashville campaign; Battle of Ebenezer Church; Battle of Selma

Commanders
- Notable commanders: F. A. Montgomery

The 1st Mississippi Cavalry Regiment was a unit of the Confederate States Army during the American Civil War. Originally designated the 1st Battalion Mississippi Cavalry, the unit was upgraded to a regiment in 1862, and fought in many battles of the Western theater of the American Civil War.

== Formation and Shiloh ==
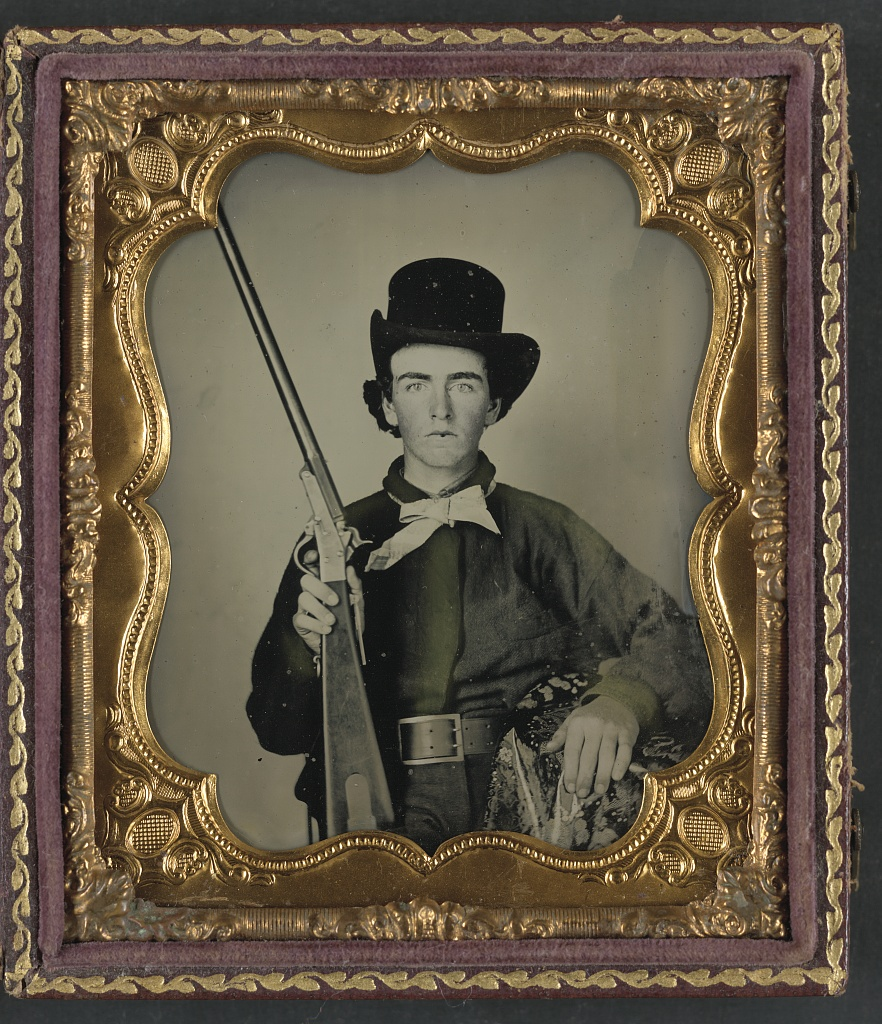
Unidentified soldier of the 1st Mississippi Cavalry Battalion, holding a Maynard carbine.

In the spring of 1861, various Mississippi cavalry companies volunteered for military service and traveled to Tennessee, including the Pontotoc Dragoons, an prewar volunteer company dating back to the time of the Mexican-American War. Other cavalry companies from Mississippi, including the Noxubee Cavalry, Thompson Cavalry, and Bolivar Troop were organized into the 1st Battalion Mississippi Cavalry at Union City, Tennessee by Captain John H. Miller of the Pontotoc Dragoons. The Battalion mustered into Confederate service on June 2, under the command of General Benjamin F. Cheatham. The Battalion was sent to New Madrid, Missouri, and fought in a skirmish at Bird's Point, Missouri on October 14 and the Battle of Belmont on November 7.

Col. A.J. Lindsay was appointed to take command of the Battalion in April, 1862. Lindsay was a former West Point cadet and a veteran of the Mexican-American War. The Battalion fought at the Battle of Shiloh, earning notice for a cavalry charge which successfully captured a Michigan artillery battery. During the later stages of the battle on April 6, Col. Lindsay was tasked by General Leonidas Polk with gathering all the Confederate cavalry on the field and cutting off the Union troops' line of retreat. The Battalion was reorganized as a regiment after the battle and designated the 1st Mississippi Cavalry. Another unrelated unit, Wirt Adams' Cavalry Regiment, briefly held the designation of 1st Mississippi Cavalry Regiment in 1861 before being renamed. The total strength of the Regiment in July 1862 was reported as 22 officers and 220 men. At the time of reorganization, Col. Lindsay was not re-elected, and R.A. Pinson of the Pontotoc Dragoons was elected as Colonel. Lt. Col. Miller, the original organizer of the 1st Battalion, resigned his commission after Shiloh and was later killed near Ripley, Mississippi in 1863.

== 1862-1863 ==
After Shiloh, the 1st Mississippi Cavalry was placed under the command of General William Hicks Jackson and in the second half of 1862 took part in numerous cavalry raids across North Mississippi and Tennessee, destroying railroads and depots used by Union troops. The 1st Mississippi clashed with Federal troops at Bolivar, Tennessee on August 30, and took part in a battle near Denmark, Tennessee on September 1.

The 1st Cavalry acted as rearguard during the Second Battle of Corinth, then retreated to Holly Springs, Mississippi, and later to Grenada, Mississippi with General Earl Van Dorn's forces. In December the Regiment took part in Van Dorn's Holly Springs Raid, a surprise attack which destroyed a large Union supply depot.

In 1863 the Regiment joined General George B. Cosby's brigade, and played a supporting role at the Battle of Thompson's Station in Tennessee, and the First Battle of Franklin in April. The Regiment was then sent to the Big Black River in Mississippi in support of Confederate forces defending Vicksburg, however they arrived too late to relieve the besieged garrison, which surredered on July 4. A detachment of the 1st Cavalry was stationed in Louisiana in 1863, and took part in the Battle of Ponchatoula. Under the command of Capt. Gadi Herron the detachment in Louisiana captured the Federal gunboat Barataria on April 7, and opposed Grierson's Raid.

== 1864-1865 ==
The 1st Mississippi was transferred to the command of General Sul Ross, and clashed with Union General William T. Sherman's forces during the 1864 Meridian campaign, harassing the Union troops on their march to Meridian and back to Vicksburg.

In May 1864 the Regiment moved to Georgia to support the Confederate defense in the Atlanta campaign under Frank Crawford Armstrong's brigade. The First Mississippi was continuously engaged during this campaign, fighting at Adairsville, New Hope Church, Dallas, Atlanta, Ezra Church, Lovejoy's Station, and Jonesborough, at times dismounting from their horses and serving in the defensive trenches.

In the subsequent Franklin–Nashville campaign directed by General John Bell Hood, the 1st Mississippi formed part of the Cavalry Corps led by General Nathan Bedford Forrest. The Regiment fought at the Battle of Allatoona, the Battle of Columbia, the Battle of Franklin, Murfreesboro and Anthony's Hill before retreating to Mississippi.

In the spring of 1865, the 1st Mississippi Cavalry joined Forrest's cavalry forces who were opposing an expedition by Federal troops through Alabama. The Regiment fought at the Battle of Ebenezer Church in this final campaign, and most of the men and officers were captured at the Battle of Selma on April 2.

== Regimental order of battle ==
Units of 1st Mississippi Cavalry Regiment included:

- Company A, "Carroll Rangers" of Carroll County.
- Company B, "Thompson Cavalry" of Lafayette County.
- Company C
- Company E
- Company F, "Noxubee Troopers" of Noxubee County.
- Company G, "Noxubee Cavalry" of Noxubee County.
- Company H, "Bolivar Troop" of Bolivar County.
- Company I, "Pontotoc Dragoons" of Pontotoc County.
- Company K, "Pontotoc Dragoons" (2nd company).

== Commanding officers ==
Commanders of the 1st Mississippi Cavalry Regiment:

- Col. Andrew Jackson Lindsay
- Col. R.A. Pinson
- Lt. Col. John H. Miller
- Lt. Col. F. A. Montgomery

== Notable members ==
- Hezekiah William Foote, captain of the Noxubee Cavalry in the 1st battalion. Member of the Mississippi House of Representatives and the Mississippi Senate. Great-Grandfather of Civil War historian Shelby Foote.

== See also ==
- List of Mississippi Civil War Confederate units
