= Frank A. Montgomery =

American politician (1830–1903)

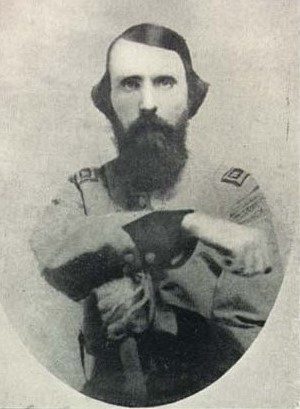
- Montgomery in uniform, 1861

Member of the Mississippi House of Representatives from Coahoma County
- In office 1896–1897

Member of the Mississippi House of Representatives from Bolivar County
- In office 1880–1885

Personal details
- Born: Frank Alexander Montgomery; January 7, 1830 Adams County, Mississippi, U.S.
- Died: December 16, 1903 (aged 73) Bolivar County, Mississippi, U.S.
- Resting place: Beulah Cemetery, Bolivar County, Mississippi, U.S. 33°47′50.4″N 90°58′48.4″W
- Party: Democratic
- Other political affiliations: Whig
- Spouse: Charlotte Clark Montgomery (m. 1848; died 1898)
- Children: 9
- Parent: James Jefferson Montgomery (father)
- Relatives: Charles Clark (brother-in-law)
- Education: Allegheny College

Military service
- Allegiance: Confederate States
- Branch: Army
- Years of service: 1861–1865
- Rank: Lieutenant Colonel
- Unit: 1st Mississippi Cavalry Regiment
- Battles: American Civil War: Battle of Belmont; Battle of Corinth; Battle of Dallas; Battle of Ezra Church; Battle of Jonesboro; Battle of Selma (POW)

Frank Alexander Montgomery (January 7, 1830 – December 16, 1903) was an American politician best known for his memoir of life as a Confederate cavalry officer in the Western Theater of the American Civil War (1861–1865) called Reminiscences of a Mississippian in Peace and War (1901).

== Biography ==
Frank Alexander Montgomery was born on January 7, 1830, in Adams County, Mississippi, to James Jefferson Montgomery. He was Lieutenant Colonel of the 1st Mississippi Cavalry Regiment during the American Civil War. He served eight years as a member of the Mississippi House of Representatives and one term as Judge of the Fourth Circuit Court District of Mississippi. He died on December 16, 1903, and is buried at Beulah Cemetery, Bolivar County, Mississippi.

== Selected works ==
- Reminiscences of a Mississippian in Peace and War (1901)

== See also ==
- List of Allegheny College people
- List of people from Mississippi
- List of slave owners

Mississippi House of Representatives
Unknown	Member of the Mississippi House of Representatives from Bolivar County; 1880–1885	Unknown
Unknown	Member of the Mississippi House of Representatives from Coahoma County; 1896–1897	Unknown
