= John Davis (American Civil War soldier) =

American soldier (1838–1901)

- Born: January 1, 1838; Carroll, Kentucky
- Died: December 30, 1901 (aged 63); Colorado
- Burial place: Greenwood Cemetery; Cañon City, Colorado
- Military career
- Allegiance: United States of America
- Branch: United States Army
- Rank: Private
- Unit: 17th Indiana Volunteer Mounted Infantry - Company F
- Awards: Medal of Honor

Private John Davis (January 1, 1838 – December 30, 1901) was an American soldier who fought in the American Civil War. Davis received the United States' highest award for bravery during combat, the Medal of Honor, for his action at Culloden, Georgia, in 1865. He was honored with the award on 17 June 1865.

== Biography ==
Davis was born in Carroll, Kentucky, on 1 January 1838. He enlisted into Company F, 17th Indiana Mounted Infantry on June 12, 1861, and mustered out on August 8, 1865. He died on December 30, 1901, and his remains are interred at Greenwood Cemetery in Cañon City, Colorado.

== Medal of Honor citation ==
The President of the United States of America, in the name of Congress, takes pleasure in presenting the Medal of Honor to Private John Davis, United States Army, for extraordinary heroism on April, 1865, while serving with Company F, 17th Indiana Mounted Infantry, in action at Culloden, Georgia, for capture of flag of Worrill Grays (Confederate States of America).

== See also ==
- List of American Civil War Medal of Honor recipients: A–F

== Bibliography ==
- Terrell, William Henry Harrison, Adjutant General (1866). Roster of Enlisted Men [incl.] Indiana Regiments Sixth to Twenty-Ninth 1861-1865 (PDF). Report of the Adjutant General of the State of Indiana. Vol. IV. Indianapolis, IN: Samuel R. Douglas, State Printer. p. 344–371. OCLC 558004259.
