= Jacob G. Vail =

American Union brevet brigadier general during the American Civil War

Jacob Garetson Vail (1827 – October 9, 1884) was an American Union brevet brigadier general during the period of the American Civil War. He received his appointment as brevet brigadier general dated to March 13, 1865.

Vail had served as colonel of the 17th Indiana Mounted Infantry, a regiment which was organized at Camp Morton in Indianapolis in May 1861. After the war, he joined the Republican Party and served as sheriff of Gibson County, Indiana, from April 1866 until February 28, 1868.

== See also ==
- List of American Civil War brevet generals (Union)
