= Milo Smith Hascall =

American lawyer

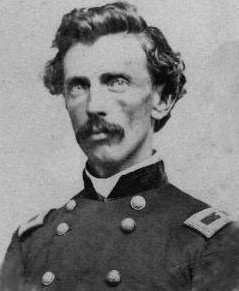
- Born: August 5, 1829; LeRoy, New York, US
- Died: August 30, 1904 (aged 75); Oak Park, Illinois, US
- Burial place: Forest Home Cemetery, Chicago, Illinois
- Alma mater: United States Military Academy, Class of 1852
- Military career
- Allegiance: United States of America; Union
- Branch: United States Army; Union Army
- Service years: 1852–1853, 1861–1864
- Rank: Brigadier General
- Commands: 17th Indiana Infantry Regiment
- Conflicts: American Civil War; West Virginia Campaign; Siege of Corinth; Kentucky Campaign; Battle of Perryville; Battle of Stones River; Battle of Chickamauga; Battle of Chattanooga; Atlanta campaign
- Other work: Banker, Real Estate Executive

Milo Smith Hascall (August 5, 1829 – August 30, 1904) was an American soldier, banker, and real estate executive who served as a general in the Union Army during the American Civil War.

== Early life and career ==
Milo S. Hascall was born in LeRoy in Genesee County, New York. In 1846 he moved to Goshen, Indiana, where he clerked in a store and taught school. Two years later, he was appointed as a cadet at the United States Military Academy, graduating in 1852. He was assigned as a second lieutenant in the 2nd U.S. Artillery and was stationed in New England doing garrison duty in Newport Harbor, Rhode Island. After a year of service in the Regular Army, he resigned his commission.

Hascall went back to Goshen, where he became a lawyer and filled various political offices. He also was a railroad contractor, district attorney, and the clerk of the county courts. He practiced law in Goshen, Indiana, from 1855 till 1861, serving as prosecuting attorney of Elkhart and Lagrange counties from 1856 till 1858, and school examiner and clerk of courts from 1859 till 1861.

== Civil War service ==
At the outbreak of the Civil War, he enlisted as a private, but was soon appointed aide-de-camp to General Thomas A. Morris, with the rank of captain, and assisted in organizing six volunteer regiments. On June 12, 1861, he was made colonel of the 17th Indiana Infantry and took part in the successful West Virginia campaign under Major General George B. McClellan. In December 1861, he was ordered to Louisville, Kentucky, and placed in command of a brigade consisting of the 17th Indiana, 6th Ohio, 43d Ohio, and 15th Indiana regiments, assigned to the division commanded by General William "Bull" Nelson. Later that month, he was given charge of a brigade in Thomas J. Wood’s division of Don Carlos Buell’s forces in the Army of the Ohio. His troops arrived at Shiloh the day after fighting ended, but did take part in the Siege of Corinth.

Hascall was commissioned as a brigadier general of volunteers on April 25, 1862. Having been transferred to the Army of the Cumberland, he was put in command of a brigade which fought through the Kentucky Campaign. He continued to serve in Tennessee through March 1863. During the Battle of Stones River (December 31, 1862 to January 3, 1863), he assumed command of the 1st Division when General Wood was wounded. During the battle, Hascall led reinforcements to the Round Forest where he took charge of the defense of that place and decided it had to be held at all costs. After the battle he was sent to Indianapolis, Indiana, to take command of the District of Indiana, charged with returning deserters from Ohio, Illinois, and Indiana. He also suppressed dissident opinions in Indiana newspapers, including the Plymouth Democrat.

He then was transferred to the Army of the Ohio and placed in command of the 3rd Division in the XXIII Corps. Later that year, he took part in the battles the defense of Knoxville (November to December, 1863).

The next year Hascall commanded the 2nd Brigade, 2nd Division, XXIII Corps for the first part of the Atlanta campaign. During the battle of Resaca 2nd Division commander, Brig. Gen. Henry M. Judah failed to reconnoiter a river valley to his front before attacking. During the attack Hascall's brigade accidentally crossed in front of Brig. Gen. John M. Palmer's division before it deployed. Despite both units becoming intertwined, Judah pushed Hascall forward only to have his men get stuck in the muddy creek. On May 18 Hascall assumed command of the 2nd Division after General Judah was relieved of command. Hascall led the division throughout the rest of Atlanta Campaign.

== Postbellum career ==
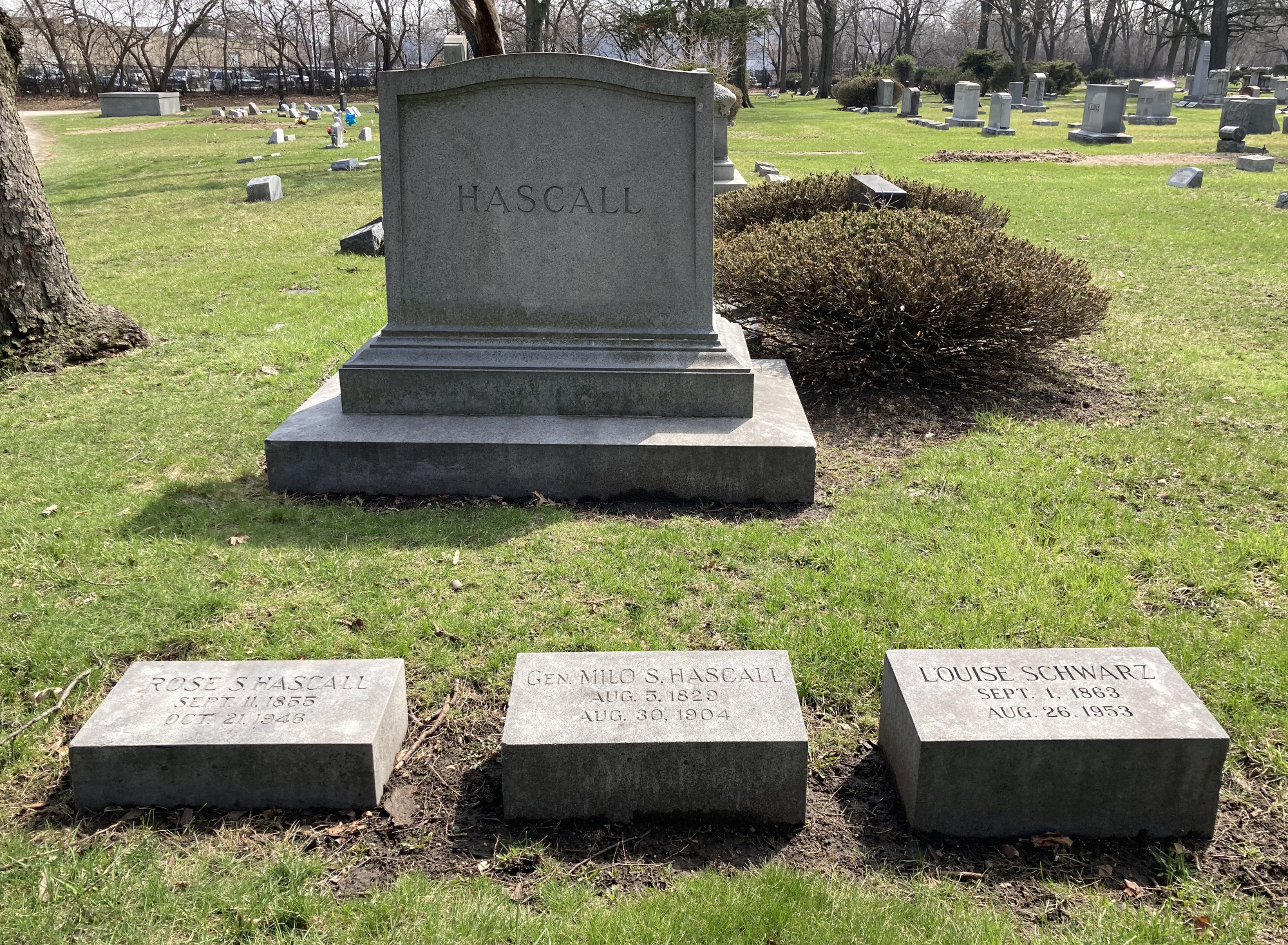
Hascall's grave at Forest Home Cemetery

He resigned on October 27, 1864, and returned to Goshen, where he engaged in banking, but later entered the real-estate business in Chicago, Illinois.

He was buried at Forest Home Cemetery, in Forest Park, Illinois.

== See also ==
- List of American Civil War generals (Union)

== Bibliography ==
- Klinger, Michael J. "Battle of Resaca: Botched Union Attack". battlefields.org. American Battlefield Trust.
- Peck, Harry Thurston; Gilman, Daniel Coit & Colby, Frank Moore, eds. (1905). Corinth (PDF). The New International Encyclopedia. Vol. V. New York, NY: D. Appleton & Company. p. 413. OCLC 1049897922.
- Terrell, William Henry Harrison, Adjutant General (1865). Roster of Officers [incl.] Indiana Regiments Sixth to Seventy-Fourth 1861-1865 (PDF). Report of the Adjutant General of the State of Indiana. Vol. II. Indianapolis, IN: W. R. Holloway, State Printer. pp. 145–157. OCLC 558004259.
- Towne, Stephen E. (2006). "Killing the Serpent Speedily: Governor Morton, General Hascall, and the Suppression of the Democratic Press in Indiana, 1863" (pdf). Civil War History. LII (1). Kent State University Press: 41. ISSN 0009-8078.
- Wilson, James Grant & Fiske, John, eds. (1887). Hascall, Milo Smith (PDF). Appletons' Cyclopaedia of American Biography. Vol. III. New York, NY: D. Appleton & Company. p. 109. OCLC 906067060.
