= 6th Michigan Heavy Artillery Regiment =

- Michigan state flag
- Active: June 10, 1863, to August 20, 1865
- Country: United States
- Allegiance: Union
- Branch: Artillery
- Engagements: Battle of Baton Rouge; Siege of Port Hudson; Battle of Mobile Bay

The 6th Michigan Heavy Artillery Regiment was an artillery regiment that served in the Union Army during the American Civil War.

== Service ==
The 6th Michigan Heavy Artillery was redesignated from the 6th Michigan Volunteer Infantry Regiment at Port Hudson, Louisiana, as a reward for its performance at the Siege of Port Hudson.

The regiment was mustered out on August 20, 1865.

== Total strength and casualties ==
The regiment suffered 2 officers and 76 enlisted men who were killed in action or mortally wounded and 6 officers and 498 enlisted men who died of disease, for a total of 582 fatalities.

== Commanders ==
- Colonel

Frederick W. Cortenius

Thomas S. Clark

- Captain

S. F. Craig

== See also ==
- List of Michigan Civil War Units
- Michigan in the American Civil War
