= Spring Hill, Georgia =

Unincorporated community in Georgia, U.S.

Coordinates: 33°51′53″N 84°29′12″W

Spring Hill is an unincorporated community in Cobb County, Georgia, United States, which is located just to the northwest of Atlanta.

It is a small area around Teasley Elementary School on Spring Hill Road between Smyrna and Vinings. The area has undergone massive gentrification in recent years as the Atlanta area has boomed. These changes are emblematic of the Atlanta area over the past decade and a half. Home Depot makes its headquarters in the Spring Hill area.
