= USS Barataria (1862) =

Steamer captured by the Union Army during the American Civil War

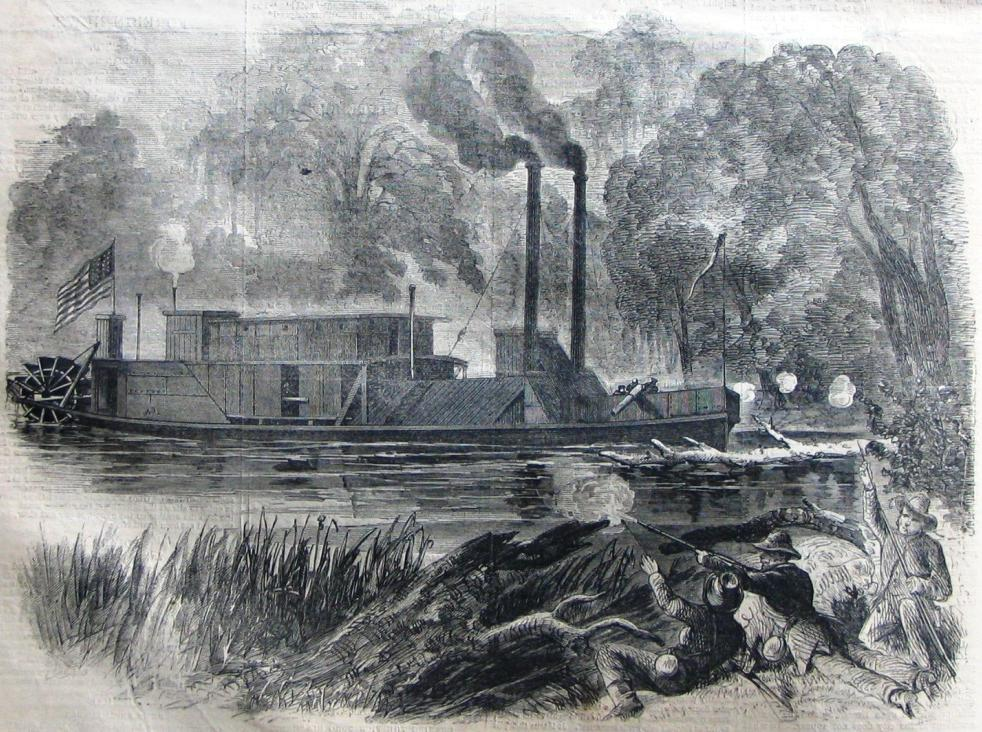
- USS Barataria snagged in Amite River

History

United States
- Laid down: date unknown
- Launched: date unknown
- Acquired: January 1, 1863
- In service: circa January 1863
- Out of service: April 7, 1863
- Stricken: 1863 (est.)
- Captured: by Union Army forces; April 25, 1862
- Fate: Scuttled, April 7, 1863

General characteristics
- Displacement: 400 tons
- Length: 125 ft (38 m)
- Beam: not known
- Draught: 3 ft 6 in (1.07 m)
- Propulsion: steam engine; stern wheel-propelled
- Speed: not known
- Complement: not known
- Armament: two 24-pounder howitzers
- Armour: ironclad

The first USS Barataria was a steamer captured by the Union Army during the American Civil War. She was used by the Union Navy as a gunboat in support of the Union Navy blockade of Confederate waterways.

== Barataria captured by the Union Army and placed into Union Navy service ==
Barataria, an ironclad gunboat, was seized by the Union Army at New Orleans, Louisiana, shortly after Flag Officer David Farragut's task force from the West Gulf Blockading Squadron captured that city on April 25, 1862. The Union Army used the steamer through the end of the year and transferred her to the Navy on January 1, 1863.

== Modified for Louisiana coastal and inland operations ==
The steamer was outfitted at New Orleans and armed with two 24-pounder howitzers so that she might serve as a gunboat in the shallow inland waters of Louisiana—such as Lake Borgne, Lake Pontchartrain, and Lake Maurepas.

Although few records of her service have survived, it seems that Barataria was used primarily to support operations of Army troops commanded by Major General Godfrey Weitzel in Louisiana's coastal inland waters.

== Barataria strikes a snag in the river, is attacked by Confederates ==
While on such a mission, the gunboat commanded by Acting Ensign James F. Perkins struck a snag in Lake Maurepas at the mouth of the Amite River early on the morning of April 7, 1863. Throughout that day, her small crew assisted by Union soldiers of the 6th Michigan Volunteers fought off Confederate guerrilla attacks while also jettisoning equipment to lighten ship. However, even sacrificing her bow gun and emptying her boiler failed to refloat Barataria by sunset.

== Barataria is put to the torch to prevent capture while her crew escapes ==
Then, lest she fall into enemy hands, Perkins put the torch to the stranded stern wheeler; and her magazine exploded soon after all hands had escaped in small boats.
