= Battle of Ebenezer Church =

1865 battle of the American Civil War

- Part of American Civil War
Date	April 1, 1865 (161 years ago)
Location	Chilton County, Alabama 32°39′18.5″N 86°55′34.8″W
Result	Union victory

Belligerents
United States (Union)	Confederate States

Commanders and leaders
(United States) James H. Wilson	(Confederate States of America) Nathan B. Forrest (WIA)

Units involved
(United States) Cavalry Corps, Military Division of the Mississippi	Forrest's Cavalry Corps; Alabama militia

Strength
9,000	1,500–5,000

Casualties and losses
12 killed, 40 wounded	Unknown 300 captured, 3 artillery pieces captured
- Location within Alabama

The Battle of Ebenezer Church was fought on April 1, 1865, in Chilton County, Alabama during the American Civil War. It was part of the Union campaign through Alabama and Georgia, known as Wilson's Raid, in the final full month of the Civil War.

== Battle ==
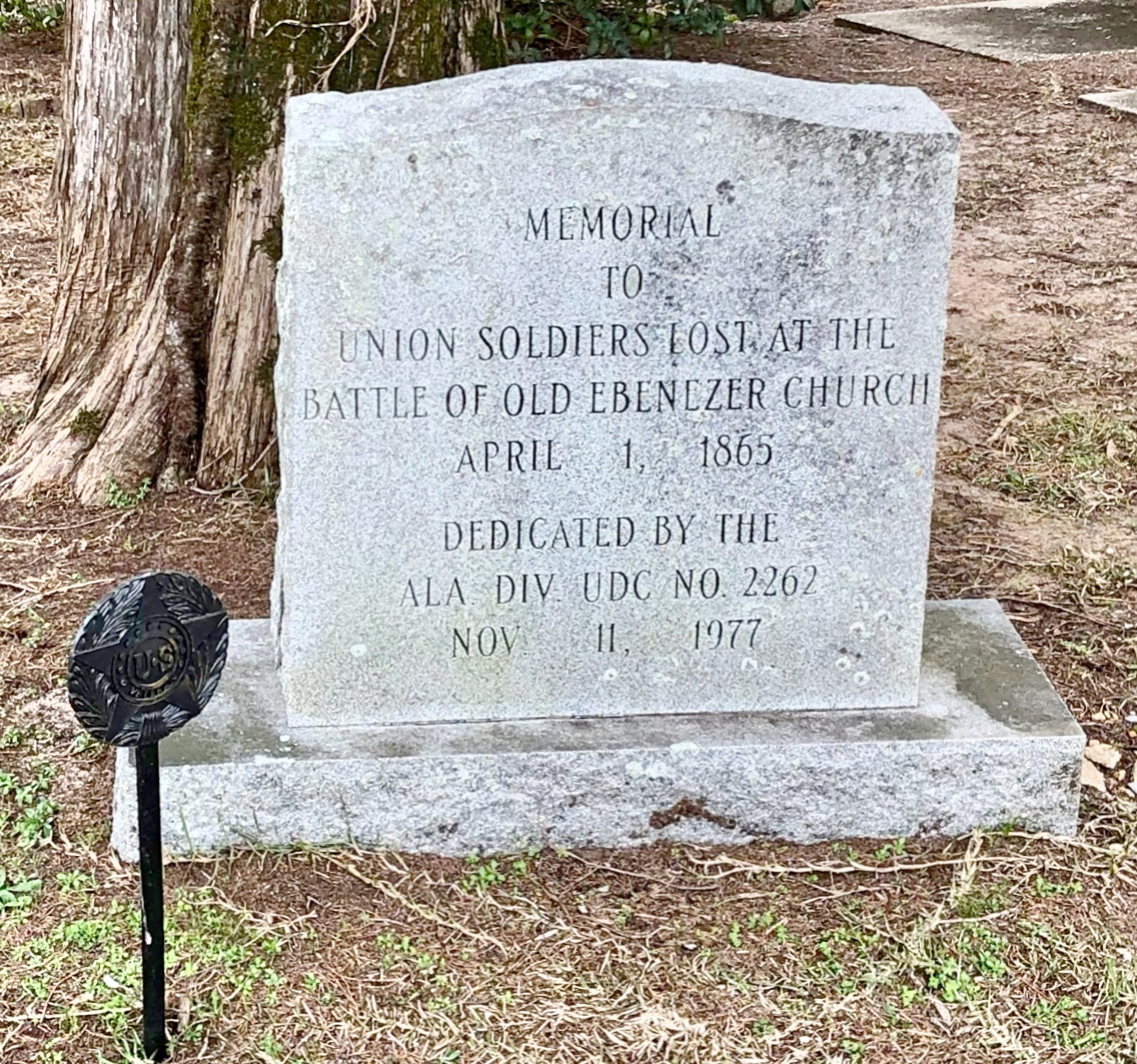
The Old Ebenezer Church War Memorial commemorates Union soldiers lost at Ebenezer Church

Forrest had at least 1,500 and as many as 5,000 troops, but some were ill-trained Alabama State Troops. Wilson had at least 9,000 troopers of his original 13,480-man force available. Forrest had been unable to concentrate scattered Confederate forces to face Wilson's larger force, which was armed with 7-shot Spencer repeating carbines. After a brief but initially heavy engagement, the Alabama State Troops' line broke and Wilson's men drove the Confederates back toward the defenses of Selma, Alabama. Selma had an arsenal and industry that Wilson attacked and destroyed after his men again defeated the Confederate troopers at the Battle of Selma the following day. After the battle at Ebenezer Church, the Union troops burned the railroad depot at Plantersville and a cotton warehouse.

Confederate casualties were not reported but Wilson's force captured 300 of Forrest's men and 3 artillery pieces. Wilson's command had 12 killed and 40 wounded. Forrest received a slight saber wound, which he later said would have been fatal if the Union officer, Captain James D. Taylor, had been able to strike him with the point rather than the blade. Forrest killed Taylor, the last of 33 men he killed during the war, with a pistol shot. His personal heroics in the battle came at the expense of neglecting the defense of Selma.

== See also ==
- List of American Civil War battles
- List of battles 1801–1900
- Troop engagements of the American Civil War, 1865
