= Battle of Selma =

1865 battle of the American Civil War

- Part of American Civil War
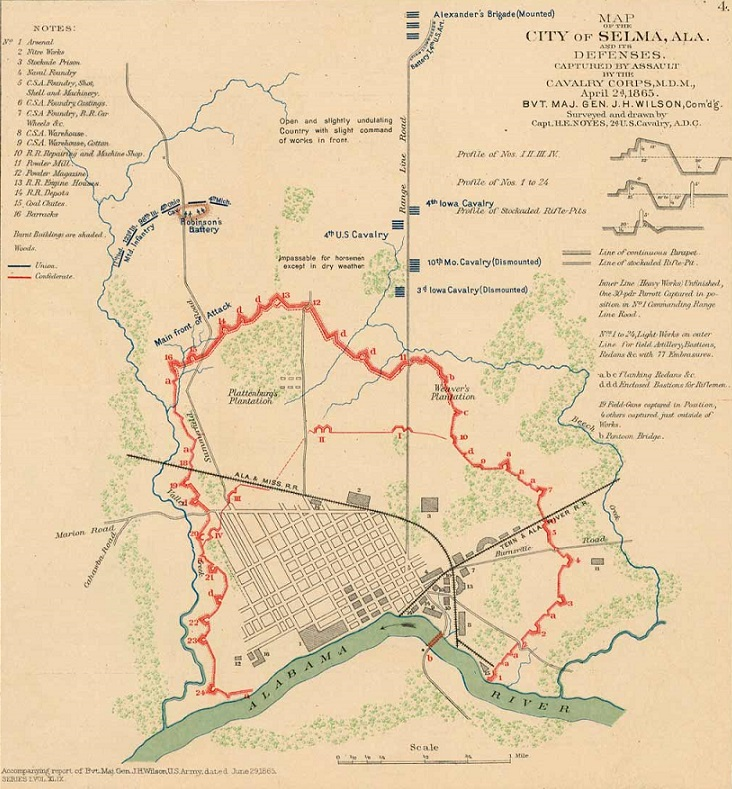
- Map of the City of Selma, Ala. and its Defenses
Date	April 2, 1865 (161 years ago)
Location	Dallas County, Alabama 32.426833°N 87.014150°W
Result	Union victory

Belligerents
United States (Union)	Confederate States

Commanders and leaders
(United States) James H. Wilson	(Confederate States of America) Richard Taylor (Confederate States of America) Nathan B. Forrest

Units involved
(United States) Cavalry Corps, Military Division of the Mississippi	Armstrong's Brigade; Crossland's Brigade; Roddey's Brigade; Myrick's Artillery Battalion; Alabama militia

Strength
13,500	5,000

Casualties and losses
359	2,700
- Location within Alabama

The Battle of Selma was fought on April 2, 1865, in Dallas County, Alabama during the American Civil War. It was part of the Union campaign through Alabama and Georgia, known as Wilson's Raid, in the final full month of the Civil War.

Brevet Major General James H. Wilson, commanding three divisions of Union cavalry, about 13,500 men, led his men south from Gravelly Springs, Alabama, on March 22, 1865. Opposed by Confederate Lieutenant-General Nathan B. Forrest, Wilson skillfully continued his march and eventually defeated him in a running battle at Ebenezer Church, on April 1. Continuing towards Selma, Wilson split his command into three columns. Although Selma was well-defended, the Union columns broke through the defenses at separate points forcing the Confederates to surrender the city, although many of the officers and men, including Forrest and Lieutenant-General Richard Taylor, escaped.

== Background ==
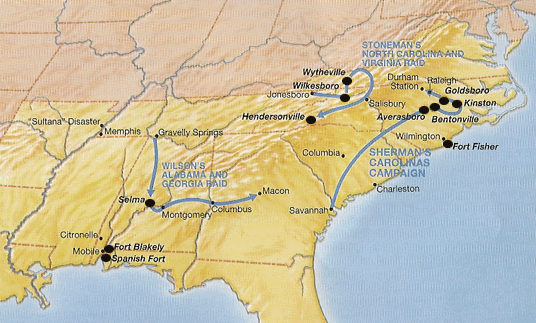
The Western Theater of the American Civil War in 1865.

On March 30, 1865, General Wilson detached Brigadier-General John T. Croxton's brigade to destroy all Confederate property at Tuscaloosa, Alabama. After capturing a Confederate courier who carried dispatches from Forrest describing the strength and disposition of his scattered forces, Wilson sent a brigade to destroy the bridge across the Cahaba River at Centreville. This effectively cut off Forrest from reinforcement. It also began a running fight that did not end until after the fall of Selma. Forrest had scattered his command through Mississippi, Alabama, and Tennessee, to refit his command following the Middle Tennessee Campaign, and Forrest spent several days in late March struggling to consolidate his force before Wilson's cavalry could advance south.

On the afternoon of April 1, following skirmishing in the morning, Wilson's advance guard ran into Forrest's line of battle at Ebenezer Church, where the Randolph Road intersected the main Selma road. Forrest had hoped to bring his entire force to bear on Wilson. However, because of delays caused by flooding, plus earlier contacts with the enemy, Forrest could only muster less than 2,000 men, many of whom were not veterans but poorly trained militia consisting of old men and young boys.

The outnumbered Confederates fought for over an hour, as Wilson deployed more Union cavalry and artillery on the field. Forrest himself was wounded by a saber-wielding Union captain, whom he killed with his revolver. Finally, a Union cavalry charge broke the Confederate militia, causing Forrest to be flanked on his right. He was forced to retreat under severe pressure. The battle failed to significantly delay or damage Wilson's force.

== Prelude ==
Key commanders
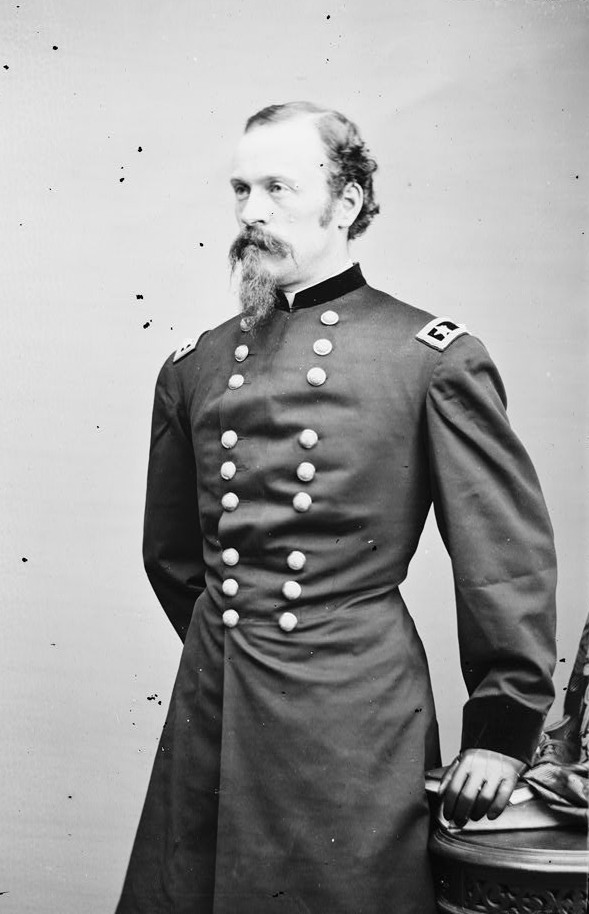
Bvt. Maj. Gen.
James H. Wilson,
USA

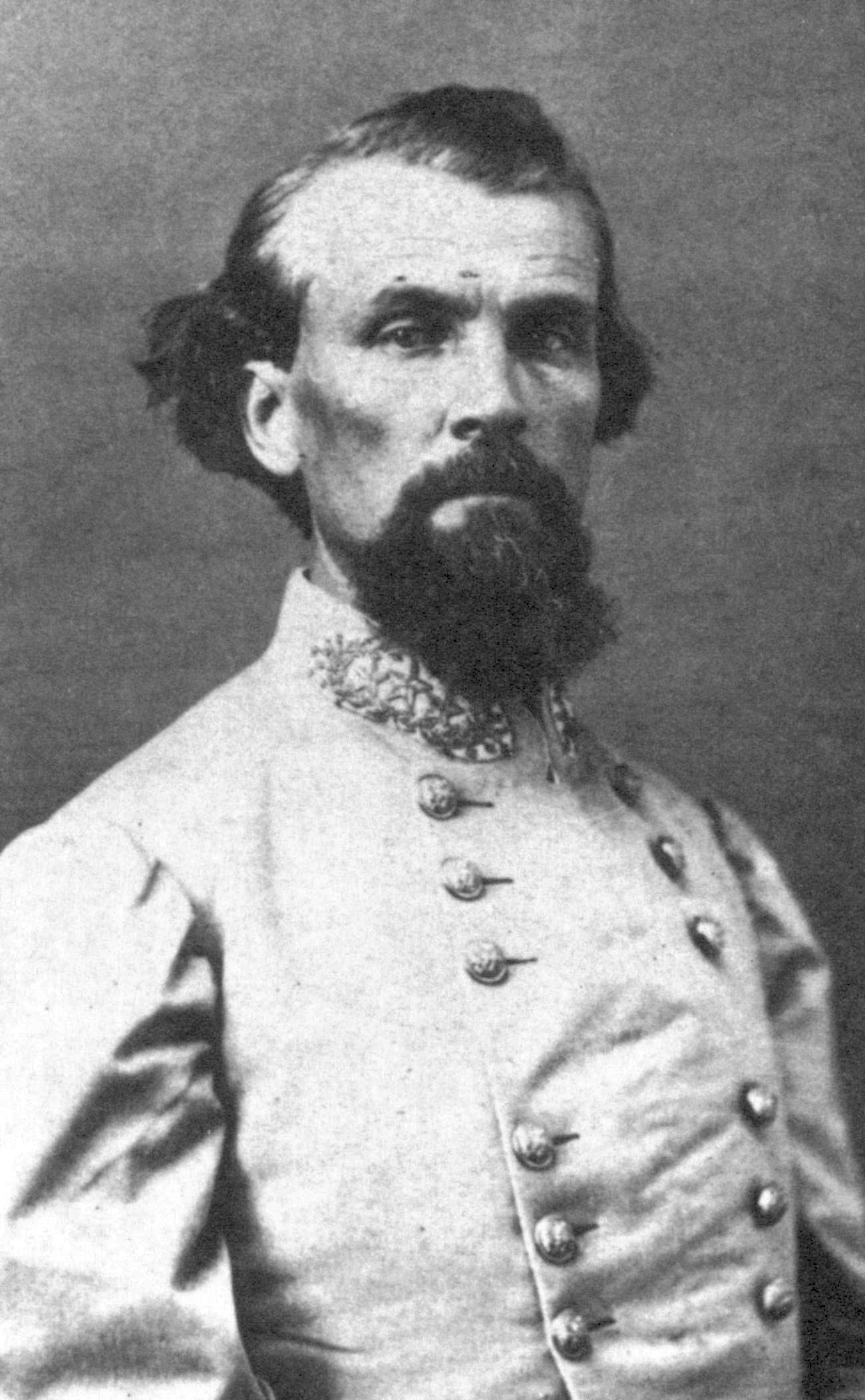
Lieut. Gen.
Nathan B. Forrest,
CSA

Early the next morning Forrest arrived at Selma, Alabama, a town of about 10,000 inhabitants, "horse and rider covered in blood." He advised Lieutenant-General Richard Taylor, departmental commander, to leave the city. Taylor did so after giving Forrest command of the defense. Selma was protected by three miles of fortifications, which ran in a semicircle around the city. They were anchored on the north and south by the Alabama River. The works had been built two years earlier and, while neglected since then, they were still formidable. The defenses were from 8 to 12 feet high, 15 feet thick at the base, and had a ditch 4 feet wide and 5 feet deep along the front. Before this was a picket fence of heavy posts planted in the ground, 5 feet high, and sharpened at the top. At prominent positions, earthen forts were built with artillery in position to cover the ground over which an assault would have to be made.

The Confederates defending Selma consisted of Armstrong's, Crossland's, and Roddey's brigades, Myrick's Artillery Battalion, Forrest's escort, and Alabama militia. Forrest's line of battle was so long that his 2,000 men were separated from each other by five to ten feet. There being from five to ten times as many Union troops, their line was close together. Just before the battle, it looked like they were all over the field to their front.

Wilson's force arrived at the Selma fortifications at 2 p.m. He placed Gen. Long's division across the Summerfield Road, with the Chicago Board of Trade Battery in support. Upton's Division was placed across the Range Line Road with Battery I, 4th U.S. Artillery in support. Wilson had 9,000 well-armed and well-trained troops available to make the assault. Wilson's plan was for Upton to send in a 300-man detachment after dark to cross the swamp on the Confederate right, enter the works, and begin a flanking movement toward the center moving along the line of fortifications. Then a single gun from Upton's artillery would fire the signal for an attack by the entire Federal corps. At 5 p.m., however, the ammunition train in Wilson's rear was attacked by advance elements of Forrest's scattered forces who were moving toward Selma. Long and Upton had both positioned significant numbers of the troops in their rear to guard against such an event. However, Long decided on his own to begin an assault against the Selma fortifications to neutralize the attack in his rear.

== Battle ==
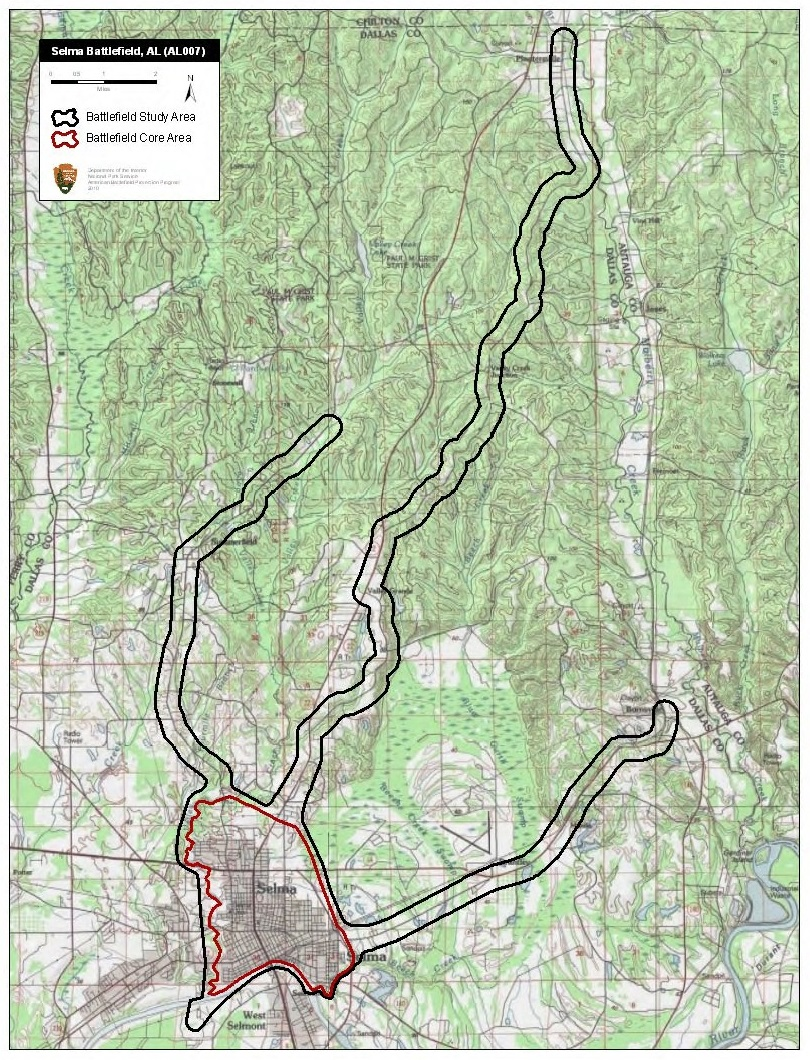
Map of Selma Battlefield core and study areas by the American Battlefield Protection Program.

Long's men attacked in a single rank in three main lines, dismounted and firing their 7-shot Spencer repeating rifles. They were supported by their artillery. The Confederates defenders replied with heavy small arms and artillery fire. The attackers suffered many casualties, including General Long himself, but the attack continued. Once the Union troops reached the works, vicious hand-to-hand fighting broke out. Many on both sides were struck down with clubbed muskets. Still, Union troops kept pouring into the works. In less than 30 minutes, Long's men had captured the works protecting the Summerfield Road from the hopelessly outnumbered defenders.

Meanwhile, General Upton, observing Long's success, ordered his division forward. Soon, U.S. flags could be seen waving over the works from Range Line Road to Summerfield Road. Once the outer works had fallen, General Wilson, himself led the 4th U.S. Cavalry Regiment in a mounted charge down the Range Line Road toward the unfinished inner line of works. The retreating Confederate forces, having reached the inner works, rallied and poured a devastating fire into the charging Union column. This stopped the charge and sent General Wilson sprawling to the ground when his favorite horse was wounded. Wilson quickly remounted his injured horse and ordered a dismounted assault by several regiments. Mixed units of Confederate troops at the Selma railroad depot and the adjoining banks of the railroad bed tried to make a stand next to the Plantersville Road (present-day Broad Street). Fighting there was heavy, but by 7 p.m. the superior numbers of Union troops had allowed them to flank the Southern positions, causing the defenders to abandon the depot as well as the inner line of works.

== Aftermath ==
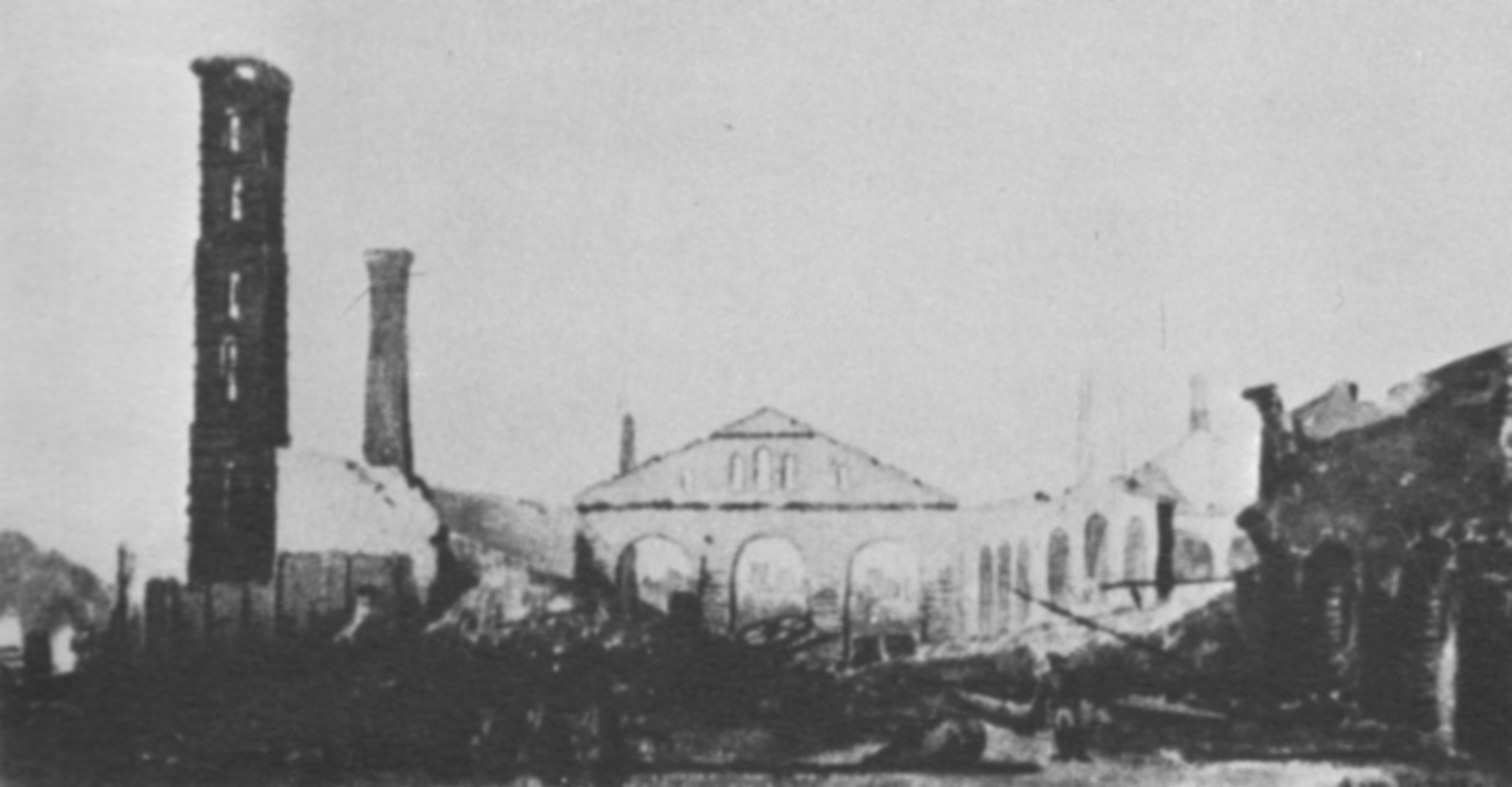
Ruins of the Confederate States Naval Foundry at Selma in 1865.

Union troops rounded up hundreds of prisoners, but hundreds more escaped in the darkness down the Burnsville Road. These included Generals Forrest, Armstrong, and Roddey. To the west, many Confederate soldiers continued to fight the pursuing Union soldiers to the eastern side of Valley Creek. They then escaped in the darkness by swimming the Alabama River near the mouth of Valley Creek (where the present-day Battle of Selma Reenactment was held.) During his escape from the city, Forrest killed another Union trooper, the thirtieth he had killed in personal combat in the war. Wilson lost 359 men in the battle, while Forrest lost over 2,700 casualties, mostly prisoners and 32 artillery pieces.

Jubilant Union troops looted the city that night. Wilson's men spent the next week destroying the arsenal and naval foundry. Finally, they left Selma and moved on to Montgomery and fought at Columbus on Easter Sunday, and finally marched to Macon, Georgia, when they learned of the war's end. On May 10, they captured Jefferson Davis in Irwinsville, Georgia.

== See also ==
- List of American Civil War battles
- List of battles 1801–1900
- Selma, Alabama in the American Civil War
- Troop engagements of the American Civil War, 1865
