= Lion Capital LLP =

British private equity firm

- Type: Private
- Industry: Private equity
- Predecessor: Hicks Muse Tate & Furst Europe (1999-2004)
- Founded: 2004; 22 years ago
- Headquarters: London, SW1; United Kingdom
- Products: Leveraged buyouts, Growth capital
- Total assets: €4.8 billion
- Number of employees: 65
- Website: lioncapital.com

Lion Capital LLP is a British private equity firm specialising in investments in the consumer sector. Previous and current consumer brands owned by Lion have included Weetabix, Jimmy Choo, Wagamama, Kettle Foods and AllSaints.

The firm is headquartered in London, England, and employs 30 investment executives across its London and Los Angeles offices.

The firm's principals have invested approximately €6 billion in more than 30 businesses and more than 100 consumer brands.

== History ==
The firm's predecessor was launched in 1998 as the European affiliate of American private equity firm Hicks Muse Tate & Furst (now HM Capital). Lyndon Lea and Robert Darwent separated the European affiliate from its ailing American parent, launching Lion Capital as an independent private equity firm. Lion Capital was founded in 2004 by Lyndon Lea, Robert Darwent and Neil Richardson with the goal of creating the leading investment firm focused on the consumer sector. In 2004, Lion Capital completed fundraising for its first private equity fund, Lion Capital Fund I, with commitments from institutional investors of €820 million. Over thirty institutions committed capital to Fund I.

In April 2007, Lion Capital established a North American presence, opening an office in New York. That same year, Lion Capital raised its second private equity fund, Lion Capital Fund II, with approximately €2.0 billion of investor commitments.

In 2010, Lion Capital formed its third private equity fund, Lion Capital Fund III, which ultimately included capital commitments of €1.5 billion.

In October 2012, the North American office was relocated from New York to Los Angeles.

In May 2016, it was announced that Javier Ferrán will replace Franz Humer as Chairman of Diageo as of 1 January 2017 In November 2018, Lion Capital and Serruya Private Equity teamed up to acquire the Global Franchise Group (Great American Cookies, Round Table Pizza, Marble Slab Creamery, Pretzelmaker, MaggieMoo's Ice Cream and Treatery, and Hot Dog on a Stick) from Levine Leichtman Capital Partners. In February 2019, Lion Capital acquired the DMC Group (needlecrafts manufacturers DMC, Wool and the Gang, Sirdar, Tilsatec) from BlueGem Capital. During the summer of 2019, Lion Capital reduced its participation in Authentic Brands Group to make room for BlackRock's majority-shareholding move.

== Activities ==
Lion Capital seeks to invest in mid and large-sized companies selling branded products, including apparel, accessories and luxury goods, food distribution and specialty retail. Lion Capital's directors have resisted diversification into other sectors, claiming that their strategy is to know more about less.

Lion Capital's team draws on its investing and operating expertise to identify consumer brands with growth potential and implement value creating strategies within these businesses, often through geographic expansion, category extension, product innovation or operating improvements. Lion Capital focuses on companies in Europe and North America.

On June 26, 2019, Chloe Sorvino, a reporter from Forbes magazine, reported that Lion Capital will invest $ 100 million in Gordon Ramsay Holdings Limited, to open 100 restaurants in the United States by the year 2024.

Lion Capital's portfolio has included some of the world's best known consumer brands:

Brand	Year acquisition (or year of investment)	Partner	Price for acquisition (or amount of the investment)	Year sold	Price sold
Weetabix Limited	2004		£640 million	2012	£720 million (60% sold to Bright Food)
Jimmy Choo Ltd	2004		£100 million	2007	£225 million
Materne (Materne, Confipote, Pom’Potes)	2004			2006	
Wagamama	2005		£102 million	2011	£215 million
Orangina-Schweppes	2006	The Blackstone Group		2009	€2.6 billion
Kettle Foods	2006		$270 million	2010	$615 million
HEMA (store)	2007		€1.3 billion (estimation)	2018	(undisclosed)
FoodVest (Findus and Young's Seafood)	2008		£1.1 billion		
A.S.Adventure Group	2008		€263 million		
Russkiy Alkogol	2008	Central European Distribution Corporation			
American Apparel	2009		$80 million (investment)		
Bumble Bee Foods	2010		$980 million		
Picard Surgelés	2010		€1.5 billion		
AllSaints	2011				
Alain Afflelou	2012		€740 million		
John Varvatos	2012				
Good Hair Day (GHD)	2013		£300 million	2016	£420 million
Pittarosso	2014		£295 million		
Spence Diamonds	2015				
Loungers	2016		£137 million		
Great American Cookies	2018	Serruya Private Equity			
Round Table Pizza	2018	Serruya Private Equity			
Marble Slab Creamery	2018	Serruya Private Equity			
Pretzelmaker	2018	Serruya Private Equity			
MaggieMoo's Ice Cream and Treatery	2018	Serruya Private Equity			
Hot Dog on a Stick	2018	Serruya Private Equity			

== See also ==
- Lyndon Lea
- Hicks Muse Tate & Furst
