= Lafayette Square Mall =

Defunct shopping mall in Indianapolis, Indiana, U.S.

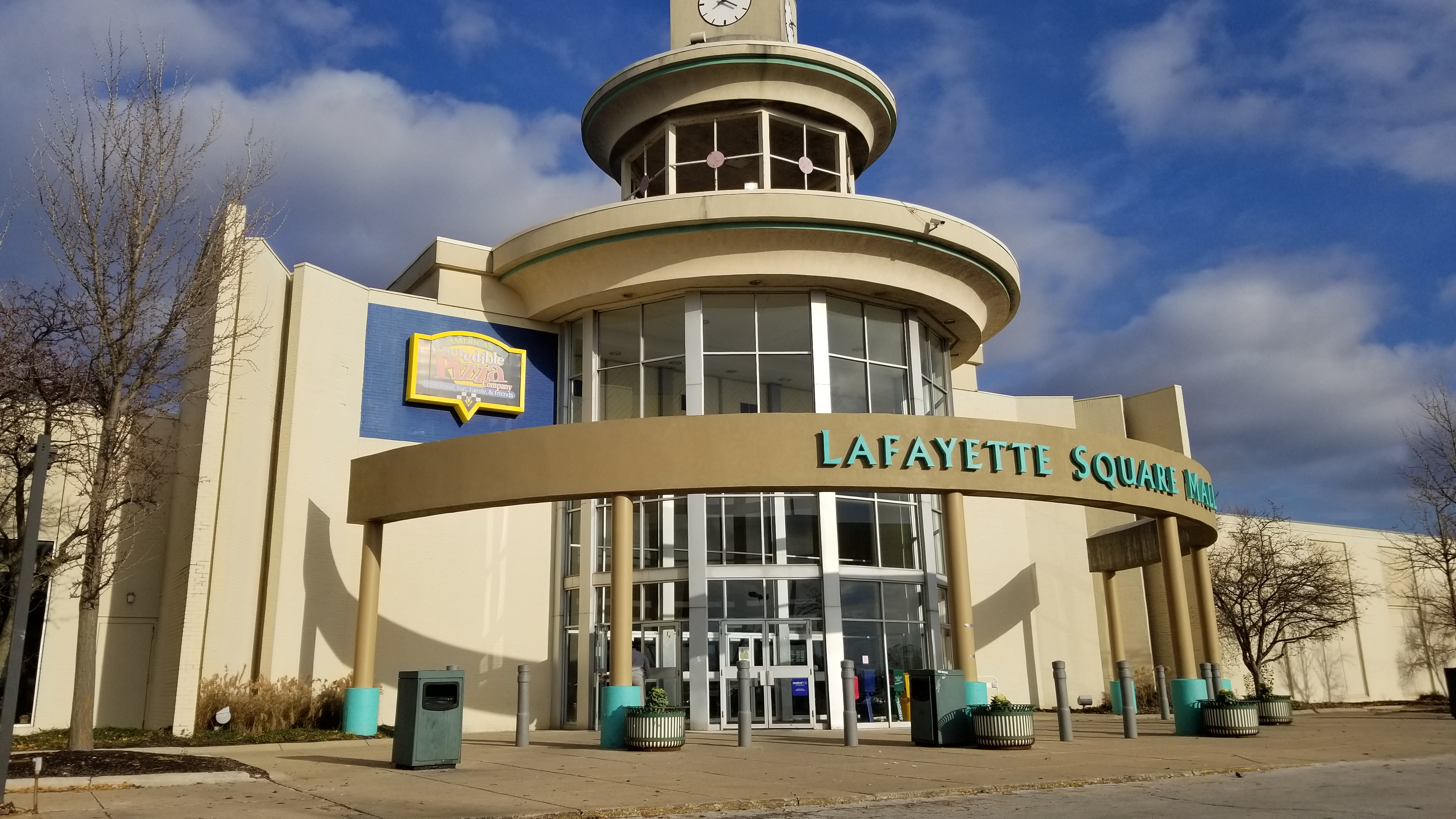
- Entrance to Lafayette Square Mall, 2018
- Location: Indianapolis, Indiana, United States
- Coordinates: 39°49′40″N 86°13′58″W
- Opened: August 1, 1968; 58 years ago
- Closed: August 29, 2022; 4 years ago
- Developer: Edward J. DeBartolo Corporation
- Owner: Sojos Capital
- Num. of anchor tenants: 4 (at peak)
- Floors: 1 (2 in former Sears, former Macy's, and former JCPenney)
- Parking: surface parking
- Public transit: 37, 38

Lafayette Square Mall was an enclosed shopping mall in Indianapolis, Indiana, United States. Developed in 1968 by Edward J. DeBartolo Sr., the mall is locally owned by Sojos Capital Group. The anchor store is Shoppers World. There are three vacant anchor stores that were once Sears, Macy's, and JCPenney.

== History ==
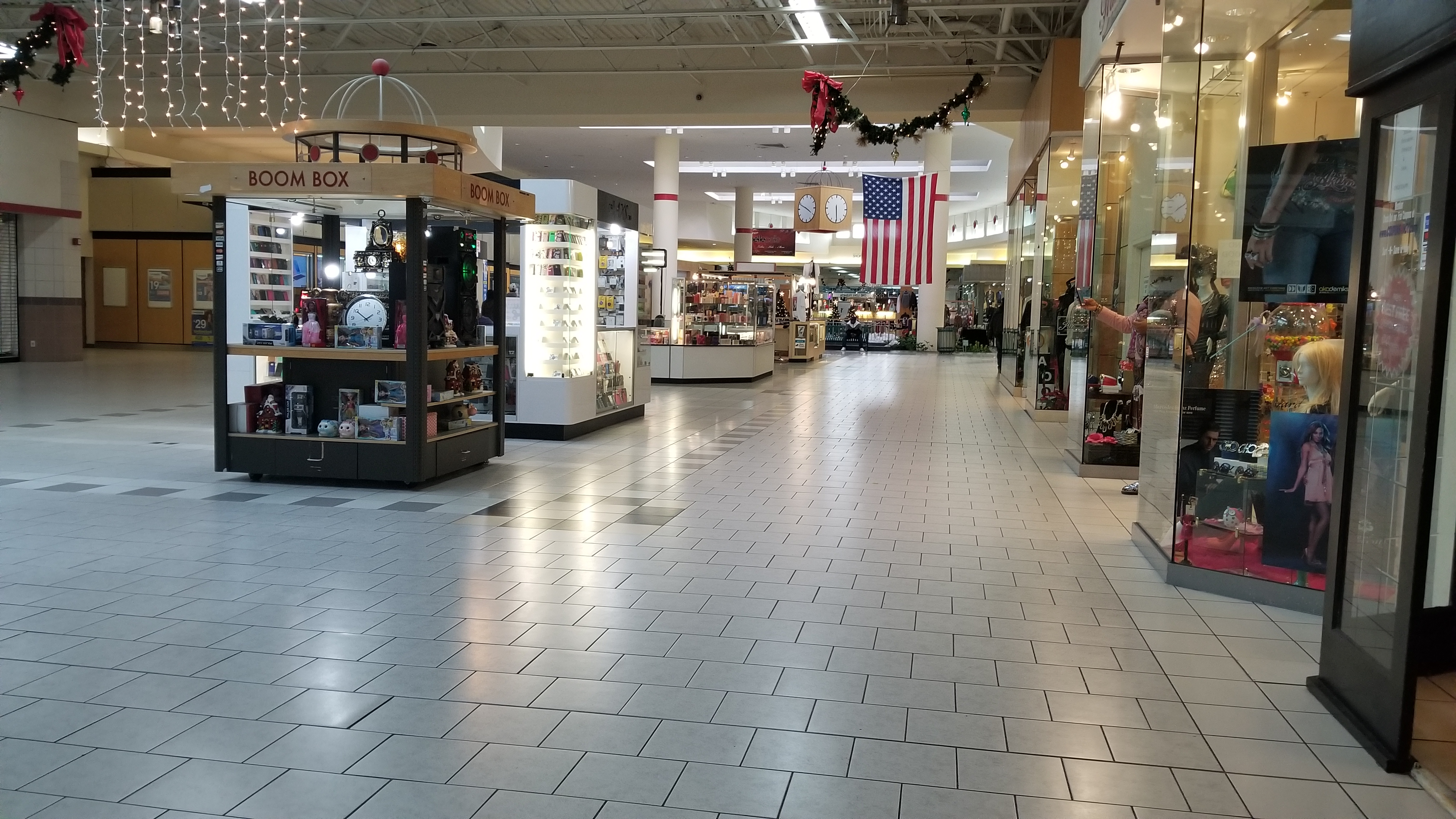
A mall concourse in 2018.

This mall was built by Edward J. DeBartolo Sr., and opened on August 1, 1968, as the Indiana's largest shopping mall. The mall was located at 38th Street and Lafayette Road in Pike Township, just two miles (3.2 km) north of the Indianapolis Motor Speedway. It was the first enclosed shopping mall in greater Indianapolis.

Upon completion, Lafayette Square featured 90 inline tenants, a single-screen General Cinema movie theatre, and over 1 million square feet of retail space located on an 80-acre (32 ha) site. Originally, there were five anchor stores built: JCPenney in the south end, Sears on the north end, G.C. Murphy in the north wing near Sears, a Kroger grocery store in the south wing near Penney's, and William H. Block at center court (opened in 1969).

An expansion in 1974 saw a sixth department store added near Sears. This wing added Ohio-based Lazarus that opened on August 8, 1974, as well as about eight new stores including Radio Shack. In 1975, the Kroger store connected to the mall was demolished to make way for another expansion that included its replacement, Indianapolis-based L. S. Ayres, on the south end near JCPenney.

The success at Lafayette Square prompted DeBartolo to plan two additional malls on opposite sides of town. Ground was broken on the northeast side of Indianapolis for what was to become Castleton Square, which opened in 1972. Washington Square Mall, on the east side of Indianapolis, opened in 1974.

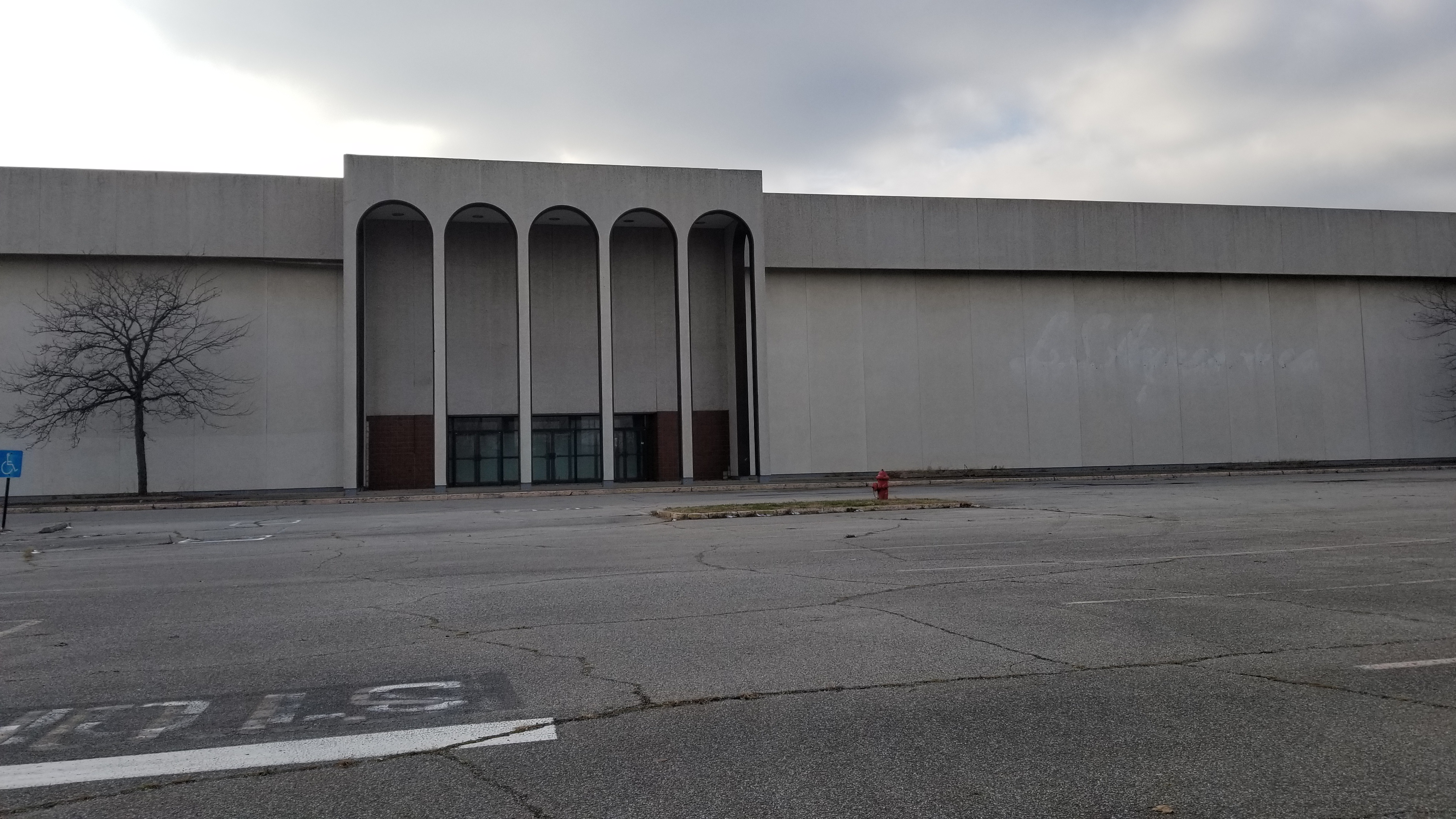
Former L.S. Ayres/Macy's Store. Closed 2009.

Around 1987, Lazarus bought William H. Block and the Block store was converted to a Lazarus while the original Lazarus became Montgomery Ward. In 1993, the G.C. Murphy five-and-dime closed.

Facing competition from new malls such as Circle Centre (opened in 1995), the mall needed a remodel. DeBartolo's company had merged with Circle Centre's operator, the locally based Simon Property Group, and they remodeled the aging mall in 1998, adding a racetrack-themed food court in the former G.C. Murphy. Montgomery Ward liquidated in whole in 2001, with Burlington Coat Factory taking over the first floor of that store.

Lazarus closed in 2002, and the space was converted into a temporary home for New Life Worship center.

In 2005, the lifestyle center known as Metropolis opened in the nearby suburb of Plainfield near the new entrance for Indianapolis International Airport, causing more withdrawals of stores from the mall once leases came up. JCPenney and Old Navy left the mall in 2005, precipitating a swift decline in the mall's fortunes. By 2006, many of the nationally known chains had begun to close at Lafayette Square and were replaced primarily by discount stores and local merchants on shorter-term leases. On September 9, 2006, the L. S. Ayres store was renamed Macy's due to the May/Federated merger.

Facing the mall's long decline and preferring to focus efforts on other malls in the Indianapolis area, Simon sold the mall to Ashkenazy Acquisitions Corp. in December 2007, a company which has since become infamous for their neglect of their properties. Some months later, the mall underwent a new remodel that included a rebuilt entrance, a Pretzelmaker/Maggie Moo's/Great American Cookie Co. kiosk, the east-coast chain Shopper's World (described as being between JCPenney and Value City in price point) located in the former JCPenney, and an entertainment facility called Xscape featuring a variety of games. In October 2008 and January 2009 respectively, Sears and Macy's announced they would both close despite the new renovations.

XScape was later replaced by America's Incredible Pizza company in the summer of 2010. In late 2010, Bath & Body Works, Victoria's Secret, and Andrews Jewelers all closed. In early 2011, the Pretzelmaker/Maggie Moo's/Great American Cookie Co. kiosk closed, along with Radio Shack and GameStop.

In the first quarter of 2012, Claire's, The Children's Place, and America's Incredible Pizza Company closed, leaving Burlington Coat Factory and Shoppers World as the mall's two remaining anchors. America's Incredible Pizza announced that they would close, effective March 19, 2012. By November 2012, the last remaining original tenant, GNC, had closed, leaving the mall with mainly local stores.

On August 12, 2019, the Burlington Coat Factory at Lafayette Square permanently closed, leaving only six national tenants, mostly athletic wear stores; Finish Line, Foot Locker, Champs Sports, Jimmy Jazz, Shoppers World, and Rainbow. Shoppers World shifted into the Burlington space in 2021.

In 2021, locally owned Sojos Capital fully acquired the mall. In November 2021, the company announced its multi-million dollar plans to create a mixed-use landmark destination development known as Window to the World. Plans also include multiple surrounding properties within the area focused on dining, music, art, shopping, housing, office, youth education, sports, entertainment, infrastructure improvements and public safety. The mall closed on August 29, 2022. In 2024, they unveiled plans for a redevelopment of the site.

== See also ==
- Economy of Indianapolis
- List of shopping malls in the United States
