= Nestlé Toll House Café =

Former cafe chain in the US and Canada

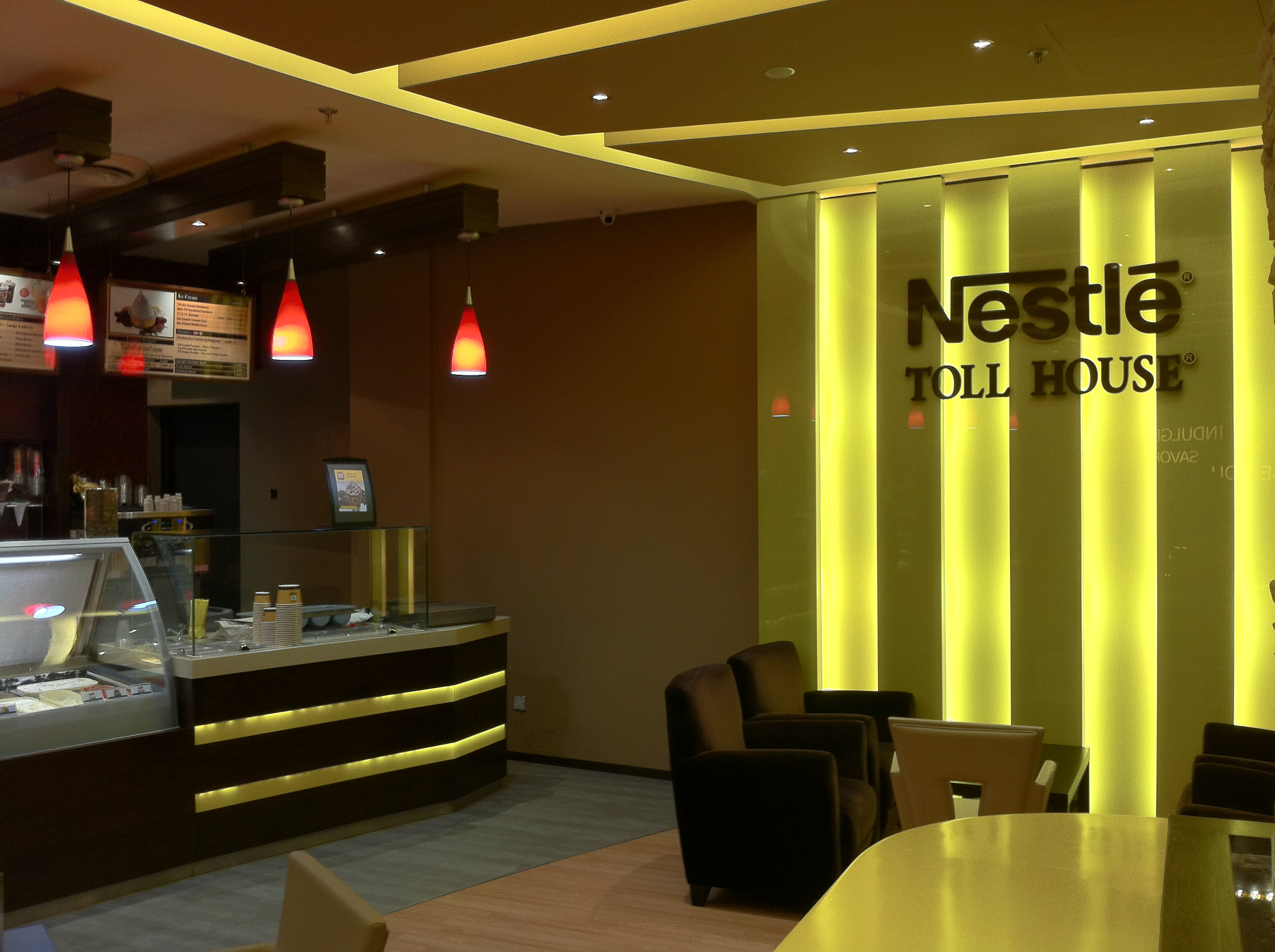
- Nestlé Toll House Café in Kuwait
- Founded: 2000; 26 years ago Frisco, Texas, U.S.
- Defunct: 2022
- Fate: Converted into Great American Cookies
- Products: Coffee, desserts, cookies
- Owner: Nestlé
- Website: nestle.com/tollhouse

Nestlé Toll House Café was a franchise in the United States and Canada founded by Ziad Dalal and his partner Doyle Liesenfelt. The two started Crest Foods, Inc. D/B/A "Nestlé Toll House Café by Chip" in 2000 in Dallas, Texas. Crest Foods, the master franchisor for Nestlé, was in charge of developing cookie store franchises across the United States as part of Nestlé USA's challenge to the longtime industry leader, Mrs. Fields Famous Cookies Inc. The menu consisted of items such as cookies, cookie cakes, brownies, ice cream, milkshakes, smoothies, and a full line of hot and frozen coffee beverages. Nestlé Toll House Cafés were commonly found in shopping malls or shopping centers.

The company and its COO Shawnon Bellah were featured on reality TV series Undercover Boss in 2015.

In May 2022, it was announced Nestlé Toll House Café has been acquired by the California-headquartered restaurant franchising company, FAT Brands for an undisclosed sum. It was also later confirmed that all Nestlé Toll House Café locations would be converted into Great American Cookies locations by the end of 2022.

On January 26, 2026, parent company FAT Brands filed for Chapter 11 bankruptcy protection in an effort to shed billions of dollars in debt. The company listed assets and liabilities between $1 billion and $10 billion.
