= OHG Brands =

American multi-brand restaurant operator

OHG Brands Inc.
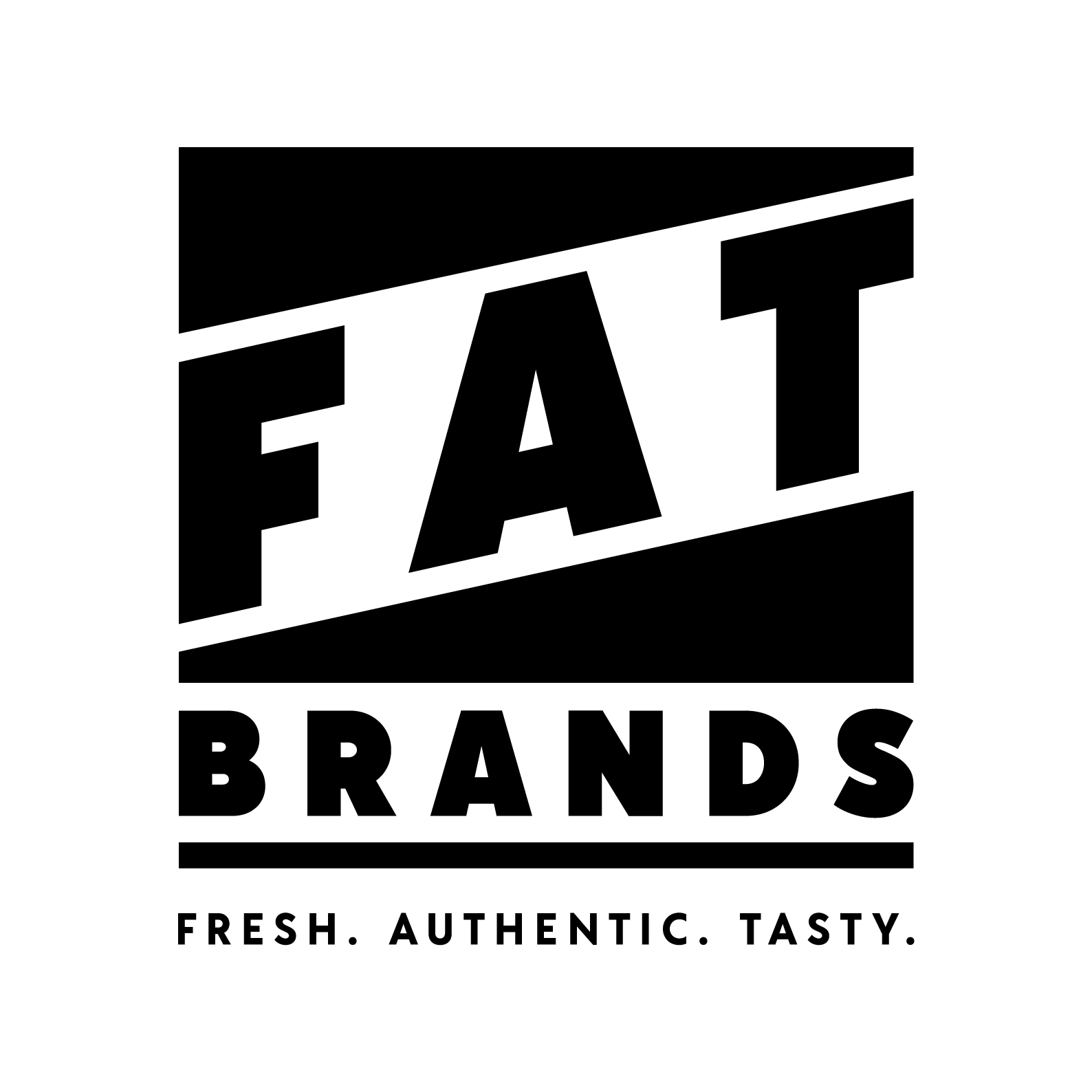
- Type: Public
- Traded as: Nasdaq: FAT
- Industry: Restaurants
- Founded: 2017; 9 years ago
- Fate: Bankruptcy, all assets sold; currently in process of winding down
- Headquarters: Beverly Hills, California, United States
- Key people: Ken Kuick (Co-CEO); Andy Wiederhorn (Co-CEO); Thayer D. Wiederhorn (COO)
- Revenue: ▲US$1.8 billion (est. 2025)
- Operating income: ▲US$123.12 million (est 2025)
- Net income: ▲US$227.15 million (est 2025)
- Total assets: ▲US$2.87 billion (est 2025)
- Total equity: ▲US$2.33 billion (est 2025)
- Number of employees: 18,350 (January 2025)
- Website: ohgbrands.com

OHG Brands Inc. (formerly known as FAT Brands Inc.) is an American multi-brand restaurant and sports bar franchise operator headquartered in Beverly Hills, California.

== History ==
FAT Brands began as a holding company for Fatburger in 2017, gaining a chairman in Ed Rensi. On August 13, 2020, Johnny Rockets was acquired by FAT Brands for $25 million.

In July 2021, FAT purchased Global Franchise Group, now owning Round Table Pizza, Hot Dog on a Stick, Great American Cookies, Pretzelmaker and Marble Slab Creamery. On September 1, 2021, FAT Brands announced that it would acquire Twin Peaks, for $300 million. The acquisition was completed on October 1.

In May 2022, it was announced FAT Brands had acquired the franchised chain, Nestlé Toll House Café for an undisclosed sum, and plans to convert all 86 locations to Great American Cookies locations.

In September, 2023 FAT purchased Smokey Bones from Sun Capital Partners for $30 million.

=== Financial difficulties and bankruptcy ===
In 2024, Andrew Wiederhorn, ex-CEO, current controlling shareholder, and Chairman of the Board of FAT Brands, was indicted on federal criminal charges, accused of taking $47 million in shareholder loans for his personal benefit which were then never paid back, also concealing millions of dollars in reportable compensation and taxable income from the Internal Revenue Service. Former CFO Rebecca D. Hershinger was also accused of assisting Wiederhorn in the scheme. The Board of Directors was never informed about the "loans", Fat Brands never disclosed them as related party transactions to investors, and they were written off after the company merged with its largest shareholder, Fog Cutter Capital Group (also majority-owned by Wiederhorn), in 2020. The U.S. Securities and Exchange Commission and the U.S. Attorneys Office for California had previously opened investigations into the company and Wiederhorn in 2021, and Wiederhorn had resigned as CEO in 2023 as a result of the investigation, later restructuring the Board of Directors with members under his control.

On November 21, 2025, FAT brands filed an 8-K with the SEC and reported debts of approximately $1.6 billion, due immediately, which could result in the company seeking to reorganize through bankruptcy proceedings.

On January 26, 2026, FAT Brands filed for Chapter 11 bankruptcy protection in an effort to shed billions of dollars in debt. The company listed assets and liabilities between $1 billion and $10 billion. By January 28, it was reported that 14 Smokey Bones, 2 Johnny Rockets, and all five remaining Yalla Mediterranean locations had permanently closed. That same day, the company accused Wiederhorn of misappropriating cash for lenders in exchange for funding vacations, jewelry and private jets, stating that the company made nearly $200 million in "improper payments" prior to its bankruptcy filing.

On February 4, FAT Brands was delisted from the Nasdaq stock exchange and began trading over-the-counter. On February 9, lenders asked a bankruptcy judge to temporarily suspend Wiederhorn as his position as CEO, claiming that he directed a sale of Twin Hospitality's stock without notifying bondholders or seeking prior court approval. Twin Hospitality sold 9 million shares to White Lion Capital for $3.1 million on January 30. On February 18, 352 Capital sued FAT Brands, claiming that FAT Brands used management fees and other cash to allow them to go through their restructuring procedure.

On March 16, FAT Brands announced that they were actively seeking a buyer for the sale of its assets, with an auction set for April 2026 and plans for the process to close by the end of May 2026. The bidding process included restrictions against Wiederhorn, restricting him from evaluating bids, private information regarding the bids, advising the company on the sale process, and communicating with any bidder. On March 18, Wiederhorn stepped down as CEO after a bankruptcy judge ruled in favor of the company's lenders to remove his position as CEO of the company.

On April 9, a bankruptcy judge approved FAT Brands to provide $1.9 million in bonuses to 114 employees that were deemed "crucial" to the company's operation. On April 24, a Texas Great American Cookies franchisee sued FAT Brands, arguing that they cannot shuffle them off to another owner without paying millions in alleged damages. On April 28, FAT Brands permanently closed all remaining Smokey Bones locations.

On April 30, FAT Brands identified several buyers for several of its brands. Twin Peaks would be sold to Summit Twin Hospitality I, LLC via a credit bid for an undisclosed amount, Hot Dog on a Stick would be sold to Amazing Brands, LLC for $8 million, and Elevation Burger would be sold to TABCo International Food Catering K.S.C.C. for $2.5 million, with plans for further expansion in the Middle East. The remaining brands, Fatburger, Round Table Pizza, Marble Slab, Johnny Rockets, Hurricane Grill & Wings, Great American Cookies, Ponderosa, Bonanza, Buffalo's Cafe, Pretzelmaker, Yalla, Native Grill & Wings, and Fazoli's, would be sold to FBG Bid Co., with court approval set for May 8. No buyers were identified for MaggieMoo's, Nestlé Toll House Café and Smokey Bones.

On May 5, creditors of FAT Brands sued investors in an effort to pause a credit bid sale of the company to its debtor-in-possession lender, claiming that it ignores claims worth $195 million. On May 14, FAT Brands sued Insight Capital and Gold Cap, LLC, amongst 10 unnamed individuals, arguing that they are connected to a refinancing before they filed for bankruptcy that caused one of its brands, Hot Dog on a Stick, to be flooded with heavy debt loads.

On May 17, FAT Brands reached an agreement with lenders and creditors to settle multiple disputes that would allow for the company to move forward with the sale of its assets. The company would also receive $8 million in financing to wind down once its assets are sold. After receiving court approval for the sale of its assets, FBG Bid Co. officially acquired the remaining assets from FAT Brands for $595 million on June 18, 2026. FBG Bid Co. rebranded itself to OHG Brands in September 2026.

== Brands ==
Before transferring its assets to new owners in 2026, the company owned the following chains:

- Buffalo's Café
- Elevation Burger
- Fatburger
- Fazoli's
- Great American Cookies
- Hot Dog on a Stick
- Hurricane Grill & Wings
- Johnny Rockets
- MaggieMoo's Ice Cream and Treatery
- Marble Slab Creamery
- Native Grill & Wings
- Nestlé Toll House Café
- Ponderosa and Bonanza Steakhouses
- Pretzelmaker
- Round Table Pizza
- Smokey Bones
- Twin Peaks
- Yalla Mediterranean
