= Smokey Bones =

American casual dining restaurant chain

Barbeque Integrated Inc.
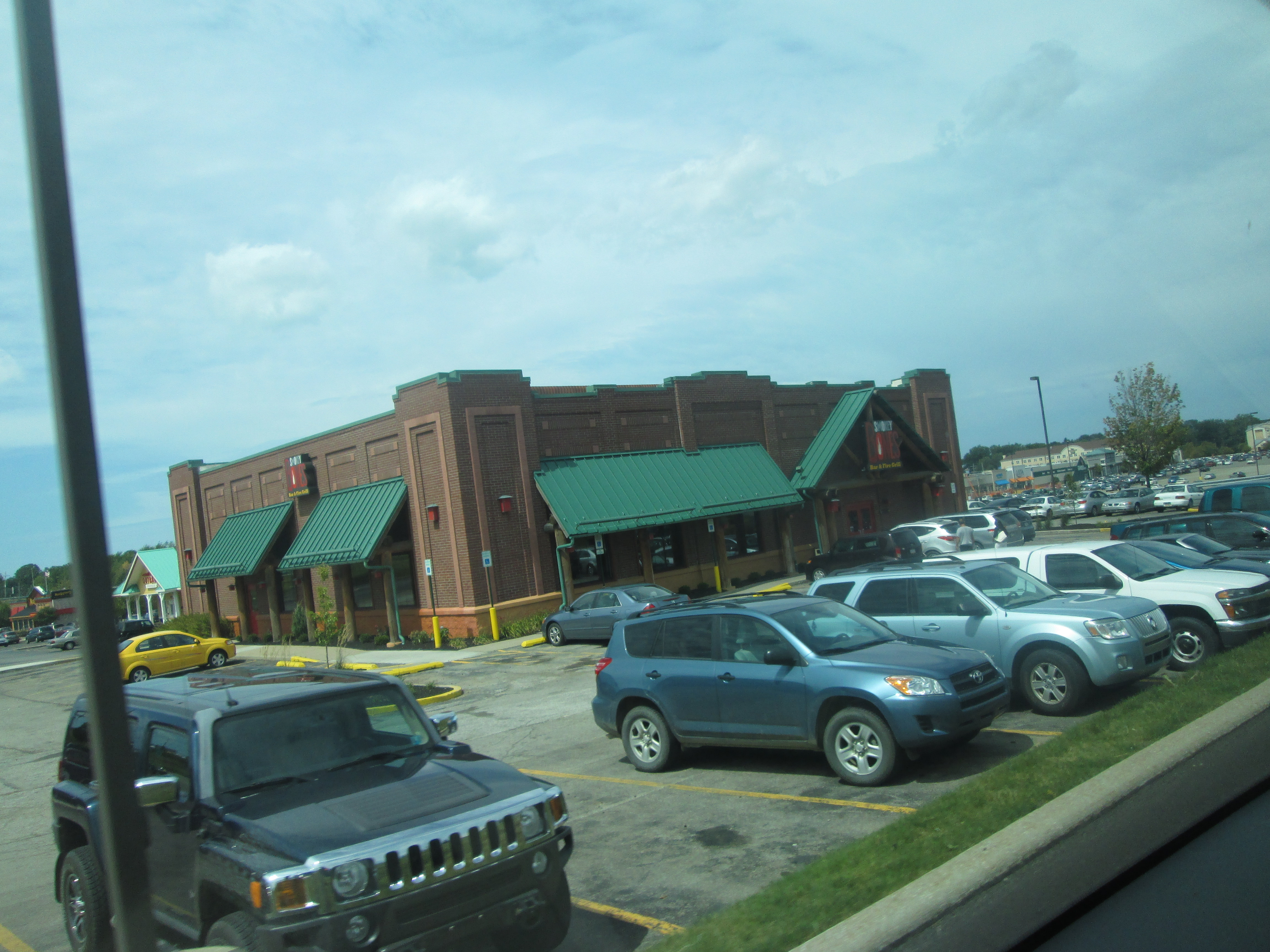
- A Smokey Bones restaurant in Erie, PA
- Trade name: Smokey Bones Bar & Fire Grill
- Type: Subsidiary
- Industry: Restaurant
- Genre: Casual dining
- Founded: August 1999; 27 years ago in Orlando, Florida
- Founder: Darden Restaurants
- Defunct: April 28, 2026
- Fate: Closed by parent company due to bankruptcy
- Headquarters: Beverly Hills, California, U.S.
- Number of locations: 31 (Prior to closing)
- Area served: United States
- Key people: Ken Kuick (Co-CEO); Rob Rosen (Co-CEO); Thayer D. Wiederhorn (COO)
- Number of employees: 3,700 (2015)
- Parent: Darden Restaurants (1999–2007); Sun Capital Partners (2007-2023); FAT Brands (2023-2026)
- Website: smokeybones.com

Barbeque Integrated Inc., doing business as Smokey Bones Bar and Fire Grill (or simply Smokey Bones) was an American casual dining restaurant chain owned by FAT Brands. Its franchise headquarters are in Beverly Hills, California. In January 2026, Smokey Bones had 31 restaurants in 15 Eastern states. Under its previous owner, Smokey Bones had as many as 128 restaurants across most of the United States. On April 28, 2026 Twin Hospitality closed all of its remaining Smokey Bones restaurants.

== History ==
In August 1999, Darden Restaurants, Inc. opened the first Smokey Bones restaurant in Orlando, Florida, at a site previously occupied by a Red Lobster and close to Darden's headquarters. By June 2001, Darden had opened eight additional Smokey Bones BBQ Sports Bar restaurants in Florida, the Midwest and Northeast.

On May 5, 2007, it was announced that Darden Restaurants was closing 56 Smokey Bones restaurants and planning to sell the remaining 73 in its struggling chain. The closings occurred in 22 states, primarily across the southwest and north-central United States.

In December 2007, Darden sold Smokey Bones to Barbeque Integrated Inc., a subsidiary of Sun Capital, for approximately $80 million.

On August 4, 2015, Ryan Esko was named CEO of Smokey Bones. Esko was replaced by James O’Reilly in 2019.

During 2022, Smokey Bones opened two new concept locations, One of which being a location that closed in May of 2007 by Darden.

On September 25, 2023, FAT Brands acquired Barbeque Integrated Inc. from Sun Capital Partners for $30 million.

On June 28, 2025, it was reported that up to 30 Smokey Bones locations would rebrand into the Twin Peaks name, while nine locations deemed underperforming will permanently close. Once the transitions are complete, Smokey Bones will be down to roughly 20 remaining locations.

On January 12, 2026, 14 locations closed with no notice to employees or the public. Following onto January 26, 2026, parent company FAT Brands filed for Chapter 11 bankruptcy protection in an effort to shed billions of dollars in debt. The company listed assets and liabilities between $1 billion and $10 billion.

On April 28, 2026 Twin Hospitality closed all of its remaining Smokey Bones restaurants.

== See also ==
- List of barbecue restaurants
