= Debbi Fields =

American entrepreneur and author

- Born: Debra Jane Sivyer; September 18, 1956 (age 70); Oakland, California, U.S.
- Occupations: Businesswoman, author
- Known for: Founder of Mrs. Fields

Debbi Fields (née Debra Jane Sivyer; born September 18, 1956) is an American businesswoman and author who is the founder of Mrs. Fields Bakeries. Initially one of the original ball girls in major league baseball, she used her pay to refine her cookie recipes. She has written several cookbooks. Mrs. Fields Cookies currently operates in over 250 locations.

== Early life and education ==
Debra Jane Sivyer was born in Oakland, California. Her father worked as a welder for the Navy, while her mother was a housewife. She is the youngest of five daughters.

In the 1970s, the Oakland Athletics introduced "ball girls" (young girls who would sit in foul territory near the baselines to retrieve baseballs grounded foul by batters) to the team. Sivyer, with the help of a sister who was then a secretary at the A's offices, was one of the first ones hired. She was paid five dollars an hour and would use the money to buy ingredients for what would become her famous cookies. Additionally, she instituted a "milk-and-cookies" break for the umpires.

In 1974, Sivyer graduated from Alameda High School, California at the age of 17. Additionally, she was also voted homecoming queen her senior year. She attended Foothill College, a community college located in Los Altos Hills, California, for two years.

== Career ==
Fields began her business in 1977 in Palo Alto, California, and at its height franchised 650 retail bakeries in the United States and over 80 in 11 different countries.

Fields began franchising in 1990, and, though she sold the business to an investment group in the early 1990s, she remains the company's spokesperson.

A resident of Memphis, Tennessee for over 16 years since she remarried in 1997, she moved to Nashville in 2014.

== Personal life ==
In 1976, at the age of 19, Sivyer married Randall Keith Fields, a 29-year-old Stanford graduate who founded the financial and economic consulting firm Fields Investment Group in the early 1970s. Subsequently, she adopted the name she would soon use for her business. Fields and Randall had five daughters named Jessica, Jenessa, Jennifer, Ashley, and McKenzie. They divorced in 1997.

On November 29, 1997, she married Michael Rose, the former CEO/Chairman of Holiday Corporation and Harrah's Entertainment, Inc. One of her five stepchildren from their marriage, Gabrielle Rose, swam for Brazil at the 1996 Summer Olympics. Michael Rose died of cancer on April 2, 2017, at the age of 75.

== In media ==
"Cookie Fortunes", the sixth episode of the third season of The History Channel series The Food That Built America depicts the founding of Mrs. Fields Cookies. In the episode, Fields is played by Rebecca Gomberg.
