= Spence Diamonds =

Canadian retailer of diamond jewellery

- Type: Private
- Industry: Retail
- Founded: 1978; 48 years ago
- Headquarters: Vancouver, British Columbia,
- Number of locations: 8
- Key people: Eric Lindberg (Executive Chairman)
- Products: Diamond jewellery
- Owner: Lion Capital LLP
- Website: spencediamonds.com

Spence Diamonds is a Canadian retailer of diamond jewellery owned by the British firm Lion Capital. As of September 2021, the chain operated eight locations across three Canadian provinces.

== History ==
Spence Diamonds was founded in Vancouver in 1978 by Doug Spence and was run for decades by Sean Jones. The company began selling synthetic diamonds in 2016. It is also noted for its aggressive radio advertising presence featuring Jones portraying a "clownish," screaming character. According to the Harvard Business Press, as of 2012 it was the most profitable diamond retailer in Canada.

In April 2015, Lion Capital acquired Spence Diamonds in a $125 million deal.

The company made several attempts to enter the U.S. market, acquiring stores in Minneapolis in the 1990s and three former Robbins Brothers locations in Houston in 2009, but all were eventually closed in early 2011. In 2018, it announced plans to expand to over 40 North American locations, but after opening several U.S. stores, it ceased American operations again in late 2020 due to the COVID-19 pandemic.

Spence Diamonds was the subject of a CBC News investigation in 2013, alleging false advertising and citing that the company received the most Better Business Bureau complaints out of diamond retailers in British Columbia. In response, the company changed its warranty policy.

In July 2025, TriWest Capital Partners purchased a majority stake in Spence Diamonds.
