= Team Rensi Motorsports =

Former NASCAR team

- Owner(s): Ronnie Russell; Ed Rensi; Gary Weisbaum
- Base: Concord, North Carolina
- Series: Xfinity Series
- Manufacturer: Ford Motor Company

Career
- Debut: 1999 Textilease / Medique 300
- Latest race: 2011 O'Reilly Auto Parts 300
- Races competed: 434
- Drivers' Championships: 0
- Race victories: 5
- Pole positions: 2

Team Rensi Motorsports was a NASCAR Nationwide Series team owned by Ronnie Russell, Ed Rensi, Gary Weisbaum, and formerly Sam Rensi. The team has also competed in the Winston Cup Series, Craftsman Truck Series, and ARCA racing series.

Ed Rensi, who was president and CEO of McDonald's USA from 1991 to 1997, has been Team Rensi Racing's Chairman and CEO since October 1998.

== Car No. 24 history ==
Jason Keller (2005)

The No. 24 team debuted in 2005 as the No. 35 being driven by veteran Jason Keller with sponsorship from McDonald's. Despite a ninth-place finish in points, Keller struggled to run up front, and he left for Phoenix Racing at the end of the season.

Regan Smith (2006)

Regan Smith took Keller's place in 2006, and had one top-ten finish. At the conclusion of the season, Smith departed from the ride for Ginn Racing.

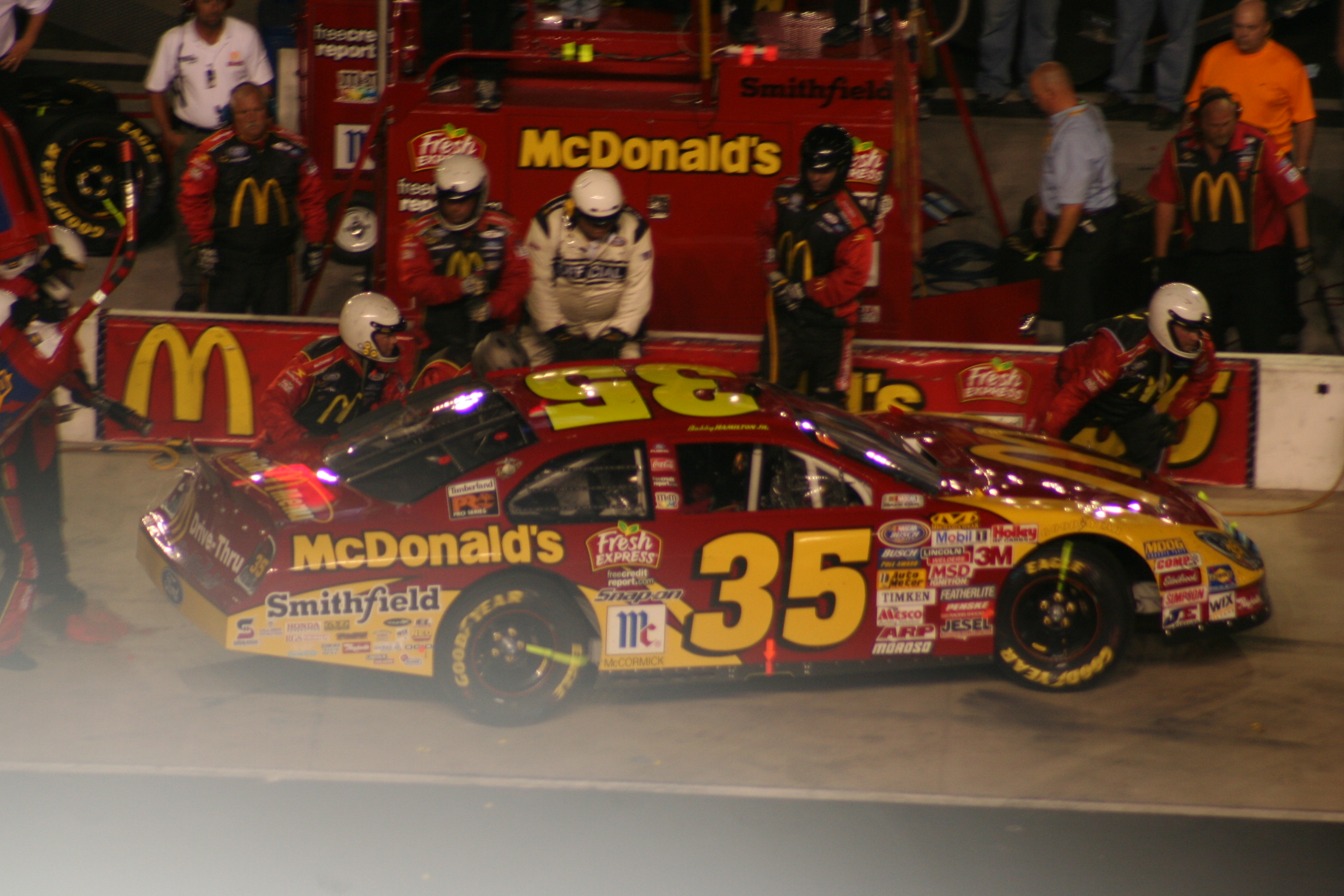
The 35 car at Bristol Motor Speedway in 2007.

Bobby Hamilton Jr. (2007)

Hamilton Jr. returned to Rensi to drive the No. 35 for the 2007 season, finishing sixth in points. During the 2007–08 offseason, McDonald's ended its sponsorship of the No. 35 and David Gilliland took the FreeCreditReport.com sponsorship of the No. 25 car to the NASCAR Sprint Cup Series. Team Rensi signed Smithfield Foods as prime sponsor of the No. 25 car, allowing Hamilton to move to that team. The 35 returned late in 2008 with Danny O'Quinn driving, but he failed to finish both races he ran.

Eric McClure (2009–2010)

The car made a return to full-time racing in 2009, with Eric McClure bringing both Hefty sponsorship and the No. 24 over from Front Row Motorsports.

In 2010, McClure and Hefty remained with the team. After surgery on his foot, McClure was relieved by driver Chris Cook at Road America. D. J. Kennington raced the car at Montreal to an 11th-place finish, as McClure sat out of the race due to a concussion the prior week from Bristol. McClure and Hefty will leave the team for 2011, citing performance issues and a lacking budget from Team Rensi.

Kevin Lepage (2011)

For 2011, Kevin Lepage drove the car for the first several races of the season. Lepage ran full races initially, but was forced to withdraw from Bristol after a practice crash and did not arrive at Talladega. They were last seen at Texas.

=== Car No. 24 results ===
Year	Driver	No.	Make	1	2	3	4	5	6	7	8	9	10	11	12	13	14	15	16	17	18	19	20	21	22	23	24	25	26	27	28	29	30	31	32	33	34	35	Owners	Pts
2003	Elliott Sadler	35	Ford	DAY	CAR	LVS	DAR	BRI	TEX	TAL	NSH	CAL	RCH	GTY	NZH	CLT	DOV	NSH	KEN	MLW	DAY	CHI	NHA	PPR	IRP	MCH	BRI	DAR	RCH	DOV	KAN	CLT	MEM	ATL	PHO	CAR	HOM; 36		106th	55
2004	Johnny Borneman III	35	Ford	DAY	CAR	LVS	DAR	BRI	TEX	NSH	TAL	CAL; DNQ	GTY	RCH	NZH	CLT	DOV	NSH; 30	KEN	MLW	DAY	CHI	NHA	PPR															48th	980
2004	Shelby Howard	35	Ford																						IRP; 24	MCH; DNQ	BRI		RCH; 25	DOV; 31			MEM; 36	ATL; 18					48th	980
2004	Wally Dallenbach Jr.	35	Ford																									CAL; 20			KAN; 10	CLT; 40			PHO; 24	DAR	HOM; 29		48th	980
2005	Jason Keller	35	Ford	DAY; 35	CAL; 17	MXC; 13	LVS; 43	ATL; 17	NSH; 8	BRI; 19	TEX; 13	PHO; 21	TAL; 8	DAR; 13	RCH; 11	CLT; 23	DOV; 7	NSH; 11	KEN; 31	MLW; 13	DAY; 17	CHI; 22	NHA; 21	PPR; 36	GTY; 33	IRP; 4	GLN; 18	MCH; 15	BRI; 12	CAL; 6	RCH; 38	DOV; 13	KAN; 18	CLT; 18	MEM; 10	TEX; 13	PHO; 16	HOM; 15	12th	3866
2006	Regan Smith	35	Ford	DAY; 26	CAL; 28	MXC; 25	LVS; 22	ATL; 21	BRI; 38	TEX; 34	NSH; 13	PHO; 27	TAL; 37	RCH; 21	DAR; 19	CLT; 10	DOV; 39	NSH; 35	KEN; 16	MLW; 22	DAY; 15	CHI; 28	NHA; 35	MAR; 14	GTY; 23	IRP; 11	GLN; 23	MCH; 31	BRI; 19	CAL; 28	RCH; 26	DOV; 17	KAN; 19	CLT; 37	MEM; 21	TEX; 20	PHO; 19	HOM; 31	29th	3136
2007	Bobby Hamilton Jr.	35	Ford	DAY; 24	CAL; 29	MXC; 17	LVS; 14	ATL; 24	BRI; 18	NSH; 9	TEX; 14	PHO; 34	TAL; 12	RCH; 22	DAR; 20	CLT; 33	DOV; 10	NSH; 13	KEN; 36	MLW; 13	NHA; 20	DAY; 12	CHI; 29	GTY; 13	IRP; 13	CGV; 24	GLN; 22	MCH; 27	BRI; 12	CAL; 21	RCH; 16	DOV; 12	KAN; 20	CLT; 16	MEM; 38	TEX; 14	PHO; 24	HOM; 8	15th	3149
2008	Danny O'Quinn Jr.	35	Ford	DAY	CAL	LVS	ATL	BRI	NSH	TEX	PHO	MXC	TAL	RCH	DAR	CLT	DOV	NSH	KEN	MLW	NHA	DAY	CHI	GTY	IRP	CGV	GLN	MCH	BRI	CAL	RCH	DOV	KAN	CLT; 40	MEM; 42	TEX; 42	PHO; 43	HOM; DNQ	70th	139
2009	Eric McClure	24	Ford	DAY; 26	CAL; 30	LVS; 16	BRI; 26	TEX; 34	NSH; 26	PHO; 22	TAL; 25	RCH; 39	DAR; 28	CLT; 19	DOV; 23	NSH; 22	KEN; 30		NHA; 33	DAY; 28	CHI; 31	GTY; 23	IRP; 23	IOW; 20	GLN; 30	MCH; 28	BRI; 25	CGV; 22	ATL; 26	RCH; 29	DOV; 24	KAN; 25	CAL; 28	CLT; 18	MEM; 30	TEX; 19	PHO; 28	HOM; 28	26th	2962
2009	Eric McClure	24	Chevy															MLW; 32																					26th	2962
2010	Eric McClure	24	Ford	DAY; 17	CAL; 35	LVS; 21	BRI; 24	NSH; 29	PHO; 27	TEX; 28	TAL; 22	RCH; 31	DAR; 27	DOV; 24	CLT; 29	NSH; 26	KEN; 29	ROA; 27	NHA; 29	DAY; 36	CHI; 29	GTY; 26	IRP; 26	IOW; DNQ	GLN; 31	MCH; 30	BRI; DNQ		ATL; 30	RCH; 30	DOV; 29	KAN; 33	CAL; DNQ	CLT; 23	GTY; DNQ	TEX; 26	PHO; DNQ	HOM; 37	33rd	2491
2010	D. J. Kennington	24	Ford																									CGV; 11											33rd	2491
2011	Kevin Lepage	24	Ford	DAY; 41	PHO; 37	LVS; 37	BRI; Wth	CAL; 28	TEX; 39	TAL	NSH	RCH	DAR	DOV	IOW	CLT	CHI	MCH	ROA	DAY	KEN	NHA	NSH	IRP	IOW	GLN	CGV	BRI	ATL	RCH	CHI	DOV	KAN	CLT	TEX	PHO	HOM		63rd	39

== Car No. 25 history ==
Early years (1999–2000)

The team, then known as Team Rensi Motorsports first joined the Busch Series in 1999, fielding the No. 25 Dura Lube Chevrolet Monte Carlo for Jeff Finley. They finished 13th at the season opening NAPA Auto Parts 300, but Finley failed to qualify for the next few races, and he and the team drifted apart. Kenny Wallace took over at Nashville, and drove 18 races that season for the team, posting nine finishes of seventh or better. Rick Fuller, David Blankenship and Scott Lagasse drove two races a piece for the team as well, and they finished eighteenth in owner's points that season. Wallace returned again in 2000 with new sponsor Lance Snacks, and posted eight top-ten finishes, his best finish was 4th twice at Bristol races. Blankenship and Andy Santerre drove in the races that Wallace did not run, with Santerre finishing 3rd at Pikes Peak.

Chad Chaffin (2001)

In 2001, the U.S. Marines signed on as sponsor. Since Wallace had moved onto Innovative Motorsports, Chad Chaffin began the year with the team, but after he couldn't finish higher than 16th at Atlanta, he was released. Rookie David Donohue took over at the Pepsi 300 Presented by Mapco/Williams, but he too, struggled in the ride, and was released after 12 starts. Randy Tolsma finished the season for the team, who finished 29th in points that year.

Bobby Hamilton Jr. (2002–2004)

After 2001, Rensi switched to Ford Tauruses and signed Bobby Hamilton Jr. to drive. After a slow start, the two began to gain momentum, and they picked up their first win at the Busch 200, and finished eighth in points. This success carried over into the next season as well, as Hamilton won four races and finished fourth in points. They would not be able to win in 2004, and after the Cabela's 250, Hamilton left to drive for PPI Motorsports at the Nextel Cup level, and Mike McLaughlin took over for the rest of the season, finishing second at the Stacker 200 Presented by YJ Stinger.

Ashton Lewis (2005–2006)

In 2005, Rensi signed Ashton Lewis to drive the 25 car. Lewis had five top-ten finishes and a fourteenth-place finish in points. After many poor performances, however, Lewis was released and the Marines left as a sponsor.

David Gilliland and Richard Johns (2007)

For 2007, credit report site FreeCreditReport.com signed on as sponsor, with Nextel Cup driver David Gilliland and head engineer Richard Johns originally slated to share the ride. During the RoadLoans.com 200 weekend, Gilliland announced his departure from the No. 25, citing that he needed to focus on his Yates Racing No. 38 Cup ride. Johns drove for the remainder of the season.

Bobby Hamilton Jr. (2008)

The team returned Hamilton to the ride for the 2008 season in the newly renamed Nationwide Series, as his No. 35 team had folded. Smithfield Foods served as the sponsor for 30 races, and Hamilton drove to a fifteenth-place points finish with two top-ten finishes. Boris Said drove the 25 for two road course races with No Fear sponsorship.

Part-time (2009–2011)

The No. 25 returned for one race in 2009, at IRP with Hamilton Jr. driving.

In 2010, the No. 25 raced at Richmond and Charlotte with Kelly Bires behind the wheel and Raybestos as the sponsor.

For 2011, the No. 25 team, with driver Kelly Bires, qualified for the Daytona race, but lack of funding caused them to start and park, only completing a few laps.

The last time they were seen at a racetrack was at Michigan which was going to be the Nationwide debut for Chad Finley. Unfortunately, Finley crashed the car in practice and the team did not have a backup, so they were forced to withdraw.

=== Car No. 25 results ===
Year	Driver	No.	Make	1	2	3	4	5	6	7	8	9	10	11	12	13	14	15	16	17	18	19	20	21	22	23	24	25	26	27	28	29	30	31	32	33	34	35	Owners	Pts
1999	Jeff Finley	25	Chevy	DAY; 13	CAR; DNQ	LVS; DNQ	ATL; DNQ	DAR; DNQ																															18th	2766
1999	Kenny Wallace	25	Chevy						TEX; DNQ	NSV; 26	BRI; 6			NHA; 22	RCH; 7		CLT; 15	DOV; 13			MLW; 17	MYB; 21		GTY; 27		MCH; 38	BRI; 6	DAR; 6	RCH; 4	DOV; 6	CLT; 27	CAR; 7	MEM; DNQ	PHO; 5	HOM; 19				18th	2766
1999	Stevie Reeves	25	Chevy									TAL; DNQ	CAL; DNQ																										18th	2766
1999	Rick Fuller	25	Chevy													NZH; 26																							18th	2766
1999	David Blankenship	25	Chevy																SBO; 29				PPR; 43																18th	2766
1999	Scott Lagasse	25	Chevy																	GLN; 14																			18th	2766
1999	Ron Hornaday Jr.	25	Chevy																						IRP; 39														18th	2766
2000	Kenny Wallace	25	Chevy	DAY; 6	CAR; 6		ATL; 41	DAR; 31	BRI; 4			TAL; 11		RCH; DNQ		CLT; 41								GTY; 8			BRI; 4	DAR; 11	RCH; 6		CLT; 11	CAR; 9		PHO; 7					9th	3516
2000	Andy Santerre	25	Chevy			LVS; 30				TEX; 20	NSV; 15		CAL; 21		NHA; 6		DOV; 39	SBO; 10	MYB; 19	GLN; 27	MLW; 14	NZH; 23	PPR; 3		IRP; 10								MEM; 32						9th	3516
2000	Ricky Craven	25	Chevy																							MCH; 24													9th	3516
2000	Randy Tolsma	25	Chevy																											DOV; 27									9th	3516
2000	Chad Chaffin	25	Chevy																																HOM; 26				9th	3516
2001	Chad Chaffin	25	Chevy	DAY; 41	CAR; 22	LVS; 25	ATL; 16	DAR; 37	BRI; 34	TEX; 27																													29th	2603
2001	David Donohue	25	Chevy								NSH; 32	TAL; 33	CAL; 27	RCH; 36	NHA; 33	NZH; 27	CLT; 20	DOV; 32	KEN; 32	MLW; 21	GLN; 15	CHI; 34																	29th	2603
2001	Andy Houston	25	Chevy																				GTY; 17																29th	2603
2001	Randy Tolsma	25	Chevy																					PPR; 23	IRP; 33	MCH; 33	BRI; 22	DAR; 29	RCH; 38	DOV; 26	KAN; 40	CLT; 25	MEM; 18	PHO; 25	CAR; 31				29th	2603
2001	Jay Sauter	25	Chevy																																	HOM; 22			29th	2603
2002	Bobby Hamilton Jr.	25	Ford	DAY; 30	CAR; 16	LVS; 11	DAR; 12	BRI; 13	TEX; 8	NSH; 3	TAL; 22	CAL; 37	RCH; 25*	NHA; 1*	NZH; 6	CLT; 7	DOV; 3	NSH; 2	KEN; 36	MLW; 7	DAY; 33	CHI; 9	GTY; 17	PPR; 12	IRP; 31	MCH; 5	BRI; 32	DAR; 6	RCH; 14	DOV; 30	KAN; 8	CLT; 9	MEM; 37	ATL; 8	CAR; 29	PHO; 24	HOM; 5		9th	4058
2003	Bobby Hamilton Jr.	25	Ford	DAY; 7	CAR; 13	LVS; 34	DAR; 12	BRI; 6	TEX; 40	TAL; 35	NSH; 10*	CAL; 18	RCH; 10	GTY; 5	NZH; 9	CLT; 13	DOV; 6	NSH; 5	KEN; 1*	MLW; 10	DAY; 22	CHI; 1*	NHA; 6	PPR; 25	IRP; 35	MCH; 3	BRI; 34	DAR; 4	RCH; 3	DOV; 2	KAN; 19	CLT; 7	MEM; 1	ATL; 3	PHO; 1*	CAR; 3	HOM; 3		5th	4588
2004	Bobby Hamilton Jr.	25	Ford	DAY; 13	CAR; 8	LVS; 5	DAR; 19	BRI; 24	TEX; 5	NSH; 27	TAL; 24	CAL; 10	GTY; 4	RCH; 4	NZH; 2*	CLT; 13	DOV; 4	NSH; 23	KEN; 28*	MLW; 5	DAY; 12	CHI; 43	NHA; 9	PPR; 10	IRP; 6	MCH; 29													11th	4036
2004	Mike McLaughlin	25	Ford																								BRI; 12	CAL; 11	RCH; 24	DOV; 2	KAN; 11	CLT; 12	MEM; 18	ATL; 41	PHO; 36	DAR; 39	HOM; 16		11th	4036
2005	Ashton Lewis	25	Ford	DAY; 13	CAL; 11	MXC; 9	LVS; 22	ATL; 14	NSH; 19	BRI; 8	TEX; 32	PHO; 17	TAL; 4	DAR; 14	RCH; 16	CLT; 10	DOV; 14	NSH; 25	KEN; 25	MLW; 18	DAY; 26	CHI; 11	NHA; 28	PPR; 15	GTY; 36	IRP; 15	GLN; 31	MCH; 26	BRI; 31	CAL; 31	RCH; 30	DOV; 14	KAN; 28	CLT; 8	MEM; 31	TEX; 21	PHO; 21	HOM; 43	18th	3587
2006	Ashton Lewis	25	Ford	DAY; 12	CAL; 29	MXC; 13	LVS; 13	ATL; 17	BRI; 30	TEX; 38	NSH; 11	PHO; 20	TAL; 33	RCH; 26	DAR; 20	CLT; 28	DOV; 42	NSH; 9	KEN; 5	MLW; 16	DAY; 17	CHI; 35	NHA; 24	MAR; 27	GTY; 16	IRP; 22	GLN; 33	MCH; 39	BRI; 18	CAL; 5	RCH; 31	DOV; 25	KAN; 14	CLT; 11	MEM; 37	TEX; 25	PHO; 24	HOM; 20	22nd	3376
2007	David Gilliland	25	Ford	DAY; 20		MXC; 36	LVS; 32	ATL; 31	BRI; 35		TEX; 26	PHO; 16	TAL; 37	RCH; 20	DAR; 33	CLT; 27	DOV; 29				NHA; 19	DAY; 10	CHI; 27				GLN; 16	MCH; 29	BRI; 41	CAL; 18									30th	2502
2007	Kenny Wallace	25	Ford		CAL; 26																																		30th	2502
2007	Richard Johns	25	Ford							NSH; 34								NSH; 34	KEN; 28	MLW; 19				GTY; 31	IRP; 15	CGV; 25					RCH; 30	DOV; 28	KAN; 26	CLT; 27	MEM; 23	TEX; 34	PHO; 31	HOM; 35	30th	2502
2008	Bobby Hamilton Jr.	25	Ford	DAY; 22	CAL; 20	LVS; 12	ATL; 23	BRI; 17	NSH; 10	TEX; 23	PHO; 13		TAL; 3	RCH; 17	DAR; 30	CLT; 18	DOV; 14	NSH; 30	KEN; 21	MLW; 15	NHA; 16	DAY; 15	CHI; 19	GTY; 20	IRP; 14		GLN; 16	MCH; 18	BRI; 18	CAL; 19	RCH; 14	DOV; 15	KAN; 25	CLT; 37	MEM; 21	TEX; 16	PHO; 18	HOM; 21	18th	3779
2008	Boris Said	25	Ford									MXC; 35														CGV; 5													18th	3779
2009	Bobby Hamilton Jr.	25	Ford	DAY	CAL	LVS	BRI	TEX	NSH	PHO	TAL	RCH	DAR	CLT	DOV	NSH	KEN	MLW	NHA	DAY	CHI	GTY	IRP; 22	IOW	GLN	MCH	BRI	CGV	ATL	RCH	DOV	KAN	CAL	CLT	MEM	TEX	PHO	HOM	73rd	97
2010	Kelly Bires	25	Ford	DAY	CAL	LVS	BRI	NSH	PHO	TEX	TAL	RCH	DAR	DOV	CLT	NSH	KEN	ROA	NHA	DAY	CHI	GTY	IRP	IOW	GLN	MCH	BRI	CGV	ATL	RCH; 27	DOV	KAN	CAL	CLT; 21	GTY	TEX	PHO	HOM	63rd	179
2011	Kelly Bires	25	Ford	DAY; 43	PHO; 37	LVS; 35	BRI; 43	CAL	TEX	TAL	NSH	RCH	DAR	DOV	IOW	CLT	CHI																						68th	17
2011	Chad Finley	25	Ford															MCH; Wth	ROA	DAY	KEN	NHA	NSH	IRP	IOW	GLN	CGV	BRI	ATL	RCH	CHI	DOV	KAN	CLT	TEX	PHO	HOM		68th	17

== Craftsman Trucks ==
Team Rensi began fielding a Craftsman Truck team in 2000, after purchasing equipment from Dale Earnhardt, Inc. Driver Jimmy Hensley drove the mostly unsponsored No. 16 Chevrolet Silverado to a 13th-place finish in points. In 2001, Donohue began running the No. 16, but after three races, the team shut down due to sponsorship issues. Randy Tolsma drove the No. 61 that year and was tenth in points when his team closed as well due to financial problems. He ran one final Truck race for Rensi in 2002 (driven by Butch Miller), finishing 18th in a Marine-sponsored truck at Martinsville Speedway, the last race for Rensi's truck program.

=== Truck No. 16 results ===
Year	Driver	No.	Make	1	2	3	4	5	6	7	8	9	10	11	12	13	14	15	16	17	18	19	20	21	22	23	24	Owners	Pts
2000	Jimmy Hensley	16	Chevy	DAY; 29	HOM; 12	PHO; 15	MMR; 14	MAR; 10	PIR; 6	GTY; 2	MEM; 10	PPR; 11	EVG; 12	TEX; 12	KEN; 13	GLN; 14	MLW; 12	NHA; 27	NZH; 7	MCH; 12	IRP; 9	NSV; 29	CIC; 25	RCH; 13	DOV; 32	TEX; 4	CAL; 10	13th	2933
2001	David Donohue	16	Chevy	DAY; 28	HOM; 35	MMR; 21	MAR	GTY	DAR	PPR	DOV	TEX	MEM	MLW	KAN	KEN	NHA	IRP	NSH	CIC	NZH	RCH	SBO	TEX	LVS	PHO	CAL	53rd	375

=== Truck No. 61 results ===
Year	Driver	No.	Make	1	2	3	4	5	6	7	8	9	10	11	12	13	14	15	16	17	18	19	20	21	22	23	24	Owners	Pts
2000	Chad Chaffin	61	Chevy	DAY	HOM	PHO	MMR	MAR	PIR	GTY	MEM	PPR	EVG	TEX	KEN	GLN	MLW	NHA	NZH	MCH	IRP	NSV	CIC	RCH	DOV	TEX; 33	CAL	89th	64
2001	Randy Tolsma	61	Chevy	DAY; 5	HOM; 6	MMR; 10	MAR; 5	GTY; 11	DAR; 13	PPR; 28	DOV; 28	TEX; 8	MEM; 13	MLW; 30	KAN; 13	KEN; 8	NHA; 12	IRP; 19	NSH	CIC	NZH							21st	2166
2001	Vince Whitmire	61	Chevy																			RCH; 27	SBO; 30	TEX	LVS	PHO; 22		21st	2166
2001	Sammy Sanders	61	Chevy																								CAL; 36	21st	2166
2002	Butch Miller	61	Chevy	DAY; 17	DAR																							56th	221
2002	Randy Tolsma	61	Chevy			MAR; 18	GTY	PPR	DOV	TEX	MEM	MLW	KAN	KEN	NHA	MCH	IRP	NSH	RCH	TEX	SBO	LVS	CAL	PHO	HOM			56th	221
