= Mrs. Fields =

American food company specializing in cookies

Mrs. Fields Original Cookies Inc.
- Type: Private
- Founded: Palo Alto, California (August 16, 1977; 49 years ago)
- Founder: Debbi Fields
- Headquarters: Broomfield, Colorado, United States
- Number of locations: 90 locations in the United States and over 100 locations in 6 countries (2026)
- Key people: Dustin Lyman, CEO
- Products: Baked goods
- Owner: Z Capital Partners
- Number of employees: 4,000
- Subsidiaries: TCBY
- Website: MrsFields.com

Mrs. Fields' Original Cookies Inc. is an American franchisor in the snack food industry, with Mrs. Fields and TCBY as its core brands. Through its franchisees' retail stores, it is one of the largest retailers of freshly-baked-on-premises specialty cookies and brownies in the United States and the largest retailer of soft-serve frozen yogurt in the country. In addition, it operates a gifts and branded retail business, entering into many licensing arrangements. Its franchise systems include 90 locations throughout the United States and in 22 other countries. It also offers retail grocery products and a gifting catalog under the name of Mrs. Fields Gifts. It is headquartered in Broomfield, Colorado.

== History ==
Mrs. Fields Cookies was founded by Debbi Fields in the late 1970s. She and her husband Randy opened their first of many stores in 1977 in Palo Alto, California, selling homemade-style cookies which quickly grew in popularity. Stalls were located in many U.S. airports and shopping malls. In 1982, they moved their headquarters to Park City, Utah. In the early 1990s, the company was sold to an investment firm.

During the 1980s and 90s, the company acquired several other brands, including The Famous Chocolate Chip Cookie Company, The Original Cookie Company, Great American Cookies, Pretzel Time, Pretzelmaker, Hot Sam Pretzel Bakery, and TCBY. All Hot Sam’s stores were converted to Pretzel Time and Great American Cookies, Pretzel Time and Pretzelmaker were later sold to Nexcen Franchise Management leaving only Mrs. Fields’ Cookies and TCBY as the portfolios brands.

In 2007, Mrs. Fields celebrated its 30th anniversary with a national search for a new cookie. Chandler, Arizona, resident Carrie Lawrence's recipe for "Oatmeal Peanut Butter Scotchies" was chosen over 700 other recipe entries as Mrs. Fields' 30th Anniversary Cookie in August 2007.

In May 2012, Mrs. Fields announced it was moving its headquarters to the Denver area in Colorado. According to then CEO Tim Casey, the move was because "Many casual/quick service franchise companies were launched from and are based in Denver, making it an ideal environment for idea sharing."

The company acquired long-standing licensee Maxfield Candy and high-quality nut, dried fruit, and popcorn brand Nutty Guys in Salt Lake City, Utah, on December 24, 2014.

Mrs. Fields cookie wrapper obverse

== The chain letter recipe ==
In the mid-1980s, a recipe circulated through the mail that claimed to contain the secret recipe for Mrs. Fields chocolate chip cookies along with a story that it was purchased from one of the cookie stores for $250. However, it was fake and the story that accompanied it was adapted from an urban legend attached to recipes for cookies from Neiman Marcus and Waldorf-Astoria for red velvet cake.

In response to the chain letter, a sign attributed to Debbi was posted in Mrs. Fields stores:

Mrs. Fields recipe has never been sold. There is a rumor circulating that the recipe was sold to a woman at a cost of $250. A chocolate-chip cookie recipe was attached to the story. I would like to tell all my customers that this story is not true, this is not my recipe and I have not sold the recipe to anyone. Mrs. Fields recipe is a delicious trade secret.

== Financial history ==
In 2007, Nexcen Brands, Inc. purchased the Pretzel Time and Pretzelmaker brands from Mrs. Fields Famous Brands. Great American Cookies was then sold to Nexcen in February 2008. Mrs. Fields experienced layoffs due to restructuring caused by sale of these brands.

In 2008, Mrs. Fields attempted to restructure their debt to bondholders before filing for Chapter 11 protection.

Mrs. Fields avoided another bankruptcy in 2011 by agreeing to cede control of the company to its creditors, Z Capital Partners and Carlyle. Z Capital Partners became the sole owner of Mrs. Fields in 2013. Mrs. Fields promoted Neil Courtney from COO to CEO.
