= The Apple Pan =

Restaurant in Los Angeles, California, US

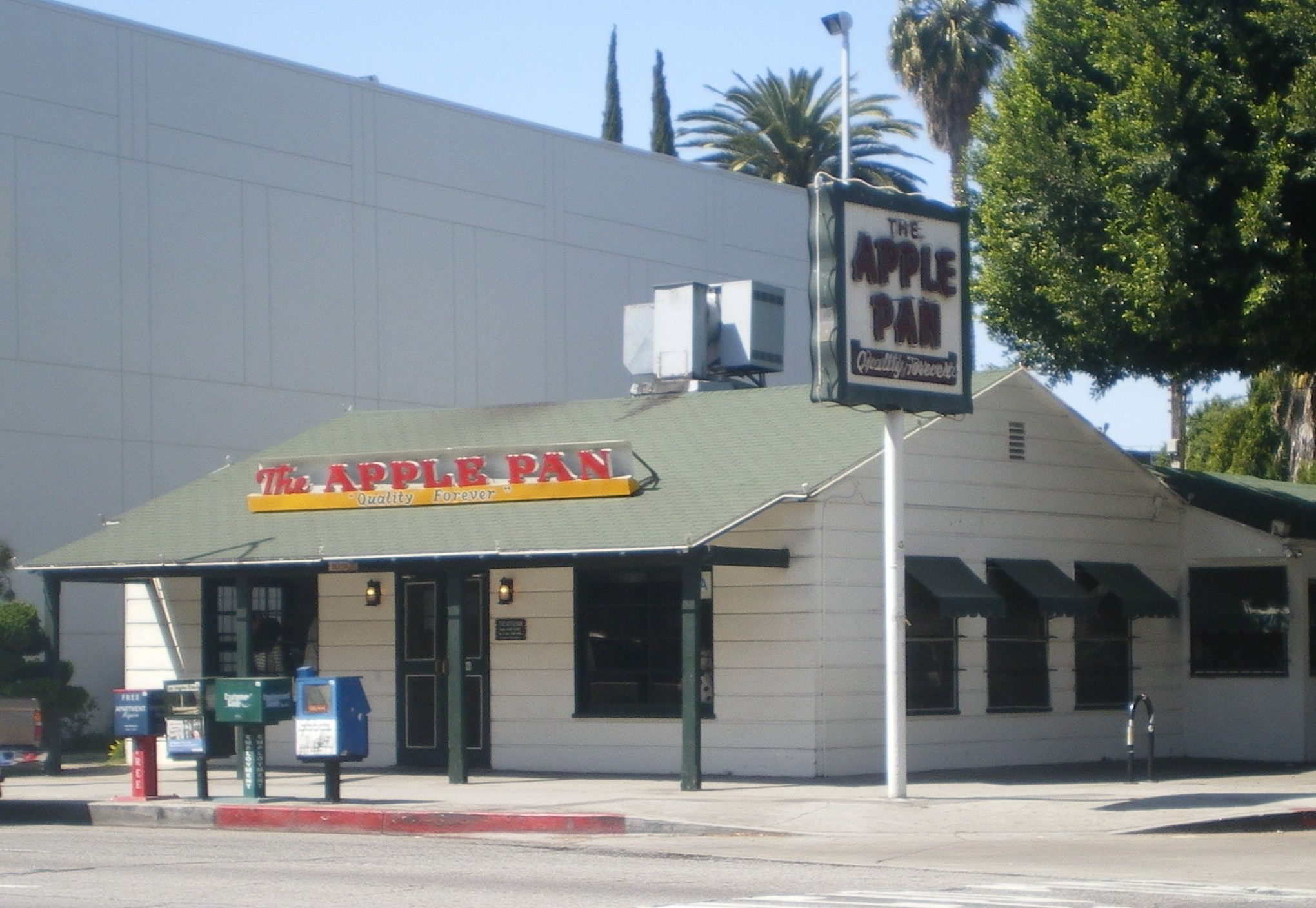
- The Apple Pan, 2008
- Interactive map of The Apple Pan

Restaurant information
- Established: April 11, 1947; 79 years ago
- Owners: Shelli Azoff; Irving Azoff
- Previous owners: Sunny Sherman; Martha Gamble
- Dress code: Casual
- Location: 10801 West Pico Boulevard, Los Angeles, California, 90064, United States
- Coordinates: 34°2′26.4″N 118°25′40.08″W
- Website: theapplepan.com

The Apple Pan is a restaurant in Los Angeles, opened in 1947, that is locally famous for its hamburgers, apple pies served with vanilla ice cream, and banana cream pie.

== History ==
The restaurant, opened in 1947, is one of Los Angeles' oldest continuously operating restaurants. It is located near the Westside Pavilion.

The Apple Pan is also notable as the basis for the popular Johnny Rockets restaurant chain. Johnny Rockets founder Ronn Teitelbaum claimed he used The Apple Pan as a model for his successful 1950s-themed franchise, copying the menu, presentation, counter seating and grilling area for the Johnny Rockets chain based on this original restaurant: a small menu with few items, hamburgers served wrapped in paper and on cardboard plates, hamburgers grilled-to-order in full view of the counter-seated customers. Teitelbaum approached the Baker family about going into business with him to establish a nation-wide franchise based on Apple Pan, but they turned him down, preferring things the way they were: simple.

The exterior of The Apple Pan was used as an establishing shot in episodes of 1990s teen drama, Beverly Hills, 90210. The show's executive producer Charles Rosin wanted to use the name of The Apple Pan but instead created the fictional Peach Pit, loosely based on The Apple Pan, after he and the diner's owners could not agree on the use of the name.

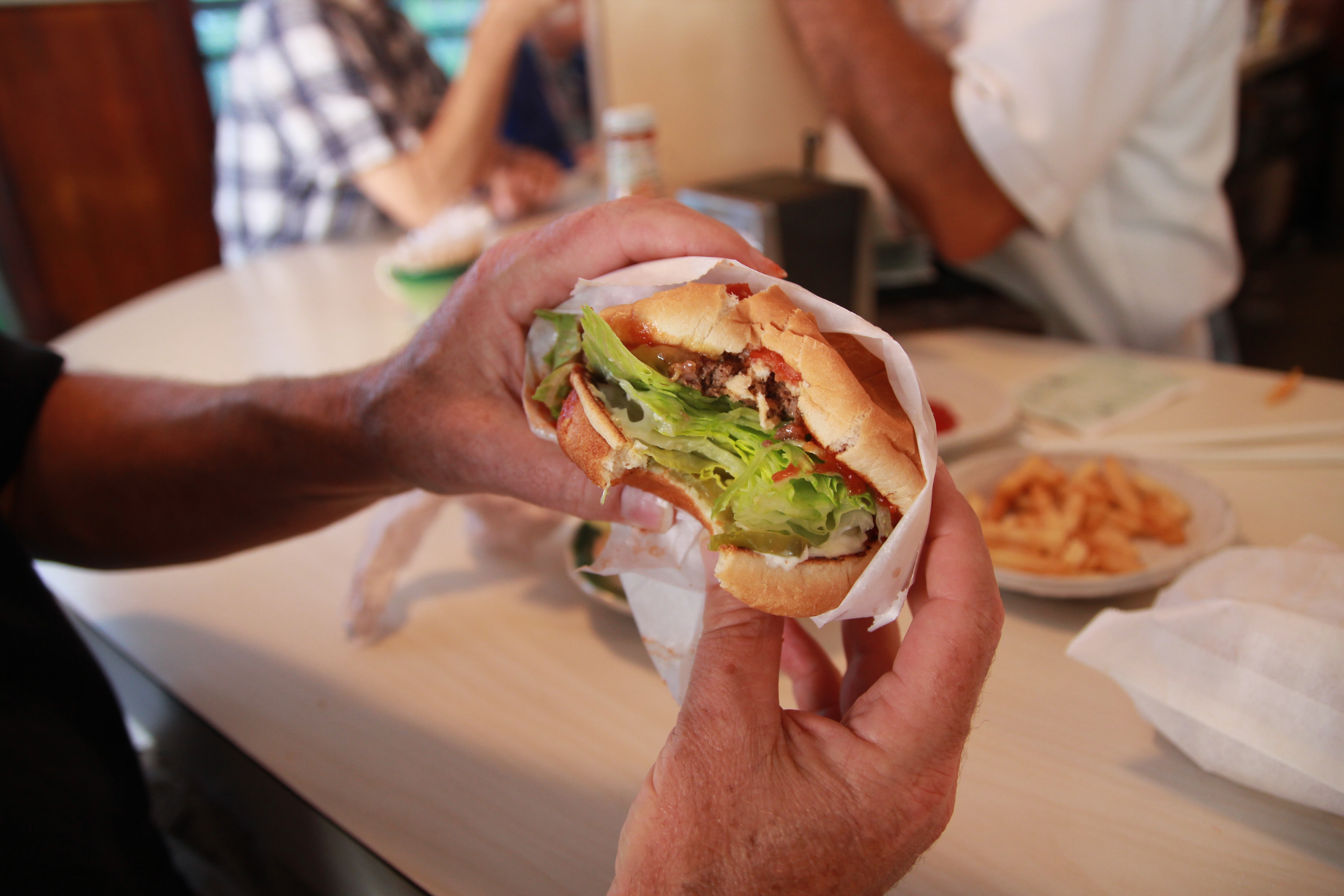
Hickory Burger

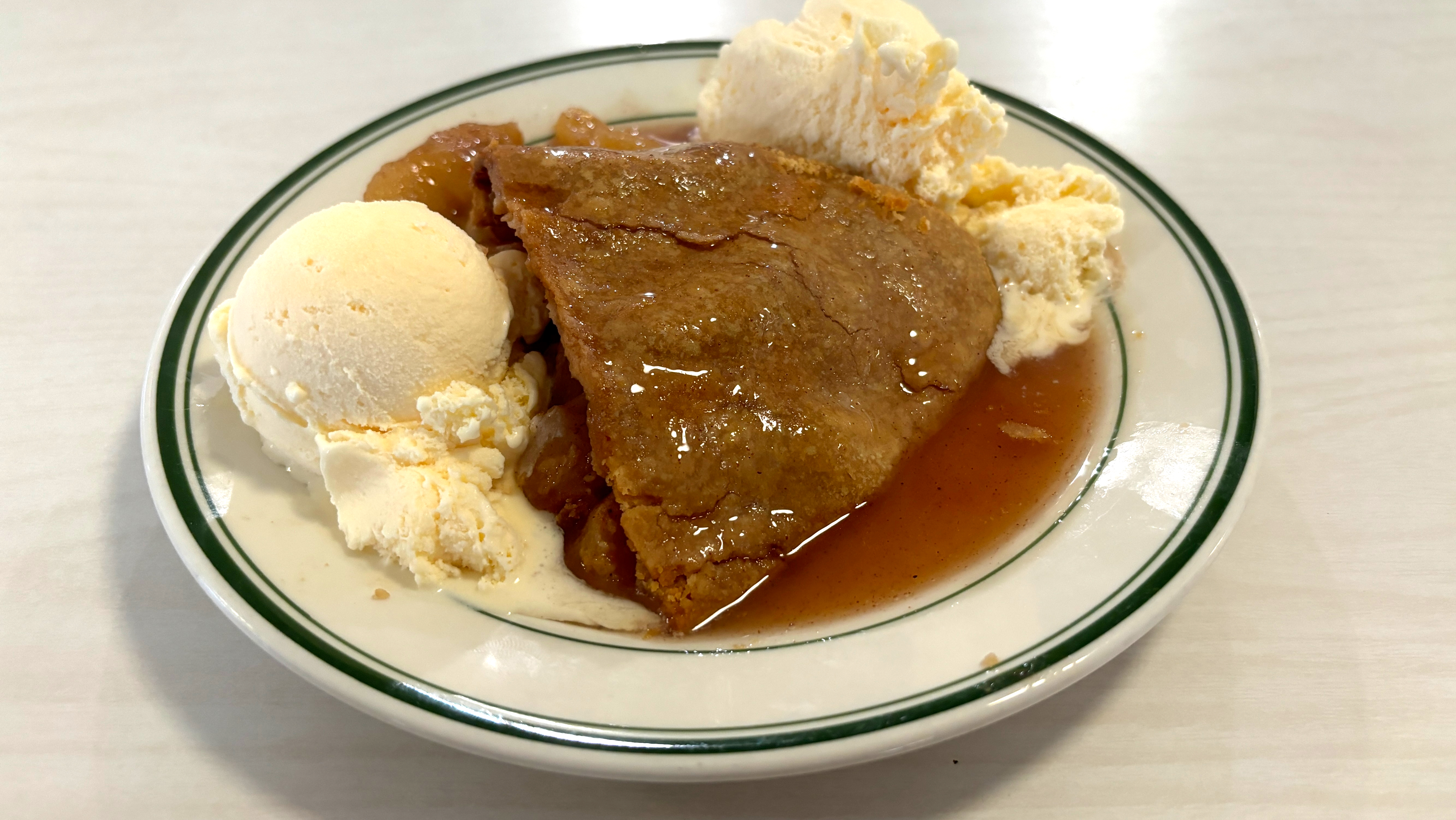
Apple pie

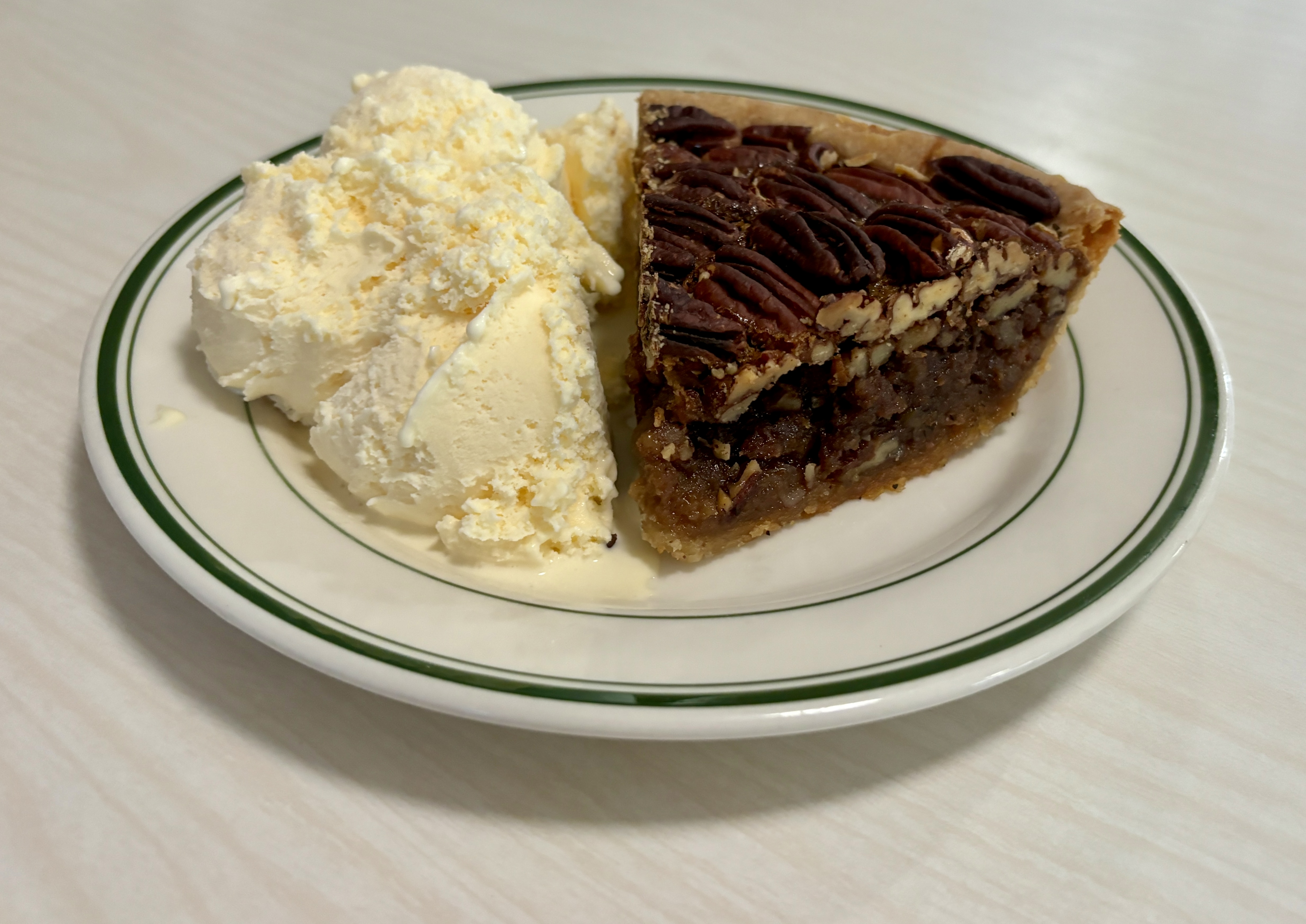
Pecan pie

== See also ==
- List of hamburger restaurants
