= Fazoli's =

Fast-casual Italian-American restaurant chain

Fazoli's System Management, LLC.

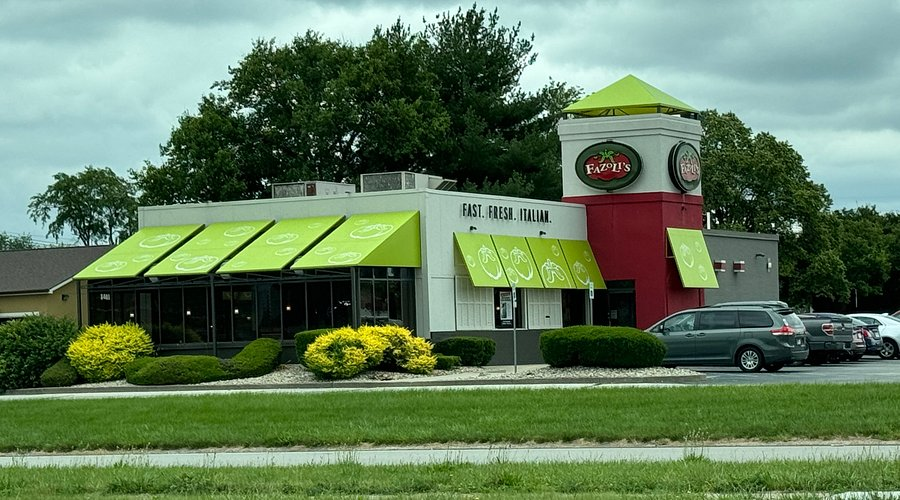
- Fazoli's in Indianapolis, Indiana (2024)
- Trade name: Fazoli's
- Type: Subsidiary
- Industry: Restaurants; Franchising
- Genre: Fast Casual
- Founded: 1988; 38 years ago as Gratzi's in Lexington, Kentucky
- Headquarters: Lexington, Kentucky, U.S.
- Number of locations: 136 in the U.S. as of November 2026
- Area served: United States, Canada, Puerto Rico
- Key people: Tim Kimmel – President
- Products: Italian-American cuisine
- Parent: Jerrico Inc. (1988–1990); Duskin Co / Seed Restaurant Group (1990–2006); Sun Capital Partners (2006–2015); Sentinel Capital Partners (2015–2021); FAT Brands (2021–2026); OHG Brands (2026–present)
- Website: fazolis.com

Fazoli's System Management, LLC., or Fazoli's is an American quick-service restaurant chain specializing in Italian-American cuisine. Founded in 1988 in Lexington, Kentucky, the company owns and franchises 136 locations across 24 states in the United States, with additional locations in Canada, and Puerto Rico. Its menu includes pasta dishes, sandwiches, pizza, salads, desserts, and breadsticks.

== History ==
=== Founding and early growth ===
Fazoli's originated in Lexington, Kentucky, in 1988 as a restaurant concept developed by Jerrico, Inc., then the parent company of Long John Silver's and several other restaurant chains. The first location opened in September 1988 under the name Gratzi's and was renamed Fazoli's in 1989.

In 1990, Seed Restaurant Group, led by former Jerrico executive Kunihide "Kuni" Toyoda, acquired the five existing Fazoli's restaurants. Under Toyoda's ownership, the chain expanded rapidly during the 1990s and early 2000s.

By 2006, Fazoli's had grown to 319 restaurants in 32 states.

=== Sun Capital and Sentinel Capital ownership ===
In 2006, Fazoli's was acquired by an affiliate of Sun Capital Partners. During Sun Capital's ownership, the company remodeled restaurants, revised its menu and made changes to its management and operating structure.

Sentinel Capital Partners acquired Fazoli's in July 2015. At the time, the chain operated 213 restaurants in 26 states, consisting of 124 company-operated restaurants and 89 franchised locations. The acquisition followed several years of same-store sales growth and a turnaround effort led by the company's management.

=== FAT Brands ownership ===
On November 2, 2021, FAT Brands announced an agreement to acquire Fazoli's from Sentinel Capital Partners for $130 million. The acquisition was completed on December 15, 2021. FAT Brands subsequently reported a total cash purchase price of approximately $137.1 million.

At the time of the acquisition, Fazoli's operated approximately 220 restaurants in 28 states.

=== 2026 restructuring and OHG Brands ===
FAT Brands filed for Chapter 11 bankruptcy protection in January 2026. During the bankruptcy proceedings, the company's restaurant assets were sold or transferred to several buyers. FBG Bid Co. acquired substantially all of the assets associated with Fazoli's and several other FAT Brands restaurant concepts in a transaction that closed in June 2026. In July 2026, a federal bankruptcy court approved FAT Brands' liquidation plan following the sale and transfer of its restaurant assets.

On September 30, 2026, FBG Bid Co. announced the formation of OHG Brands, a restaurant franchising company whose portfolio includes Fazoli's, Round Table Pizza, Fatburger, Johnny Rockets, Great American Cookies, Marble Slab Creamery, Pretzelmaker, Hurricane Grill & Wings, Native Grill & Wings, Buffalo's Cafe & Express, and Ponderosa and Bonanza Steakhouses.

== Expansion outside the continental United States ==
Fazoli's began expanding outside the continental United States during the 2020s.

In 2024, Fazoli's announced a franchise development agreement with Briwin Restaurants Inc. to open up to 25 locations in Canada over a ten-year period. The chain's first international location opened in Calgary, Alberta, in June 2025. Two additional Alberta locations subsequently opened in Okotoks and Airdrie. In October 2026, Fazoli's opened its fourth Canadian location in Saskatoon, Saskatchewan, marking its first restaurant in the province.

Fazoli's also entered Puerto Rico in 2026, opening its first restaurant on the island in Bayamón.

== Restaurants and menu ==
Fazoli's operates as a fast-casual and quick-service restaurant chain, with many locations offering drive-through service.

The menu includes pasta entrées, baked pasta dishes, pizza, sandwiches, salads and desserts. The chain is also known for its breadsticks, including unlimited breadstick service for dine-in customers at participating restaurants.

== Corporate affairs ==
Fazoli's corporate operations are based in Lexington, Kentucky. As of 2026, Tim Kimmel serves as president of Fazoli's. Following the restructuring of FAT Brands in 2026, Fazoli's became part of the OHG Brands portfolio.

== See also ==
- List of Italian restaurants
- List of fast casual restaurants
