= Marble Slab Creamery =

American ice cream parlor chain

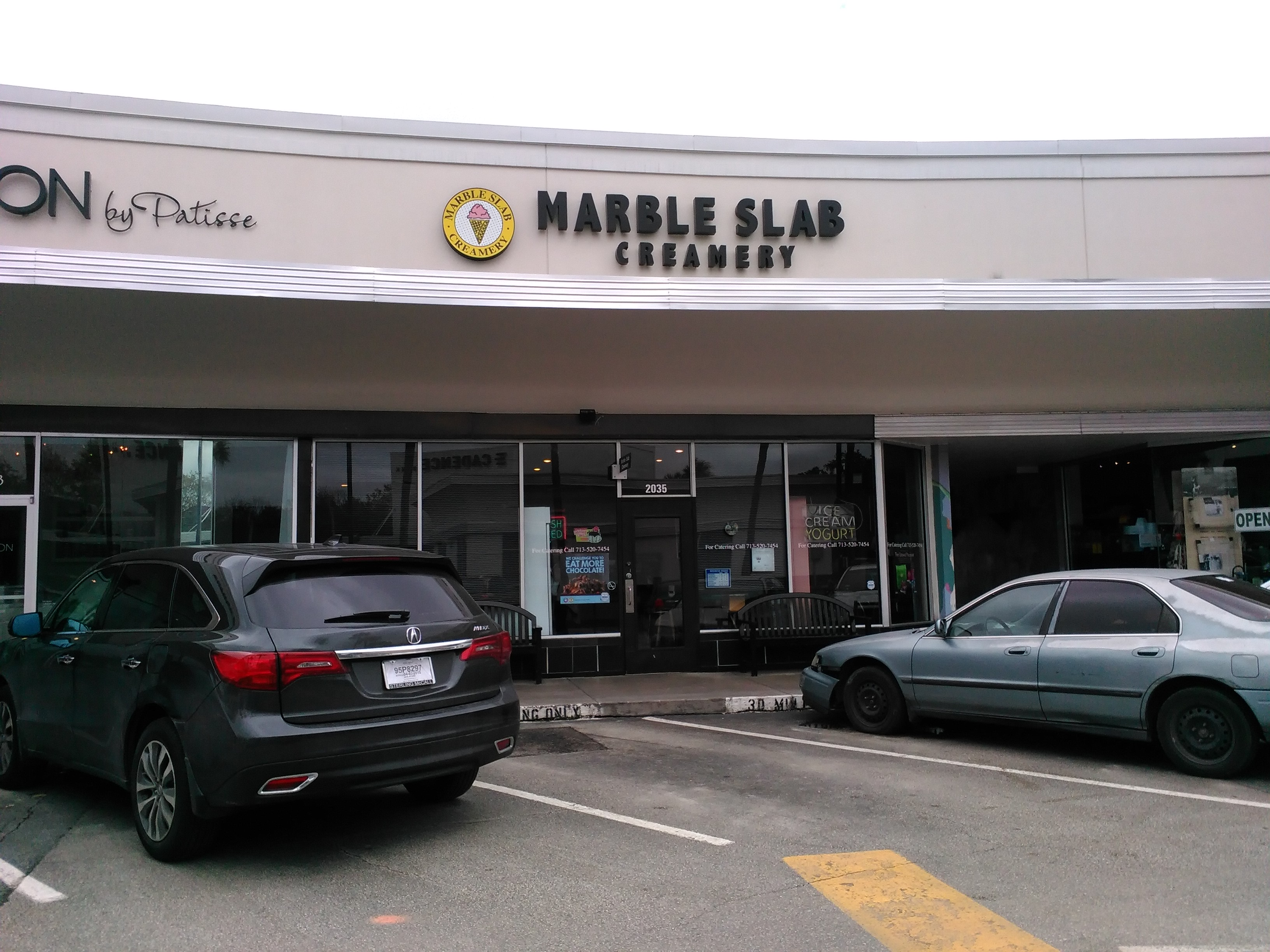
- A Marble Slab Creamery location at the River Oaks Shopping Center
- Formerly: Cones & Cream (1983–1986)
- Type: Subsidiary
- Industry: Restaurant
- Genre: Ice cream store
- Founded: 1983; 43 years ago in Houston, Texas, U.S.
- Founders: Sigmund Penn; Tom LePage
- Headquarters: Atlanta, Georgia, U.S.
- Number of locations: 391 (2021)
- Area served: United States (including Puerto Rico, Guam) Canada, Bahrain, Kuwait, Oman, Pakistan, Qatar, Saudi Arabia, United Arab Emirates
- Key people: Andy Wiederhorn (CEO, FAT Brands)
- Products: Ice cream desserts, cakes, pies, shakes, smoothies, frozen yogurt
- Parent: FBG Bid Co.
- Website: marbleslab.com

Marble Slab Creamery (Marble Slab) is an American chain of ice cream shops owned by FBG Bid Co. Its corporate offices are in Atlanta, Georgia.

There are more than 391 stores in various countries, all independently owned and franchised.

== History ==
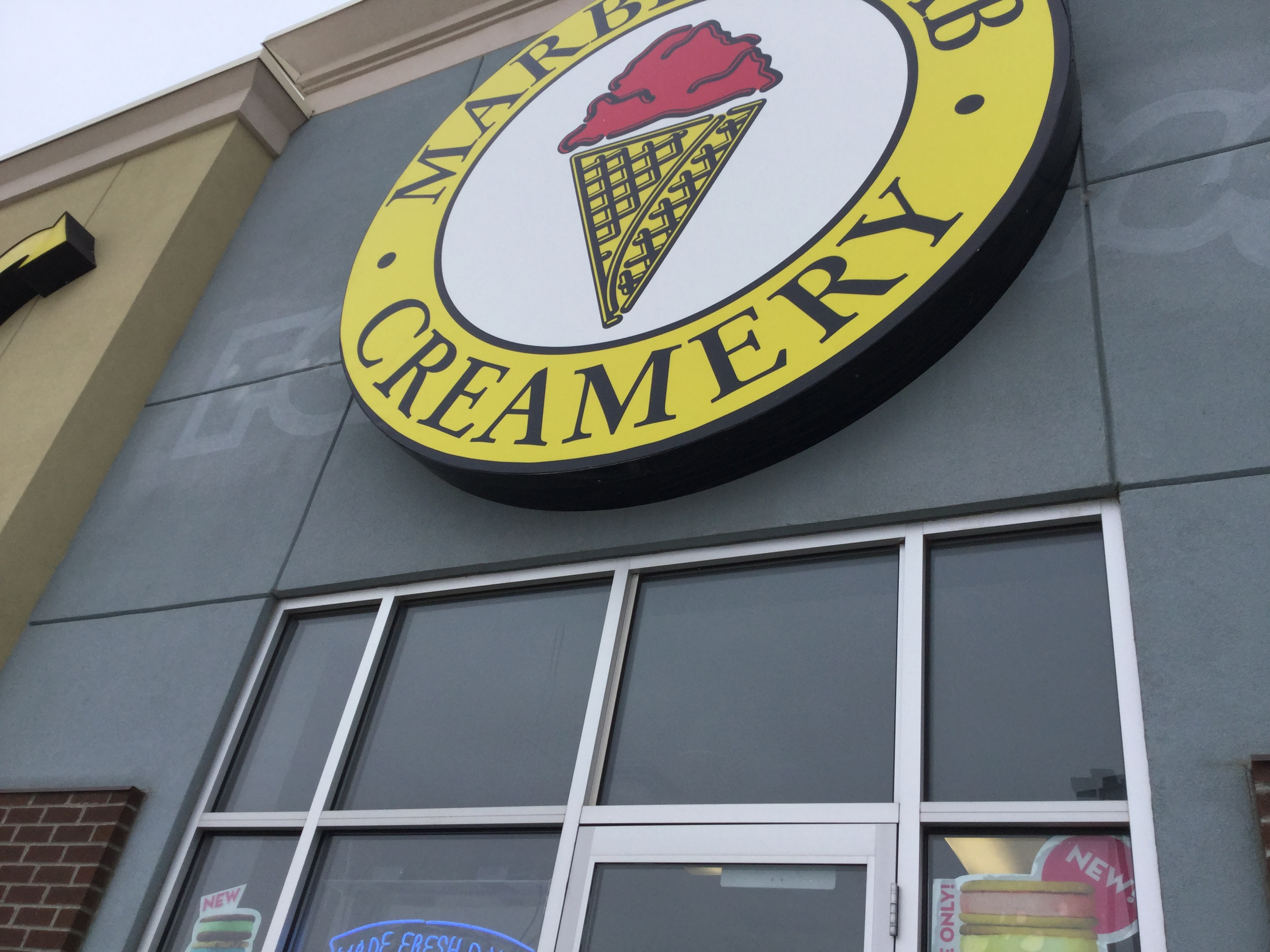
A Marble Slab Creamery in Edmonton, Alberta

Marble Slab, which began as a single unit operation called Cones & Cream, was founded in Houston by chefs Sigmund Penn and Tom LePage in 1983. They were inspired by Steve Herrell of Herrell's Ice Cream in Boston, who pioneered the mixing approach to ice cream toppings. In 1986, Marble Slab became the first ice cream treatery to use a frozen granite slab to blend mix-in toppings into the ice cream. Later that year, Marble Slab was bought by Ronnie Hankamer of Texas, who laid the groundwork for the brand's franchising concept.

In the late 2000s, Marble Slab expanded beyond its southeastern presence and has been recognized as a fast-growing franchise. In 2007 it was ranked in Entrepreneur Magazine's Franchise 500 (#93), Fastest-Growing Franchises (#72), and America's Top Global Franchises (#75).

As an independent company it had its headquarters in the Westchase area of Houston, Texas. After the NexCen acquisition, initially the brand's headquarters were in unincorporated Gwinnett County, Georgia. In July 2010, NexCen announced the sale of its franchise business to Global Franchise Group, LLC, an affiliate of Levine Leichtman Capital Partners. Global Franchise Group is now owned by Lion Capital LLP and Serruya Private Equity.

=== Ownership changes ===
In February 2007, Global Franchise Group purchased Marble Slab Creamery taking the company off the stock market. Since its acquisition the chain has been a franchise brand with MaggieMoo's Ice Cream and Treatery and Great American Cookies.

On June 28, 2021, Global Franchise Group announced that it would be acquired by FAT Brands, owners of Fatburger and Johnny Rockets. The acquisition was completed on July 22.

On January 26, 2026, parent company FAT Brands filed for Chapter 11 bankruptcy protection in an effort to shed billions of dollars in debt. The company listed assets and liabilities between $1 billion and $10 billion. After receiving court approval for the sale of its assets, FBG Bid Co. officially acquired the remaining assets from FAT Brands for $595 million on June 18, 2026, including Marble Slab Creamery.

== Products ==
The chain specializes in serving homemade ice cream. The chain serves a variety of other desserts including ice cream cakes, sundaes and milkshakes as well as smoothies.
