= Great American Cookies =

American cookie store chain

Great American Cookie Co.

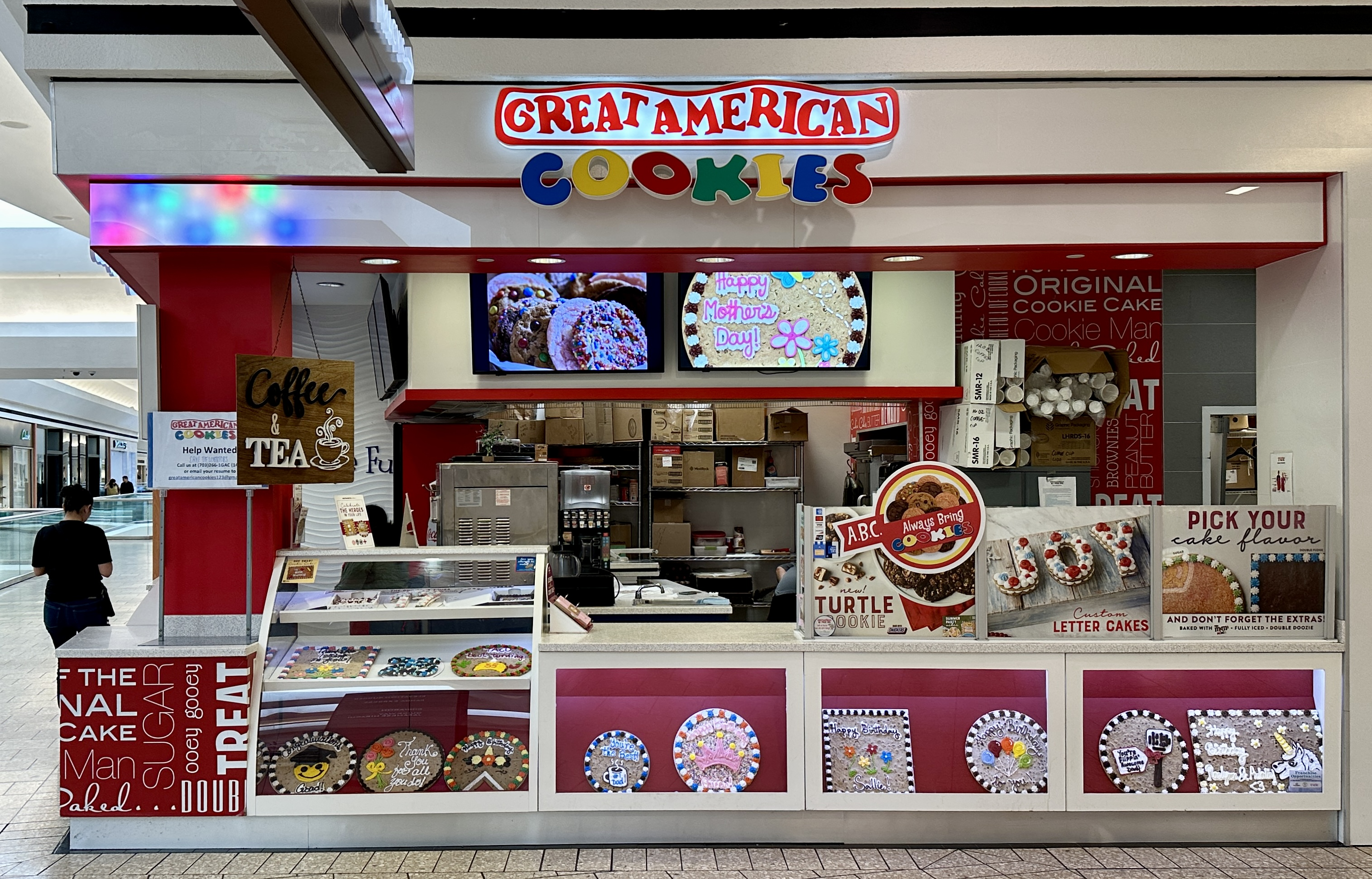
- Great American Cookies at Fair Oaks Mall, Virginia, in 2026
- Trade name: Great American Cookie
- Type: Wholly owned subsidiary
- Industry: Food; Bake shop Franchising
- Founded: 1977; 49 years ago Dunwoody, Georgia, U.S.
- Founders: Michael J. Coles; Arthur Karp
- Headquarters: Atlanta, Georgia, U.S.
- Number of locations: 372 (May 2, 2026)
- Area served: United States; Bahrain; Saudi Arabia
- Products: Cookies; Cookie cake; Sandwich cookies; Brownies
- Parent: FBG Bid Co.
- Website: greatamericancookies.com

Great American Cookie Co., doing business as Great American Cookies, is an American chain of independently owned and operated franchised stores that specialize in gourmet cookies, especially cookie cakes. It has over 370 stores in the U.S., particularly in the Southeast as well as Puerto Rico and Guam, most commonly located in malls. The company was founded in 1977 and has its headquarters in Atlanta. It has been a franchise brand in the portfolio of Global Franchise Group since 2010.

== History ==
Old logo

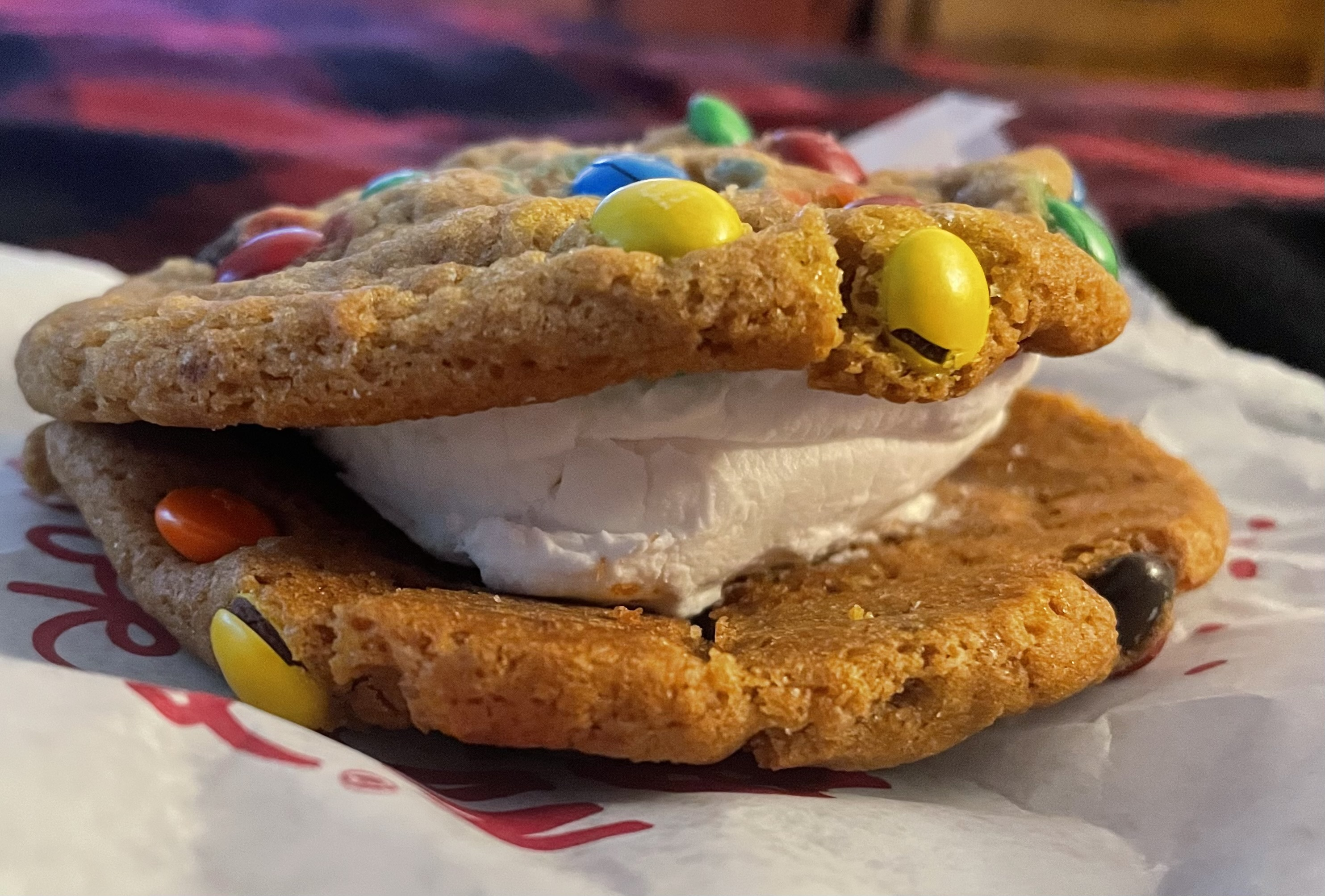
A M&M ‘Double Doozie’ cookie from Great American Cookies

Great American Cookie Co. was founded by future CEO Michael J. Coles and partner Arthur Karp, who each invested $4,000 to develop a business selling cookies on the strength of a family recipe passed on to Karp's wife. That same year the first store opened in Atlanta's Perimeter Mall.

The first store in Perimeter Mall became successful in its first month, and the company first became franchised the year after its opening. By 1985, the company had revenue of $100 million per year and was the largest retail cookie chain in the U.S.

In 1985, Coles shortened the name to Great American Cookie Company, with a plan to shorten it further to Great American Cookies. "To complement the revised recipes and pricing structure, we refashioned our branding. Our name—the Original Great American Chocolate Chip Cookie Company—was cute at first, but it had become a liability. What might work for a small, local company did not have national cachet," said Coles.

When Coles sold the firm to Mrs. Fields Famous Brands in 1998, the company had sales of over $100 million. On January 29, 2008, the company was acquired by NexCen Brands Inc. for its Quick Service Restaurant portfolio, which included sister companies Marble Slab Creamery, MaggieMoo's Ice Cream and Treatery and Pretzelmaker. Since July 2010, this portfolio of brands has been owned by Global Franchise Group, LLC, an affiliate of Levine Leichtman Capital Partners, and managed by GFG Management.

On June 28, 2021, Global Franchise Group announced that it would be acquired by FAT Brands, owners of Fatburger and Johnny Rockets. The acquisition was completed on July 22.

On January 26, 2026, parent company FAT Brands filed for Chapter 11 bankruptcy protection in an effort to shed billions of dollars in debt. The company listed assets and liabilities between $1 billion and $10 billion. After receiving court approval for the sale of its assets, FBG Bid Co. officially acquired the remaining assets from FAT Brands for $595 million on June 18, 2026, including Great American Cookies.
