= Hot Sam =

US restaurant chain

Hot Sam Pretzels
- Type: Private
- Industry: Food
- Founded: 1966; 60 years ago
- Defunct: 2005; 21 years ago
- Fate: Acquired by Mrs. Fields from 1995 to 2005, merged to its brands
- Successor: Pretzel Time
- Headquarters: Southfield, Michigan, U.S.
- Services: Restaurants
- Owner: Mrs. Fields

Hot Sam was an American restaurant chain selling soft pretzels.

Julius Young opened the first outlet at Livonia Mall in a Detroit suburb in Michigan.

In 1971, the owners sold the company to General Host, who then owned the Detroit-based retailer Frank's Nursery & Crafts. General Host sold it again in 1986.

Mrs. Fields acquired the chain in 1995. Mrs. Field's purchased Pretzel Time in 1996 and merged the two chains under the "Pretzel Time" brand. The last 10 locations were converted in 2005.

== In popular culture ==
Hot Sam was recreated in 2018 for an appearance in the mall food court of the Netflix series Stranger Things, which is set in the mid-1980s. The faux mall facades were constructed at Gwinnett Place Mall near Atlanta, Georgia, where the series is filmed.
