= Ed Rensi =

American businessman

- Born: 1944 (age 81–82)
- Education: Ohio State University
- Occupation: Businessman
- Known for: President and CEO of McDonald's USA from 1991 to 1997
- Spouse: Barbara Tyrrell Rensi

Edward H. Rensi (born 1944) is an American businessman who was president and CEO of McDonald's USA from 1991 to 1997. He has been chairman of FAT Brands since October 2017.

== Early life ==
Rensi has a bachelor's degree in business education from Ohio State University.

== Career ==
Rensi started working for McDonald's in 1966, as "a grill man and part-time manager trainee" in Columbus, Ohio, rising to restaurant manager within a year.

He was president and CEO of McDonald's USA from 1991 to 1997, and is "credited with development of chicken McNuggets and numerous other innovations".

From October 1998 to 2011, Rensi was owner, chairman and CEO of Team Rensi Motorsports, a NASCAR car racing team.

Rensi was interim CEO of Famous Dave's from February 2014 to June 2015. He has been chairman of FAT Brands, since October 2017.

== Personal life ==
Rensi and his wife Barbara live in Oak Brook, Illinois, a suburb of Chicago.
