= Global Franchise Group =

American brand management company

- Industry: Brand management
- Founded: 2010; 16 years ago
- Headquarters: Atlanta, Georgia, United States
- Owner: FAT Brands
- Subsidiaries: Great American Cookies; Hot Dog on a Stick; MaggieMoo's; Marble Slab Creamery; Pretzelmaker; Round Table Pizza
- Website: fatbrands.com

Global Franchise Group was a brand-acquisition and management firm headquartered in Atlanta, Georgia, United States. It specialized in franchising and quick-service restaurant industries. It was founded in 2010 with the acquisition of NexCen Brands' properties and was acquired by FAT Brands in July 2021.

== History ==
Global Franchise Group was established in 2010 after Levine Leichtman bought all of NexCen Brands Inc.’s franchise businesses for $112.5 million.

The company, wanting to focus solely on restaurants, sold its shoe brand, The Athlete's Foot to Intersport, LLC in July 2012.

== Acquisitions and sale ==
In August 2014, Global Franchise Group acquired Hot Dog on a Stick. In September 2017, Global Franchise Group acquired Round Table Pizza.

In July 2021, Global Franchise Group was acquired by FAT Brands.
