= Pretzelmaker =

US bakery chain

- Logo since August 2023
- Type: Subsidiary
- Industry: Restaurant
- Predecessors: Pretzelmaker; Pretzel Time
- Founded: 1991; 35 years ago
- Founder: Jeffery Tripp
- Headquarters: Atlanta, Georgia, United States
- Number of locations: 86 (2026)
- Area served: Canada; Guam; Philippines; Saudi Arabia; United States
- Key people: Christopher Dull (CEO)
- Products: Soft pretzels, smoothies, soft drinks
- Parent: FBG Bid Co.
- Website: pretzelmaker.com

Pretzelmaker is a chain of independently owned and operated franchised stores that specialize in hand-rolled pretzels, smoothies and cold beverages. It is a franchise brand in the portfolio of Global Franchise Group. It has 86 locations in the U.S.

== History ==
Former Pretzelmaker logos

Founder Jeffery Tripp opened the first Pretzelmaker store in 1991. He changed the name of the company to Pretzelmaker for nationwide franchising purposes. Charles L. Smith was the founding president of Pretzelmaker, Corporation with Bruce W. Stratford, Legal Council and CFO. J. Kelly Hansen and Stephen A. Thorpe ran the day-to-day operations as co-founders and VP of Sales and VP of Operations respectively. The brand quickly grew to more than 100 franchises sold, with 40 stores operating by 1995 when it was bought by a group of investors that helped make Pretzelmaker a mall mainstay, particularly in the West Coast. Don Cox, Marc Geman, Tony Joseph and Dale Fowler bought the company in 1995 with a small group of investors. In the next 36 months this group took the company from 11 opened stores to 288. Director of Operations Tony Joseph and his operation team were the driving force opening 7 locations a month. Mr. Joseph trained all franchisees US wide, Canada, South Korea, Thailand, Hong Kong and Singapore. In 1998 Pretzelmaker was voted the fastest growing food Franchise in the US according to Restaurant News and Entrepreneur Magazine. Dale Fowler was the Sr. Vice President of Marketing. Mr. Fowler put Pretzelmaker on the map with Media articles from the top newspapers and magazines from all over the US. Don Cox was the President until he was relieved of his duties in 1998. Marc Geman was the CEO until the company was sold in 1999.

Pretzel Time logo

The first Pretzel Time store opened in Trumbull, Connecticut. The company was originally incorporated as Mr. Pretzel Inc. in 1991, but quickly changed its name to Pretzel Time by the time it became a popularly franchised mall-based store in the Northeast.

In 1999, Mrs. Fields Famous Brands purchased Pretzelmaker. Later it sold the brands to NexCen in 2007 in a combined transaction total of $29.7 million. In 1996, Mrs. Fields had acquired the now-defunct Hot Sam which it merged with Pretzelmaker in 2005.

Global Franchise Group (GFG) purchased NexCen Franchise Management in 2010, and merged Pretzel Time and Pretzelmaker into one brand as Pretzelmaker. Pretzelmaker today is the second largest retailer of freshly baked, hand rolled and twisted pretzels.

On June 28, 2021, Global Franchise Group announced that it would be acquired by FAT Brands, owners of Fatburger and Johnny Rockets. The acquisition was completed on July 22.

On January 26, 2026, parent company FAT Brands filed for Chapter 11 bankruptcy protection in an effort to shed billions of dollars in debt. The company listed assets and liabilities between $1 billion and $10 billion. After receiving court approval for the sale of its assets, FBG Bid Co. officially acquired the remaining assets from FAT Brands for $595 million on June 18, 2026, including Pretzelmaker.
