= MaggieMoo's Ice Cream and Treatery =

Chain of icecream shops

- Type: Subsidiary
- Industry: Restaurants
- Genre: Ice cream shop
- Founded: 1989; 37 years ago; Kansas City, Kansas
- Headquarters: Fulton County, Georgia
- Number of locations: 5 as of March 10, 2022
- Area served: Stores in: United States; Puerto Rico
- Products: Ice cream, sundaes, milkshakes, smoothies and cakes
- Services: Franchise
- Parent: FAT Brands
- Website: maggiemoos.com

MaggieMoo's Ice Cream and Treatery is a chain of independently owned and operated franchised stores that specialize in serving ice cream and other desserts. The first MaggieMoo's opened in 1989 in Kansas City, Kansas. At its peak, the brand had 400 stores and had a goal of opening over 1,000 stores. The brand's headquarters are in unincorporated Fulton County, Georgia. When MaggieMoo's was an independent company, it had its headquarters in Columbia, Maryland. It later became a franchise brand in the portfolio of Global Franchise Group, along with Marble Slab Creamery, until 2021 after Global Franchise Group was acquired by FAT Brands.

== History ==
MaggieMoo's was founded in Kansas City, Kansas by Juel and Katherine Tillery. After deciding to open an ice cream store they were searching for a name. They named their store after a cow on a farm that they passed by every day whom their young daughter affectionally named "MaggieMoo". The Tillerys enjoyed great success in their initial store and began to launch a franchise program. By 1996 there were approximately 90 units open, mostly in Kansas City, and surrounding midwestern markets.

But the franchise system was undercapitalized and in need of experienced management as well as capital. The Tillerys sold the company to Richard Sharoff who was a veteran of the food and franchise industry having previously been a 30-store franchisee of Boston Market and president of Vie de France. Sharoff raised the necessary expansion capital and moved the headquarters to Columbia, Maryland, He built a team of franchise and restaurant professionals while dramatically improving the branding, store design and operating systems. Sharoff engaged the marketing firm River City Studios who collaborated with Kansas City cartoonist Charlie Podrebarac to create the MaggieMoo character, logo, and the "Tail of MaggieMoo", who became the chain's "spokescow". The franchise program enjoyed explosive growth under Sharoff's leadership and the chain celebrated its 100th unit opening in Phoenix, Arizona in 2003.

Sharoff sold his interests in the company in 2003 to his partner Stuart Olsten who then brought in Panera Bread executive John Jamison to replace Sharoff. In February 2007 the company was sold to NexCen Brands, Inc. for a reported $16 million. Global Franchise Group acquired NexCen in July 2010.

On June 28, 2021, Global Franchise Group announced that it would be acquired by FAT Brands (NASDAQ: FAT) is a leading global franchising company and owns 17 restaurant brands consisting of 2,300 units around the world including Round Table Pizza, Fatburger, Marble Slab Creamery, Johnny Rockets, Fazoli's, Twin Peaks, Great American Cookies, Hot Dog on a Stick, Buffalo's Cafe & Express, Hurricane Grill & Wings, Pretzelmaker, Elevation Burger, Native Grill & Wings, Yalla Mediterranean and Ponderosa and Bonanza Steakhouses. The acquisition was completed in July 2021. After the acquisition, MaggieMoo's scaled down its operations and most locations have been converted to Marble Slab Creamery.

On January 26, 2026, parent company FAT Brands filed for Chapter 11 bankruptcy protection in an effort to shed billions of dollars in debt. The company listed assets and liabilities between $1 billion and $10 billion.

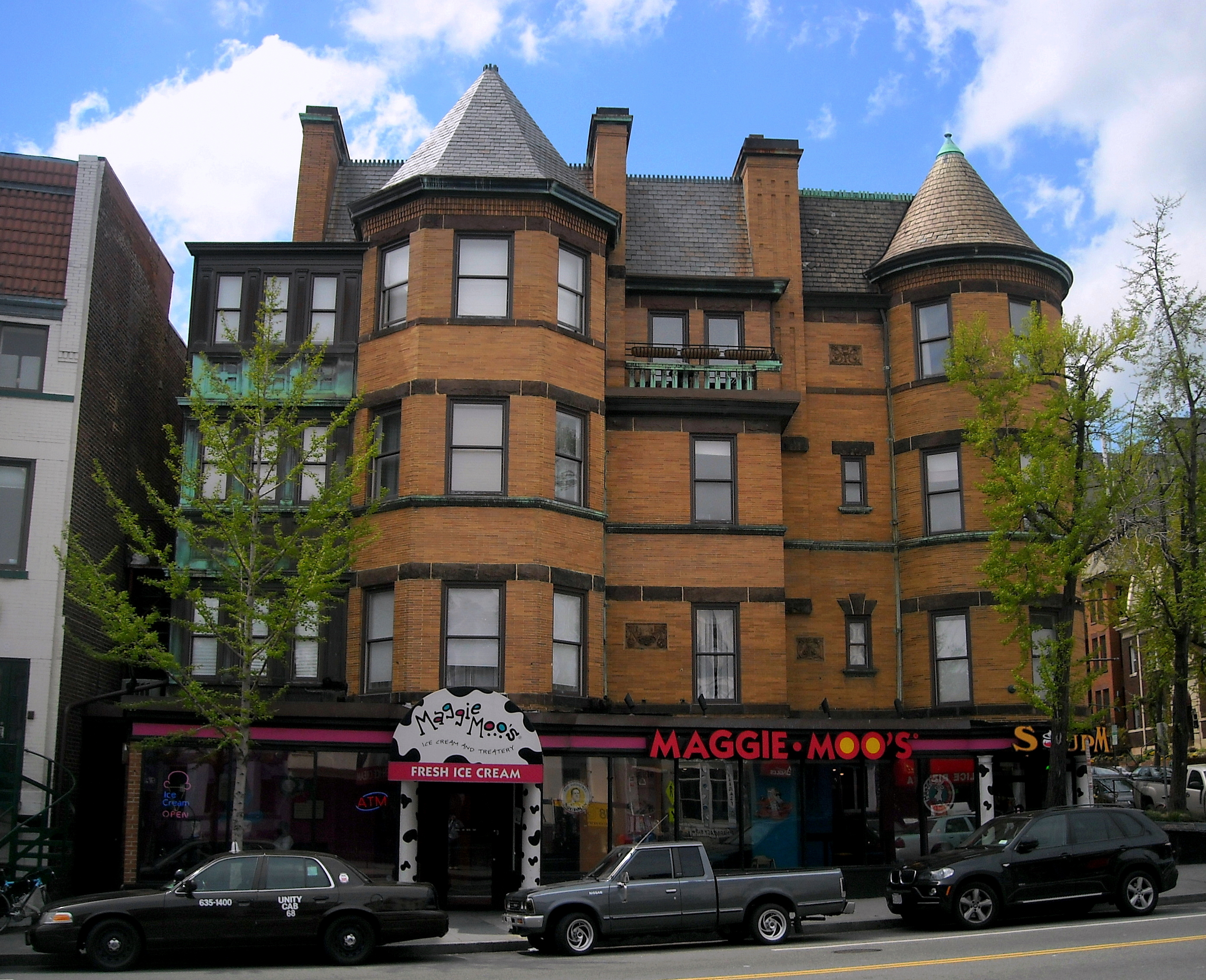
MaggieMoo's store located in the Adams Morgan neighborhood of Washington, D.C.

== Charity work ==
The company does various charity works, under the name of their mascot, Miss Maggie Moo.

According to the company, their activities, all fronted by their mascot, include "rescuing animals with the Humane Society, raising money for the Hurricane Katrina Victims, walking in support of a cure for breast cancer, assisting schools to raise money, or helping Girl Scouts and Boy Scouts earn their badges."
