= Johnny Rockets =

American restaurant chain

The Johnny Rockets Group Inc.
- Trade name: Johnny Rockets
- Type: Subsidiary
- Industry: Restaurant
- Genre: Diner
- Founded: June 6, 1986; 40 years ago Los Angeles, California, U.S.
- Founder: Ronn Teitelbaum
- Headquarters: 1855 Boston Rd Suite 300; Wilbraham, Massachusetts, U.S. 01095
- Number of locations: 385 (2016) ▼147 (2021)
- Area served: Worldwide
- Key people: Lee Sanders, President, CEO, Board of Directors
- Products: Burgers, milkshakes, french fries, salads, sandwiches, hot dogs, soft drinks
- Revenue: US$ 300 million (2012)
- Parent: Independent (1986–2007); RedZone Capital (2007–2013); Sun Capital Partners (2013–2020); FAT Brands (2020–2026); FBG Bid Co. (2026-present)
- Website: johnnyrockets.com

The Johnny Rockets Group Inc., commonly known simply as Johnny Rockets, is an American restaurant franchise whose themed decor is based upon 1950s diner-style restaurants. As of April 2024, the company operates 90 locations in Arizona, California, Connecticut, Washington, D.C., Florida, Georgia, Hawaii, Illinois, Louisiana, Maine, Maryland, Massachusetts, Minnesota, Missouri, Nevada, New Jersey, New York, Pennsylvania, Rhode Island, Tennessee, Texas, Utah, Virginia, and Washington. Décor includes Coca-Cola advertising, featuring nearly life-sized cardboard illustrations of women in World War II armed services uniforms (Women Airforce Service Pilots), individual jukebox stations, chrome accents, and red vinyl seats.

The menu, presentation, counter seating, and grilling area are based on an original restaurant from 1947, The Apple Pan in West Los Angeles. The Apple Pan still operates to this day. Hamburgers are grilled to order in full view of the customers and are served wrapped in paper in metal baskets. One location in Hawaii is called "Rock 'n Fun" and also has an arcade.

== History ==
Johnny Rockets was founded on June 6, 1986, by Ronn Teitelbaum of Los Angeles, California, and "crafted as a 'nongimmicky' recreation of the 1940s-vintage malt shops of his childhood". The first restaurant was established as a 20-stool counter operation on Melrose Avenue in Los Angeles. This location permanently closed on October 26, 2015. Teitelbaum died from brain cancer on September 11, 2000, at age 61.

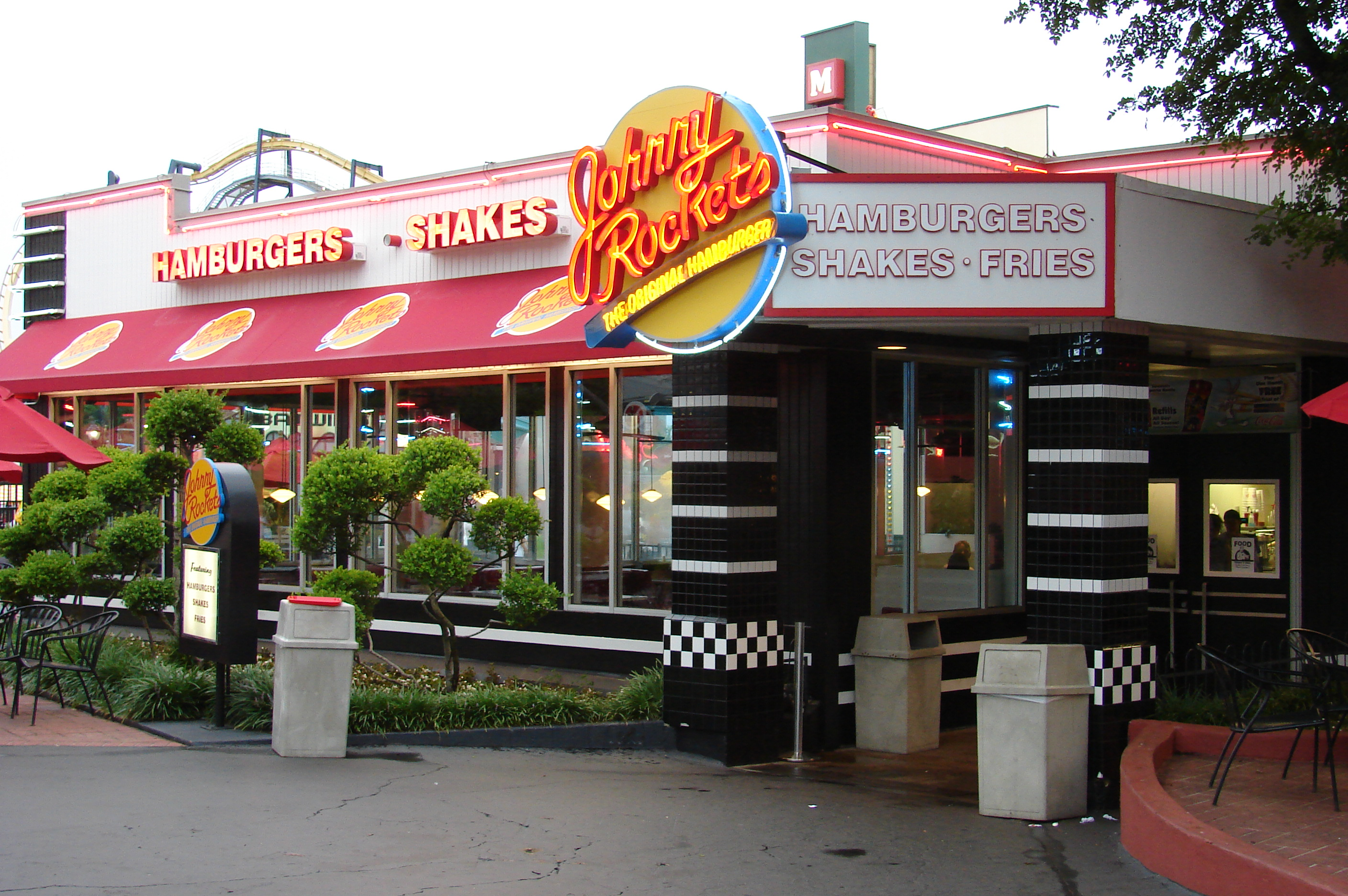
Johnny Rockets at Six Flags Over Texas

In February 2007, it was announced that RedZone Capital, the private equity firm of Daniel Snyder, was set to acquire the chain. Snyder announced plans to expand the chain both within the United States and worldwide, including the launch of smaller outlets known as Johnny Rockets Express. Snyder recruited industry veteran Lee Sanders from Buffalo Wild Wings, formerly with Dunkin Brands, General Mills, and Pepsico, to serve as president, CEO, and board member. Sanders ran the business for almost four years.

A sit-down restaurant owned by Six Flags Great Escape (RedZone was the largest shareholder at the time), Trappers Adirondack Grill, was converted to a Johnny Rockets in June 2008. A few years later, Six Flags New England also got a Johnny Rockets near the Superman: Ride Of Steel.

In April 2009, the new Yankee Stadium opened with Johnny Rockets stands throughout the site. These stands serve traditional Johnny Rockets hamburgers, french fries, shakes, and malts, among other menu items. FedExField, home of the Washington Commanders (the stadium and team were owned by Snyder, whose company owned Johnny Rockets at the time), features Johnny Rockets concession areas.

The world's largest Johnny Rockets franchise opened on June 6, 2012, at the corner of Abraham Lincoln Avenue and Bolivar Avenue in Santo Domingo, the capital city of the Dominican Republic. The restaurant has more than 6,000 square feet (560 m^{2}) and seating for more than 200 guests.

In 2013, RedZone Capital Management sold the company to Sun Capital Partners.

On August 13, 2020, Johnny Rockets was acquired by FAT Brands (parent company of Fatburger) for $25 million.

On January 26, 2026, parent company FAT Brands filed for Chapter 11 bankruptcy protection in an effort to shed billions of dollars in debt. The company listed assets and liabilities between $1 billion and $10 billion. After receiving court approval for the sale of its assets, FBG Bid Co. officially acquired the remaining assets from FAT Brands for $595 million on June 18, 2026, including Johnny Rockets.

=== International ===
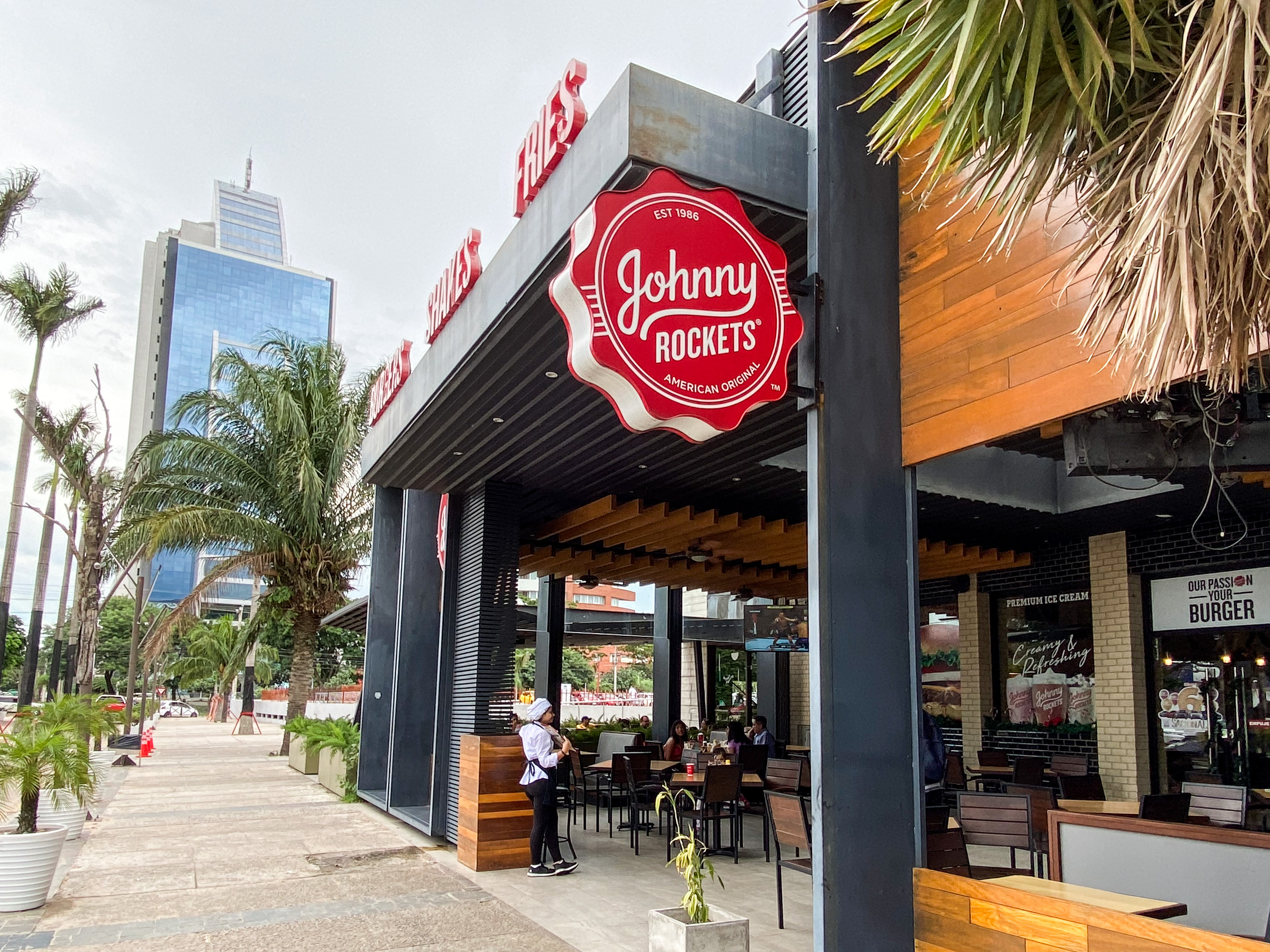
Johnny Rockets in Santa Cruz, Bolivia, an international location

Johnny Rockets operates restaurants in Australia, Bahrain, Bolivia, Brazil, Canada, Chile, Costa Rica, Cyprus, Ecuador, Honduras, India, Indonesia, Iraq, Italy, Kuwait, Mexico, Nigeria, Norway, Oman, Pakistan, Panama, Paraguay, Peru, the Philippines, Poland, Saudi Arabia, South Korea, Spain, Tunisia, and United Arab Emirates.

The first Johnny Rockets restaurant in Pakistan was opened in 2013 in Karachi. Locations opened in Lahore and Islamabad in 2014. Johnny Rockets opened its first branch in Paraguay on December 16, 2016, in Shopping Mariscal, Asunción. In 2016, it also opened branches in Peru and Bolivia.

The first European Johnny Rockets restaurant was opened in Brescia, Italy, on September 22, 2016, in Elnòs Shopping Center.

Johnny Rockets Canada had some Canadian locations, two in Victoria, British Columbia, two in the Toronto area, and two in Vancouver, British Columbia, before all were closed in 2022. One location remains in Windsor, Ontario.

In Indonesia, Johnny Rockets had several locations located across Jabodetabek metro area, but after the COVID-19 pandemic all were closed, leaving two branches left in the country. One is located in Terminal 3 of Soekarno-Hatta International Airport and one in the city center of Jakarta inside Grand Sahid Jaya Hotel.

Several Royal Caribbean International cruise ships have Johnny Rockets restaurants operating on board.

== See also ==
- Eddie Rocket's
- Ed's Easy Diner
- List of hamburger restaurants
