= Economy of Indianapolis =

The economy of Indianapolis is centered on the City of Indianapolis and Marion County within the context of the larger Indianapolis metropolitan area. The Indianapolis–Carmel–Anderson, IN MSA, had a gross domestic product (GDP) of $134 billion in 2015. The top five industries were: finance, insurance, real estate, rental, and leasing ($30.7B), manufacturing ($30.1B), professional and business services ($14.3B), educational services, health care, and social assistance ($10.8B), and wholesale trade ($8.1B). Government, if it had been a private industry, would have ranked fifth, generating $10.2 billion.

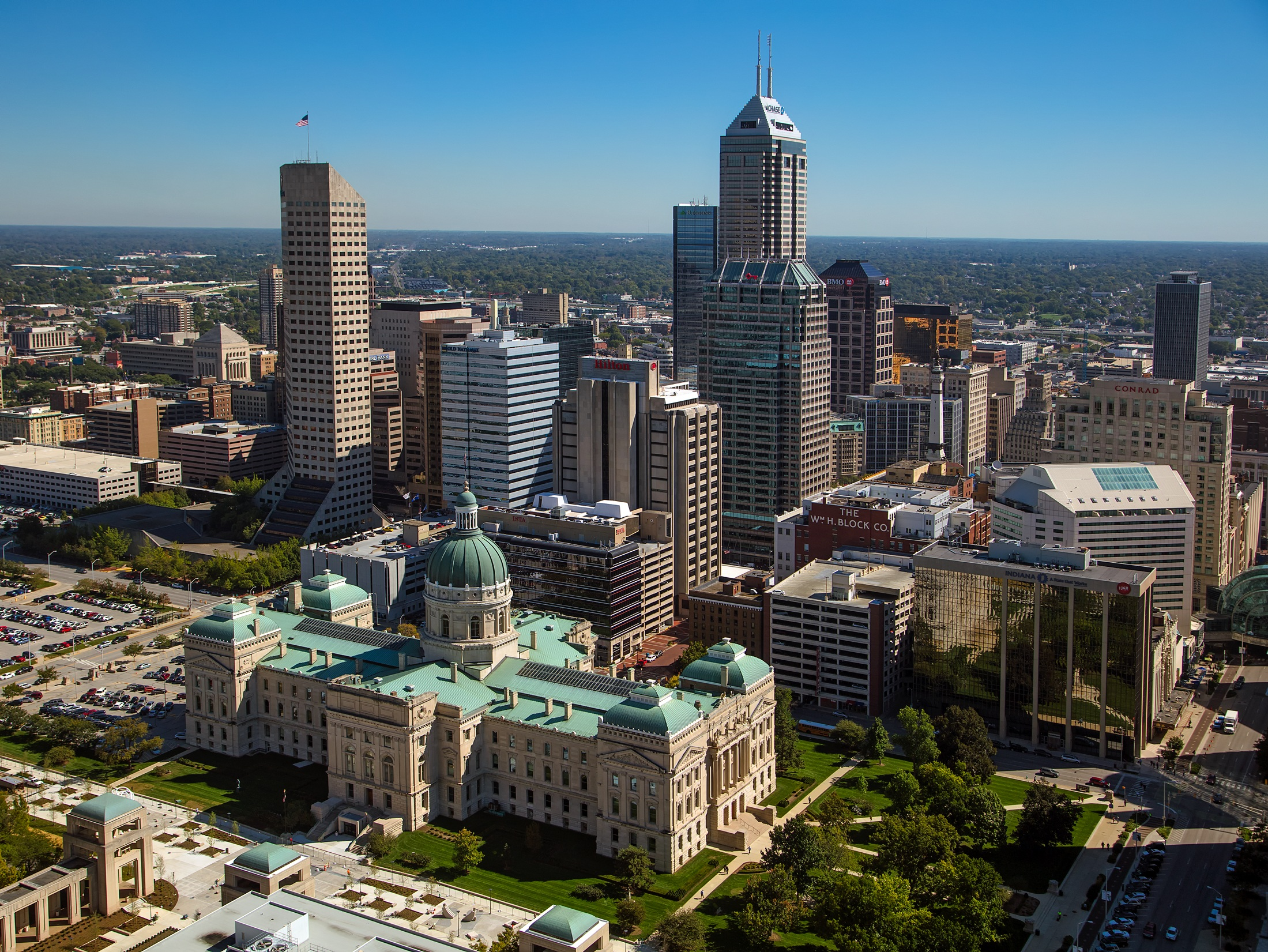
Downtown Indianapolis, the city's central business district, is the largest employment cluster in Indiana, with nearly 43,000 jobs per square mile (17,000/km^{2}).

Compared to Indiana as a whole, the Indianapolis metropolitan area has a lower proportion of manufacturing jobs and a higher concentration of jobs in wholesale trade; administrative, support, and waste management; professional, scientific, and technical services; and transportation and warehousing. The city's major exports include pharmaceuticals, motor vehicle parts, medical equipment and supplies, engine and power equipment, and aircraft products and parts. According to the Bureau of Labor Statistics, the region's unemployment rate was 2.8 percent in May 2019.

In 2021, the Indianapolis metropolitan area was home to three Fortune 500 companies and six Fortune 1000 companies. The largest public companies based in the area were insurance company Elevance Health, pharmaceutical company Lilly, agrochemical company Corteva, real estate investment trust Simon Property Group, pharmaceutical (animal health) company Elanco, financial services company CNO Financial Group, specialty chemicals company Calumet, Inc., automotive components manufacturer Allison Transmission, and automotive remarketing company OpenLane. Private companies based in the area include financial services company OneAmerica Financial, agricultural cooperative CountryMark, and regional airline Republic Airways Holdings.

== History ==
=== Notable bids ===
In 1991, United Airlines selected Indianapolis International Airport for a $1 billion (equivalent to $2.23 billion in 2025) maintenance operations center after a competitive bidding process involving more than 90 cities. State and local officials agreed to subsidize United's costs by providing nearly $300 million (equivalent to $668.62 million in 2025) in tax credits and other incentives in exchange for thousands of high-wage jobs by 2004. Following United's filing for Chapter 11 bankruptcy protection in 2002, the 1.7 million square foot (160,000 m^{2}) Indianapolis Maintenance Center closed in 2003. According to the Indianapolis Business Journal, "records are hard to come by, but during United's glory days, it is believed to have employed as many as 3,000 people at IMC [Indianapolis Maintenance Center]"—short of the 6,300 jobs United committed to in 1991.

Indianapolis submitted a bid to lure Amazon's HQ2 in 2017. In 2018, the company shortlisted Indianapolis as one of 20 finalists from a pool of 238 bids.

== Dominant industries ==
=== Transportation and logistics ===
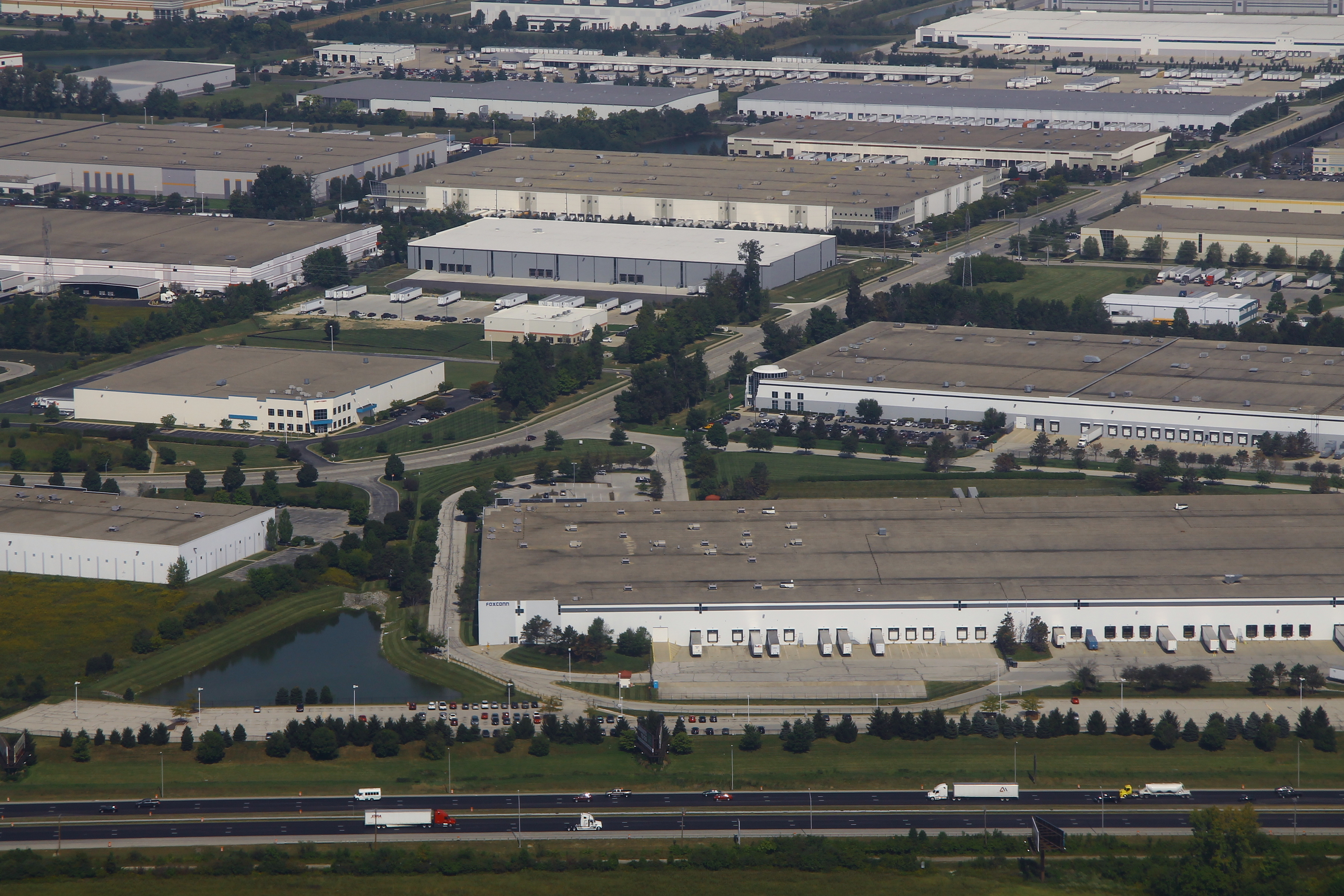
Interstate 70 passes a large warehouse district near Indianapolis International Airport.

Indianapolis's central location relative to other major North American markets, plus its extensive air, rail, and highway infrastructure, have positioned the region as an important center for the transportation and logistics industry. In 2022, the Indianapolis metropolitan area was home to some 5,280 logistics companies that employed about 126,000. Park 100 in Pike Township on the city's northwest side is the largest industrial park in the region, encompassing an area of 1,800 acres (730 hectares) and gross leasable area exceeding 20,000,000 square feet (1,900,000 m^{2}).

Amazon has a major presence in the Indianapolis area, employing 9,000 across eight fulfillment centers: two in Indianapolis (IND4 and IND8); two in Plainfield (IND2 and IND5); two in Whitestown (IND1 and XUSE); and one each in Greenfield (MQJ1) and Greenwood (IND9). FedEx employs 7,000 workers across 35 facilities in the city. The city is home to FedEx Express's National Hub which employs 5,800 workers in sorting, distribution, and shipping at Indianapolis International Airport. The airport ranks among the ten busiest U.S. airports in terms of air cargo throughput.

Other major employers in the region include DHL Group, Dollar General, Express Scripts, Finish Line, FullBeauty Brands, Ingram Micro, J. B. Hunt, Kroger, Pearson plc, Republic Airways Holdings, Total Quality Logistics, United Airlines, UPS, Walmart, Wheaton World Wide Moving, and XPO, Inc. Cummins, based in Columbus, Indiana, expanded its footprint to the city in 2017 when the company opened its Global Distribution Business unit in downtown Indianapolis.

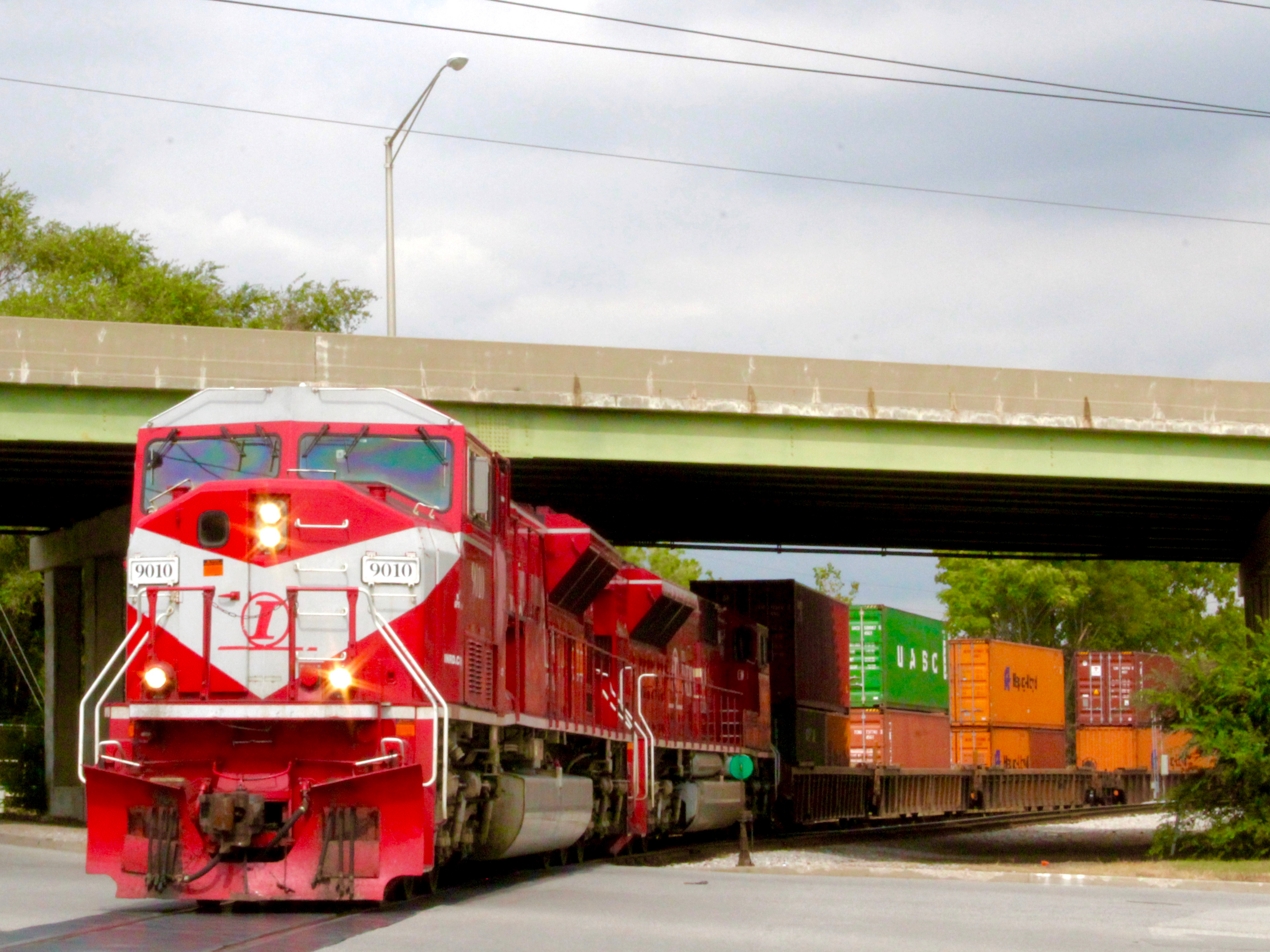
Indiana Rail Road locomotive transporting intermodal containers on Indianapolis's south side

Indianapolis's importance as a national rail center has diminished since the middle of the twentieth century; however, the city remains a regional hub for CSX Transportation, home to its division headquarters and a classification yard in the suburb of Avon. Amtrak's primary heavy maintenance and overhaul facility is housed in the Beech Grove Shops, located in the enclave of Beech Grove. Indianapolis is also home to Amtrak's largest material and supply terminal. Located south of downtown Indianapolis, the Senate Avenue Terminal is an intermodal freight transport facility that is owned by the Indiana Rail Road and operated by CN.

==== Foreign trade ====
Since 1981, the Indianapolis Airport Authority has overseen the Greater Indianapolis Foreign Trade Zone, Inc. (FTZ 72) (d/b/a INzone), a federal Foreign-Trade Zone encompassing 41 counties in central Indiana. In 2018, the World Trade Centers Association approved the city's request to establish a local World Trade Center organization.

=== Financial services ===
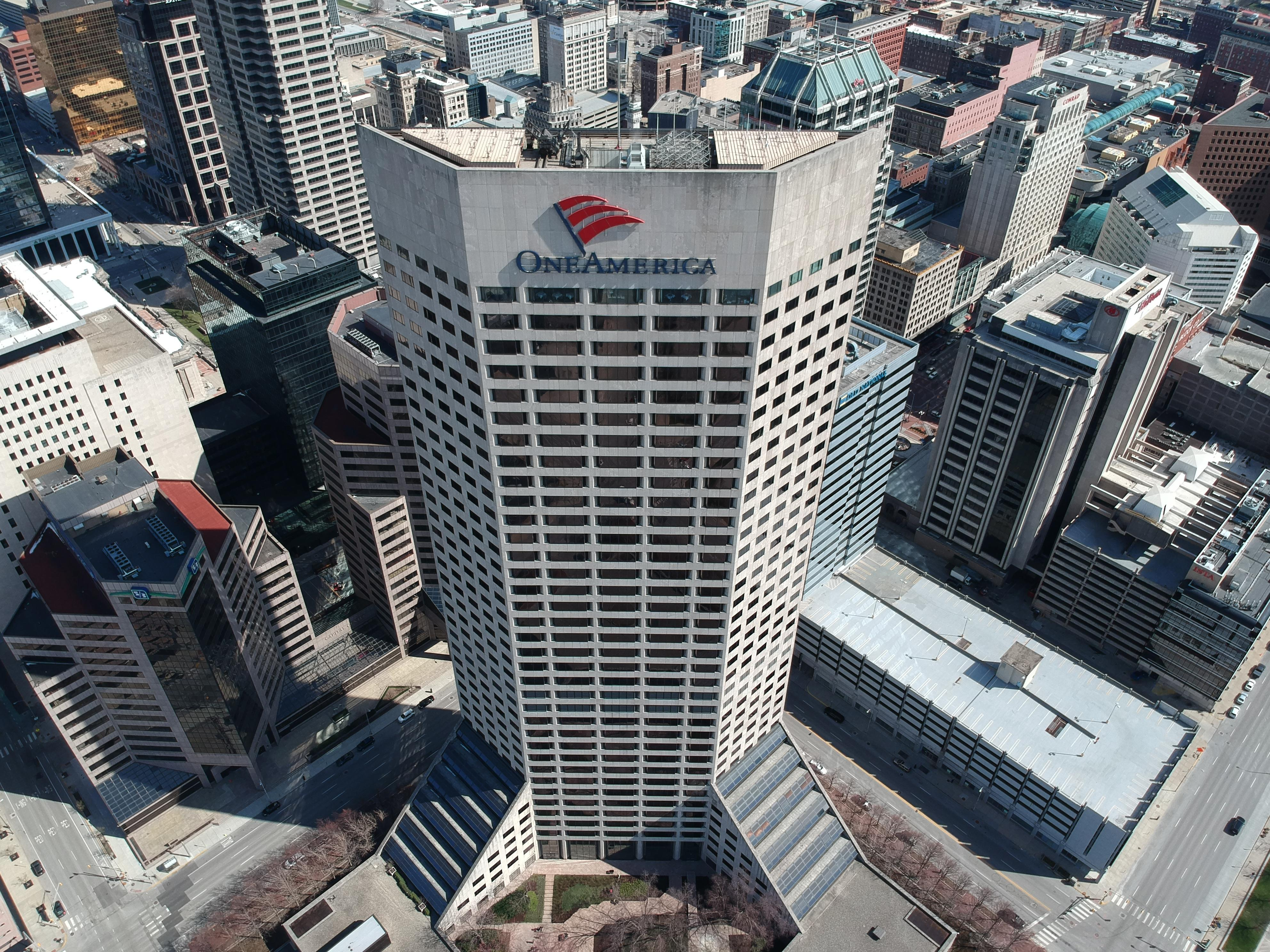
OneAmerica Tower

In 2020, Indianapolis's finance sector employed about 70,800 workers, primarily in banking and insurance. Elevance Health, one of three Fortune 500 companies headquartered in the city, employs more than 2,600 at the L. Ben Lytle Center. It is the largest for-profit managed care company in the Blue Cross Blue Shield Association, providing healthcare coverage to more than 42 million policyholders. Elevance is also the largest publicly traded company based in Indiana, with revenue of $122 billion in 2020.

OneAmerica Financial employs roughly 2,500 at its downtown Indianapolis headquarters in OneAmerica Tower. OneAmerica, founded in the city as American United Life (AUL) in 1877, is the second-largest privately held company in Indiana, with revenue of $2.7 billion in 2020.

Carmel-based CNO Financial Group provides life insurance, annuity, and supplemental health insurance products to more than 4 million U.S. customers. Its headquarters employs 1,200.

From the mid-1950s through the late 1980s, American Fletcher National Bank (AFNB), Indiana National Bank (later known as INB Financial Corporation), and Merchants National Corporation were among the three largest banks in the city. Beginning the 1980s, a series of acquisitions claimed the three Indianapolis-based companies. American Fletcher was acquired by Bank One Corporation in 1987 (succeeded in 2004 by JPMorgan Chase); INB Financial Corporation was acquired by the National Bank of Detroit in 1992 (also succeeded by JPMorgan Chase in 2004); and Merchants National Corporation was acquired by National City Corporation in 1992 (succeeded by PNC Financial Services in 2008).

JPMorgan Chase maintains a large local presence, with about 1,400 employees and local FDIC deposits totaling $14.4 billion, dwarfing all other financial institutions in central Indiana. Other notable banks serving the city's finance sector include Fifth Third Bank, Huntington Bancshares, Bank of America, First Merchants Corporation, BMO Bank, KeyBank, Old National Bank, Regions Financial Corporation, First Internet Bank, and First Financial Bank.

Indianapolis is home to one of 11 Federal Home Loan Banks.

=== Life sciences and healthcare ===
Indianapolis anchors one of the largest life sciences clusters in the U.S., notably in the subsectors of drugs and pharmaceuticals and agricultural feedstock and chemicals. Life sciences employ between 21,200 and 28,700 among nearly 350 companies located in the region. Indianapolis is also a hub for academic medicine and health sciences research, home to such institutions as the Indiana University School of Medicine, School of Nursing, and School of Dentistry; Indiana University Health; Marian University's Tom and Julie Wood College of Osteopathic Medicine and Leighton School of Nursing; and the American College of Sports Medicine.

According to a 2021 report commissioned by BioCrossroads, Central Indiana's life sciences and healthcare sector generates nearly $84 billion in total economic output and supports more than 331,000 jobs throughout the region.

==== Agricultural feedstock and chemicals ====
In 2020, the Indianapolis–Carmel–Anderson metropolitan statistical area (MSA) ranked eighth among large MSAs in the U.S. for employment concentration in the agricultural feedstock and chemicals sector. According to the Indy Chamber, agribusiness employs more than 16,000 throughout the region. Corteva, one of three Fortune 500 companies headquartered in Indianapolis, is the region's largest employer in this sector, with about 1,500 jobs at the company's Indianapolis Global Business Center.

==== Drugs and pharmaceuticals ====
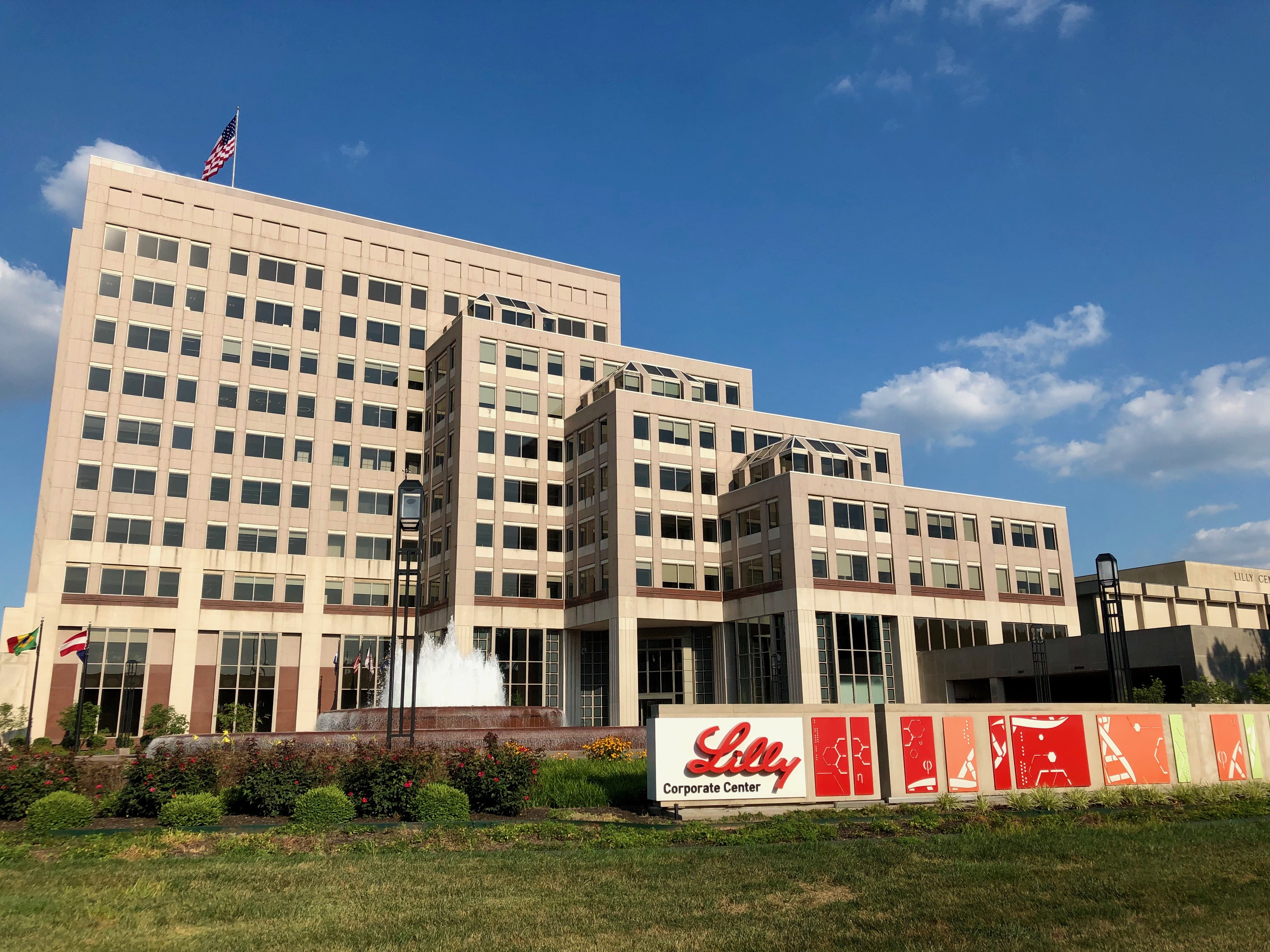
Lilly is the city's largest non-government employer.

In 2020, the Indianapolis–Carmel–Anderson metropolitan statistical area (MSA) had the sixth-highest employment concentration in the drugs and pharmaceuticals sector, rising to second among large MSAs (after the Durham–Chapel Hill MSA).

Indianapolis' life sciences sector is dominated by Eli Lilly and Company, founded by Eli Lilly in 1876. In 2019, the multinational pharmaceutical company was among the largest public companies in the world with revenue topping $22 billion and a global workforce of more than 33,000. Lilly is one of three Fortune 500 companies headquartered in Indianapolis and is the city's largest non-governmental employer with a workforce totaling nearly 11,000 in research and development, manufacturing, and executive administration. The company is deeply rooted in the city's civic and philanthropic fabric. Established in 1937 by Josiah K. Lilly Sr. and his two sons, Eli and Joe, the Lilly Endowment has grown into one of the world's wealthiest charitable foundations, with assets totaling more than $15 billion.

Elanco, a pharmaceutical company that produces medicines and vaccines for pets and livestock, announced plans in 2020 to invest $300 million in establishing its global headquarters in downtown Indianapolis. The company spun-off from Lilly in 2019. Other notable companies in the region include Novo Nordisk's Research Center Indianapolis, Inc. (NNRCII), established in 2015, and Novartis.

==== Medical devices and equipment ====
Beckman Coulter's Life Sciences division is headquartered in Indianapolis and employs more than 500 in the development and production of precision instruments. In 2015, Cook Regentec (a subsidiary of Bloomington, Indiana-based Cook Group) was founded in the city to develop tools and technology for regenerative medicine, immunotherapy, and 3D bioprinting. In 2020, Cook Group's Cook Medical division announced plans to locate a plant in Indianapolis to manufacture medical devices.

==== Research, testing, and medical laboratories ====
Roche Diagnostics Corporation is among the largest employers in Indianapolis, with a workforce of 4,500 at its North American headquarters on the city's northeast side. Other notable employers in the sector include Inotiv, a contract research organization based in Lafayette, Indiana, and Fortrea.

In 2020, the National Institutes of Health (NIH) awarded grants totaling $213 million to the Indiana University School of Medicine to further research, notably in the fields of Alzheimer's disease and pediatrics. Combining grants across several disciplines, the school ranked fifth in the country in funding from the National Institute on Aging. The school ranks 14th among public medical schools, and 29th overall in total NIH funds awarded nationally.

Formed in 2013, the Indiana Biosciences Research Institute (IBRI) is a nonprofit research and technology organization based in Indianapolis that serves as a conduit between the state's research universities and life science industries. The IBRI is the first industry-led collaborative life sciences research institute in the U.S., focusing on diabetes, metabolic disease, and poor nutrition.

==== Healthcare ====
In 2021, nearly 130,000 Central Indiana residents were employed in healthcare. Indianapolis is home to Indiana University Health, the state's largest healthcare system, with a workforce of 36,000 across 16 hospitals. Community Health Network is another nonprofit hospital system based in the city, employing 16,000 between nine hospitals and 15 urgent care clinics throughout the region. Eskenazi Health is the city's public healthcare system, employing more than 4,500 at Sidney & Lois Eskenazi Hospital and 30 outpatient service sites, receiving nearly 1 million outpatient visits annually.

St. Louis-based Ascension, among the largest nonprofit private healthcare systems in the U.S., employs about 7,100 in Central Indiana, with nearly 2,000 staffed beds and 4 million outpatient visits. Mishawaka, Indiana-based Franciscan Health, another nonprofit private healthcare system, has a regional workforce of 5,300 and 600 staffed beds.

=== Retail trade ===
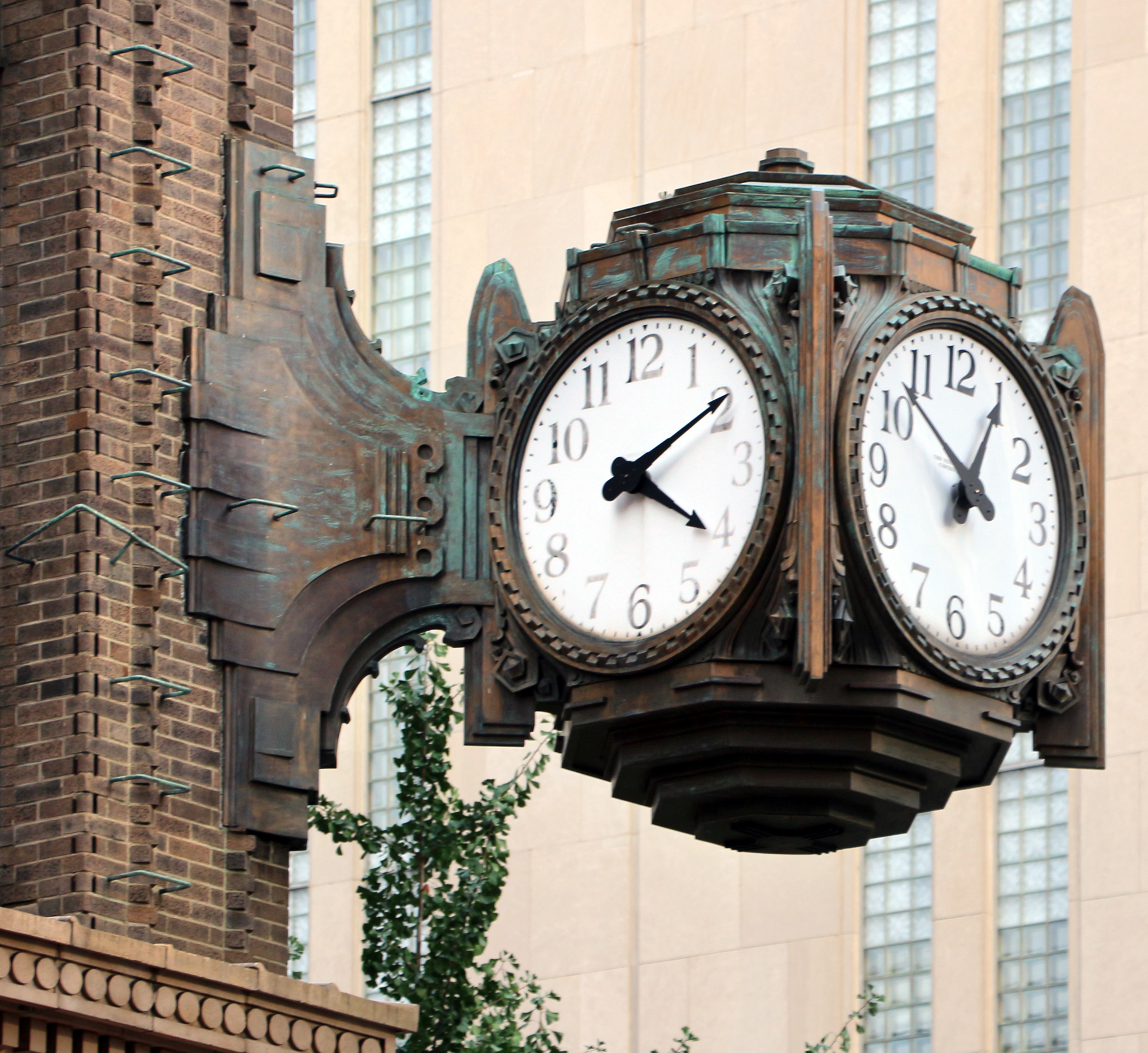
The Ayres Clock at Washington and Meridian streets is a landmark at the former flagship L. S. Ayres department store in downtown Indianapolis. The 1905 building was incorporated into Circle Centre Mall (1995–2025).

Two national retailers are based in Indianapolis. Founded in 1976, Finish Line, Inc. operates more than 500 athletic apparel stores throughout the U.S. The company was acquired as a subsidiary of United Kingdom-based JD Sports in 2018. Founded in 1995, Lids specializes in athletic headwear with more than 1,100 stores throughout the U.S. and Canada.

Four major department stores were based in Indianapolis, including H. P. Wasson and Company (1874–1980), L. S. Ayres (1872–2006), L. Strauss & Co. (1853–1993), and William H. Block Co. (1874–1987). Indianapolis serves as headquarters for two of the largest commercial real estate investment trusts in the U.S., Simon Property Group and Kite Realty Group. Simon's portfolio of more than 200 commercial shopping mall properties in North America and Asia comprises a gross leasable area of some 241,000,000 square feet (22,400,000 m^{2}). Duke Realty manages a portfolio of 550 logistics facilities, primarily used for distribution or e-commerce.

==== Shopping malls ====
Castleton Square is a super-regional mall located on the city's northeast side. Castleton opened in 1972 as the largest enclosed shopping mall in Indiana, boasting 1,381,533 sq ft (128,348.6 m^{2}) of gross leasable area, 130 stores, including five anchor tenants. The nearby Fashion Mall at Keystone opened on the city's north side in 1973 and has since become the region's upscale shopping destination, boasting 120 specialty stores and restaurants covering 710,587 sq ft (66,015.7 m^{2}) of gross leasable area.

Glendale Town Center, also on the city's north side, opened in 1958 as the region's first suburban shopping mall. The center was designed by famed shopping mall architect Victor Gruen. After years of diminishing revenue and competition from nearby Castleton and The Fashion Mall, Glendale was largely remodeled into an open-air power center in the mid-2000s, covering 393,002 square feet (36,511.1 m^{2}) of gross leasable area.

Washington Square, located on the city's far east side, is a super-regional mall opened in 1974. Similar to Lafayette Square, Washington Square has experienced the loss of several national anchor tenants and declining performance in recent years. The mall covers 965,000 sq ft (89,700 m^{2}) of gross leasable area and a single occupied anchor tenant.

Other major shopping malls in the region include lifestyle centers Clay Terrace (2004) and Hamilton Town Center (2008) to the north of Indianapolis in Hamilton County; super-regional mall Greenwood Park (1967) to the south in Johnson County; and lifestyle center The Shops at Perry Crossing (2005) in Hendricks County to the southwest of Indianapolis.

Former shopping malls include Circle Centre (1995–2025) in downtown's Wholesale District, Eastgate (1957–2004), and Lafayette Square (1968–2022).

=== Leisure and hospitality ===
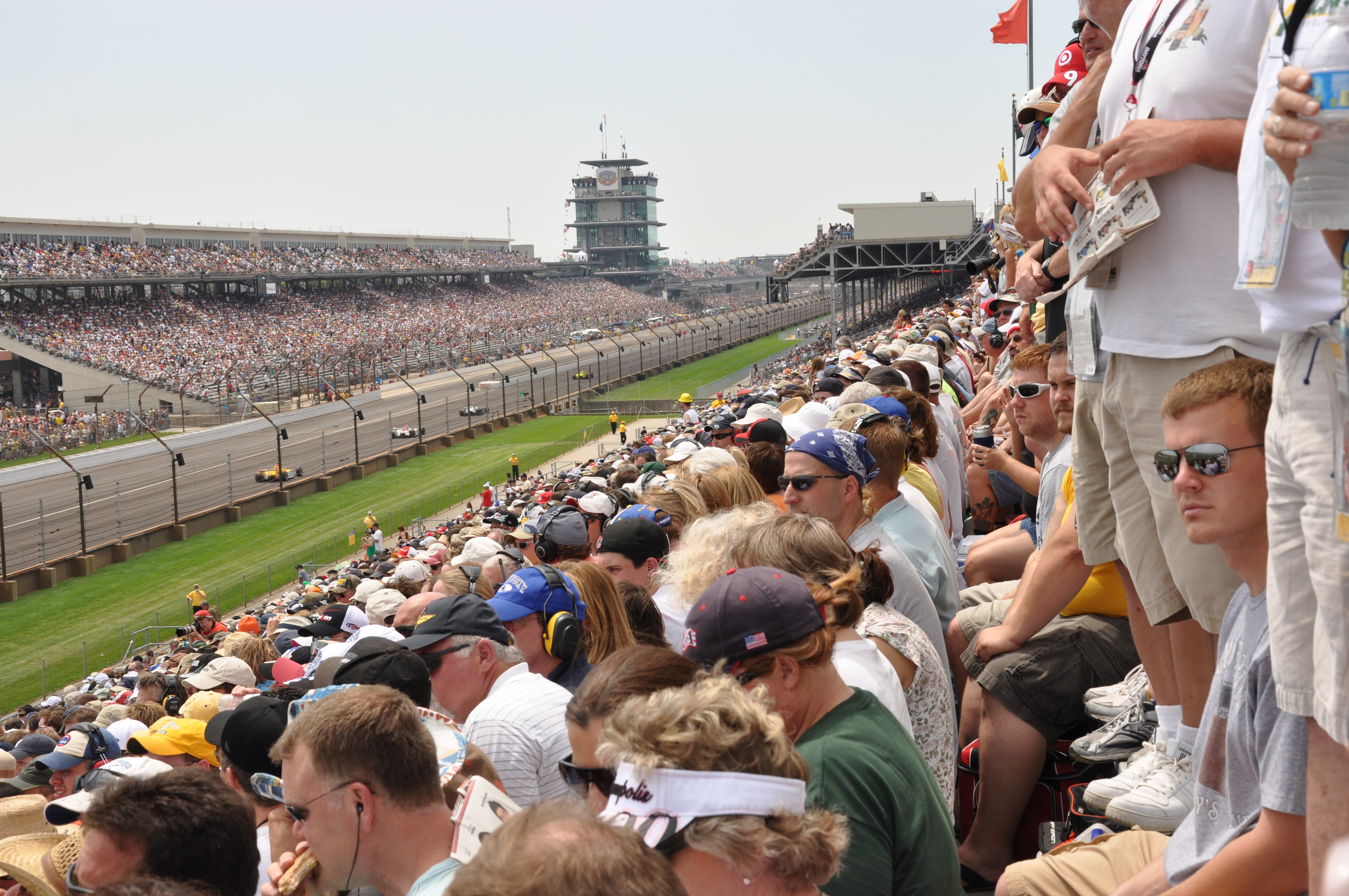
Spectators at the Indianapolis Motor Speedway during the 2011 Indianapolis 500

The city's hospitality industry has grown in importance in recent years due to an expanding convention business. According to the city's destination marketing organization, Indianapolis receives 29.2 million visitors annually, generating $5.6 billion, and supporting 82,900 jobs. The city's major hospitality facilities are clustered in downtown Indianapolis, including the Indiana Convention Center, Lucas Oil Stadium, and some 8,500 hotel rooms. Major annual conventions include FDIC International, the National FFA Organization Convention, Gen Con, and the Performance Racing Industry Trade Show.

In the 1970s, city officials initiated public-private partnerships focused on developing Indianapolis as a sports tourism destination. Since its founding in 1979, the Indiana Sports Corp has hosted more than 450 sporting events of national and international significance in Indianapolis. Indianapolis Motor Speedway (IMS), located in the enclave of Speedway, is the highest-capacity sports venue in the world. IMS hosts numerous motorsports events throughout the year, but is best known as the home of the Indianapolis 500, reputed as the world's largest single-day sporting event. A 2023 report published by Indiana University found that the speedway supported 8,400 jobs and contributed more than $1 billion to the Indianapolis economy. Based on 2023 attendance figures, the city's professional sports teams are among the area's most popular attractions. These include the Indiana Pacers of the National Basketball Association (638,000), the Indianapolis Colts of the National Football League (585,000), and the Indianapolis Indians of Triple-A Minor League Baseball (557,000).

Other popular attractions in the region by 2023 visitation include White River State Park (1.9 million), Horseshoe Indianapolis in Shelbyville (1.6 million), Eagle Creek Park (1.3 million), Harrah's Hoosier Park Racing & Casino in Anderson (1.3 million), the Children's Museum of Indianapolis (1.2 million), Fort Harrison State Park in Lawrence (1.2 million), the Indianapolis Zoo (1.1 million), the Indianapolis Motor Speedway (900,000), the Indiana State Fair (840,000), Newfields (626,000), and Ruoff Music Center in Noblesville (620,000).

=== Manufacturing ===
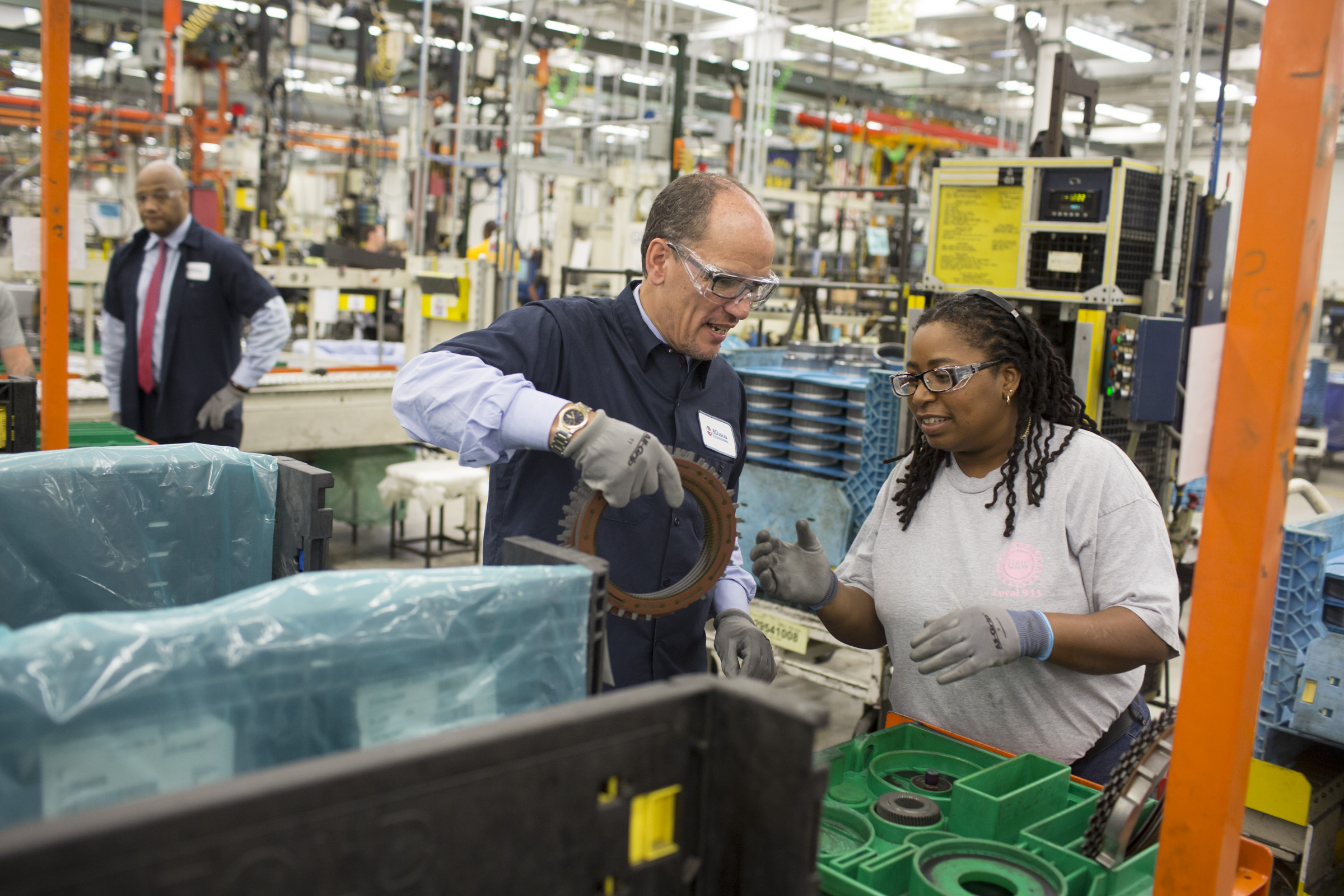
U.S. Secretary of Labor Tom Perez, left, works alongside an employee of Allison Transmission's Indianapolis factory during a tour in 2014.

Allison Transmission designs and produces commercial duty automatic transmissions and hybrid propulsion systems. Its Indianapolis headquarters and manufacturing facilities employ 3,100. Rolls-Royce North America, a subsidiary of United Kingdom-based Rolls-Royce Holdings, dates its local presence to the establishment of the Allison Engine Company in 1915. Its Indianapolis Operations Center has a workforce of 4,000 in aircraft engine development and manufacturing. Other major manufacturing employers in the Indianapolis metropolitan area include Allegion, SMC Corporation, Nestlé, Knauf Insulation, and Linde plc.

Indianapolis is typically considered part of the Rust Belt, a region of the Northeastern and Midwestern U.S. beleaguered by industrial and population decline. In 1990, manufacturing was the city's dominant sector, employing 23% of its workforce; by 2020, the sector had declined to be the city's sixth-largest following the loss of 37,800 manufacturing jobs, most during the Great Recession. In 2016, Carrier Corporation announced the closure of its Indianapolis plant, moving 1,400 manufacturing jobs to Mexico. Other notable former employers in the city's manufacturing sector have included Navistar, P. R. Mallory and Company, Thomson Consumer Electronics, and Western Electric.

==== Automotive industry ====
Once home to 60 automakers, Indianapolis rivaled Detroit as a center of automobile manufacturing and design in the early twentieth century. Indianapolis was home to several luxury car companies, including Duesenberg, Marmon, and Stutz Motor Company; however, the automakers did not survive the Great Depression of the 1930s. Detroit's Big Three automakers maintained a presence in the city and continued to operate in various capacities until the 2000s: Ford Motor Company (1914–1942, 1956–2008), Chrysler (1925–2005), and General Motors (1930–2011).

Former operations include:

- American Motor Car Company (1906–1913)
- Cole Motor Car Company (1909–1925)
- H. C. S. Motor Car Company (1919–1927)
- LaFayette Motors (1919–1922)
- National Motor Vehicle Company (1900–1924)
- Premier Motor Manufacturing Company (1903–1926)

=== Information technology ===
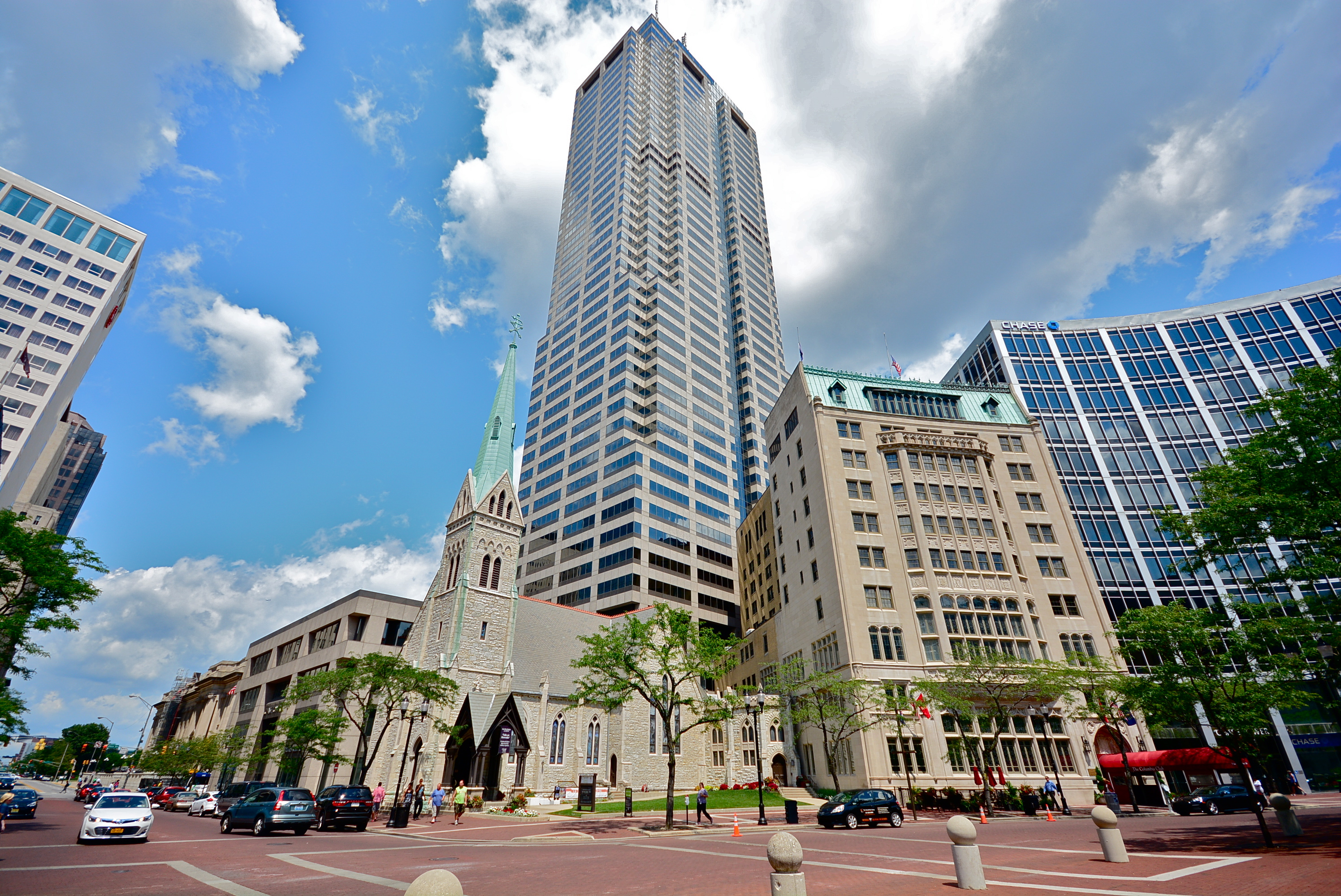
Salesforce Tower

According to real estate tracking firm CBRE Group, Indianapolis ranks among the fastest high-tech job growth areas in the U.S. In 2022, the Indianapolis metropolitan area was home to some 2,275 information technology firms that employed about 24,000. Major employers include Angi, Genesys, Infosys, Salesforce, and Tangoe.

Indianapolis-based ExactTarget, a provider of digital marketing automation and analytics software services, was co-founded in 2000 by local entrepreneurs, Chris Baggot, Scott Dorsey, and Peter McCormick. In 2013, the company was acquired by Salesforce for $2.5 billion. Salesforce has the largest workforce of local tech firms, employing about 2,100 in Indianapolis. In 2016, the company purchased naming rights to Salesforce Tower in downtown Indianapolis, the tallest building in Indiana.

== See also ==
- Companies based in Indianapolis
- Economy of Indiana
- Indianapolis Cultural Districts
