= Greenwood Park Mall =

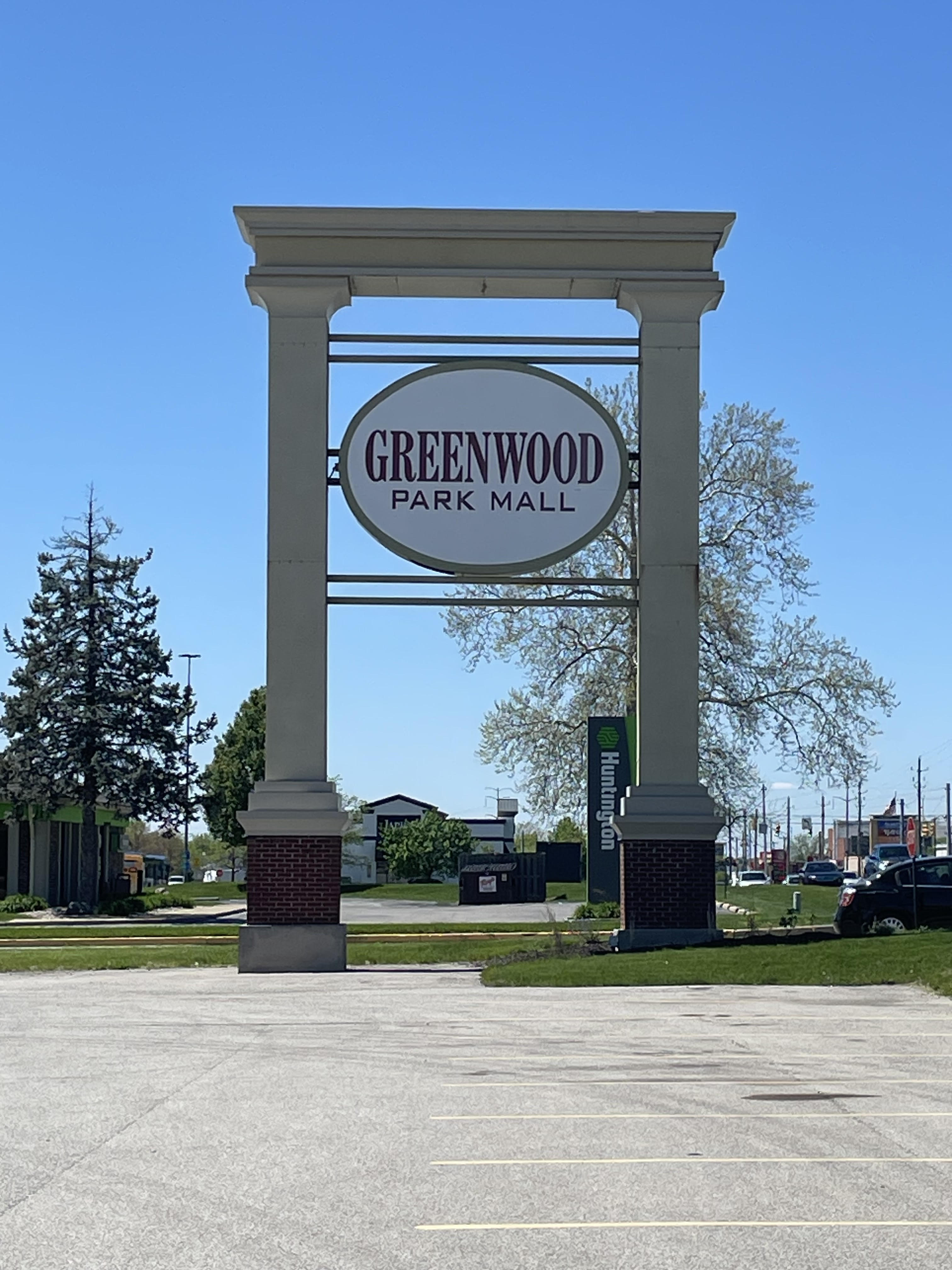
- Sign outside Greenwood Park Mall
- Location: Greenwood, Indiana, United States
- Coordinates: 39.6329°N 86.1205°W
- Opened: 1964
- Developer: Atkinson & Company
- Manager: Simon Property Group
- Owner: Simon Property Group
- Num. of stores: 149
- Num. of anchor tenants: 5
- Floor area: 1,287,869 sq ft (119,646.9 m^{2}).
- Floors: 1 (2 in anchors)
- Parking: surface parking
- Public transit: 31, 90 - Red Line Local
- Website: www.simon.com/mall/greenwood-park-mall

Greenwood Park Mall is a shopping mall located in Greenwood, Indiana. The mall is the hub of the retail and commercial corridor along U.S. Highway 31 on the south side of the Indianapolis Metropolitan Area. As with several other central Indiana shopping centers, Greenwood Park Mall is owned and operated by Simon Property Group.

Greenwood Park Mall has 149 stores. The mall's four anchors are Dick's Sporting Goods, JCPenney, Macy's (originally Lazarus), and Von Maur (originally Blocks, later Montgomery Ward). There is also a Vacant Sears. With 1,287,869 square feet (119,646.9 m^{2}) of total retail area, Greenwood Park Mall is the fourth largest shopping mall in Indiana, after Castleton Square in Indianapolis, Glenbrook Square in Fort Wayne, and Southlake Mall in Merrillville. The mall is managed by Steve Kempe as of 2022. There was also a JCPenney Home Store located near Macy's, which was a former Woolworth.

== History ==
Built on an 87-acre (350,000 m^{2}) site by Atkinson & Company at a cost of $25 million, the Greenwood Shopping Center opened in 1965. In 1977, Melvin Simon & Associates purchased the mall for an undisclosed amount of money, and in 1980, it was reopened as the Greenwood Park Mall following a renovation and expansion. By 1990, an average of 10 million shoppers a year (about 28,000 a day) were patronizing the Greenwood Park Mall. The interior walking space area, not including the leased retail spaces, encompasses a total of 1,000,000 square feet (93,000 m^{2}) of area. It is currently the only mall in metropolitan Indianapolis to retain its Old Navy store, as the Lafayette Square, Washington Square, Circle Centre, Castleton Square, Speedway Supercenter and Glendale Mall locations have closed. Dick's Sporting Goods opened in 2005, taking a former Service Merchandise site.

On October 27, 1994, a Lowe's Home Improvement store opened north of Greenwood Park Mall.

TGI Fridays officially opened at the mall on October 12, 1998. Old Navy opened on February 2, 2000.

In 2003, Greenwood Park Mall underwent its first major renovation since becoming an enclosed shopping mall in 1980. This renovation eliminated many of the components of the park theme for which the mall was named. Live plants and trees, park-style benches, and outdoor-style lampposts around the interior of the mall were eliminated in favor of a more modern and upscale design. The plaza-style design of the food court was also eliminated in favor of a more open layout. In addition to interior changes, exterior entrances to the mall were also revamped at this time. By Spring 2004, work on the mall had been completed. Despite minor changes to the interior of the mall, Greenwood Park Mall currently maintains the appearance it received in the 2003 renovation.

Macy's owned both Lazarus and L.S Ayres, so they chose to rebrand the Lazarus space into Macy's, leaving behind the L.S. Ayres store which would liquidate and close down.

In 2007, the building formerly occupied by L.S. Ayres was demolished, and a lifestyle center was constructed on the site. This expansion increased gross leasable area by 115,000 square feet (10,700 m^{2}). The lifestyle center officially opened on November 8, 2007.

On October 15, 2018, it was announced that Sears would be closing as part of a plan to close 142 stores nationwide.

In 2019, it was announced that a Dave & Buster's would be occupying the former JCPenney Home Store. The 34,500 square feet (3,210 m^{2}) restaurant and event space facility opened on November 15, 2020.

=== 2022 shooting ===
On July 17, 2022, three people were killed and two others wounded after a mass shooting occurred at the mall's food court. The gunman was subsequently shot and killed by a legally armed bystanding civilian.

== See also ==
- Economy of Indianapolis
- List of Simon Property Group properties
- List of shopping malls in the United States
