= Century Plaza (disambiguation) =

The Century Plaza was a shopping mall in Birmingham, Alabama.

Century Plaza may also refer to:

- The Century Plaza Towers in Los Angeles
- The Century Plaza Hotel in Los Angeles
- Century Mall in Merrillville, Indiana
- The Century Plaza South Tower, the former name of the Suzhou Zhongnan Center in Suzhou, Jiangsu, China
