= Clay Terrace =

Shopping mall in Carmel, Indiana, US

- Location: Carmel, Indiana
- Coordinates: 39.997°N 86.129°W
- Address: 14390 Clay Terrace Blvd
- Opened: 2004
- Developer: Simon Property Group
- Owner: Hines Global Income Trust
- Num. of stores: 78
- Num. of anchor tenants: 5
- Floor area: 500,000 sq ft (46,000 m^{2})
- Floors: 1
- Website: clayterrace.com

Clay Terrace is a community lifestyle center in Carmel, Indiana. Opened in 2004, it is managed by Hines Global Income Trust.

== History ==
Clay Terrace opened in 2004. It, Jefferson Pointe in Fort Wayne, and Metropolis in Plainfield were the first three lifestyle centers in Indiana. Among the first stores announced for it were Dick's Sporting Goods, Wild Oats Market and DSW. Aeropostale closed January 27, 2015, making the Clay Terrace location the only one in central Indiana to close. Delia's, New York & co., Paradise Bakery, and the Children's Place all closed around the same time.

Wild Oats became Whole Foods. Old Navy was added in 2007, relocating from Merchants' Square. Circuit City closed in 2008. On June 17, 2014, it was announced that Simon Property Group spinoff Washington Prime had acquired Clay Terrace in addition to six other shopping centers. On December 10, 2025, it was announced that Hines a global real estate investment manager had acquired Clay Terrace.

== See also ==
- Economy of Indianapolis
