= Hamilton Town Center =

- Location: Noblesville, Indiana, United States
- Coordinates: 39.990855°N 85.931910°W
- Address: 13901 Town Center Blvd
- Opened: 2008
- Developer: Simon Property Group
- Manager: Simon Property Group
- Owner: Simon Property Group (50%)
- Num. of stores: 99
- Num. of anchor tenants: 9
- Floor area: 672,896 square feet (62,514.1 square meters)
- Floors: 1
- Website: www.simon.com/mall/hamilton-town-center

Hamilton Town Center is a retail lifestyle center in Noblesville, Indiana, United States. Opened in 2008, it is managed by Simon Property Group, who owns 50% of it.

== History ==
The center opened in 2008 with Dick's Sporting Goods, J. C. Penney, Bed Bath & Beyond, Borders Books & Music (closed 2011), Designer Shoe Warehouse, Ulta, Stein Mart, and Squeeze Play are among its anchor stores. Bed Bath & Beyond and J. C. Penney predated the mall's opening by several months. Borders closed in 2011 and was replaced by an Earth Fare organic supermarket, which has also since closed.

== See also ==
- List of Simon Property Group properties
- Economy of Indianapolis
