= Century Mall =

- Location: Merrillville, Indiana, United States
- Coordinates: 41.469993°N 87.334796°W
- Address: 8275 Broadway
- Opened: 1975
- Closed: 2006 (demolished 2007)
- Developer: Bass Financial
- Owner: Tri-Land Properties
- Num. of anchor tenants: 2 (1975-1981, 1994-2006); 3 (1981-1994)
- Floor area: 415,138 square feet (38,567.6 m^{2})
- Floors: 1

Century Mall was an indoor shopping mall located on the southeast corner of Broadway (Indiana 53) and US 30 in Merrillville, Indiana, United States. The mall opened in 1975 with anchor stores Goldblatt's and Montgomery Ward. Competitive and economic factors sent the mall into steady decline and national retail chains left throughout the 1990s until the mall was ultimately sold for redevelopment in 2006 then closed and largely demolished in 2007. The mall's interior stores also suffered following Montgomery Ward's remodeling. Montgomery Ward removed their mall entrance and told customers that no stores remained, when in reality close to a dozen stores were still open. A strip mall development named Century Plaza now occupies the land and some of the former anchor store buildings.

== History ==
The mall broke ground in September 1977. Developed by Bass Financial of Los Angeles, California, it was set to feature two Chicago-based department stores as the anchor stores: Montgomery Ward and Goldblatt's.

Between its 1975 opening and 1982, it was only 70 percent leased. Simon Property Group bought the mall in August 1982, a day before Goldblatt's filed for Chapter 11 bankruptcy and closed its store there. Simon then split the Goldblatt building among Burlington Coat Factory and Service Merchandise. The company also converted the mall to an off-price and discount-oriented concept, similar to what it had done at Eastgate Mall in Indianapolis, Indiana and Arborland Center in Ann Arbor, Michigan.

A small food court was located near the south side of the mall, located near the long corridor leading to Service Merchandise and Burlington Coat Factory. The food court contained many small local restaurants, but also included a Schoop's Hamburgers and a Subway. The mall at one time housed R-Way, a drug store located on the north side, just outside Montgomery Ward. Outlot buildings include (or included at one time) White Castle, Shakey's Pizza, Checkers Drive-in and a Shell gas station.

In 1990, in cooperation with the Northwest Indiana Walkers, Century Mall opened the interior of the mall to accommodate mall walkers.

Despite the initial success of the off-price format, the mall continued its economic decline. Service Merchandise relocated in 1995 to a new store roughly half a mile away at the Crossings at Hobart shopping center. Burlington Coat Factory then expanded into the former Service Merchandise space. The Montgomery Ward anchor store closed in June 2001 when the entire chain filed for bankruptcy. Century Mall and the surrounding land were purchased by Tri-Land Properties in June 2006 with the intent to convert the space to a power center.

== Century Plaza ==
Under mall's new ownership, all of the then-current tenants relocated with the exception of Burlington Coat Factory. The central enclosed portion of the mall was demolished leaving only the Burlington Coat Factory and former Montgomery Wards stores standing. In June 2007, the shopping center was renamed Century Plaza to reflect the new configuration of the retail space. Developed as a strip mall with a series of big box retailers, Century Plaza now includes a small variety of national chain shops and eateries, with Old Time Pottery in the former Montgomery Ward. In January 2012, a 20,400 square feet (1,895.2 m^{2}) Staples office supply store opened. In November 2017, Burlington Coat Factory moved to the nearby Crossings at Hobart and the anchor remains vacant.

== See also ==
- List of shopping malls in the United States
