= Jefferson Pointe =

Lifestyle center in Fort Wayne, Indiana, U.S.

Jefferson Pointe Shopping Center
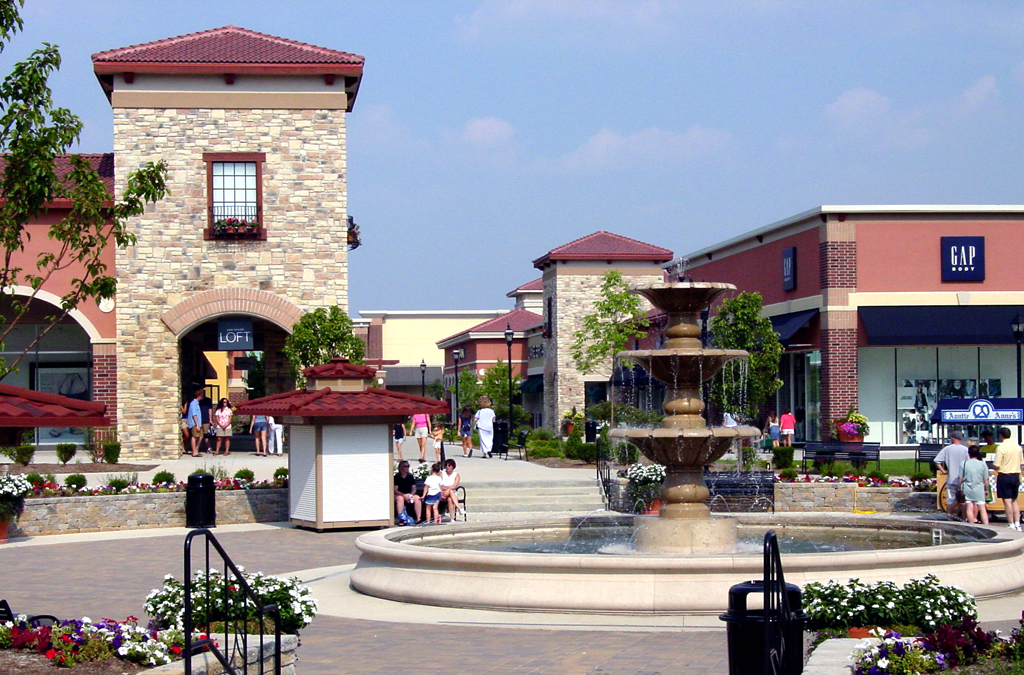
- Jefferson Pointe
- Location: 4110 W Jefferson Blvd. D-5; Fort Wayne, Indiana, 46804; United States
- Coordinates: 41°4′19.8″N 85°11′50.3″W
- Opened: August 2001
- Developer: RED Development
- Manager: United Commercial Realty
- Owner: RED Development, LLC
- Architect: Klover Architects
- Num. of stores: 60+
- Num. of anchor tenants: 4
- Floor area: 650,000 square feet (60,000 m^{2})
- Floors: 1 (2 in Von Maur)
- Public transit: Citilink
- Website: www.reddevelopment.com/jefferson-pointe/

Jefferson Pointe Shopping Center is an open-air lifestyle center in Fort Wayne, Indiana. Jefferson Pointe covers the wedge of land bordered between Apple Glen Boulevard, West Jefferson Boulevard, and Illinois Road on the southwest side of Fort Wayne. Major tenants include Burlington Coat Factory, Bed Bath & Beyond, AMC Theatres IMAX, Marshalls, Michaels, and Von Maur. The center was originally developed by RED Development, but is currently managed by UCR CBRE. Phase one of the center opened in 2001, with the second phase opening a year later. Upon opening, a small number of stores with a presence at Glenbrook Square such as Victoria's Secret, Buckle, GameStop, Justice, Aéropostale, Motherhood Maternity, Francescas, Payless ShoeSource, and Bath & Body Works opened second Fort Wayne locations at Jefferson Pointe. Most stayed, but some like The Children's Place, American Eagle Outfitters, and Lane Bryant went back to strictly locating at Glenbrook. Dress Barn, Christopher & Banks and Barnes & Noble eventually moved to the new Orchard Crossing strip center. Despite these losses, occupancy at Jefferson Pointe remains high, with recent additions like Marshalls, Petshion Boutique, The Nut House, White House Black Market, a relocated Old Navy, and an art gallery.

Jefferson Pointe was home to the first Barnes & Noble, Panera Bread, and Ulta Beauty in Fort Wayne. The center also houses the only IMAX theater in the region, which was added in 2011, and is home to the first Vera Bradley company-owned store in Indiana (Fort Wayne is home to the brand). Jefferson Pointe also features market-exclusive stores for Chico's, Eddie Bauer, White House Black Market, Soma Intimates, Bed Bath & Beyond, LOFT, and Talbots.

From the center's opening until 2012, Jefferson Pointe had a small food court. However, it was not popular as Jefferson Pointe had many other dining options in and surrounding the center. The food court was replaced by Tucanos Brazilian Grill and a children's play area. Other restaurants at Jefferson Pointe include Biaggi's, Smokey Bones, Flat Top Grill, Cold Stone Creamery, McAlister's Deli, Hardee's, Chick-fil-A, Eddie Merlot's, and Beer Barrel Pizza.

Because of its location across Apple Glen Boulevard, Apple Glen Crossing is often considered to be a part of Jefferson Pointe, even though it is not and has different owners. This strip center is anchored by Walmart, Kohl's, Best Buy, and PetSmart.
