= Glendale Town Center =

Power center in Indianapolis, Indiana

Coordinates: 39°51′58″N 86°07′09″W

- Location: Indianapolis, Indiana, U.S.
- Address: 6101 North Keystone Avenue
- Opened: August 14, 1958; 68 years ago
- Renovated: 1970 (enclosed); 2000–2008 (de-malling)
- Developer: Howard M. Landau
- Manager: Kite Realty Group
- Owner: Glendale Centre LLC
- Architect: Victor Gruen, DKGR
- Num. of stores: 40
- Num. of anchor tenants: 4
- Floor area: 177,000 square feet (16,400 m^{2})
- Floors: 3
- Parking: surface parking
- Public transit: 19, 26, 82
- Website: https://kiterealty.com/properties/glendale-town-center

Glendale Town Center (originally Glendale Shopping Center and formerly known as Glendale Mall) is a power center in Indianapolis, Indiana, United States. It is situated between North Keystone Avenue and North Rural Street, about 7 miles (11 km) north of downtown in the city's Glendale neighborhood.

As of May 2026, notable tenants included Target, Ross Dress for Less, Old Navy, Five Below, and Indiana University Health. Outlots included eateries like Buffalo Wild Wings, Culver's, Panda Express, and Panera Bread.

== History ==
Glendale Shopping Center was planned in 1955 by Howard M. Landau, along with representatives of William H. Block Co. and L. S. Ayres, two Indianapolis-based department stores which would serve as the mall's anchor stores. Each department store was to be positioned at the opposite end of a mall concourse which would contain about 45 stores in total. The site chosen for the mall was along Keystone Avenue at 62nd Street. Representatives of the William H. Block Co. chain said that they felt that the location was suitably positioned for the city's growth at the time, and that having both department stores in the same center would offer a greater shopping variety for customers. Victor Gruen was the mall's architect.

When the 685,000-square-foot (63,600 m^{2}) Glendale Shopping Center opened, it was the premier retail center in Indianapolis and boasted an impressive array of upscale retailers. It was converted to a covered mall in the 1960s. Until Glendale's construction, most major department stores in Indianapolis were located only in the Downtown district. Glendale was frequently the first local branch store away from the established flagship locations downtown.

Following the opening of The Fashion Mall at Keystone two miles (3.2 km) north, Glendale began to lose many of its better-known tenants. The original mall was demolished March 1, 2007. New construction and design returned it to being an open-air shopping center in early 2008.

The complex is currently owned by Kite Realty.

== See also ==
- Economy of Indianapolis
- List of attractions and events in Indianapolis
- List of shopping malls in the United States
