= Eastgate Consumer Mall =

Shopping mall in Indianapolis, Indiana, US (1957–2004)

Coordinates: 39°46′33.7″N 86°02′34.3″W

- Location: Indianapolis, Indiana, U.S.
- Address: 7150 East Washington Street
- Opened: 1957
- Closed: 2004
- Previous names: Eastgate Shopping Center
- Developer: Eastgate Corporation
- Num. of stores: 50+
- Num. of anchor tenants: 3
- Floor area: 483,185 square feet (44,889.4 m^{2})
- Floors: 1

Eastgate Consumer Mall, originally Eastgate Shopping Center, was a shopping mall located in Indianapolis, Indiana, United States, at the corner of Washington Street and Shadeland Avenue. It was originally an outdoor mall featuring Sears, JCPenney, and H. P. Wasson and Company; a re-development in 1981 changed it from a conventional shopping center to an outlet mall. After years of decline, the mall closed for business in 2004 and was re-purposed as industrial space.

== History ==
The mall was constructed in 1957 as Eastgate Shopping Center, and had anchor stores such as Sears, JCPenney, and H. P. Wasson and Company. Wasson's was the first store to be confirmed as a tenant, having announced plans to build the store in 1954. The mall's developers were collectively known as Eastgate Corporation, a group of Indianapolis-based businessmen of which real estate developer Albert L. Frankel was president. This group's research determined the intersection of Washington Street (then part of US 40) and Shadeland Avenue on the city's east side to be the ideal location for a shopping mall, due to its proximity to projected population growth and a proliferation of industrial development around the site.

In 1972, the formerly open-air mall underwent a conversion to an enclosed property. This was done to make it more competitive with other, newer malls that had been developed in the area in the intervening years, such as Washington Square Mall to the east. Three years later, the mall's then-owners, Equitable Life Assurance of America, announced further renovation plans that included new flooring and carpeting throughout the concourses, along with the addition of greenery and renovations to the property's exterior.

A renovation in 1982 by Melvin Simon & Associates (now Simon Property Group) shifted the mall's focus to off-price and outlet stores. Despite the craft stores and Burlington still being there, the tenants were notified in March 2004 that the mall would close on June 30, 2004.

== Building re-use ==
The facility was sold in 2008 to Lifeline Data Centers, an Indianapolis-based data storage company. In 2010, Lifeline allowed Indiana Department of Public Safety to take some of the building up, reportedly an emergency center. In 2013, the Department of Public Safety left the building. In 2013, Chicago-based New Generation Power International partnered with Lifeline to install a 1 megawatt solar farm on the facility.

== See also ==
- Economy of Indianapolis
- List of shopping malls in the United States
