= Leighton School of Nursing =

Private nursing school in Indianapolis, Indiana, US

Coordinates: 39°48′38″N 86°12′10″W

The Leighton School of Nursing
- Indianapolis, Indiana; Nashville, Tennessee

Information
- School type: Private, Non-profit
- Motto: Sedes Sapientiae (Seat of Wisdom)
- Established: 1851
- Category: Nursing School
- Accreditation: CCNE

The Alan and Sue Leighton School of Nursing is part of Marian University, a private, non-profit school located in Indianapolis, Indiana.

Established in 1977 as the Marian College School of Nursing, the school has been housed in the Michael A. Evans Center for Health Sciences on the university's main campus since 2013. It shares the building with the Marian University College of Osteopathic Medicine.

Part of Marian University, the Leighton School of Nursing frames its curriculum within the context of the Catholic Franciscan values of the university's founders, the Sisters of St. Francis, Oldenburg, Indiana. As such, the curricula for all its programs are designed to teach nursing students how to take a holistic approach to patient care.

== History ==
Louis C. Gatto, Ph.D., who served as president of Marian College from 1971 to 1989, pushed for the development and implementation of an LPN-to-associate degree in nursing. The program launched with curriculum approval from the Indiana State Board of Nursing (ISBN) in 1977. Gatto also supported the launch of the college's four-year Bachelor of Science degree in nursing, which started in 1987 with ISBN approval. The National League for Nursing has also accredited both programs — the associate in 1986 and the baccalaureate in 1992.

The Leighton School of Nursing has added other baccalaureate, masters and doctoral nursing programs throughout the years. It began offering an on-campus accelerated program in 1994, and launched an online-based accelerated BSN program in 2009. The online-based accelerated nursing program in Nashville received approval by the Tennessee Higher Education Commission and the Tennessee Board of Nursing in 2014 and began classes May 12, 2014. Both the Indianapolis and Nashville ABSN programs have clinical partnerships with area hospitals: St. Vincent in Indianapolis and Ascension Saint Thomas in Nashville.

In more recent years, it added The School of Nursing's Master of Science in Nursing Education program at the start of the 2016–17 academic year and a Doctor of Nursing Practice program, which began in May 2017.

== Affiliations and accreditation ==
The Leighton School of Nursing is accredited at the national, regional, and state levels. Marian University is accredited by the Higher Learning Commission (HLC). The Leighton School of Nursing meets the approval of the Indiana State Board of Nursing (ISBN); all its baccalaureate programs are accredited by the Commission on Collegiate Nursing Education (CCNE).

== Programs ==
Marian University's Leighton School of Nursing offers various paths for earning a nursing degree.

=== Undergraduate ===
- Bachelor of Science in Nursing (BSN) program is a four-year program that was launched in 1987 after the Indiana Board of Nursing approved the associate and baccalaureate programs
- The Accelerated Bachelor of Science in Nursing (ABSN)
- RN to BSN program

=== Graduate ===
- Master of Science in Nursing Education
- Doctor of Nursing Practice (DNP)
