= Washington Square Mall (Indianapolis) =

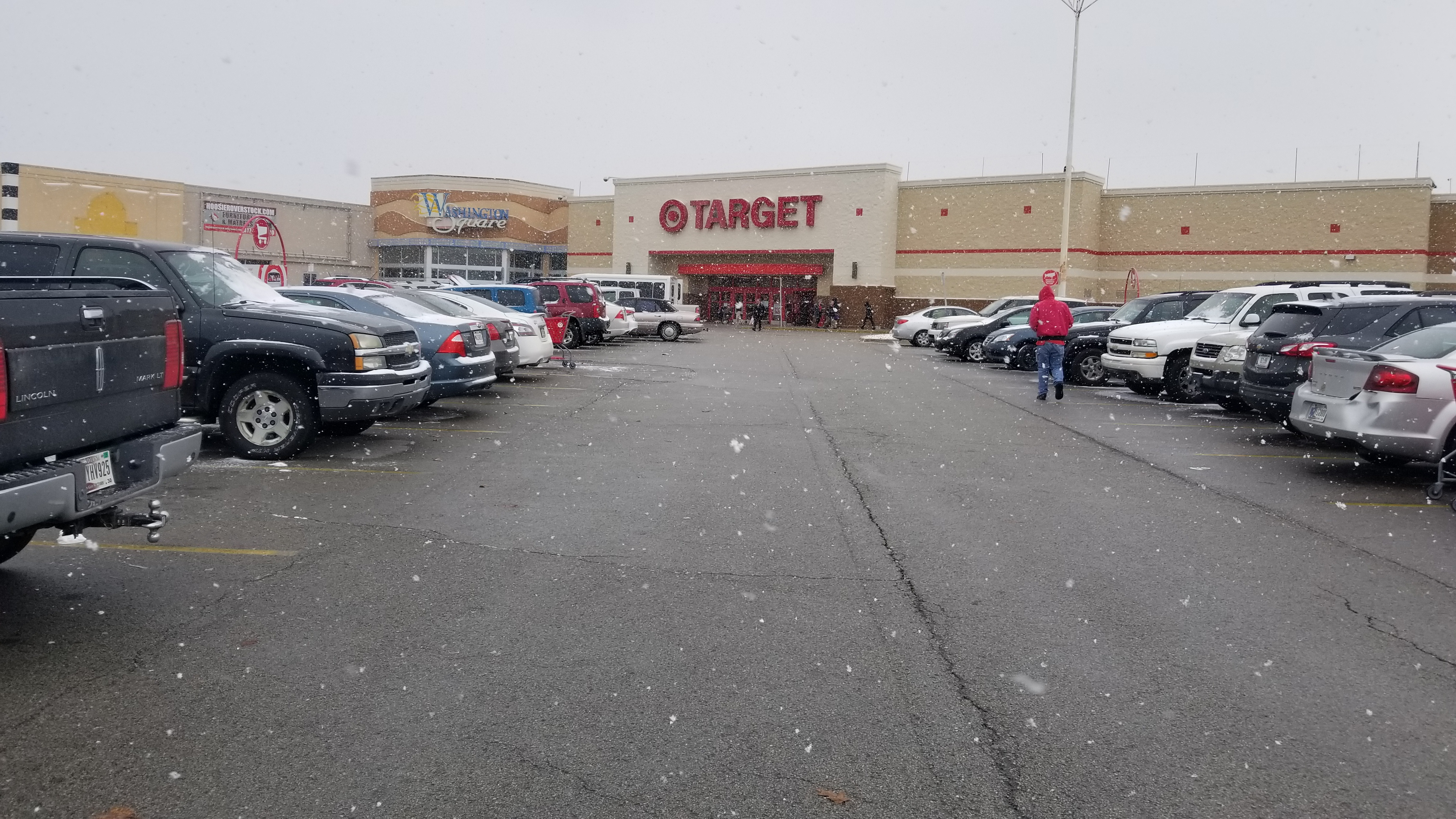
- Washington Square Mall entrance in 2018
- Location: Indianapolis, Indiana, United States
- Coordinates: 39.777°N 85.988°W
- Opened: October 17, 1974; 52 years ago
- Developer: Edward J. DeBartolo Corp.
- Manager: JLL Properties
- Owner: Durga Property LLC
- Num. of stores: 80+ (10 open)
- Num. of anchor tenants: 5 (1 open, 4 vacant)
- Floor area: 965,000 square feet (89,700 m^{2})
- Floors: 1(2 in former Sears and former Macy's)
- Parking: surface parking

Washington Square Mall is a super-regional shopping mall located on the eastern side of Indianapolis. It opened in 1974 and was partially renovated in 1999. Today, the mall consists mostly of local stores and Target, as well as AMC Washington Square 12.

== History ==
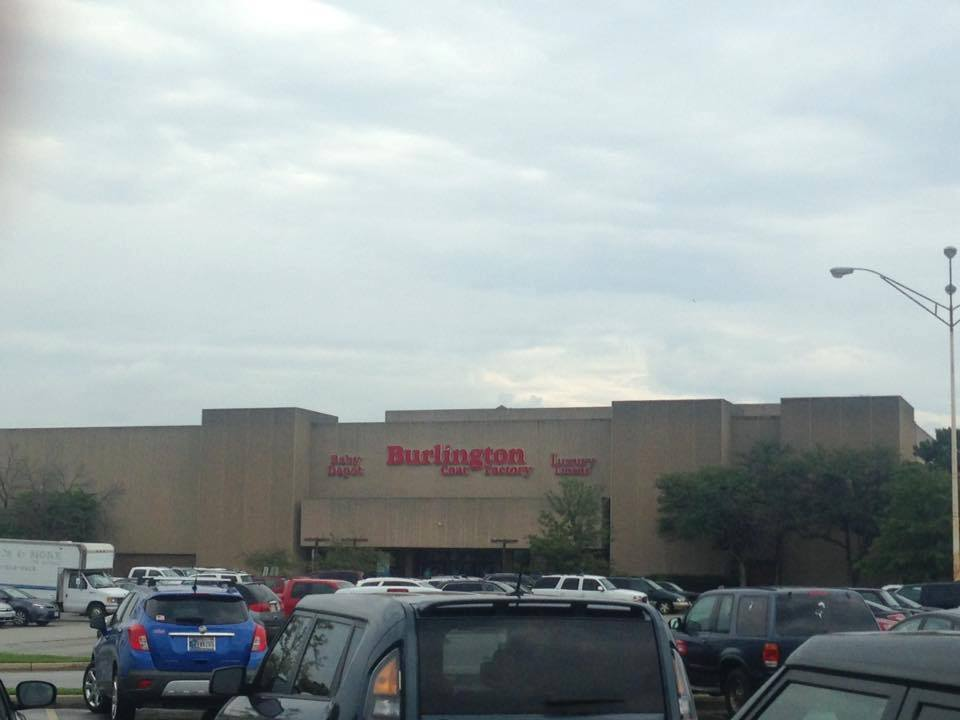
Burlington's location at Washington Square, a former JCPenney, as seen in 2016. The store closed in 2020.

The mall was built by Edward J. DeBartolo Sr. as the third of three malls that were part of his company's expansion into Indianapolis, following Lafayette Square Mall in 1968 and Castleton Square Mall in 1972. Opening on October 17, 1974, it supplanted Eastgate Shopping Center three miles to the west, which had opened in 1957. The mall originally opened with L. S. Ayres and Block's. JCPenney opened for business on April 30, 1975. The Sears store opened for business on August 14, 1975. Lazarus opened for business on August 3, 1978. JCPenney and Sears moved from the Eastgate Shopping Center to Washington Square.

In 1987, Block's closed and became Montgomery Ward in 1988. Simon Property Group merged with the DeBartolo company in 1996. Simon renovated the mall in 1999, changing the front entrance and multiple skylights, carpeting the anchor entrances, and adding Target in place of Montgomery Ward.

The mall has faced a steady decline since the mid-2000s, with several stores pulling out or closing. Despite this, Dick's Sporting Goods was built on the former site of Lazarus in 2005, as well as an AMC adjacent to the mall. Burlington also began occupying the former JCPenney at this time. Multiple tenants, first Indy Wholesale Furniture, have moved into the space formerly occupied by L. S. Ayres/Macy's. In February 2013, Indy Wholesale Furniture announced that it would be going out of business, leaving one of the five anchor spots vacant. In early 2014, Washington Square lost BonWorth, Rack Room Shoes, MCL, and Foot Locker, with the former three all closing and the latter moving to Cherry Tree Plaza a mile west.

By 2013, occupancy slipped under 50 percent but came back to 85 or 90 percent when the mall went to a new owner. On September 29, 2014, it was announced that Sears would be closing in December 2014.

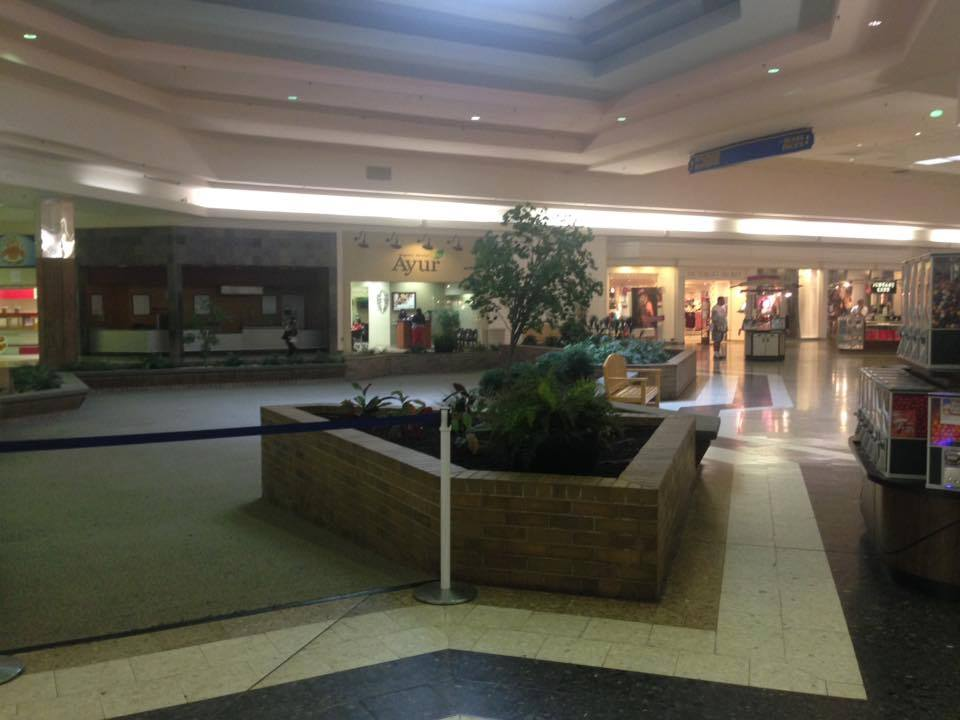
The mall's interior in 2016.

In August 2014, Simon handed over management of the property to Jones Lang LaSalle.

In 2016, the mall was purchased by Kohan Retail Investment Group for $2.5 million and new management was put in place. The new property owner began neglecting not only the property taxes on Washington Square Mall but also the upkeep of the mall as well. The mall then lost Aeropostale in early 2016, as well as Buffalo Wild Wings in mid-2018. Management had trouble keeping up with garbage collection, maintenance, and other basic needs of the mall when Kohan stopped payments to Washington Square. All things considered, the mall kept occupancy at a reasonable rate, with small businesses and family-owned shops filling empty spaces.

In October 2018, Washington Square Mall was put up for auction due to unpaid property taxes. The mall was subsequently purchased by Durga Property, LLC. On January 1, 2020, it was announced that two of the mall's remaining three anchors, Dick's Sporting Goods and Burlington Coat Factory, would be departing the mall, leaving Target as the lone name-brand anchor; Target, however, has no mall access as of 2020. Bath & Body Works joined Foot Locker at Cherry Tree Plaza in late 2022, vacating its space in Washington Square Mall. A discount store, Chacharas Chuchin, currently occupies the former Dick's, and Furniture House is in the former Macy's. As of 2025, the mall has eleven operating stores (including anchors) and four kiosks, with Remo Men's Wear set to move out.

== Gallery ==
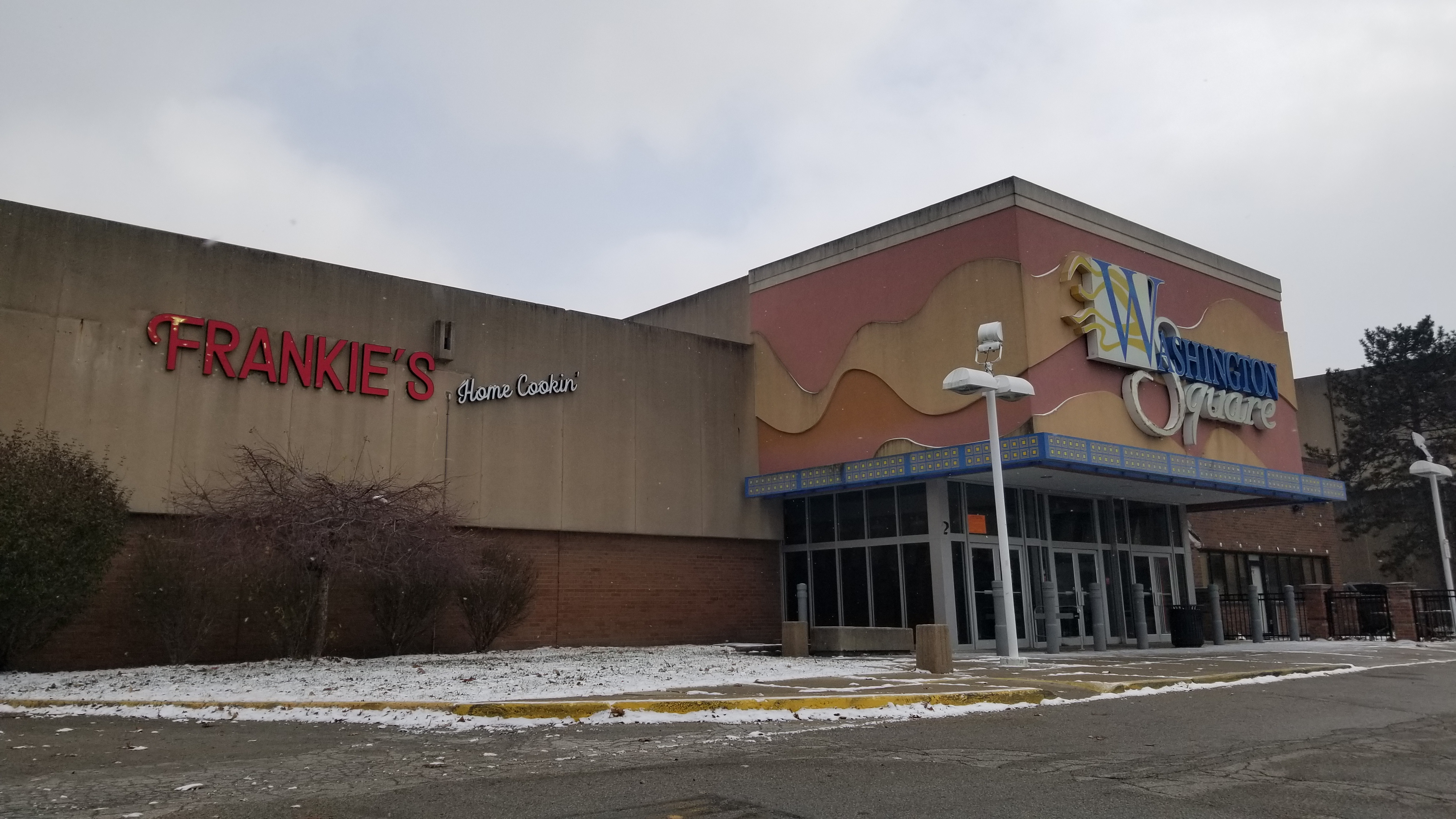
Entrance

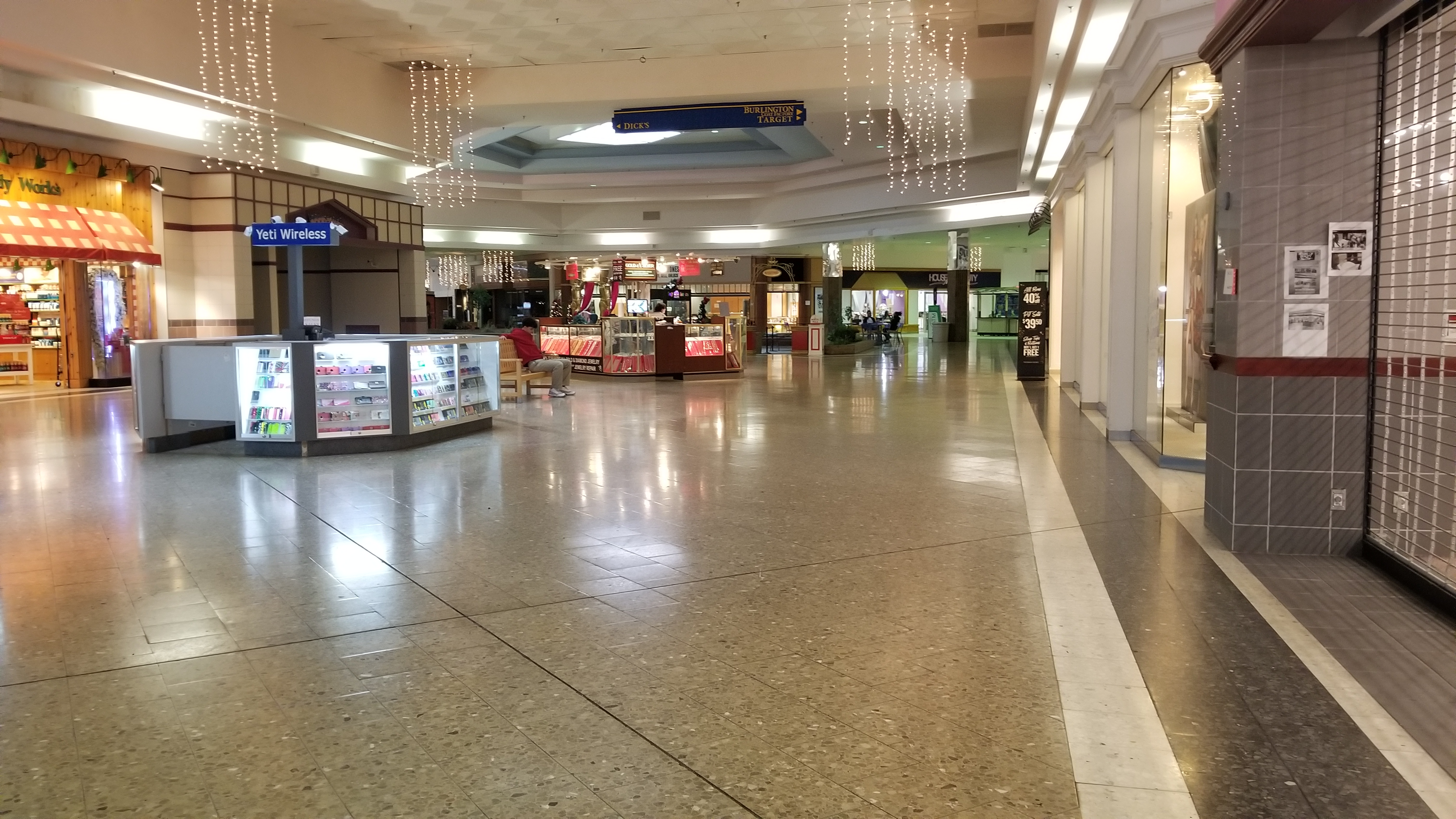
A shot of the interior

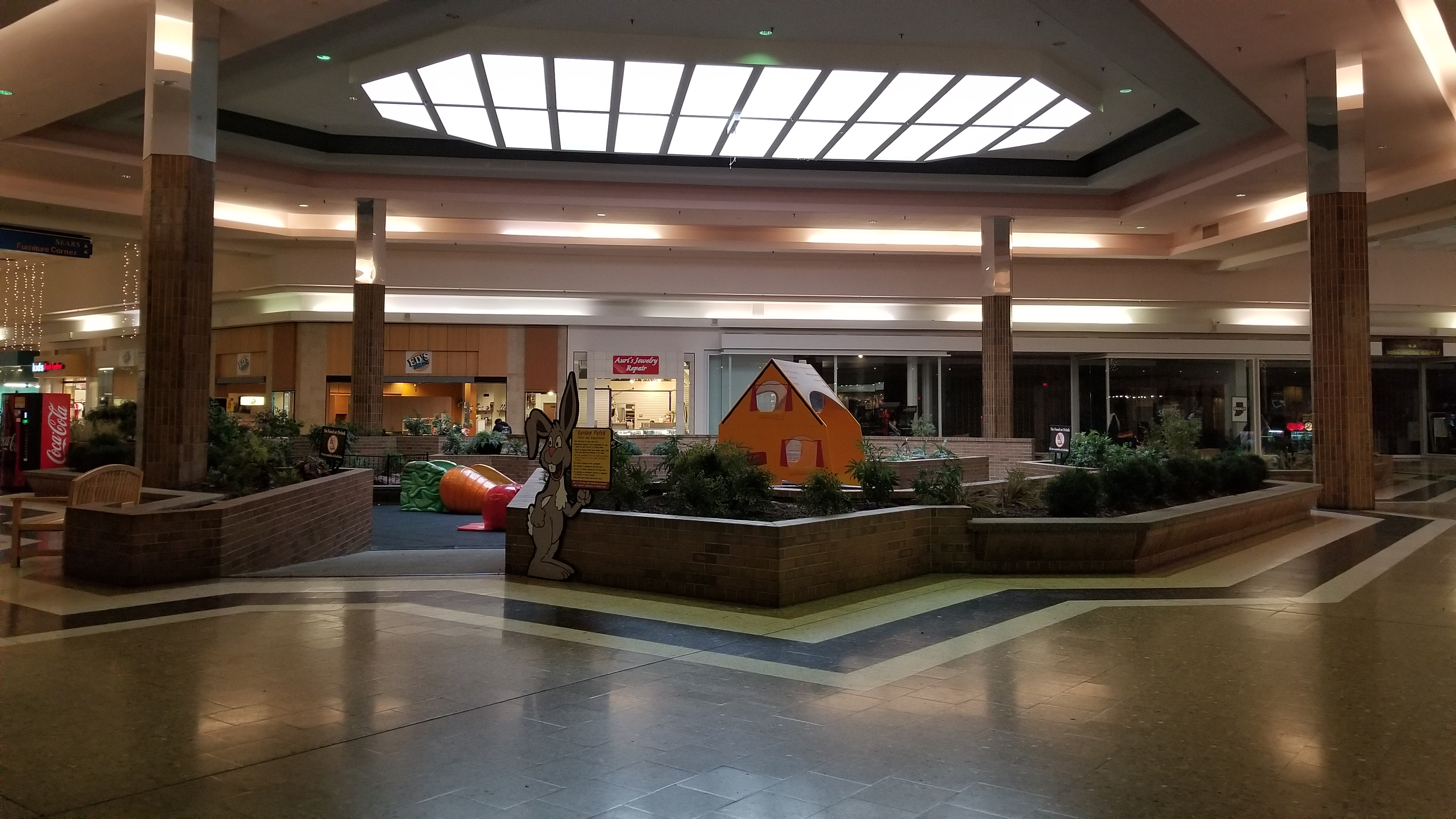
Playground

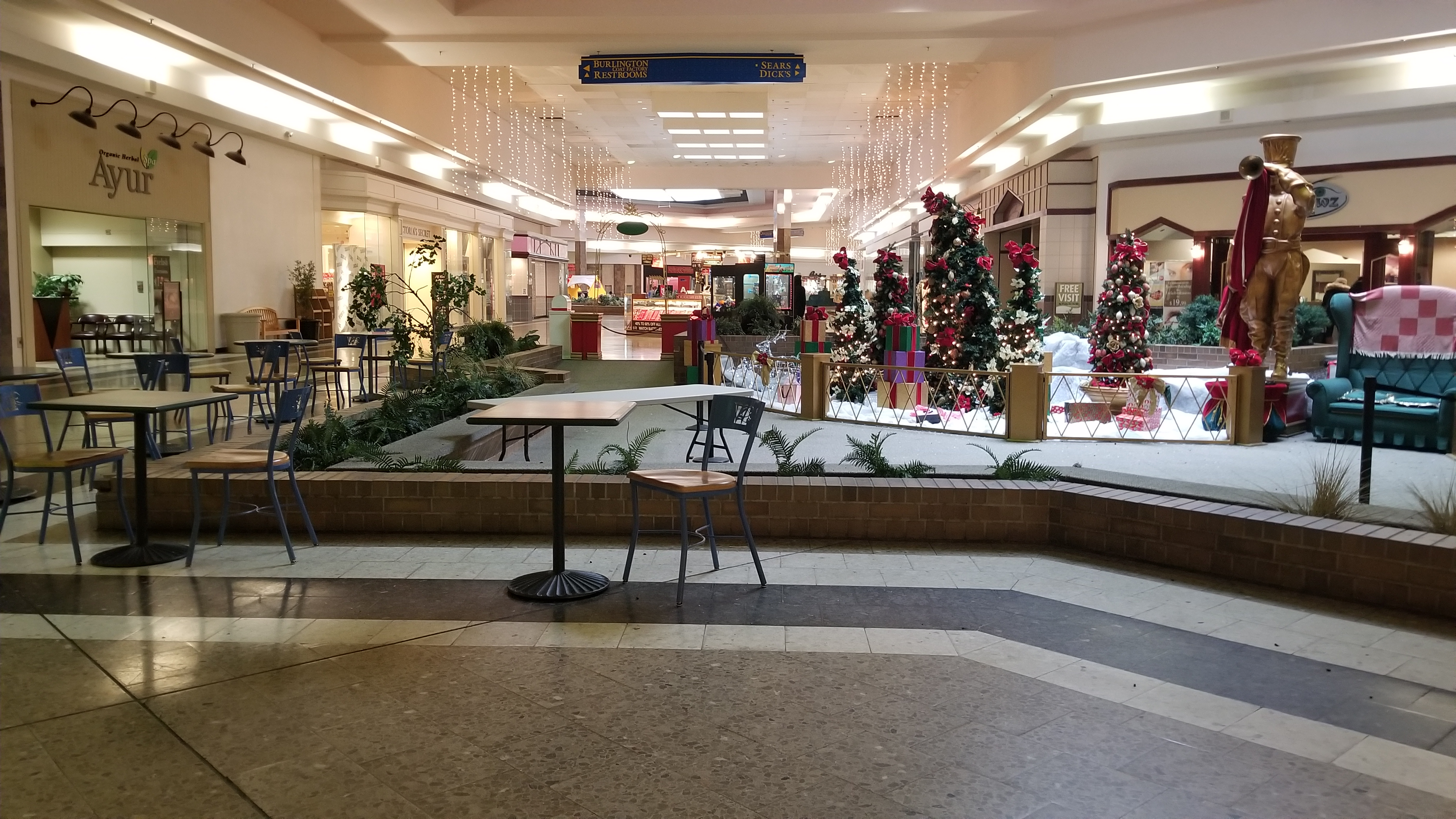
Another shot of the interior

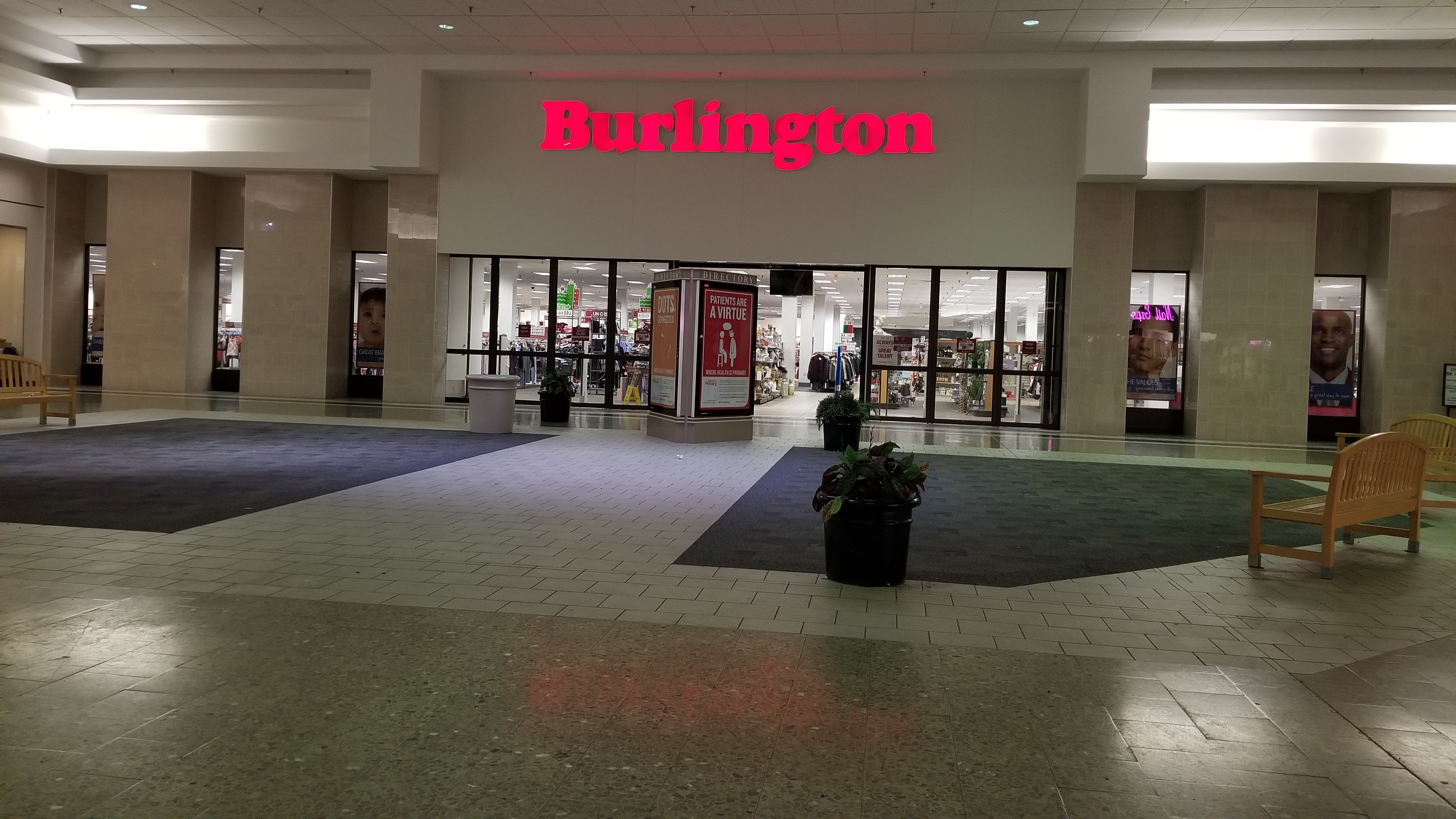
Burlington Coat Factory. Closed 2020.

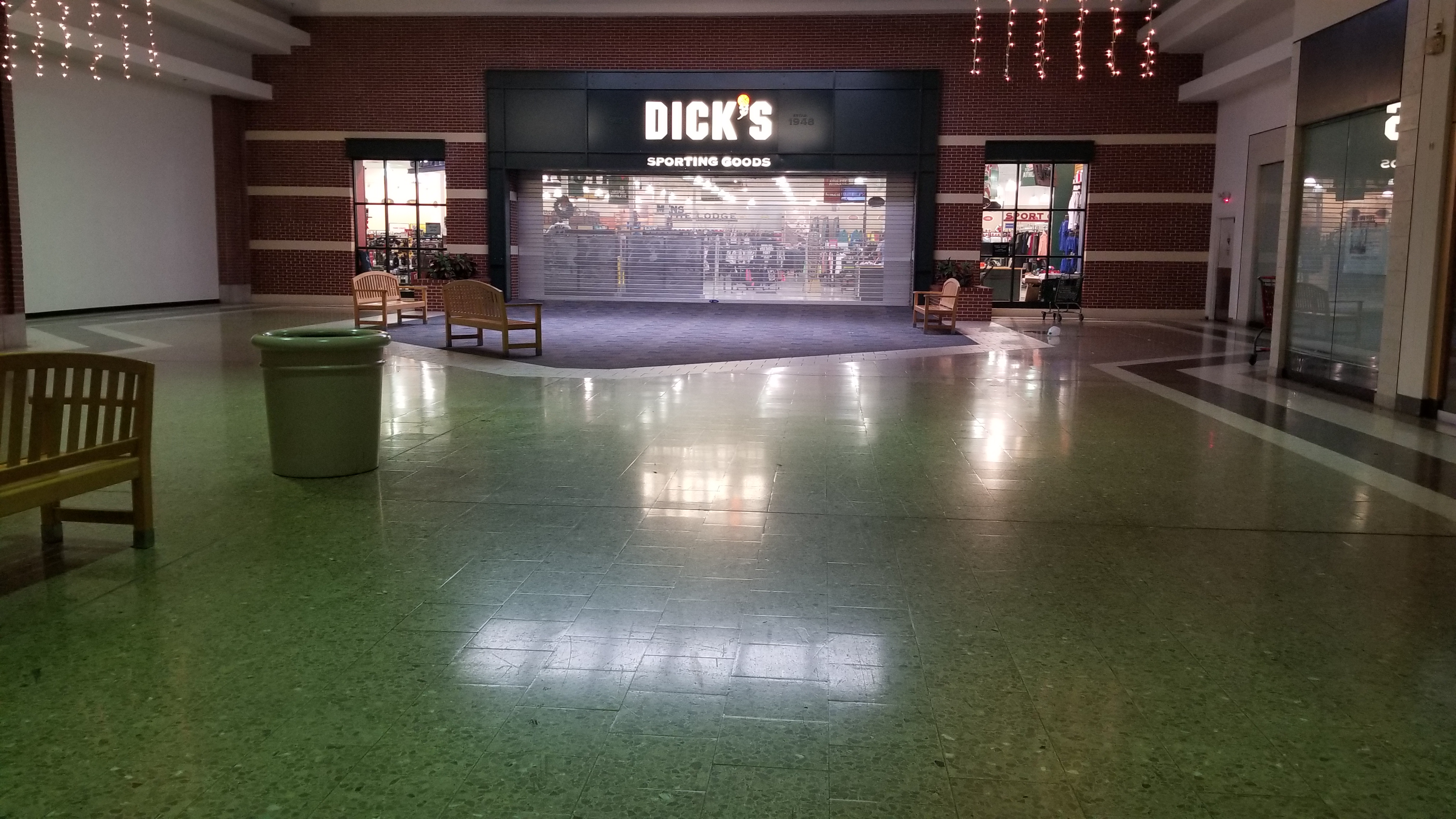
Dick's Sporting Goods. Closed 2020.

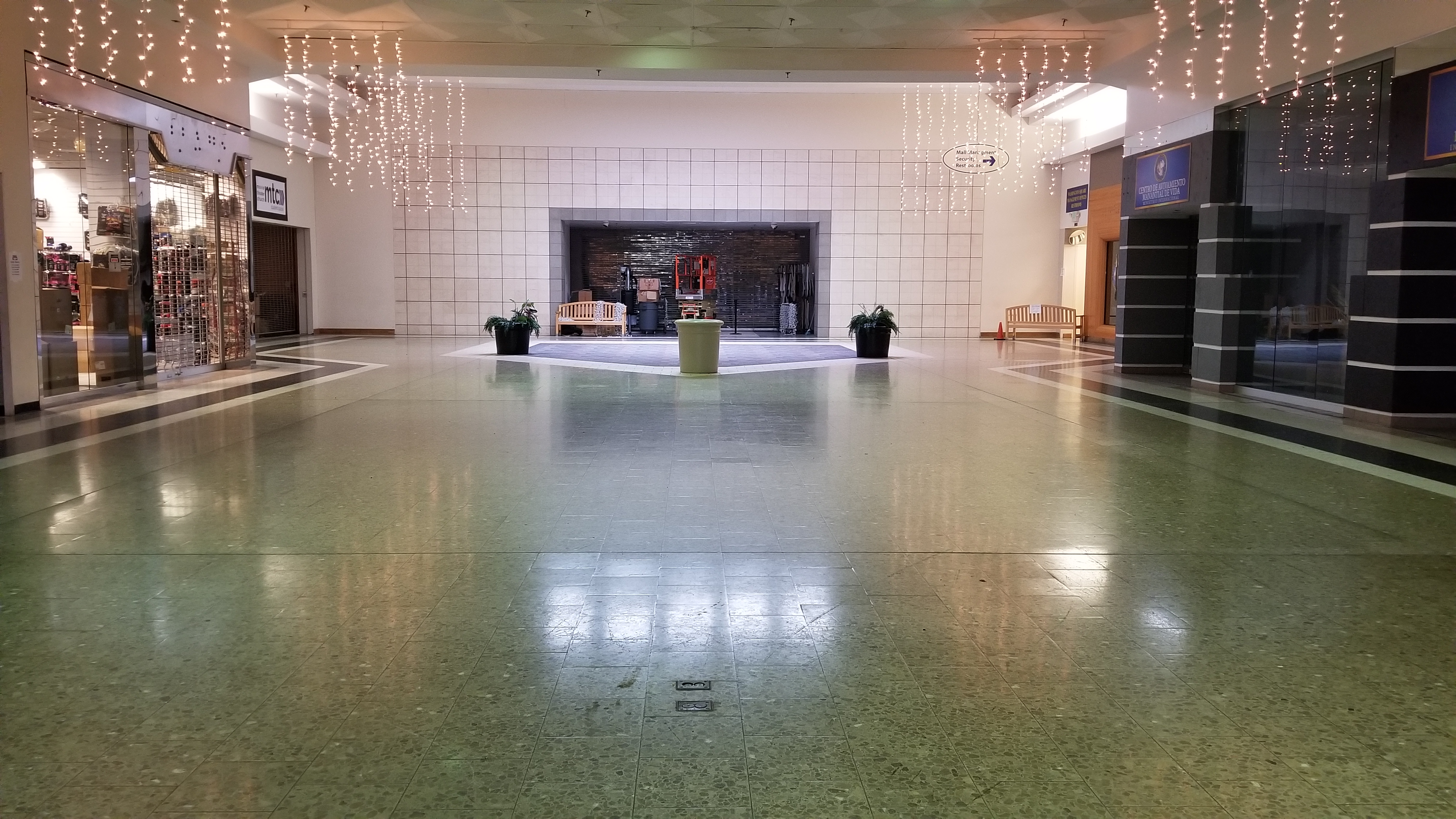
Sears. Closed 2014.

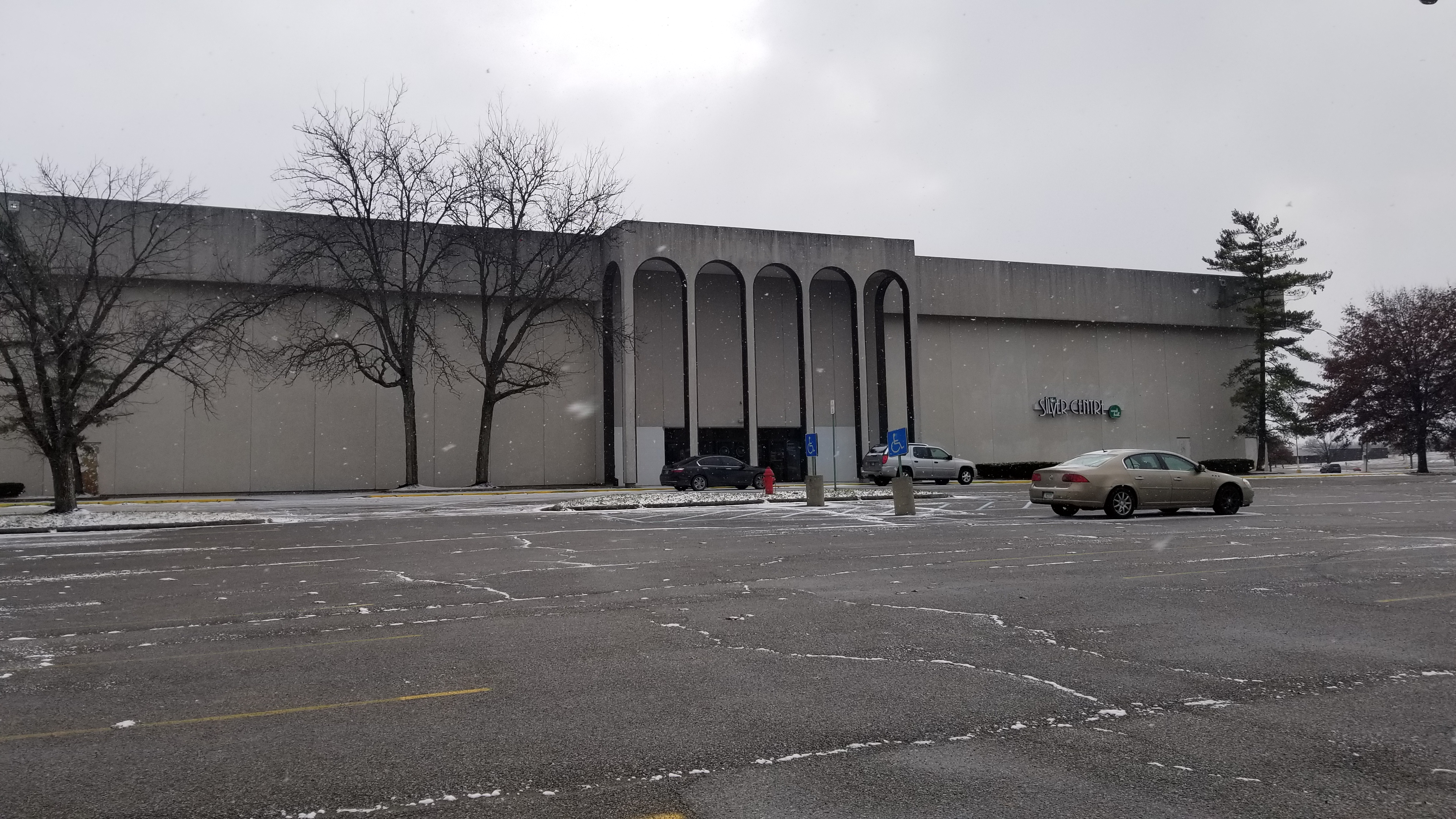
Former L. S. Ayres/Macy's store. Seen in 2018.

== See also ==
- Economy of Indianapolis
- List of attractions and events in Indianapolis
- List of shopping malls in the United States
