= First Internet Bank =

First Internet Bank of Indiana
- Company type: Public
- Traded as: Nasdaq: INBK; Russell 2000 Component
- Industry: Financial services
- Founded: 1997; 29 years ago
- Headquarters: Fishers, Indiana, U.S.
- Key people: David B. Becker (CEO)
- Products: Direct banking
- Total assets: ▲US$5.32 billion (2024)
- Number of employees: 295 (2024)
- Parent: First Internet Bancorp
- Website: www.firstib.com

First Internet Bank of Indiana (First IB) is the sole subsidiary of First Internet Bancorp, an American bank holding company headquartered in Fishers, Indiana. It was established as one of the first state-chartered banks to operate exclusively online and via telephone, without any physical branches.

Founded in 1997 by David B. Becker, the bank was incorporated on October 28, 1998, and began operations on February 22, 1999. Specializing in online retail banking and securities investment, it offers a range of financial products including interest-bearing checking accounts, savings accounts (standard and money market), certificates of deposit, individual retirement accounts, credit cards, personal lines of credit, and installment loans.

Privately capitalized with over 300 individual and corporate investors, First Internet Bank became a wholly owned subsidiary of First Internet Bancorp following a Plan of Exchange completed on March 21, 2006.

== See also ==
- Direct bank
- Online banking
- Telephone banking
