= L. Strauss & Co. =

- Type: Department store
- Industry: Retail
- Founded: 1853
- Defunct: 1993
- Fate: Bankrupt
- Headquarters: Indianapolis, Indiana
- Products: men's, women's and children's clothing, hats, footwear, jewelry, beauty products, and giftware.

L. Strauss & Co. was a distinctly upscale department store chain headquartered in Indianapolis, Indiana. The store was founded in 1853 and declared bankruptcy 140 years later in 1993. The store originally was named the Eagle Clothing Company. Eagle Clothing became one of the city's retailing leaders and reportedly pioneered in the use of fixed prices for customers. In 1879, Leopold Strauss acquired the store and later changed the name to L. Strauss and Company.

The main store for many years was located in the Occidental Building on the southeast corner of Washington and Illinois streets. In 1969, Genesco—a conglomerate based in Nashville, Tennessee, and owner of such stores as Bonwit Teller—acquired L. Strauss and hired Thad Larson as president. Seeking to return the store to local control, Larson purchased the store from Genesco in 1979. The Occidental Building was torn down in the 1980s in order to make way for Circle Centre Mall. The downtown store moved across the street to Claypool Court, atop which sits the Indianapolis Embassy Suites Downtown hotel. In the bankruptcy filing, one of the reasons listed for the bankruptcy was delays in opening of Circle Centre. The company's main competitors were L. S. Ayres, William H. Block Co., and H. P. Wasson and Company.

During the store's existence, winners of the Indianapolis 500 were presented, in addition to the Borg-Warner Trophy, the L. Strauss & Co. Trophy.
