= The Fashion Mall at Keystone =

Upscale shopping mall in Indianapolis, Indiana, US

Fashion Mall at Keystone
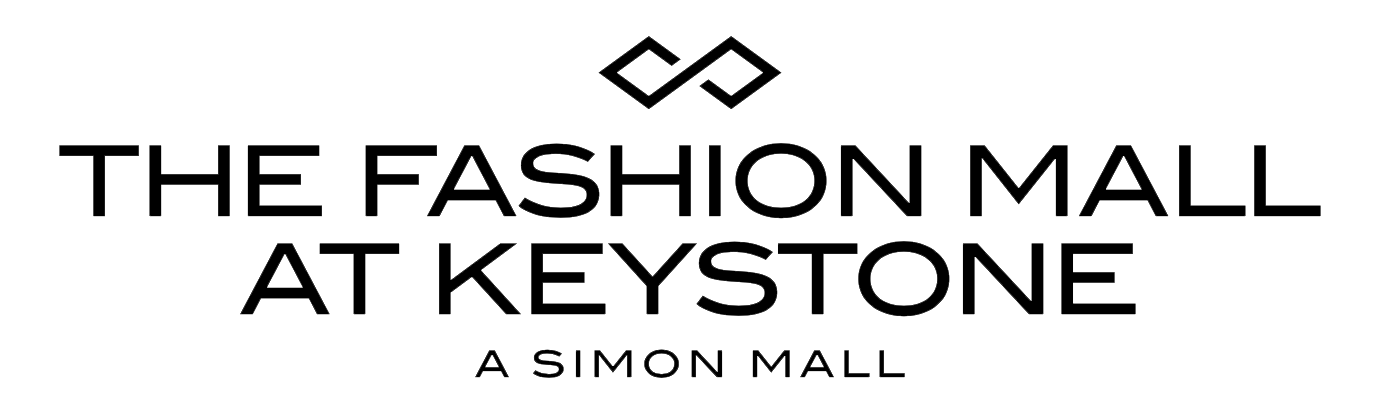
- Official logo of center.
- Location: Indianapolis, Indiana, U.S.
- Coordinates: 39°54′52″N 86°06′34″W
- Opened: 1973
- Developer: Melvin Simon & Associates
- Manager: Simon Property Group
- Owner: Simon Property Group
- Num. of stores: 123
- Num. of anchor tenants: 2 (2 open, 0 vacant)
- Floor area: 710,587 sq ft (66,015.7 m^{2})
- Floors: 2 (3 in Saks Fifth Avenue)
- Parking: surface parking, 2 parking garages
- Public transit: 26, 86
- Website: Fashion Mall at Keystone

The Fashion Mall at Keystone, known better as The Fashion Mall, is an upscale shopping center in the northeast section of Indianapolis, Indiana, United States. The mall is located off I-465 at 86th Street and Keystone Avenue. The mall is considered the heart of the Keystone at the Crossing district, including headquarters for Lucas Oil. It was developed, managed, and owned by Indianapolis-based Simon Property Group.

The mall is anchored by a Nordstrom. Saks Fifth Avenue closed in July 2024 for redevelopment. Junior anchors include Pottery Barn, The North Face, Apple Store, Urban Outfitters, and Crate & Barrel. The Fashion Mall consists of two two-story buildings. When the mall first opened, they were linked by a glass archway called "The Crossing" that also served as the mall's food court. The archway has since been converted into additional retail space. The mall offers 123 specialty shops and restaurants. Over 40% of the stores in the mall have their sole location in the state of Indiana there. About 97% of the store's retail area was in use at the end of 2006.

Sometimes the area is called Keystone/Clearwater, which refers to the large neighboring Clearwater Crossing mixed-use development named after the nearby Lake Clearwater.

Parisian's parent company, Saks Incorporated, sold the entire chain of stores to Belk. Belk thus sold the location to Nordstrom. In summer 2007, the store was renovated and reopened as the state's second Nordstrom location. The process was similar to Saks Fifth Avenue's renovation and replacement of Jacobson's old store in 2002.

== History ==
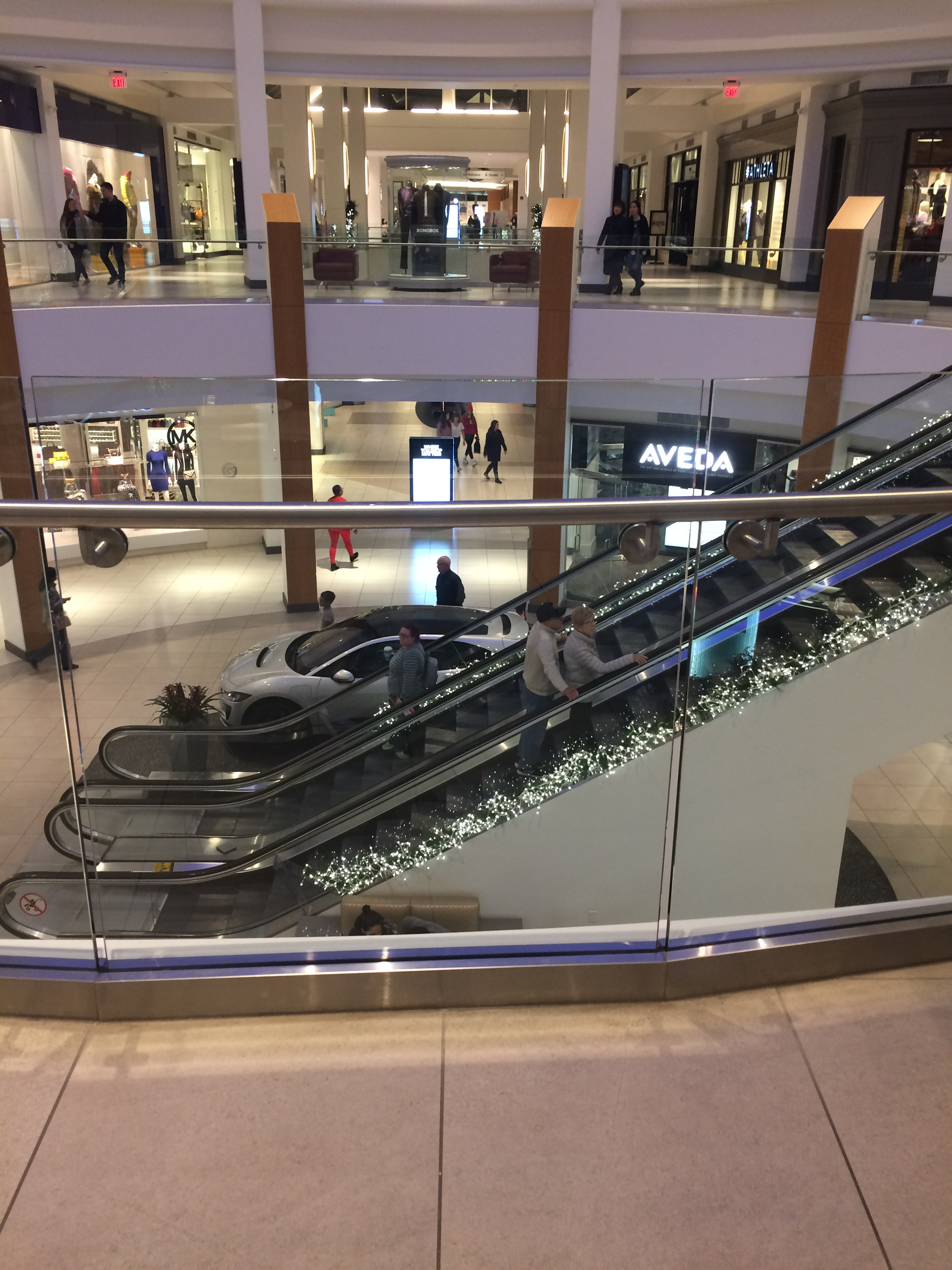
The interior of the mall.

The Fashion Mall had its original incarnation in the early 1970s as a small luxury mall of 50,000 square feet (4,600 m^{2}). The Fashion Mall was adjacent to its companion shopping center called The Bazaar, a building of labyrinthine corridors housing family-run stores. The Fashion Mall underwent several renovations and expansions over the years, and The Bazaar was eventually demolished to make way for the growing shopping center. Over the years, numerous retail centers and stand-alone restaurants have been built both in the mixed-use development where the Fashion Mall is located and all along the 86th Street corridor. The Fashion Mall/Clearwater Crossing area now provides a continuous retail corridor which merges with the Castleton Square Mall shopping area located almost 3 miles (4.8 km) to the east. The Fashion Mall has become a regional high-end shopping destination, standing two stories high and covering 680,000 square feet (63,000 m^{2}) in two separate buildings. The buildings are connected by an archway called "The Crossing" which served as the complex's food court until renovations in 2011–2012. The food court was moved to new space immediately to the west.

The Fashion Mall has had many retailers in its past. Its old anchor, Jacobson's, was the only store located in the state of Indiana. It was replaced by Saks Fifth Avenue in 2003, which was also the only store in the state. Parisian at The Fashion Mall, which is one of two stores (the other location at Circle Centre was rebranded as Carson Pirie Scott & Company) in the state, was converted to Nordstrom in fall of 2008, now the only such store in the state, following the closure of the Circle Centre Mall store in 2011.

Crate & Barrel opened in late 2005, and Tiffany & Co. opened in 2006. The mall had $586 of sales per square foot in 2005.

== See also ==
- Economy of Indianapolis
- List of attractions and events in Indianapolis
- List of shopping malls in the United States
- List of Simon Property Group properties
