= H. P. Wasson and Company =

American department store chain

H. P. Wasson & Co.
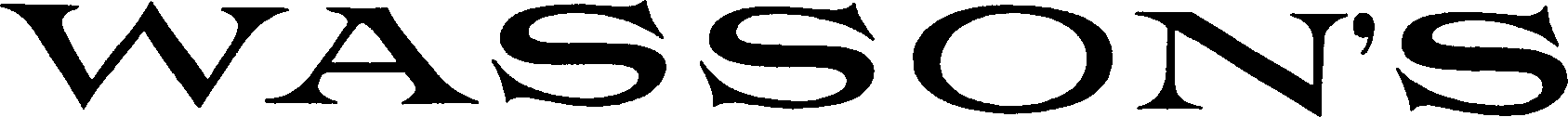
- Type: Department store
- Industry: Retail
- Founded: 1874; 152 years ago
- Founder: Hiram P. Wasson
- Defunct: 1980; 46 years ago
- Fate: Closure due to business decline as a result of change of ownership
- Headquarters: Indianapolis, Indiana
- Number of locations: 7 (at its height in 1967)
- Area served: Central Indiana
- Products: men's, women's and children's clothing, footwear, jewelry, beauty products, bedding, housewares and home furnishings.
- H. P. Wasson & Company Building
- U.S. National Register of Historic Places
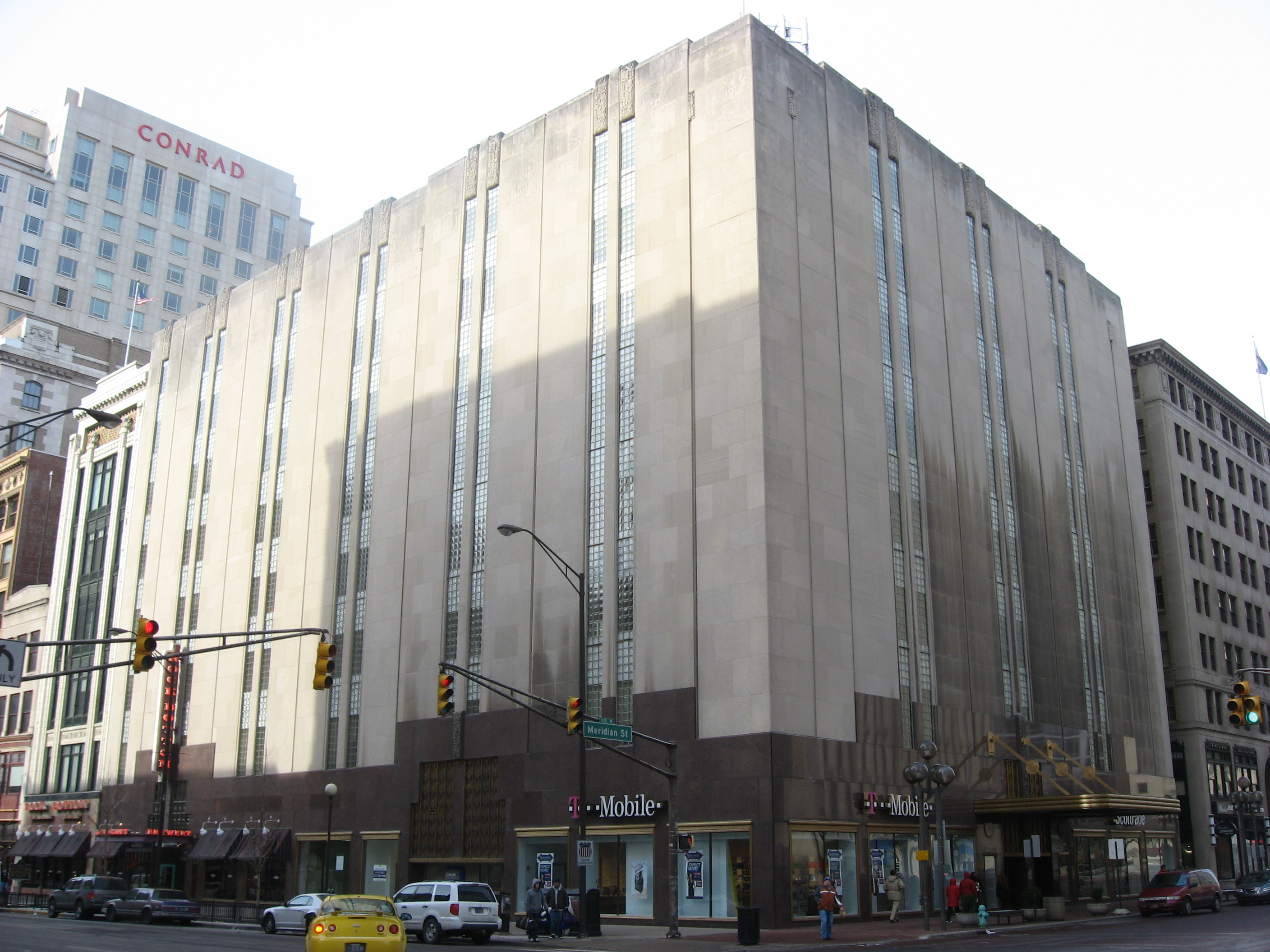

- Location within Indianapolis Location within Indianapolis Location within Indiana Location within the United States
- Location: 2 W. Washington and 2 N. Meridian Sts., Indianapolis, Indiana
- Coordinates: 39°46′2″N 86°9′30″W
- Area: less than one acre
- Built: 1937
- Architect: Rubush & Hunter; Graham, Anderson, Probst, & White
- Architectural style: Art Deco
- NRHP reference No.: 97001539
- Added to NRHP: December 24, 1997

H. P. Wasson and Company, aka Wasson's, was an Indianapolis, Indiana, based department store chain founded by Hiram P. Wasson. Its flagship store, the H. P. Wasson & Company Building, was built in 1937 and is listed on the U.S. National Register of Historic Places.

== History ==
H. P. Wasson bought the Bee Hive Drygoods Store in 1874, renaming it nine years later as H. P. Wasson and Company. With the death of H. P. Wasson in 1910, and his son Kenard Wasson in 1912, the store was sold to Gustave A. Efroymson and his brother-in-law Louis P. Wolf. The chain would eventually consist of seven stores with the flagship store located at 2 West Washington Street in downtown Indianapolis.

Efroymson was president of the company from 1912 to 1930.

In 1930, a second store was built on Monument Circle on the site of the former Morton Hotel. The entire second and parts of the third floors of the Monument Circle Annex store were destroyed in a fire on the evening of June 1, 1969.

After the Korean War, Wasson's began to build new stores in the outdoor shopping centers that were being developed in new housing developments on the outskirts of suburban Marion County during the late 1950s and early 1960s. By the early 1960s, first shopping centers and then enclosed malls were being built inside and also in nearby communities outside of Marion County. Branch stores were built in a shopping center in Kokomo and enclosed malls in Anderson and Bloomington. The open air shopping center locations at Eastgate and Kokomo were later converted into enclosed malls.

Louis C. Wolf became president in 1963 upon the retirement of his father Walter E. Wolf, who remained CEO. He was killed in a plane crash in Alaska during a hunting trip while piloting a new single-engine Cessna in August 1967 at the age of 40. Members of his family sold the company in October of the same year to Goldblatt's of Chicago. Expansion and new development of the firm died upon Louis C.'s death.

In September 1967, Richard L. Glasser was appointed president and CEO while Walter E. Wolf Sr. remained chairman of the board of directors.

There were a total of seven stores by the time Wasson's was acquired by Goldblatt's in 1967, which included three stores in Indianapolis-area shopping centers and in malls located in the cities of Kokomo, Anderson, and Bloomington. The Goldblatt's acquisition of Wasson's was not successful as the two chains did not cater to the same market segments. Wasson's catered to the middle class, while Goldblatt's was a discount department store. During Goldblatt's ownership a distinct decline in merchandise quality occurred. Moreover, Goldblatt's did not open any new outlets after the acquisition, or relocate any stores into the new regional malls that ringed the city.

After suffering large losses, Goldblatt's sold the downtown store and the other property around Monument Circle to Melvin Simon and Associates for $2.25 million (~$7.82 million in 2024) in December 1979, and started to close the Indianapolis metropolitan stores.

In September 1980, Goldblatt's announced that they planned to close the Anderson and Bloomington stores along with other Goldblatt stores in January 1981 as a cost saving measure after experiencing staggering corporate losses for the third straight year.

The Bloomington store at College Mall closed in January of the following year. The store had opened in 1965 as one of the original anchors of the mall.

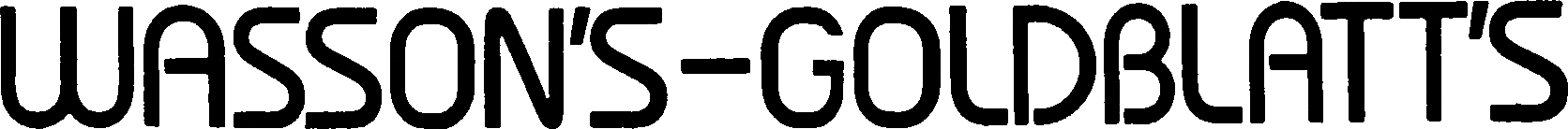
Wasson's-Goldblatt's transition logo

On February 27, 1981, Goldbatt's announced that the last Wasson's store would close in Kokomo on the next day. The Kokomo store had been one of the first stores in the Kokomo Mall when that mall had opened in 1963, and was the first store that H. P. Wasson had opened outside of Marion County.

== Building ==
The nine-story Art Moderne flagship store located at 2 West Washington Street was converted into a retail/office complex in the early 1980s. The main store was designed by the noted Indianapolis architectural firm of Rubush and Hunter and constructed by the William P. Jungclaus Company in 1937. A distinguishing feature of the Washington Street Store was the elimination of windows on the upper floors. With the advent of fluorescent lighting, windows were no longer required. The Washington Street location was added to the National Register of Historic Places in 1997. The former Wasson's annex located on Monument Circle burnt down in 1969 and was subsequently replaced by a park. In 1998, a new headquarters for Emmis Corporation was built on the site.

Wasson's Credit Union, which opened in October 1923, was the first credit union in Indiana and in the Midwest.

Competitors were L. S. Ayres, L. Strauss & Co., and William H. Block.

== See also ==
- List of Art Deco architecture in Indiana
- National Register of Historic Places listings in Center Township, Marion County, Indiana
