= Glenbrook Square =

Shopping mall in Fort Wayne, Indiana, U.S.

Coordinates: 41°6′54.8″N 85°8′17.1″W

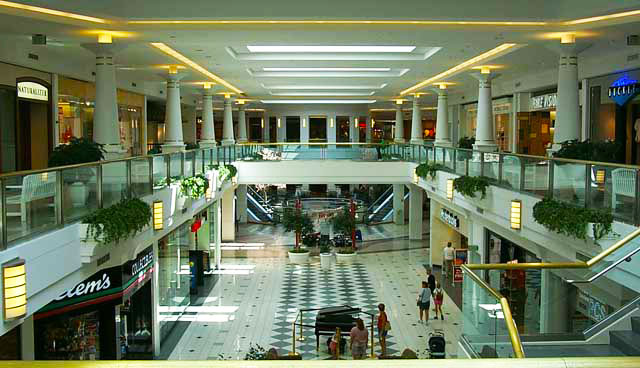
- A view of the mall, looking from the former Carson's
- Location: Fort Wayne, Indiana, USA
- Opened: 1966
- Developer: Glendale Centers Inc.
- Manager: Hull Property Group
- Num. of stores: 130
- Num. of anchor tenants: 6
- Floor area: 1,210,000 sq ft (112,000 m^{2})
- Floors: 2 (3 in Macy's)
- Public transit: Citilink
- Website: www.glenbrooksquare.com

Glenbrook Square is a shopping mall at 4201 Coldwater Road, in Fort Wayne, Indiana. The anchor stores are JCPenney, Macy's, and Barnes & Noble.

== History ==
Glendale Center Inc. built the mall in 1966 under the original name of Glenbrook Center. Original anchor stores were Sears and L. S. Ayres & Co. department store, their first location in an enclosed mall. Another major tenant was a Danners variety store, the largest in the chain at the time.

Since the mall's opening in 1966, Glenbrook has been expanded and/or renovated five times. These expansions and renovations occurred in 1976, 1981, 1990, 1994, and 1998; with the 1976, 1981, and 1998 renovations also being major expansions. Glenbrook Square annually receives over 15 million visitors, and is the only enclosed super-regional mall in northeast Indiana. Based on leasable square feet, Glenbrook Square is also one of the three largest malls in the state of Indiana along with Castleton Square in Indianapolis and Southlake Mall in Merrillville. In total, Glenbrook Square has a gross leasable area of 1,210,000 square feet (112,000 m^{2}).

Glenbrook Square features 152 stores and kiosks, three anchors, and space for two more. A food court can be found, along with casual dining restaurants P.F. Chang's, Red Robin, Granite City Food & Brewery, and BJ's Brewhouse.

A water main break occurred at Glenbrook Square on October 31, 2013, during overnight hours. 50 stores were damaged in the incident, but all five anchor stores were unaffected. Most affected stores were repaired and reopened within weeks, and all damaged stores except one reopened by Black Friday 2013.

=== Anchors ===
Glenbrook's current anchors are Macy's, JCPenney, and Barnes & Noble, with one currently unused space under redevelopment and a second lot under redevelopment. L.S. Ayres (now Macy's) is one of Glenbrook Square's original anchors, in continuous operation since the mall's opening. The building for JCPenney was added in the 1976 expansion. An A&P grocery store was also an original tenant. It closed when A&P left Fort Wayne in the 1970s, and in 2007 the Barnes & Noble store opened in that area (it was converted from several smaller stores).

Sears also opened simultaneously with the mall. It closed in 2018, and the building was demolished in summer 2019. New York-based Seritage SRC Finance LLC planned to build a new building at the location, attached to the Glenbrook Square building. Announced tenants included Dave & Buster's, HomeGoods, and Portillo's, and more were expected to be announced later, opening in 2020. However, construction was halted due to the COVID-19 pandemic. It was later announced that Dave & Buster's would not be expanding to the location.

Another anchor (now unused) was added in the 1981 expansion, which originally hosted a Hudson's (later Marshall Field's). In 2004 Marshall Field's was bought by May Co., which also owned the L.S. Ayres anchor. They closed the Marshall Field's anchor in 2005, and on December 12, 2007, the company (which by then had merged with Federated Department Stores and been renamed Macy's, Inc.) sold the vacant store back to GGP for $1 million. For a few years the space was used for temporary retailers such as Glowgolf, a fashion show sponsored by local Christian radio station WLAB Star 88.3, and a Habitat for Humanity gift-wrapping station and display of Department 56 houses that operated during several holiday seasons. Carson's anchored the space from 2013 until it closed on August 31, 2018, due their parent company, The Bon-Ton Stores, going out of business. At the same time as the store closings, Brookfield and Seritage Growth Properties put plans in place to renovate the former Carson's and Sears spaces, respectively. On August 8, 2019, Japanese firm Round One Entertainment had announced that they would be opening in the former Carson's in 2021, but plans were later scrapped.

== See also ==
- List of shopping malls in the United States
