= Lyman S. Ayres II =

American businessman (1908–1996)

Lyman Skinner Ayres II

President of L. S. Ayres and Company
- In office 1954–1962

Chairman of the Board of L. S. Ayres and Company
- In office 1962–1973

Personal details
- Born: Lyman Hoegh Ayres; July 5, 1908 Indianapolis, Indiana, US
- Died: December 28, 1996 (aged 88) Crown Hill Cemetery and Arboretum, Indianapolis, Indiana, U.S.
- Resting place: Section 11, Lot 19; 39.8166841°N 86.1739774°W
- Spouse: Isabel Ferguson Ayres (1908–1996)
- Children: 2
- Parent(s): Frederick M. Ayres Sr. (1872–1940); Alma (Hoegh) Ayres (1878–1969)
- Relatives: Lyman S. Ayres (1824–1896), grandfather
- Education: Yale University
- Occupation: Retail department store executive

Lyman Skinner Ayres II (July 5, 1908 – December 28, 1996) was president of L. S. Ayres and Company from 1954 to 1962 and its chairman of the board from 1962 to 1973. The flagship store in the Ayres family's Midwestern retail department store chain was founded by his grandfather, Lyman S. Ayres, in Indianapolis, Indiana, in 1872.

== Early life and education ==
Born on July 5, 1908, in Indianapolis, Indiana, Lyman Hoegh Ayres was the eldest child of Alma (Hoegh) and Frederick Murray Ayres Sr. Lyman's two siblings were a sister, Anne (1910), and a brother, Frederic M. Ayres Jr. (1913) Lyman II grew up in Indianapolis. At the age of twenty-one, he replaced his middle name with the initial S. Lyman II graduated cum laude from Yale University. He served as a lieutenant in the U.S. Navy in the South Pacific during World War II.

Lyman's grandfather, Lyman S. Ayres, a dry goods merchant from Oswego, New York, founded the L. S. Ayres retail department store in Indianapolis in 1872. Lyman II's father, Fred, was president of the family's department store business from 1896 until 1940.

== Marriage and family ==
On September 22, 1934, Ayres married Isabel Ferguson, the daughter of Eliza and Homer L. Ferguson. Isabel's father was president and chairman of the board of Newport News Shipbuilding and Drydock Company in Newport News, Virginia. Ayres and Isabel had two children: Elise "Cotton" Ayres, born in 1937, and a son, Lyman, who died in infancy in 1946. Isabel died on May 15, 1992, at the age of 81.

In 1940–41 Ayres and his wife participated in the design of Twin Oaks, their Colonial Revival residence in Indianapolis. They also collaborated with landscape architect Frits Loosten to design its gardens. In 1955 Josiah K. Lilly Jr., the grandson of Eli Lilly (founder of Eli Lilly and Company), and Josiah's wife, Ruth Brinkmeyer, purchased Twin Oaks and made substantial alterations to create a European-style estate home, which they used for entertaining and as a guest house. Ruth, their daughter, lived at Twin Oaks from 1988 until her death in 2009. William and Laura Weaver subsequently purchased the home and leased it to the Indiana Historical Society.

== Career ==
With the exception of his military service during World War II, Lyman II spent his entire career at L. S. Ayres and Company. In the decades between 1872, when his grandfather founded the L. S. Ayres department store in Indianapolis, and 1930, when Lyman II joined the firm after graduating from college, the company developed into one of the city's leading department stores. It was especially known for its customer service and women's fashions.

Lyman II worked in several capacities at the store before joining the company's executive team as a vice president and a member of its board of directors in 1940, following the death of his father. Ayres employees remember Lyman II as "approachable" and "unpretentious." On April 18, 1954, he was elected the president of L. S. Ayres, succeeding Theodore B. Griffith, his cousin. James A. Gloin succeeded Ayres as president of the company in 1962, ending nearly a hundred years of continuous family leadership of the retail department store. Ayres continued to serve the company as chairman of the board from 1962 until 1973, when he became its honorary chairman. Daniel F. Evans succeeded Ayres as board chairman. (Evans was also the Ayres president and CEO.)

With Lyman II at the helm, the company expanded from a single department store in Indianapolis into a diversified merchandising business by the end of the 1960s. Its operations included the L. S. Ayres and Company flagship store in Indianapolis and branches in Indiana, three subsidiary department stores (Bressmer's, Kaufman-Straus, and Wolf & Dessauer), a new chain of discount stores (Ayr-Way and Ayr-Way Discount Foods), specialty stores (Sycamore Shops and Cygnet), a high-end home furnishing shop (Murray Showrooms), and a real estate investment company (Murray Investments).

In 1972 Associated Dry Goods acquired the Ayres family's retail business. Following a series of subsequent mergers and acquisitions with Federated Department Stores and May Department Stores, Ayres stores were subsumed into Macy's Midwest (now Macy's Central). The Ayres flagship store in downtown Indianapolis closed in 1991, five years before Lyman II's death. The Ayres name had entirely disappeared from its stores by the end of 2006. Most of its store locations were rebranded as Macy's stores; some of them were later demolished. Carson Pirie Scott moved into the former Ayres flagship store location in downtown Indianapolis in 2007.

== Death and legacy ==
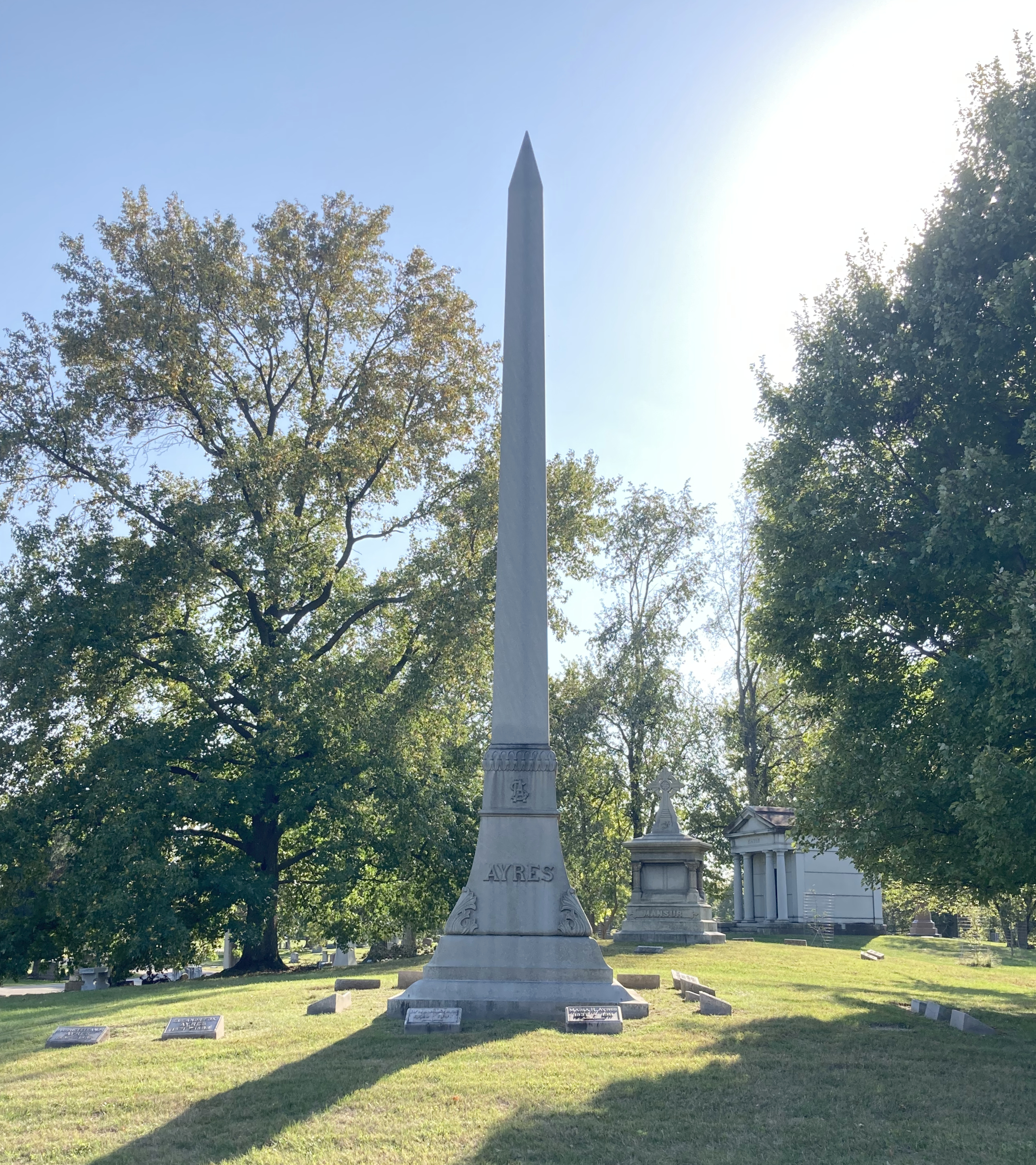
Ayres's grave at Crown Hill Cemetery

Ayres died on December 28, 1996; his remains are interred at Crown Hill Cemetery in Indianapolis. During his career at L. S. Ayres, Ayres oversaw the continued expansion of its flagship store in Indianapolis; construction of several branch stores in suburban Indianapolis, Lafayette, Indiana, and Fort Wayne, Indiana; acquisition of department stores in Louisville, Kentucky, and Springfield, Illinois; establishment of a large warehouse facility and service center in Indianapolis; the creation of Ayr-Way, one of the country's first chains of self-service discount stores; and the opening of two new specialty retail stores that catered to younger shoppers.
