= Frederic M. Ayres Sr. =

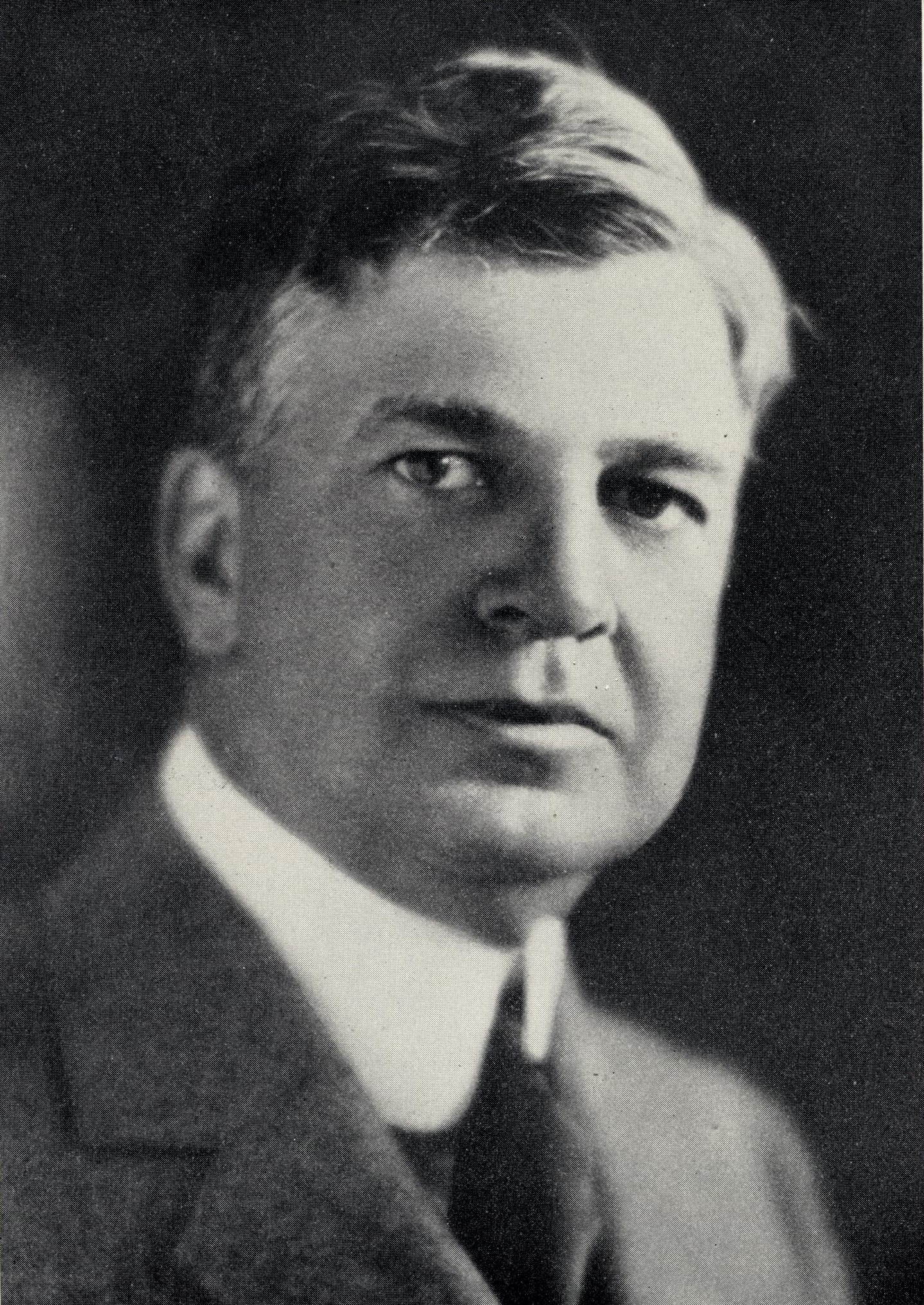
- Born: Frederic Murray Ayres; February 17, 1872; Geneva, New York
- Died: May 15, 1940 (aged 68); Crown Hill Cemetery and Arboretum, Indianapolis, Indiana, U.S.
- Resting place: Section 11, Lot 19; 39.8166841°N 86.1739774°W
- Education: Yale University
- Occupation: Retail department store executive
- Years active: 1893–1940
- Employer: L. S. Ayres
- Title: President
- Term: 1896–1940
- Spouse: Alma (Hoegh) Ayres (1878–1969)
- Children: Lyman S. Ayres II (1908–1996); Anne Ayres (1910– 2002); Frederic M. Ayres Jr. (1913–1973)
- Parent(s): Lyman S. Ayres (1824–1896); Maria Helen (Murray) Ayres (1837–1911)

Frederic Murray Ayres Sr. (February 17, 1872 – May 15, 1940) was president of L. S. Ayres and Company from 1896 to 1940. The flagship store of his family's midwestern retail department store chain was founded by Lyman S. Ayres, his father, in Indianapolis, Indiana, in 1872. During his forty-four year career at L. S. Ayres, Frederic oversaw the company's steady growth, the construction and additional expansion of its flagship store in downtown Indianapolis, and the introduction of new shopping concepts, including the store's transition to women's ready-to-wear fashions. He is best known for his quiet demeanor and service to the Indianapolis community. Ayres was a member of the Indianapolis Chamber of Commerce, among other civic groups, and a member of several Indianapolis social clubs. During World War I, Ayres served in the American Red Cross in Washington, D.C., and in France.

== Early life and education ==
Born on February 17, 1872, in Geneva, New York, Frederic "Fred" was the son of Lyman S. (1824–1896) and Maria Helen (Murray) Ayres (1837–1911). His siblings were sisters Emma Murray (1862–1945), Maria and Lyman's adopted niece, and Katherine (1880–1949). A brother, Robert, died in infancy.

Lyman S. Ayres was a dry goods merchant from Oswego, New York, who founded the L. S. Ayres retail department store in Indianapolis in 1872. Fred moved to Indianapolis with his parents when he was two years old. He attended Indianapolis public schools and the Classical School for Boys before graduating cum laude from Yale University in 1892. Ayres joined his father's retail department store business in 1893, a year after he graduated from college, and succeeded his father as president of the company in 1896.

== Marriage and family ==
Ayres married Eleanor Allen in 1898, but she died within a short time. The couple had no children.

Ayres married Alma Hoegh on May 11, 1904. Hoegh grew up in LaCrosse, Wisconsin, and graduated from Smith College in 1900. Fred and Alma Ayres had three children: Lyman, born in 1908; Anne, born in 1910; and Frederic "Fritz" Jr., born 1913. The Ayres family resided at 1204 North Delaware Street in Indianapolis. Alma was active in several Indianapolis civic groups. She served as the first president of the Indianapolis Symphony Orchestra's Women's Committee, established in 1937. Alma was also active in the city's Children's Aid Society and the Indianapolis chapters of the American Red Cross. She died in 1969 at the age of 91.

Lyman S. Ayres II, Fred's eldest son, became an Ayres vice president and board member following Fred's death in 1940. Lyman was elected company president on April 18, 1954. He retired in 1962 to become chairman of the board, a position he held until 1973, when he was named honorary chairman. Lyman II died in 1996. Frederic M. "Fritz" Ayres Jr., Fred's younger son, joined the family business in 1936. Like his older brother, Fritz worked in several capacities at the store before becoming a vice president and board member in 1940. He was the first manager of Ayres's Glendale store in Indianapolis. Fritz left the company around 1965 and moved his family to Florida, where he established a gift and home accessories store in Delray Beach, Florida. He died in 1973.

== Career ==
Lyman S. Ayres founded the L. S. Ayres department store in Indianapolis in 1872 and remained as head of the family business until his death in 1896. Lyman had been purchasing real estate along Meridian and Washington Streets in Indianapolis, where he intended to build a new store at the intersection of these two prominent downtown streets, but died before a new flagship store was built. Fred, who succeeded his father as the company's president in 1896, oversaw the new store's planning and construction. The eight-story flagship store, designed by the Indianapolis architectural firm of Vonnegut and Bohn, opened in 1905. The landmark store was enlarged several times over the years, including a North Building (1915) and a South Building (1929) during Fred's tenure as president of the company.

Fred spent his entire career working in Indianapolis at L. S. Ayres, with the exception of a brief time spent in Washington, D.C., and in France during World War I. Fred served in Washington, D.C., from February 1918 to April 1919 at the national headquarters of the American Red Cross. He served in France from May to October 1919 on behalf of the Red Cross.

By 1940, the year Fred died, L. S. Ayres had earned a reputation as one of the city's leading department stores, and was especially known for its customer service and women's fashions. Ayres and his nephew, Theodore Griffith, who succeeded Fred as president of the company, lead the store's steady growth. In addition to a modern, new building, the Ayres flagship store transitioned from women's custom-tailored to women's ready-to-wear fashions and introduced new concepts in retailing, several of which became well known in the Indianapolis community, such as the Tea Room and Economy Basement.

The Ayres Tea Room operated at the Indianapolis flagship store from 1905 to 1990. Its main purpose was to entice shoppers into the downtown store. The Tea Room was re-created at the Indiana State Museum in Indianapolis. Another new shopping concept that originated during Fred's tenure as company president was the Ayres Economy Basement, dating to the opening of the new flagship store in 1905, and later known as the Downstairs Store, Discount Shop, and Budget Store. Instead of offering cheaply made, inferior goods, as other retail department stores often did, the Ayres concept sold lower-priced goods that served as an entry point for less-affluent customers until they could afford full-priced goods on the upper floors. The budget department also served as a training ground for Ayres managers until its decline in the 1960s, when it was eclipsed by Ayr-Way, the family's discount subsidiary, as well as changes in shopping trends and pricing. (The economy department was eliminated from its stores in the mid-1980s.)

Ayres also established the groundwork for future expansion of the store. Around 1914 the family established Murray Investments, a holding company that owned the store's real estate. The subsidiary provided for future expansion with the acquisition of additional parcels of land in Anderson, Indianapolis, South Bend, and Evansville, Indiana. (Murray Investments merged with L. S. Ayres Company in the late 1960s.)

Theodore B. Griffith, Fred's nephew, succeeded Ayres as president of the company in 1940 and served in that capacity until 1954, when he became the company's board chairman. Griffith was an honorary director from 1959 until his death in 1972. Under the leadership of Griffith and other family members, the Ayres retail business expanded after Fred's death to include an eleven-story addition to the flagship store, new branches in Indiana, three subsidiary department stores (Bressmer's, Kaufman's, and W & D), a new chain of discount stores (Ayr-Way and Ayr-Way Discount Foods), specialty stores (Sycamore Shops and Cygnet), and a high-end home furnishing shop (Murray Showrooms).

In 1972 Associated Dry Goods acquired the Ayres retail operations. Following a series of subsequent mergers and acquisitions with Federated Department Stores and May Department Stores, Ayres stores were subsumed into Macy's Midwest (now Macy's Central). Most of the Ayres stores were rebranded as Macy's stores, but some of them were demolished. In 1991 the Ayres flagship store in downtown Indianapolis closed. The Ayres name disappeared from its stores by the end of 2006. Carson Pirie Scott moved into the former Ayres flagship store location in downtown Indianapolis in 2007.

== Civic interests ==
Fred was active in civic affairs as a member of the Indianapolis Chamber of Commerce, Merchants' Association and Board of Trade. He also active in the local Young Men's Christian Association and Indianapolis's Park School. Ayres was also a member of several Indianapolis social clubs, including the Columbia Club, the Indianapolis Athletic Club, and Woodstock Club, among other groups.

== Death and legacy ==
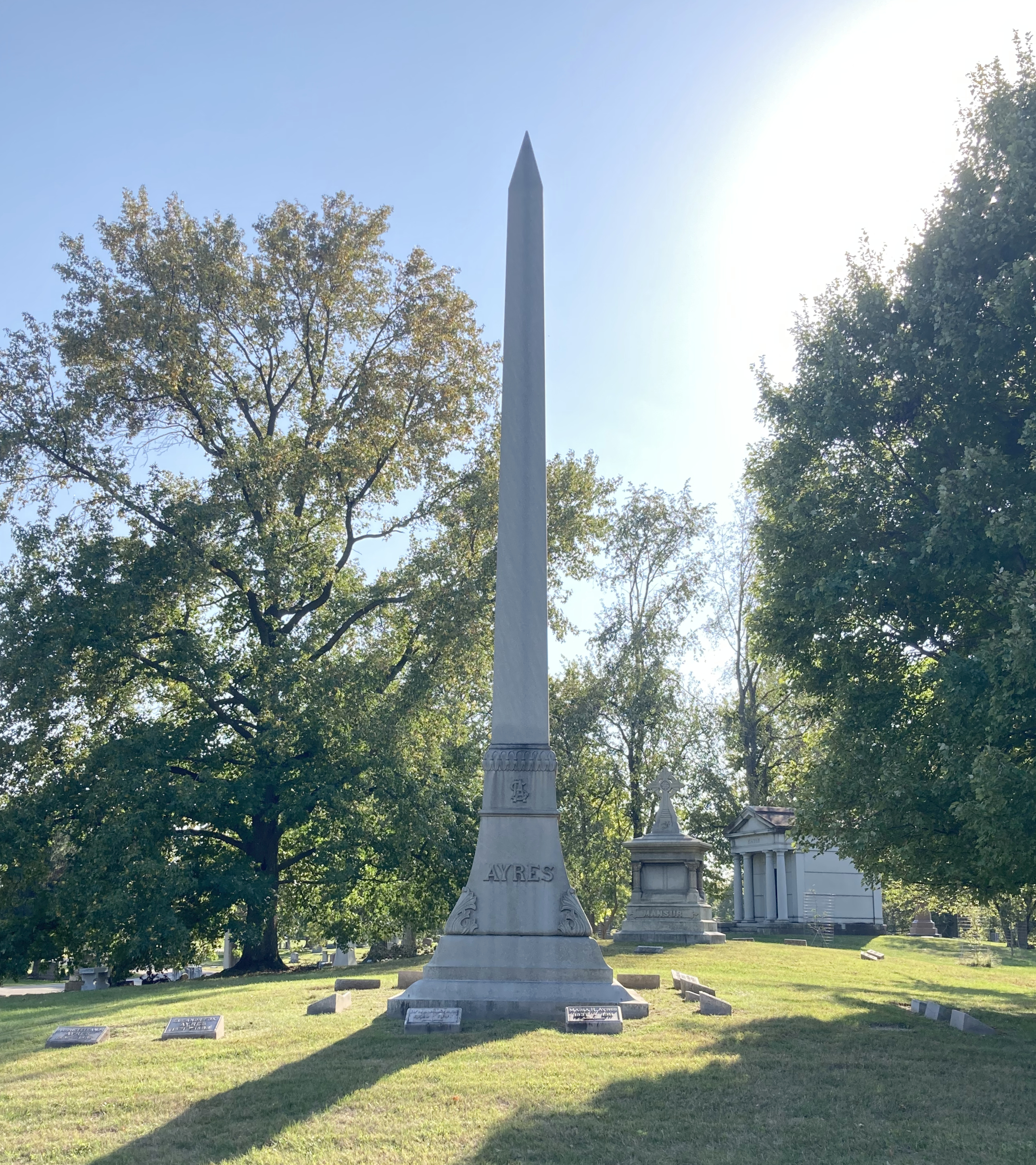
Ayres's grave at Crown Hill Cemetery

Ayres died at his home in Indianapolis on May 15, 1940; his remains are interred at Crown Hill Cemetery. During his career at L. S. Ayres, he oversaw the construction and additional expansion of its flagship store in Indianapolis, the introduction of new shopping concepts, steady growth, and the store's transition to women's ready-to-wear fashions. Ayres was known for his quiet demeanor and service to the Indianapolis community.
