= Southtown Mall =

Shopping mall in Fort Wayne, Indiana, US (1969–2003)

- Location: Fort Wayne, Indiana, U.S.
- Coordinates: 41°00′50″N 85°07′06″W
- Opened: 1969
- Closed: 2003 (demolished 2004)
- Developer: Melvin Simon & Associates
- Num. of stores: 157 (original mall)
- Num. of anchor tenants: 5 (original)
- Floor area: 927,613 sq ft (86,178.1 m^{2})(original)
- Floors: 1

Southtown Mall was an enclosed shopping mall in Fort Wayne, Indiana. Opened in 1969, it closed in 2003 due to declining traffic. Anchor stores once included JCPenney, Montgomery Ward (later Kohl's), Wolf & Dessauer (later L. S. Ayres), Sears, and Service Merchandise. The mall was demolished for new development including a Walmart and Menards.

== History ==
Southtown Mall opened in 1969, anchored by J. C. Penney, Montgomery Ward, and Wolf & Dessauer (later L. S. Ayres). Melvin Simon & Associates, the mall's developers, expanded it in 1982 with a new wing featuring Sears and Service Merchandise. Simon's then-chief executive officer, David Simon, thought that the expansion of the mall made it too big for its market. The closure of the International Harvester plant nearby in 1983 also limited the amount of possible retail growth in the area. Kohl's opened in 1983, taking the former location of Montgomery Ward. Kohl's expanded in 1995 with an experimental outlet store in a former Spiece sporting goods store.

L. S. Ayres announced closure of its store in 1991, and began to hold closing sales. Elder-Beerman was originally proposed to replace the L. S. Ayres building in the early 1990s, but the bankruptcy of that chain led to Ayres ultimately keeping its mall store open until July 1997. Service Merchandise and J. C. Penney both closed in June 1997. Other closures in this timespan included McDonald's and Casual Corner.

Having previously put the mall up for sale in 1992, Simon attempted to sell it a second time in 1998. Heywood Whichard bought it in 1999. Whichard was criticized by local developers for failing to attract new stores. Other stores that closed during Whichard's ownership included J. B. Robinson Jewelers and Old Country Buffet, while Kohl's relocated to a new store in 1999. A local developer named Billy Lewis tried to purchase the mall, and opened a convention center in the former Service Merchandise.

The mall closed on February 1, 2003, when the last of its tenants were evicted. The city of Fort Wayne acquired the building via eminent domain in 2004, and the mall was demolished that same year. Originally, the Sears and former Service Merchandise were to be left intact, but they were ultimately demolished as well due to high renovation costs. In 2006, a Menards home improvement store opened on the site. It was followed later in the year by Walmart.

== See also ==
- List of shopping malls in the United States
