= Erskine Village =

- Location: South Bend, Indiana, United States
- Coordinates: 41°37′35″N 86°13′51″W
- Address: 1240 East Ireland Road
- Opened: August 1, 1973; 53 years ago
- Closed: 2004 (Scottsdale)
- Previous names: Scottsdale Mall
- Developer: Don M. Casto Group; Joseph Skilken Corporation
- Manager: Cotswold Group
- Owner: Cotswold Group
- Architect: Sidney H. Morris
- Num. of stores: 100+ (Scottsdale); 15 (Erskine)
- Num. of anchor tenants: 3 (Scottsdale); 6 (Erskine)
- Floor area: 670,000 square feet (62,000 m^{2}) (Scottsdale); 272,000 square feet (25,300 m^{2}) (Erskine)
- Floors: 2 (Scottsdale); 1 (Erskine)
- Public transit: Transpo

Erskine Village is a shopping mall in South Bend, Indiana, United States. It opened in 2004 on the site of the former Scottsdale Mall, an enclosed shopping mall which featured L. S. Ayres, Ayr-Way (later Target), and Montgomery Ward. After experiencing a decline in tenancy throughout the late 1980s and into the 1990s, the property was torn down in 2003 and redeveloped the following year as a strip mall. Tenants of Erskine Village include Target, Ross Dress for Less, TJ Maxx, and Kohl's.

== History ==
Two Columbus, Ohio-based real estate firms, Don M. Casto Organization and Joseph Skilken Corporation, first announced plans for Scottsdale Mall in 1966. Plans were then delayed until 1969 to allow the organizations time to confirm which anchor stores would be involved. The plans called for a two-story, 860,000-square-foot (80,000 m^{2}) shopping mall to be built at the southeast corner of Miami Street and Ireland Road on the south side of South Bend, Indiana. Sidney H. Morris was the project's architect. Prior to this, Skilken and Casto had developed a strip mall called Town and Country Shopping Center in nearby Mishawaka, but had sold it to another company prior to beginning development on Scottsdale Mall.

The first three stores confirmed for the property were the three department stores which would serve as the property's anchor stores. These were Montgomery Ward, L. S. Ayres, and Ayr-Way, a discount chain operated by L. S. Ayres. At the time, Montgomery Ward did not have a department store in South Bend, instead having only a catalog store. The mall's name was derived from its proximity to a housing project called Scottsdale. Construction was delayed in mid-1970 when representatives of Casto attempted to acquire an additional 20 acres (8.1 ha) of land for additional parking. This acreage was located on land which the Indiana Department of Transportation had owned with the intent of constructing a relocation of US 20 along the south side of town. Despite the conflict in land ownership, Casto had refused proposals to alter the parking of the mall. By August, representatives of the Indiana Department of Transportation had refused Casto's proposal that the department realign the proposed route of US 20 so that it would not interfere with the mall. At the time, Casto representatives stated that they had considered withdrawing their proposal to build the mall after failing to acquire the extra land.

=== 1970s: Development and opening ===
Casto was able to alter the plans of the mall in such a way that it did not interfere with the proposed highway, and announced in July 1971 that construction would begin by year's end. By this point, the firm had confirmed a number of tenants including Spencer Gifts, Jo-Ann Fabrics, Thom McAn, Chess King, Claire's, Waldenbooks, and Lerner New York (now known as New York & Company). Representatives of Montgomery Ward and L. S. Ayres were present at a groundbreaking ceremony held on October 28, 1971, as was South Bend's then-mayor Lloyd M. Allen. Throughout 1972, Casto confirmed that the mall was being built on schedule, and that more tenants had signed leases. These included Hickory Farms, Singer Corporation, and a local tuxedo shop. Shortly before the mall opened, an article in The South Bend Tribune stated that the mall cost over $40,000,000 to build. In addition to the tenants already confirmed, the mall would also feature a community center and meeting room with a capacity of 300; fountains with seating areas; and spiral staircases and escalators connecting the property's two stories. Overall, the mall would consist of 105 stores.

Scottsdale Mall officially opened for business on August 1, 1973. Don M. Casto Jr., then-president of the Casto corporation, attended a ribbon-cutting ceremony that day. Sixteen days later, ABC Great States Theatres (last known as Plitt Theatres) opened a two-screen movie theater at the mall. The first film shown there was Jesus Christ Superstar. Ayr-Way held a grand opening event between August 27 and September 3, 1973, which offered over $1,500 in prizes and gift certificates to store patrons.

=== 1970s–1980s: After opening ===
In August 1974, employees of the mall's Farrell's Ice Cream Parlour built a 7-foot (2.1 m)-tall ice cream sundae to help raise money for the Multiple Sclerosis Foundation. The sundae provided over 6,500 mall patrons with free ice cream. Between September and October 1974, the mall hosted the American International Circus. The circus returned to the mall a year later, hosting events such as tightrope walking and juggling.

In 1981, Ayr-Way sold most of its stores to Target. The store at Scottsdale Mall was one of three in South Bend to be converted to Target that year. All of the stores acquired from Ayr-Way underwent renovations which included new décor and fixtures, as well as wider aisles. One year later, Casto invested $500,000 in renovating the mall to give it a brighter appearance than the earth tones which it featured originally. This included repainting the ceilings, adding banners to the mall balconies, erecting new light fixtures that resembled umbrellas, and planting Ficus benjamina and philodendron. In addition, land was acquired on the south side of the property with the intention of adding a fourth anchor store. Casto and Skilken sold the mall to Trivest Group of Barrington, Illinois, in 1984. This company sold it to George Comfort only a year later.

The mall had begun to experience a number of vacancies throughout the 1980s. One factor was the opening of University Park Mall in nearby Mishawaka in 1979. This mall was only 6 miles (9.7 km) from Scottsdale Mall; it was also located on a major highway near other retail developments, compared to the more residential surroundings of Scottsdale. In addition, many tenants such as The Limited, Spencer Gifts, and Redwood & Ross clothing store closed their Scottdale stores in favor of locations at University Park. A number of early tenants at Scottsdale held leases lasting either ten or fifteen years, thus creating vacancies in the early 1980s as said leases expired. One such tenant was Brown's Sporting Goods, which announced the closure of its store in 1985. Before closing sales could finish, the company managed to negotiate a new lease and opened a new store elsewhere in the mall. Owners of stores that closed in 1987 also cited factors such as increased rent and the failure of mall owners to attract a fourth anchor store. Despite these increasing vacancies, the mall's then-manager stated that a number of new tenants had opened that year such as Pearle Vision, Payless ShoeSource, and KB Toys. She also noted that many other malls had faced similar issues with tenancy due to the economy of the United States at the time, and that mall sales had increased since the previous year.

=== Late 1980s–1990s: Decline ===
By 1989, the mall had a vacancy rate of about 25 percent. In response, Sebastian Holdings of Chicago assumed management of the mall and hired consulting firms to study the property for its viability. MassMutual assumed the deed to the mall in 1991, doing so in lieu of foreclosure on a $22,000,000 mortgage by its then-owners, Scottsdale Mall Partners Limited. Representatives of MassMutual proposed renovations to the mall to include off-price and outlet stores. The May Department Stores Company, then-owners of L. S. Ayres, closed the store in January 1992 due to declining sales. Mall owners filed a suit against May Department Stores, stating that the vacant store could potentially damage the viability of the mall, and that L. S. Ayres was in violation of its lease terms by closing before the lease had expired. The company was required to reopen the store until its lease expired, or sell it to another retailer, and it was reopened in July 1992. Mall ownership changed again between 1992 and 1993, going first to Dial Properties of Omaha, Nebraska, and then to Richard I. Rubin of Philadelphia, Pennsylvania, by year's end.

By early 1993, the mall was only 54 percent occupied. Renovation plans held by Rubin that year included the addition of skylights and new elevators, as well as a food court and comedy club. In addition, the mall's theater was expanded to six screens. By the time these renovations were finished, the mall had increased to over 70 percent occupancy. The company also sought a second time to develop a fourth anchor store on the mall's south side. General Growth Properties also assumed management duties at this point and hired another new mall manager. Under their management, a number of new stores opened including Applebee's, Bath & Body Works, and MCL Cafeterias. These stores helped increase mall occupancy to over 80 percent. Despite these additions, sales remained low at the L. S. Ayres store, which closed again in late 1999 upon expiration of its lease. Following the closure of L. S. Ayres, a number of smaller stores closed within the mall. As a result, MassMutual put the mall up for sale in July 2000. Montgomery Ward closed by year's end, thus meaning the mall had two vacated anchor stores. In March 2001, a retail analyst hired by MassMutual noted that a number of malls across the country had suffered from declining tenancy due to a closure of anchor stores, and had proposed subdividing the former Montgomery Ward and L. S. Ayres spaces into big box stores such as Stein Mart or Old Navy.

Tenancy continued to decline throughout 2001, and by the end of the year, MassMutual had yet to find a buyer. National Properties of Los Angeles had turned down the property due to its price, and Schottenstein Realty of Columbus, Ohio (who at the time owned the Value City department store chain) had also declined to purchase the property for undisclosed reasons. By March 2002, local real estate developer Donald Cressy had expressed interest in buying the mall. By September 2002, the mall was purchased by a partnership of two developers: Kite Realty of Indianapolis and Kimco Realty of Jericho, New York. Kimco Realty had previously purchased the former Montgomery Ward building after that chain filed for bankruptcy. This was possible due to Montgomery Ward owning its building at the mall, as opposed to the standard practice at the time of anchor stores leasing their properties from the mall owner. The sale to Kimco and Kite was completed in July 2003, by which point Schottenstein Realty had once again joined as a partner in the redevelopment. The three companies then proposed the first step of renovation, which would involve demolishing the former Montgomery Ward for a relocation of Target; the rest of the mall would then stay open until 2004. Under these plans, the redeveloped property would become a power center named Erskine Village.

By the end of 2003, Scottsdale Mall had approximately 40 tenants left including the theater, comedy club, and a number of local stores. Demolition and closure of last remaining tenants progressed throughout 2004, continuing with the former Target store. Only a small portion of the interior mall remained open for the six stores still in operation at the time. These were a Mexican restaurant, a hair salon, a nail salon, GNC, GameStop, and RadioShack.

== 2004–present: Erskine Village ==
Tenants confirmed for Erskine Village by 2005 included Kohl's, PetSmart, and DSW. The property was completed by the end of 2005. Old Navy, Bed Bath & Beyond, TJ Maxx, and Justice all opened by 2006. Circuit City followed in January 2007. This was a smaller format store and was branded by the chain as "The City". It closed in 2009 when Circuit City filed for bankruptcy.

In 2013, Ross Dress for Less opened in the former location of Circuit City, which had also been occupied by a party supply store called Lilly's in between. This was one of two Ross Dress for Less stores to open in the South Bend area that year, the other being in Mishawaka. Bed Bath & Beyond closed in 2015. A year later, the property was put up for auction. In 2019, Schottenstein Property Group put the property up for another auction after defaulting on a loan. The property was auctioned for $23,000,000 at a sheriff's sale and sold to Cotswold Group, a real estate company from New York. As of 2022, Erskine Village features Kohl's, Target, and TJ Maxx as its major stores.

== See also ==
- List of shopping malls in the United States
