= L.S. Ayres Annex Warehouse =

- U.S. National Register of Historic Places
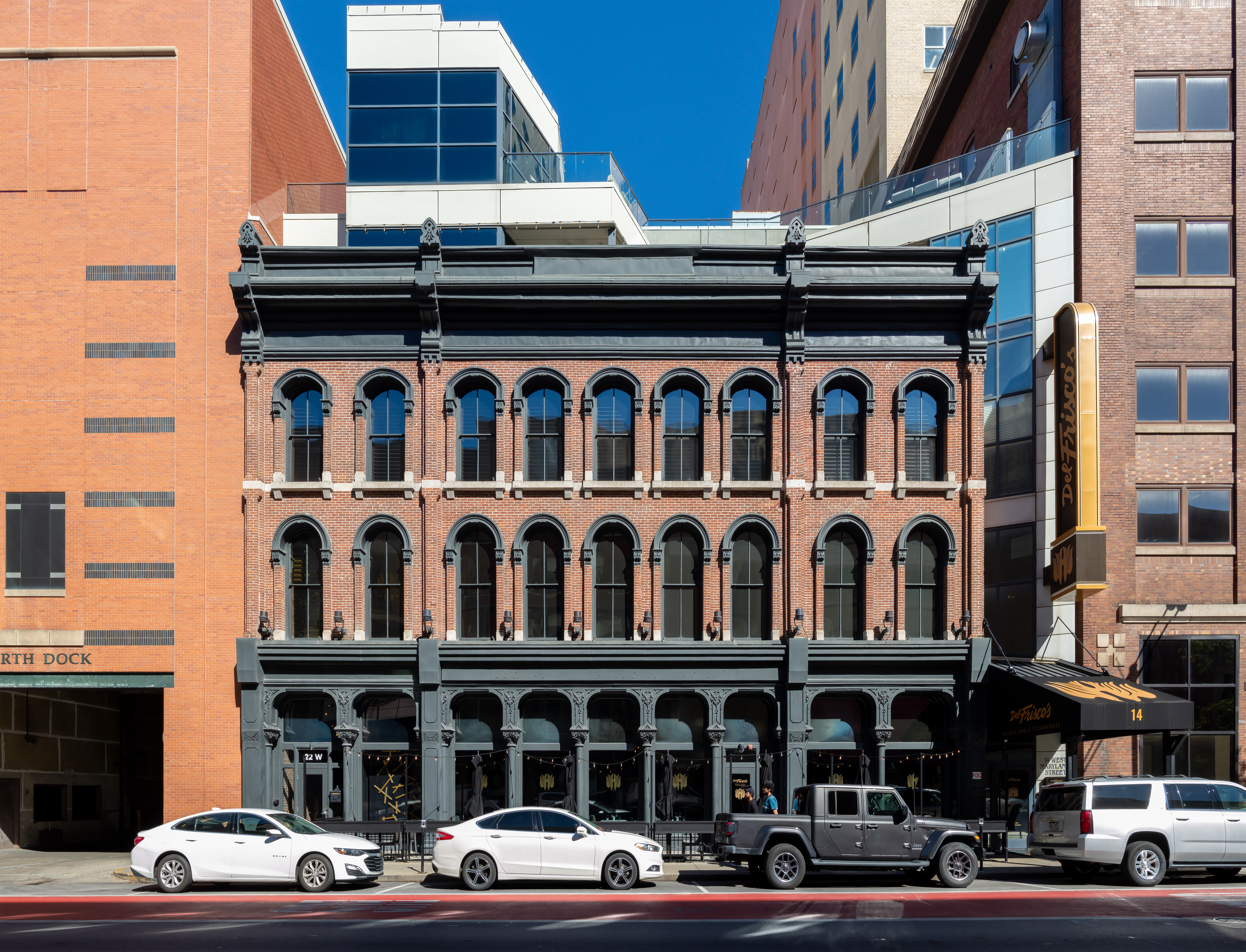
- Building as it appeared in October 2024

- Location within Indianapolis Location within Indianapolis Location within Indiana Location within the United States
- Location: Maryland St., Indianapolis, Indiana
- Coordinates: 39°45′57″N 86°9′30″W
- Area: 0.1 acres (0.040 ha)
- Built: 1875
- Architectural style: Italianate
- NRHP reference No.: 73000033
- Added to NRHP: April 23, 1973

L.S. Ayres Annex Warehouse, also known as Elliott's Block Nos. 14-22, is a historic warehouse building located at Indianapolis, Indiana. It was built in 1875 by the L.S. Ayres department store, and is a three-story, rectangular Italianate style brick building with an elaborate cast iron first story storefront. Other decorative elements are in stone, brick, and sheet metal. It measures 72 feet, 6 inches, wide and 49 feet, 6 inches, deep. It features Corinthian order columns as part of the cast iron facade.

It was listed on the National Register of Historic Places in 1973.

== See also ==
- National Register of Historic Places listings in Center Township, Marion County, Indiana
