= Ball Stores =

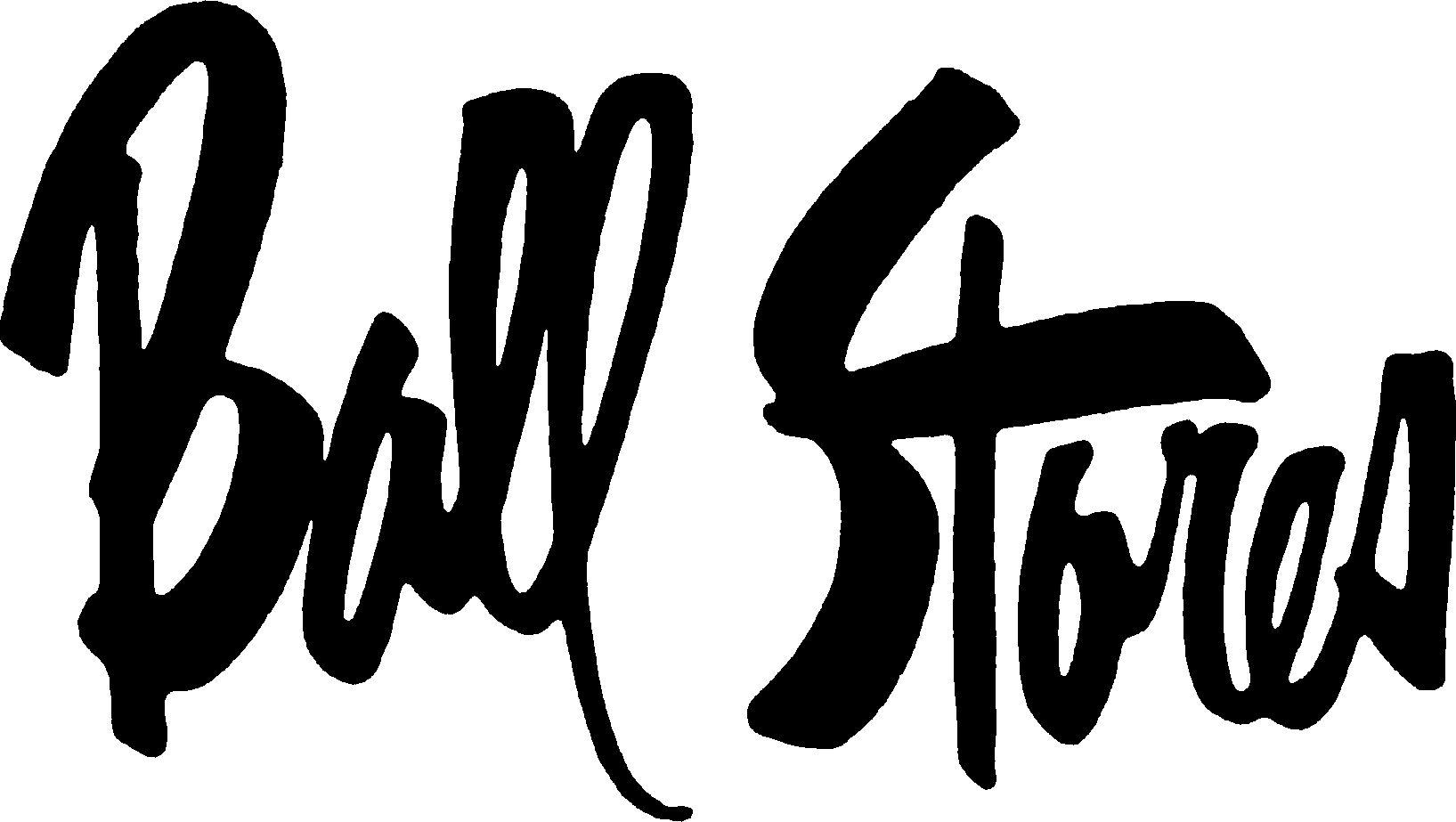
- Type: Department store
- Industry: Retail
- Founded: 1934
- Headquarters: Muncie, Indiana
- Products: Men's, Women's and Children's clothing, footwear, jewelry, beauty products, bedding, housewares and home furnishings.
- Website: None

Ball Stores was a Muncie, Indiana based department store chain founded in November 1934. The original downtown store was located in the former W.A. McNaughton Company Building (predecessor of Ball Stores) at the corner of Charles and Walnut Street. The store operated as an independent department store specializing in high quality merchandise.

In 1968, Ball Stores acquired Collegienne Shops, a retail outlet on University Avenue near Ball State University. In 1978, Ball Stores opened an outlet in Muncie Mall. By the 1980s, the company started to experience financial difficulties. In 1986, the downtown store closed, in 1988, the Collegiene was closed and in 1990, the Muncie Mall store was closed.
