= Muncie Mall =

Shopping mall in Muncie, Indiana

Coordinates: 40.2223°N 85.3753°W

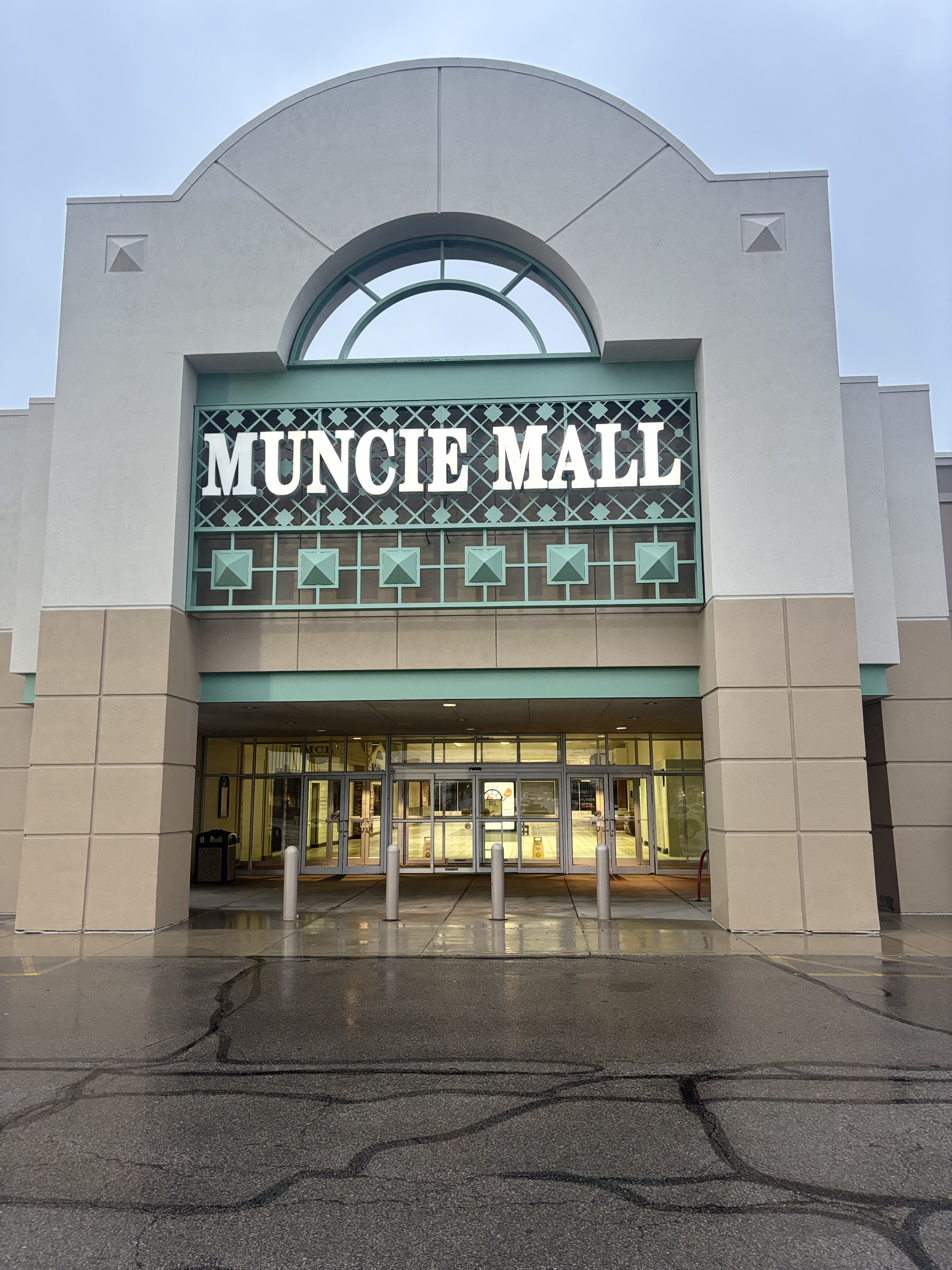
- The entrance of the Muncie Mall
- Address: 3501 N. Granville Ave.
- Opened: 1970
- Closed: 2026 (projected)
- Developer: Melvin Simon & Associates
- Owner: Hull Property Group
- Num. of stores: 30+
- Num. of anchor tenants: 4 (1 open, 3 vacant)
- Floor area: 636,000 square feet
- Floors: 1 (2 in former Carson’s)
- Parking: Parking lot with 3,000 free spaces
- Public transit: MITS
- Website: https://www.munciemall.com/

Muncie Mall is a shopping mall located in Muncie, Indiana, United States. Located along McGalliard Road on the city's northwest side, the mall opened in 1970 and was developed by Melvin Simon & Associates (Note: now known as Simon Property Group.) as one of the first enclosed regional shopping centers in east-central Indiana.

Originally anchored by Britt's, W. T. Grant, Sears, and Ball Stores, the mall became one of Muncie's primary retail and social destinations during the 1970s and 1980s. Several original anchors were later replaced following retailer bankruptcies, mergers, and closures, including the conversion of Britt's into L. S. Ayres and the replacement of W. T. Grant by JCPenney. Additional anchor and tenant changes occurred throughout the 1980s and 1990s. The property also underwent multiple interior renovations intended to modernize the aging facility and retain occupancy.

Beginning in the early 2000s, Muncie Mall experienced declining tenancy and reduced customer traffic as competition increased from power centers, big-box retailers, and online shopping. After the departure of its last traditional department store anchors and following years of extreme vacancy, the property was sold to Hull Property Group in 2024. The new owners initially planned to partially demolish portions of the mall to create outward-facing retail spaces but later announced full demolition of the enclosed structure. Demolition is expected to begin in 2026.

== History ==
=== 1964–1970: Planning and construction ===
Melvin Simon & Associates (later Simon Property Group) first sought zoning approval in 1964 for a 56-acre tract at the corner of McGalliard Road and Granville Avenue on Muncie's northwest side. Early plans for the development were more ambitious than the eventual shopping mall, calling for a mixed-use complex that would include retail space, a four-story office and medical building, and three high-rise apartment towers. The proposal became the subject of a lengthy zoning dispute and underwent several revisions over the following years. Delays associated with the approval process led to speculation that the project had been abandoned before plans for the shopping center ultimately moved forward later in the decade.

As planning for the project continued, local civic and business leaders visited several recently constructed shopping centers, including Lincoln Square Mall in Urbana, Illinois, to study enclosed mall development and its potential impact on Muncie. By 1969, Melvin Simon & Associates had finalized plans for Muncie Mall as a 550,000-square-foot (51,000 m^{2}) enclosed shopping center with space for 45 retail stores and service businesses. Plans also called for over 3,200 parking spaces.

Sears, W. T. Grant, Britt's, were announced as the mall's original department store anchors. Sears' store was planned as a 129,000-square-foot (12,000 m^{2}), 50-department location. Other tenants confirmed during the planning stages included Standard Supermarket, Osco Drug, Steck's, Singer's, Paul Harris, Jonathans, Zales, National Shirt Shops, and Kinney Shoes.

That same year, a formal groundbreaking ceremony for the multimillion-dollar development was held on May 23, 1969. Construction proceeded throughout 1969 and 1970 as additional tenants signed leases. Muncie Mall opened in stages in 1970, with Sears opening first on August 5, followed by the other anchors in the fall.

=== Stores ===
Muncie Mall opened in 1970 with Britt's, W. T. Grant, and Sears as its anchor stores. Other major tenants upon opening included a National Tea supermarket and Osco Drug. Britt's later became L. S. Ayres and Grants later became J. C. Penney, respectively. Another major tenant was Ball Stores, which later became Elder-Beerman.

Outback Steakhouse opened in the surrounding area on July 22, 1997. That year, after L.S. Ayres vacated the central anchor spot for a new store in the mall, the former Ayres building became a new Elder-Beerman store. Elder-Beerman continued to operate a home goods store within the former Ball Stores. L.S. Ayres' newer store became Macy's in 2006. Books-A-Million opened its fourth Indiana store at the mall in the former Osco Drug in 2006. Old Navy, which replaced the Elder-Beerman home store, closed in 2010.

The discount movie theater closed in the early 2000s, it has since been walled over and used for storage.

A Target store opened outside the mall on the west side on March 5, 2003.

Elder-Beerman became Carson's in 2011. On April 18, 2018, Carson's announced that its store would be closing as a result of liquidation of their parent company, Bon-Ton. The store closed on August 31, 2018. On May 31, 2018, Sears announced that they would also be closing as part of a plan to close 72 stores nationwide. Sears closed in September 2018. On May 31, 2019, it was announced that the owner of the mall will be returning the mall to the bank. On January 7, 2020, Macy's announced that they would be closing as part of a plan to close 125 stores nationwide. The store was set to close in April 2020, but due to the COVID-19 pandemic, it closed in March along with the temporary closure of the mall.

In 2019, the former Carson's was used for a once a month flea market, which later closed. In 2021, Spirit Halloween occupied the space. Neither of them used the second floor.

On June 4, 2020, JCPenney announced that it would be closing in October 2020 as part of a plan to close 154 stores nationwide; this left the mall without any anchor stores. The mall had seventeen permanently closed stores and restaurants as of July 2020.

On June 18, 2021, Buyers Market (a discount store) bought and opened in the former Macy's, only using about 50% of the sales floor.

The main plaza of the Muncie Mall as of November, 2026.

In 2022, Spirit Halloween occupied the former Carson's, and they have been the only tenant in the space since they last used it in 2021. They did not use the mall entrance. In 2022, Buyers Market Leased out the former JCPenney for storage. Although, some For Lease signs are still on the building.

In 2023, Spirit Halloween occupied the former Carson's for the third year in a row. They did not use the mall entrance.

In February 2026 it was announced that the remaining portions of the mall would close and the property would be totally demolished. In July 2026, the South portion of the mall was taped off from the public.

=== Ownership ===
Muncie Mall was owned and operated by Simon Property Group prior to being spun off, along with some other Simon-owned properties, into newly formed Washington Prime Group (WPG) in 2014. In 2020, WPG CEO Louis G. Conforti referred to Muncie Mall as one of the company's "crappiest assets". WPG CFO Mark E. Yale announced the company's intention to default on mortgage loans secured by seventeen of the company's malls, including Muncie Mall, thus transitioning these malls to the company's lenders. The mall served as collateral for a $33.1 million loan from JPMBB Commercial Mortgage Securities Trust to WPG. The mall was closed temporarily at the start of the coronavirus outbreak. A receiver was appointed to manage and lease the mall on April 14, and the mall reopened under new management by the Woodmont Company on May 18.

In January 2024, Woodmont Company sold the mall to Hull Property Group

== See also ==
- List of shopping malls in the United States
