= University Park Mall =

Shopping mall in Mishawaka, Indiana, United States

Coordinates: 41.719493°N 86.18945°W

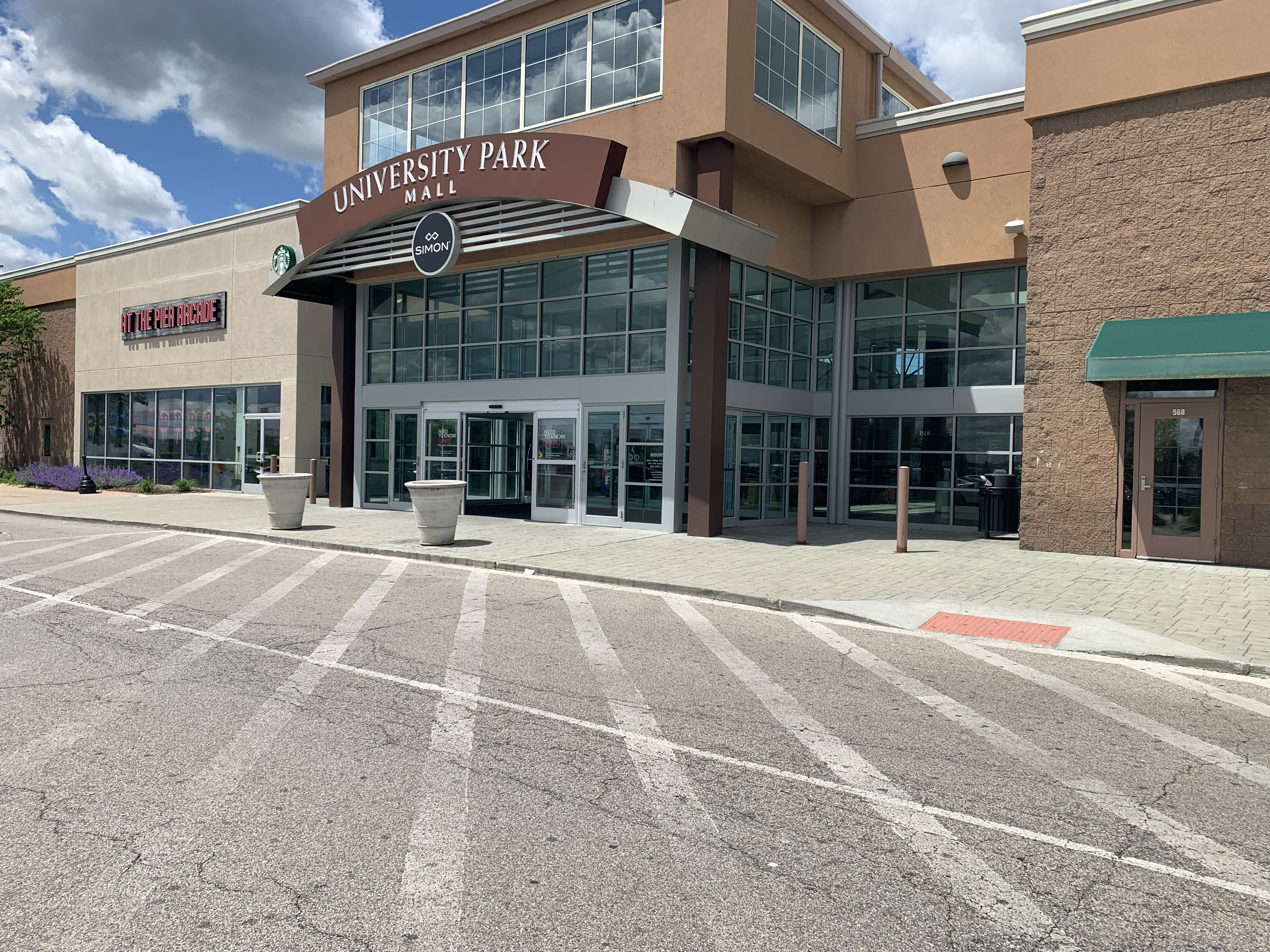
- Southeast entrance (May 2024)
- Location: Mishawaka, Indiana, U.S.
- Address: 6501 Grape Road
- Opened: March 14, 1979; 47 years ago
- Developer: Edward J. DeBartolo Corporation, George and Donald Cressy
- Manager: Simon Property Group
- Owner: Simon Property Group
- Num. of stores: 137
- Num. of anchor tenants: 4 (3 open, 1 vacant)
- Floor area: 918,559 square feet (85,336.9 square meters)
- Floors: 1 (2 in JCPenney, Macy's, and former Sears)
- Parking: 4,300+
- Public transit: Transpo
- Website: www.simon.com/mall/university-park-mall

University Park Mall is a shopping mall in Mishawaka, Indiana, United States. It serves the South Bend and Michiana areas. Opened in 1979, the mall currently features Barnes & Noble, JCPenney, and Macy's as its anchor stores, with one vacant anchor previously occupied by Sears. The mall was built by the Edward J. DeBartolo Corporation along with George and Donald Cressy. It opened with JCPenney, Sears, L. S. Ayres, and Hudson's, the last of which converted to Marshall Field's in 1997. Marshall Field's was closed in 2006 and demolished for an outdoor concourse featuring Barnes & Noble, while L. S. Ayres was converted to Macy's the same year and Sears closed in 2019. The mall has undergone a number of renovations in its history, including the addition of a food court in 1995 and removal of a movie theater in 2000. University Park Mall features over 100 stores within over 900,000 square feet (84,000 m^{2}) of mall space. It is owned and managed by Simon Property Group.

== History ==
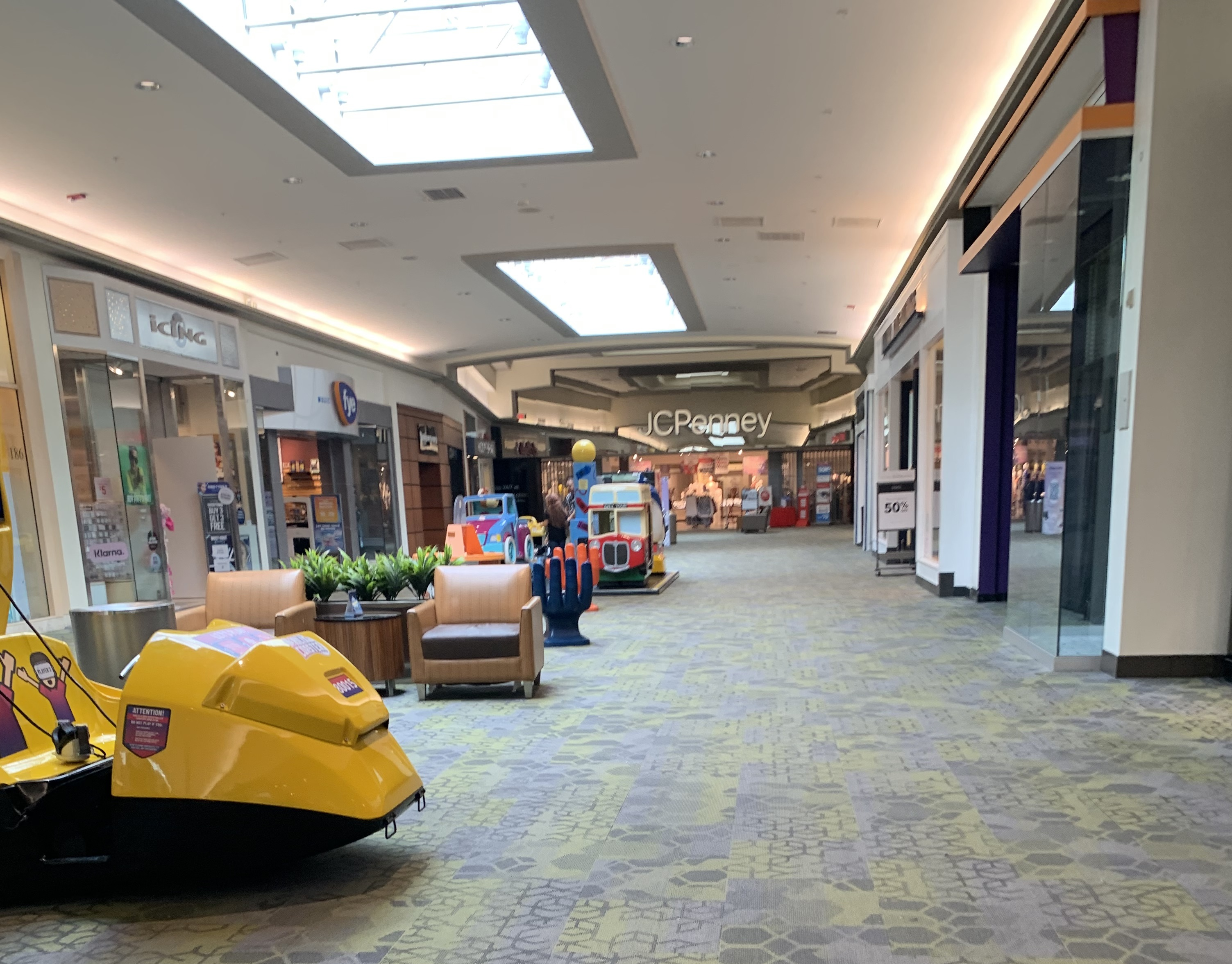
The mall's JCPenney wing

Edward J. DeBartolo Corporation first announced plans for University Park Mall in 1976. The company, working in a joint venture with local developers George and Donald Cressy, proposed a one-level complex located along Indiana State Road 23 (SR 23) and Grape Road in the city of Mishawaka, Indiana. Research conducted by the DeBartolo corporation determined the site to be suitable for a mall, given its proximity to residents with high levels of disposable income, as well as its proximity to the University of Notre Dame in nearby South Bend. Construction was slated to begin by May 1976, with plans calling for four anchor stores, with estimated building costs of $35,000,000. In mid-1976, Sears announced plans to close its department store in downtown South Bend in favor of moving to the mall. Sears's decision to close the downtown South Bend store was met with concerns from local citizens, many of whom thought the closure would draw business away from downtown South Bend. In response, many neighborhood groups and local unions sent letters to Sears in an attempt to prevent them from opening a store at the mall. Despite the local protests, Sears executives confirmed by November 1976 their decision to move to the mall. DeBartolo confirmed the mall would consist of 964,051 square feet (89,563.3 m^{2}) of retail space with a targeted opening date of 1978. Margaret Prickett, then-mayor of Mishawaka, thought construction of the mall would help improve the town's economy and increase the likelihood of the city receiving a direct exit off the Indiana Toll Road.

By the beginning of 1977, DeBartolo had confirmed L. S. Ayres as the second anchor store. It would be their second location in the South Bend area after the former Scottsdale Mall (now Erskine Village). DeBartolo was undergoing negotiations with JCPenney, Carson Pirie Scott, and William H. Block Co. as possible tenants. JCPenney was confirmed by mid-year as the third anchor store. This company also had a location in downtown South Bend; unlike Sears, representatives of JCPenney stated they had no intentions to close the downtown store or any others in the Michiana area. DeBartolo acquired a permit to open an L. S. Ayres store at the mall in October 1977. Also undergoing negotiations for a possible tenancy at the mall was Robertson's, a local department store which operated in downtown South Bend as well. By March 1978, negotiations with Carson Pirie Scott, William H. Block Co., and Robertson's had all been withdrawn. Representatives from Gamble-Skogmo, the parent company of Robertson's, stated that they chose to retain the downtown store as they did not think the closure of Sears would negatively impact it or other businesses downtown. These representatives also thought that opening a store at the mall would potentially draw business away from the downtown store. Detroit, Michigan-based Hudson's was confirmed as the fourth anchor store in July 1978. The two-story, 122,000-square-foot (11,300 m^{2}) store would be their first in the state of Indiana.

=== 1979–1980s: Opening and early years ===
Sears opened for business on March 1, 1979, ahead of the rest of the mall. The 196,000-square-foot (18,200 m^{2}) store featured a 17-bay automobile repair shop, a dedicated area for catalog orders, and a centralized solar heating unit. Opening ceremonies of the store were attended by Miss Indiana 1978 Terry Jean Kaiser and local sportscaster Tom Denin. The former Sears in downtown South Bend was closed in favor of this store; by February 1980, the downtown location was converted to a Chevrolet dealership.

University Park Mall opened for business on March 14, 1979, with a ribbon-cutting ceremony. Nearly 70 of the 100 inline stores were open for business that day, including Sears; L. S. Ayres was targeted for a May opening, with JCPenney and Hudson's both slated to open by 1980. Overall, about 95 percent of the mall's space was leased on opening day. A directory published in the South Bend Tribune on opening day showed the mall had a large number of restaurants such as Chick-fil-A, Hot Sam, Orange Julius, Bresler's 33 Flavors, Burger Chef, and Wag's. Also present were Osco Drug, Brown's Sporting Goods, and a three-screen movie theater. The two-story, 120,000-square-foot (11,000 m^{2}) L. S. Ayres store opened on May 6, 1979, representing the 13th location in the chain. By the time L. S. Ayres opened, 17 other stores within the mall had done so as well. It was followed by JCPenney on January 2, 1980. Consisting of 144,000 square feet (13,400 m^{2}), the store also featured a restaurant, automotive repair, and an area for catalog orders. Hudson's became the last anchor store to open, doing so on February 7, 1980. Three days before Hudson's opened for business, the South Bend Symphony hosted a preview ceremony for the store. For a donation of $15 each, 500 local residents were allowed to tour the store, while also being served champagne and hors d'oeuvres alongside performances by the symphony and a fashion show.

During the 1981 Christmas season, a large number of workers at University Park and Scottsdale malls expressed concerns over both malls' policies that employees park further away from the mall property to leave spots closer to the mall available for shoppers. Many of these workers were fined or fired for refusing to comply with this policy, as they feared becoming assaulted in the parking lot at night. In response to this, the managers of both malls confirmed that such a policy was common at the time, and that University Park employed over 20 off-duty police officers as part of its security force to ensure the safety of workers and patrons returning to their cars.

University Park Mall had a significant impact on retail in the area throughout the 1980s and onward. As Scottsdale Mall was located in a residential area far off a major highway, many stores that had locations at both malls (such as The Limited and Spencer Gifts) closed their Scottsdale locations in favor of focusing on the University Park locations, creating a number of vacancies at Scottsdale throughout the 1980s. In turn, a number of retail developments were built around University Park Mall. One of the first was Indian Ridge Plaza, located across the Indiana Toll Road from the mall. This center opened in 1987 with a TJ Maxx as one of its major tenants. Four years later, city council approved zoning for a shopping center named University Center to be built across from the mall along Grape Road. General Cinema Corporation, which operated the three-screen theater in the mall, built another complex with six screens outside the mall in 1986.

=== 1990s ===
The DeBartolo corporation announced a renovation of University Park Mall in 1995, with estimated costs of $15,000,000. As part of this project, the L. S. Ayres store would be expanded by about 33,000 square feet (3,100 m^{2}), and a food court with ten restaurants would be added near Sears. Coinciding with this expansion, the interior of the mall received new décor with images intended to reflect celebrities native to Indiana, such as David Letterman and James Dean. Also joining the mall during the renovation were Aéropostale, Disney Store, Eddie Bauer, and Gymboree. Expiration on the leases of original stores allowed for these and other stores to join the mall, as part of what mall owners termed a "re-merchandising". During these renovations, the DeBartolo corporation merged with Melvin Simon & Associates to form Simon Property Group, a move which the mall's manager confirmed would not affect operations or the condition of the renovations. By March 1996, shortly before the merger occurred, tenants confirmed for the food court included Charleys Philly Steaks, Panda Express, and a relocation of Chick-fil-A.

In 1997, Dayton-Hudson Corporation (now Target Corporation), owners of the Hudson's chain, converted all of the Hudson's stores outside the state of Michigan to Chicago-based Marshall Field's, of which they were then-owner as well. This decision was made due to a perception that the Hudson's name lacked recognition in Indiana when compared to Marshall Field's. Between late 1999 and early 2000, further lease expirations resulted in the closures of Lechters Housewares, Osco Drug, and Bresler's 33 Flavors. This allowed for mall owners to sign leases with other new tenants, such as The Children's Place. The original three-screen theater in the mall closed in March 2000, due to expiration of its lease and competition from larger theaters which had opened throughout the 1990s. By 2001, the former cinema space had been re-divided among several other stores, one of which was PacSun.

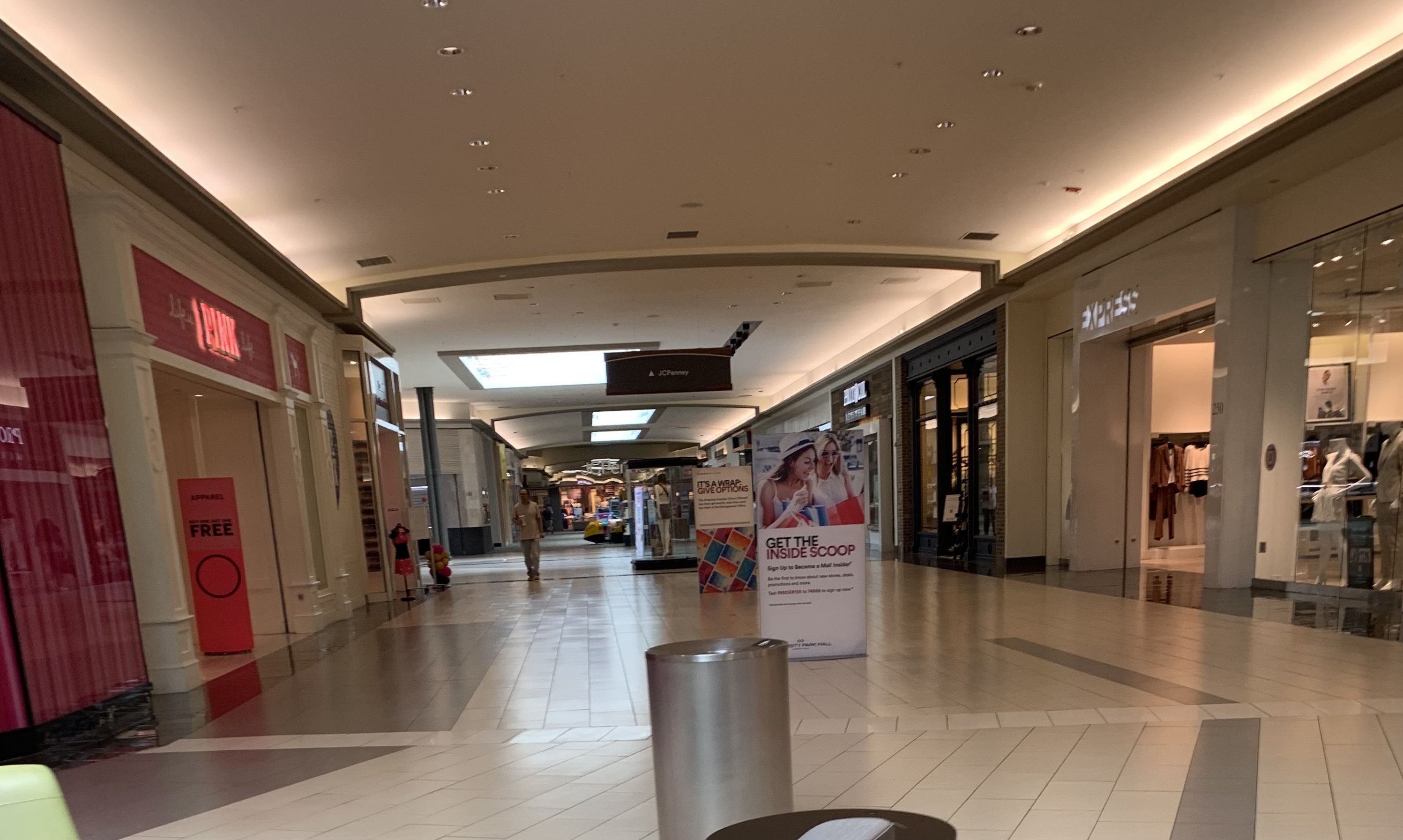
A wing of the mall in 2024

=== 21st century ===
University Park Mall underwent several store closures in 2006. These included KB Toys, Sam Goody, Casual Corner, and the Marshall Field's department store. Mall management attributed the closures to the condition of the retail sector at the time, noting that these were among the retailers which were undergoing bankruptcies or consolidations. In particular, Marshall Field's was closed due to both it and L. S. Ayres coming under the ownership of Federated Department Stores (now Macy's, Inc.), which was consolidating all of its brands to the Macy's name. As a result, the company chose to close the Marshall Field's location and convert the L. S. Ayres to Macy's. Following the closure of Marshall Field's in March 2006, Simon Property Group announced plans to demolish the location in favor of smaller stores. By 2008, the former site of Marshall Field's had been cleared for a series of stores in a lifestyle center section called the Village. Among the stores confirmed to open at this point were Barnes & Noble, Five Guys, Ulta Beauty, Bar Louie, Lane Bryant, and Jared. All of these were to be arranged along an outward-facing courtyard. Barnes & Noble opened for business on April 8, 2009, relocating from an older store on Grape Road in the process.

Following the opening of Barnes & Noble, University Park Mall continued to attract new tenants. One of these was Apple Store, opened in November 2010. A spokesperson for Simon Property Group stated that Apple chose to open a store in the South Bend area due to the presence of the University of Notre Dame. In 2011, University Park Mall and 20 other malls owned by Simon Property Group became among the first in the nation to offer charging stations for electric vehicles. Simon announced a second renovation of the mall in December 2013. These consisted of adding new flooring and lighting, along with carpeting in the JCPenney wing and a reconstruction of the restrooms. At the time, University Park Mall held a 95 percent occupancy rate, and had recently added more upscale tenants to complement Apple Store, such as Coach and Michael Kors. By July 2014, renovations to the food court had been reconfigured to have more seating, while also adding a second restroom complex for families with small children. Additionally, rue21 and Starbucks joined the mall, and several kiosk shops along the main concourse were reconfigured. Although Gap closed at the mall in 2016, a number of other tenants opened that same year, including Dry Goods, a clothing store owned by Von Maur.

More stores closed at the mall between 2018 and 2019. One of these was Ulta Beauty, which moved across Grape Road to a larger store in 2018. Sears closed its location at the mall in late 2019 as part of a series of store closings for the chain. The closure ended the chain's 91-year history in the South Bend area. Also closing at the mall in 2019 were Gymboree, Things Remembered, Charlotte Russe, and Payless ShoeSource, all due to the respective bankruptcies of those brands. Despite these closures, Simon representatives expressed confidence in replacing these with other retailers. University Park Mall was shuttered in March 2020 at the start of the COVID-19 pandemic, but reopened for business a month later alongside 49 other malls owned by Simon. Despite this, several individual stores within the mall did not immediately reopen. JCPenney was one such store, not reopening until May. Disney Store also chose not to reopen its University Park Mall location, announcing in July 2020 that it would be closing permanently.

In September 2020, a 23-year-old man was killed in a shooting outside JCPenney. Another shooting occurred at the mall in 2022, and a third in May 2024. The mall held a second ribbon-cutting ceremony in March 2024 in honor of its 45th anniversary. Mishawaka mayor Dave Wood and representatives of Simon Property Group were present. These festivities coincided with the addition of several new stores, including KPot Korean Hotpot & BBQ and a LoveSac furniture store. Despite the Sears space remaining vacant, University Park Mall continues to hold an occupancy rate above 90 percent. A 2023 report by USA Today cited University Park Mall as an example of a shopping mall which had remained viable in spite of the large number of store closures in the retail apocalypse and decreased shopper traffic during the pandemic.

== See also ==
- List of shopping malls in the United States
- List of Simon Property Group properties
