= Wolf & Dessauer =

American department store chain

- Industry: Retail
- Genre: Department stores
- Founded: 1896; 130 years ago in Fort Wayne, Indiana, United States
- Founder: Sam Wolf and Myron Eisman Dessauer
- Defunct: December 2, 1969; 56 years ago
- Fate: Acquisition by L.S. Ayres
- Successor: L.S. Ayres
- Headquarters: Fort Wayne, Indiana, United States
- Key people: Sam Wolf; Myron Dessauer; G. Irving Latz; G. Irving Latz II; William Latz
- Parent: City Stores (1966–1969)

Wolf & Dessauer was an American department store founded in 1896 by Sam Wolf and Myron Eisman Dessauer in Fort Wayne, Indiana.

== History ==
The store was located at 808 South Calhoun Street until 1904 and at 119 West Berry Street from 1904 to 1918. From 1918 to 1959, it was located on the northeast corner of Calhoun Street and Washington Boulevard. This location was a six-story, white terra-building which gained the nickname of "the white elephant."

A second store was opened in Huntington, Indiana in 1952. This location would close in 1969.

The final location of the business was on the northeast corner of Clinton and Wayne Streets. The building is now known as Citizens Square and houses the City of Fort Wayne's municipal government.

=== Lighting displays ===
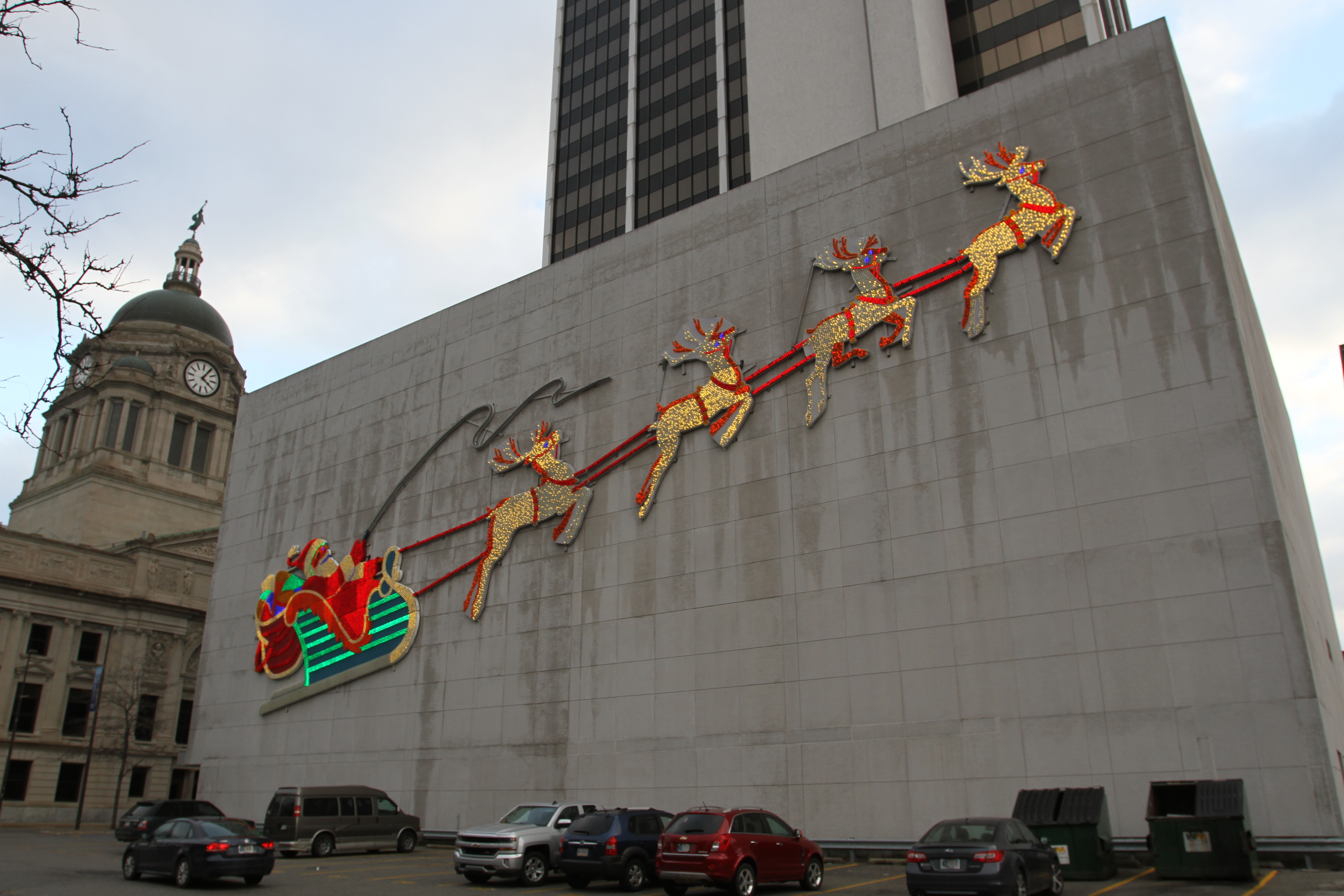
"Santa and His Reindeer" display on the PNC Bank Building in 2018

Beginning in 1928, Wolf & Dessauer displayed Christmas-themed animated windows. In 1937, the "Santa and His Reindeer" and "Merry Christmas Wreaths" lighting displays were also introduced for the holiday season. The lights and displays continue to be displayed annually in Fort Wayne as part of Downtown Fort Wayne's HolidayFest featuring "Night of Lights".

== Ownership ==
In 1920, the business was sold to general manager G. Irving Latz. In 1966, the company was sold to City Stores, and in 1969, to L. S. Ayres. The downtown store continued to operate as an Ayres location before closing in 1979.

== See also ==
- List of defunct department stores of the United States
