= Lyman S. Ayres =

American businessman (1824–1896)

Lyman Skinner Ayres
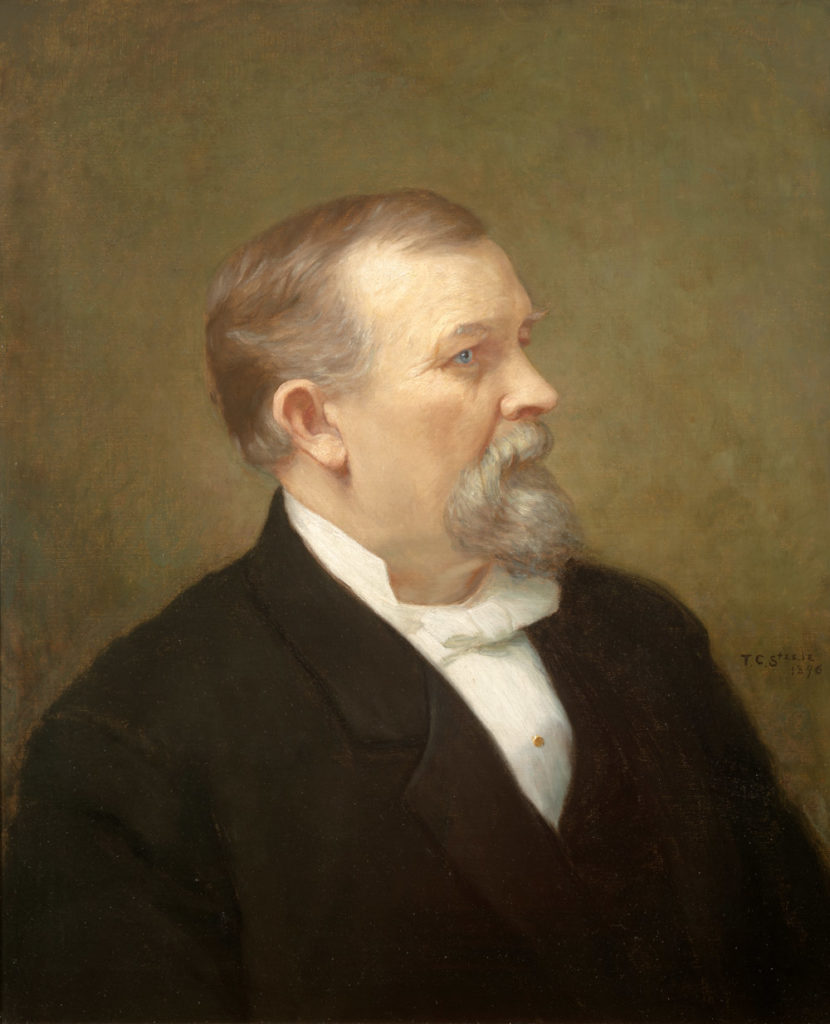
- Born: September 4, 1824; Oswego, New York, US
- Died: May 7, 1896 (aged 71); Crown Hill Cemetery and Arboretum, Indianapolis, Indiana, U.S.
- Resting place: Section 11, Lot 19; 39.8166841°N 86.1739774°W
- Occupation: Department store owner
- Known for: L. S. Ayres and Company
- Spouse: Maria Helen Murray
- Children: Frederick, Katherine, Robert (died in infancy), and Emma Murray (adopted in infancy)

Lyman Skinner Ayres I (September 4, 1824 – May 7, 1896) was the founder of L. S. Ayres and Company, a regional department store chain whose flagship store and headquarters were located in Indianapolis, Indiana. The L. S. Ayres and Company name remained in use for 132 years.

== Early life ==
Ayres was born on September 4, 1824, on a farm near Oswego, New York. He was one of six children born to Thomas Floyd and Marian Jones Ayres. (Thomas and his second wife had one child.) Lyman disliked farming and left home as a teenager to work as a peddler. He spent four to five years in Ashtabula, Lake, and Geauga counties in Ohio, and established a general store in Chardon, Ohio, with a business partner named John Murray.

Ayres met his first wife in Chardon, Ohio, but she died of consumption (tuberculosis) within a few months of their marriage. In 1862 Ayres married Maria Helen Murray, his business partner's sister. Ayres and his wife had three children: Frederick, Katherine, and Robert (died in infancy). The couple adopted Emma Murray, their niece, as an infant. She became known as Emma Murray Ayres.

== L. S. Ayres and Company ==
Ayres sold his interest in the general store at Chardon in 1864 and moved to Geneva, New York, where he and his New York business partner, James G. Thomas, managed a dry goods business named Ayres and Thomas. In 1872 Ayres sold his interest in the firm and purchased controlling interest in the Trade Palace, an established dry goods store operated by N. R. Smith at 26–28 W. Washington Street in Indianapolis, Indiana. The store was renamed N. R. Smith and Ayres. James Thomas, Ayres's business partner in New York, acquired a 25 percent interest in the Indianapolis store. Ayres remained in New York for two years as the Indianapolis store's senior partner and its resident buyer. He took over active management of the Indianapolis store in 1874, when the store's name first appeared as L. S. Ayres and Company. Ayres and his family relocated to Indianapolis in 1875. The family lived at 656 N. Delaware Street and later moved to 1204 N. Delaware Street. Their second home was demolished in 1962 as part of the city's urban renewal efforts and highway construction projects.

In 1875, the Ayres department store was moved across the street to a larger three-story building at 33–37 W. Washington Street. Ayres became the sole proprietor of L. S. Ayres and Company in 1895, when Thomas retired from the business. Ayres was known for his generosity and friendliness to employees and customers. Under his management from 1874 to 1896, the store expanded its operations and the staff increased to 175 employees.

== Death and legacy ==
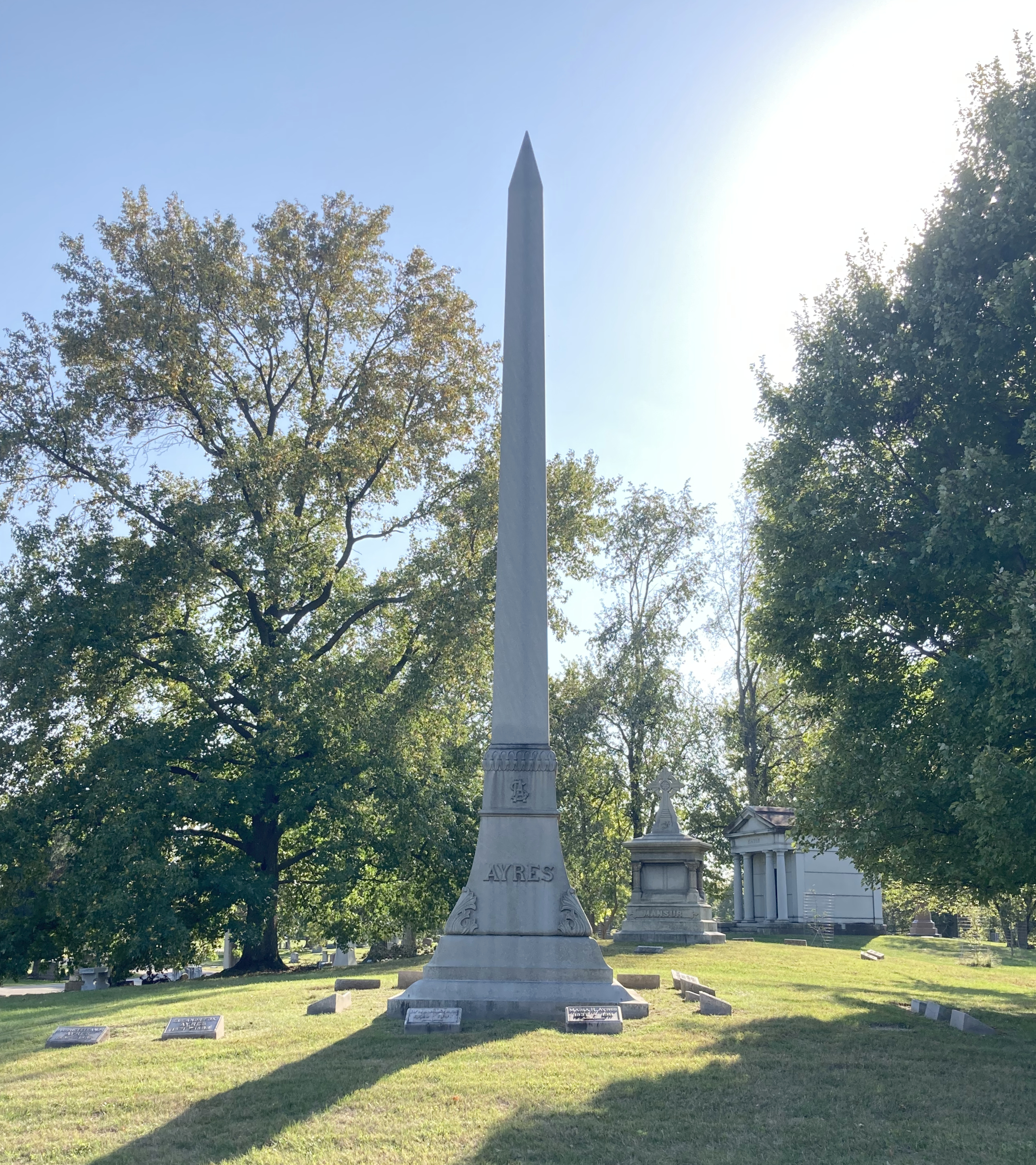
Ayres's grave at Crown Hill Cemetery

Ayres died of chronic nephritis on May 7, 1896, in Indianapolis. The value of his estate at the time of his death was estimated at $600,000 to $700,000. He is buried at Crown Hill Cemetery in Indianapolis.

Before his death Ayres had begun to acquire property at the intersection of Washington and Meridian streets, where he intended to build a new store. Frederic M. Ayres took over the business following his father's death and completed construction of an eight-story building that opened in 1905. The Ayres family retained ownership of the department store after Frederic's death in 1940. Several family members served the business in executive positions. Theodore B. Griffith succeeded Frederic Ayres, his father-in law, as head of the company. Lyman S. Ayres II, Fredric's son and grandson of the store's founder, followed Griffith as president and later became chairman of the board. L. S. Ayres and Company was acquired by Associated Dry Goods in 1972. Lyman S. Ayres II retired the following year and the company was dissolved. Associated Dry Goods was acquired by The May Company in 1986, which merged with Federated Department Stores (now Macy's, Inc.) in 2005.
