= Macy's Midwest =

Former division of Macy's, Inc

- Company type: Subsidiary
- Industry: Retail
- Predecessor: The May Department Stores Company
- Founded: 1981; 45 years ago
- Defunct: 2008
- Fate: Merged with other division within Macy's
- Successor: Macy's Central
- Headquarters: St. Louis, Missouri, United States
- Area served: Midwest United States
- Parent: Macy's, Inc.

Macy's Midwest was an American division of Macy's, Inc. based in St. Louis, Missouri. It had operations in New York, Illinois, Indiana, Kansas, Kentucky, Missouri, Ohio, Pennsylvania and West Virginia. In 2008, Macy's Midwest division merged with Macy's South to form Macy's Central.

== History ==
It was created February 1, 2006 from a reorganization of the Famous-Barr division acquired August 30, 2005 with The May Department Stores Company. It also incorporated the Macy's stores operating in western Pennsylvania (Pittsburgh) and the majority of the Kaufmann's stores operated by Filene's. An additional realignment of store operations with Macy's South and Macy's North occurred July 30, 2006, with a further transfer of stores with Macy's South to occur by early 2007. On September 9, 2006, the Famous-Barr, L.S. Ayres, The Jones Store and Kaufmann's nameplates were phased out in favor of the nationally known Macy's. In 2008, Macy's Midwest merged with Macy's South to form Macy's Central. Macy's Central later merged with Macy's East and West and further consolidated with the holding company.

There was a prior division of R.H. Macy & Co., Inc. named Macy's Midwest, formed in 1981, headquartered in Kansas City, Missouri. It operated stores in Missouri, Kansas and Ohio. The former division itself was created from a consolidation of two Macy's divisions, Lasalle's (Toledo, Ohio) and Macy's Missouri-Kansas, in 1982. It was merged with Davison's, to form Macy's Atlanta on February 1, 1985. Its former Lasalle's stores were sold to Elder-Beerman in 1985 and its former Missouri-Kansas stores were sold to Dillard's in 1986.

Lasalle's (The Lasalle & Koch Co.) was purchased by R.H. Macy & Co. in 1923. It operated as a division of Macy's, with offices in the downtown Toledo Lasalle's store at 513 Adams Street, until the consolidation in 1982.
