= L. S. Ayres =

Former department store based in Indianapolis, Indiana, U.S.

L. S. Ayres & Co.
- Type: Subsidiary
- Industry: Retail (Department stores)
- Founded: 1872; 154 years ago in Indianapolis, Indiana
- Founder: Lyman S. Ayres
- Defunct: September 9, 2006; 20 years ago
- Fate: Acquired by Macy's
- Successor: Macy's
- Headquarters: Indianapolis, Indiana
- Number of locations: 14 (at peak in 2006; L.S. Ayres only)
- Area served: Indiana; Springfield, Illinois; Louisville, Kentucky; and Cincinnati, Ohio
- Products: Clothing, footwear, home furnishings, jewelry, beauty products, and housewares
- Parent: Associated Dry Goods (1972–1986); The May Department Stores Company (1986–2005); Federated Department Stores, Inc. (2005–2006)
- Divisions: Ayres Department Stores, Inc.; Bressmer's (The John Bressmer Company); Ayr-Way Stores; Ayr-Way Quality Foods; Murray Showrooms; and Murray Investments
- Subsidiaries: Kaufman-Straus, Sycamore Shops, Cygnet Shops, and Wolf & Dessauer
- Website: Archived official website at the Wayback Machine (archive index)

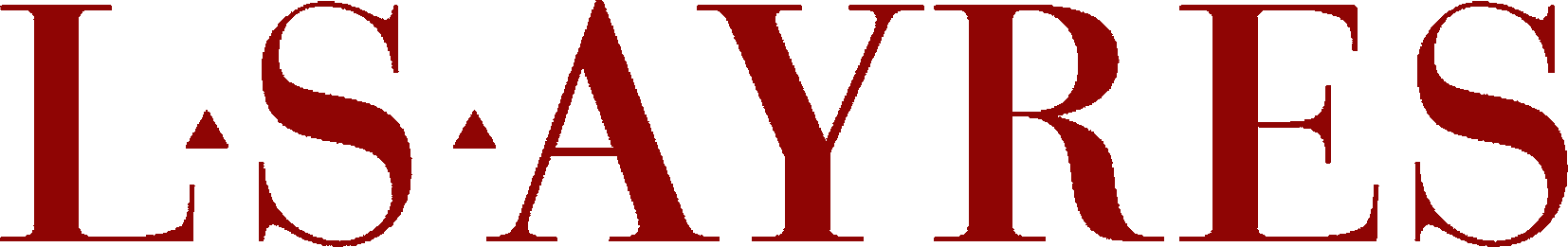
L.S. Ayres Department Store Final Logo

L. S. Ayres and Company was a department store based in Indianapolis, Indiana, and founded in 1872 by Lyman S. Ayres. Over the years its Indianapolis flagship store, which opened in 1905 and was later enlarged, became known for its women's fashions, the Tea Room, holiday events and displays, and the basement budget store. As urban populations shifted to the suburbs, Ayres established branch stores in new shopping centers in several Indiana cities. Ayres also acquired retail subsidiaries in Springfield, Illinois; Fort Wayne, Indiana; and Louisville, Kentucky. Ayr-Way, the Ayres discount store subsidiary, became the first discount store launched by a full-line department store. By the end of the 1960s Ayres had become a diversified merchandising business with retail department stores, a chain of discount stores, specialty clothing stores, a home furnishings showroom, and a real estate holding company. A long-time Ayres slogan, "That Ayres Look", promoted the company as a fashion leader, and by 1972 it had become the oldest continuous retail slogan in the United States.

Associated Dry Goods acquired Ayres in 1972. After The May Company acquired Associated Dry Goods in 1986, several Ayres stores were closed. The flagship store in Indianapolis was closed in the spring of 1992 as the remaining Ayres operation merged with May's Famous-Barr division. Federated Department Stores, owner of rival Macy's, acquired The May Company on August 30, 2005. On February 1, 2006, L. S. Ayres was dissolved and folded into the newly formed Macy's Midwest division. On September 9, 2006, the L. S. Ayres name was retired as most stores were converted to Macy's.

== History ==
=== Origins in Indianapolis ===
Lyman S. Ayres, who owned a dry-goods store in Geneva, New York, founded a new firm in Indianapolis, Indiana, in 1872, the year in which he bought controlling interest in N. R. Smith and Company, a dry-goods store that was also known as the Trade Palace. The store was located at 26–28 West Washington Street in Indianapolis. The new store, renamed N. R. Smith and Ayres, opened in January 1872. Ayres bought out Smith's interest in the store in 1874. The name "L. S. Ayres & Co." appeared in February 1874 in an Indianapolis newspaper advertisement. In 1875, Ayres relocated the store across the street to 33–37 West Washington Street, where it remained for thirty years as L. S. Ayres and Company. The store called itself a "First Class One Price Establishment" and offered merchandise with uniform quality and price, concepts that were unusual for that time. During the first half of the 20th century, Ayres grew to become one of Indianapolis's leading department stores. In Indianapolis its department store competitors were the William H. Block Company, the H. P. Wasson and Company, and L. S. Strauss and Company. Beginning in 1972, the Lazarus department store chain arrived in Indianapolis as it absorbed the Block's stores. All of these stores offered a full line of merchandise, but Ayres was especially known for its women's fashions.

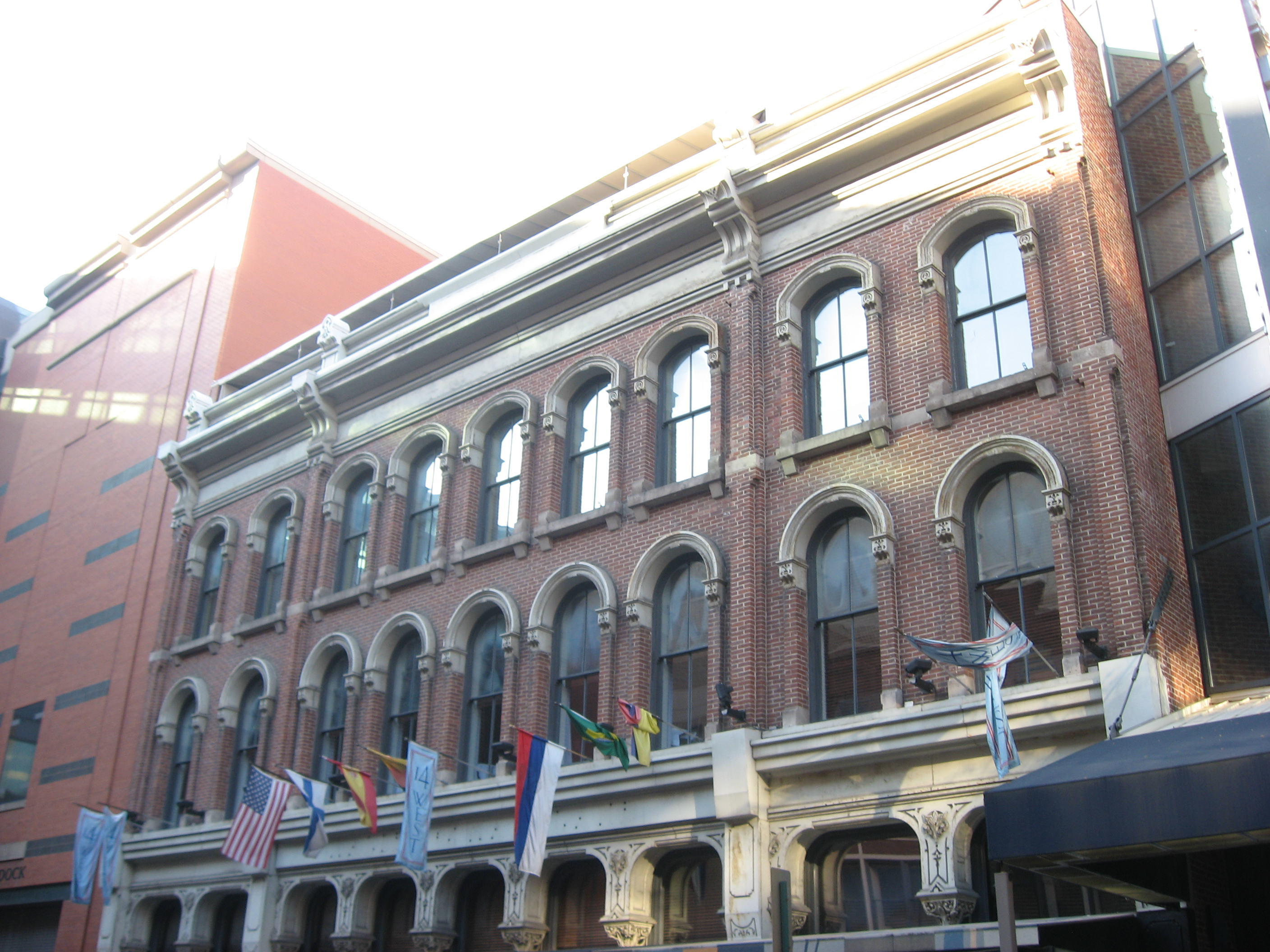
The former L. S. Ayres Annex Warehouse at 14–22 W. Maryland Street, south of the main store, is listed on the National Register of Historic Places.

For several years prior to his death in 1896, Lyman had been purchasing real estate along Meridian and Washington streets in Indianapolis, where he intended to build a new store at the intersection of these two prominent downtown streets. Designed by the Indianapolis architectural firm of Vonnegut and Bohn, the new eight-story flagship store opened on October 3, 1905, with more than 3 acres (130,000 sq ft; 12,000 m^{2}) of selling space. The landmark store at One West Washington Street was enlarged several times. The store's first major expansion was completed in 1915 and doubled the store's size and its frontage along Washington Street. Beginning in the 1920s the company acquired property along Meridian Street, south of its main store, including the old Chamber of Commerce building, and opened the South Building on September 14, 1929. By this time the store complex was 475,000 sq ft (44,129 m^{2}) in size. After World War II, an eleven-story addition to the flagship store completed along Meridian Street, adjacent to the South Building. In the 1950s, downtown Indianapolis began to deteriorate as businesses moved outside the city center; however, Ayres continued to buy real estate adjacent to its downtown store. The company bought several old buildings near its flagship store, tore them down, created surface parking on the vacant lots, and later built two parking garages to entice suburban shoppers to drive downtown and park near its store.

Despite Ayres's efforts to improve its Indianapolis flagship store, the city's downtown had declined by the 1970s and the West Washington Street store was surrounded by empty lots and vacant buildings. To encourage economic development of the area, Ayres and others invested in two downtown hotel developments in an effort to attract convention and tourism business. Ayres contributed $3.3 million to development of a downtown Hilton Hotel, which later became a Sheraton Hotel, and $50,000 to the Merchants Plaza project, where a Hyatt Regency Hotel and Merchants Bank offices occupied most of its space.

==== Expansion of the Ayres 1905 flagship complex ====
Expansion of the Ayres 1905 flagship complex
Date	Additions	Architects	Sq ft	Sq m
October 3, 1905	Original One W. Washington Street building, 8 stories. Replaced the Hubbard Block.	Vonnegut & Bohn	105,000	9,755
Built 1914	Added an annex on the site of the Iron Block, which burned down in Jan. 1914: #9-11 Washington St. (Bobbs & Merrill stationery) and #13-15 (Besten & Langen store). The addition roughly doubled the size of the Ayres store.	Vonnegut, Bohn, and Mueller	~210,000	~19,510
by 1920	Additional 34 ft (10 m) to the west, for a total of 135 ft (41 m) feet along Washington.		~280,000	~26,013
by 1928	L.S. Ayres Annex Warehouse, Haueisen property, #14-22 Maryland St. (67.5 ft (21 m) of frontage). Used for storage as of 1928.			
Built 1926, opened Sep 14, 1929	South Building, 30-32 S. Meridian; 11 full stories + 2 story penthouse+ 2 basement levels; 7 elevators. Added 90% more floorspace to the complex. Over the 1920s Ayres had acquired space southwards, including: Air rights over Pearl Street, over which Ayres built a multi-story bridge; Chamber of Commerce Building (#26-30 S. Meridian, 46 feet of frontage, at cost of $335,000) in 1928.; #32 S. Meridian (23 feet of frontage) in 1926	Vonnegut, Bohn, and Mueller	425,000	39,484
1936	L. S. Ayres Clock installed			
1941	Burford printing plant to the west along Pearl Street, added to store			
1941	Part of Stutz Motor Co., 10th and Capitol. Used as workhouse, warehouse and delivery garage.			
1946	11-story addition at 38-40 S. Meridian St. (38.5-foot frontage), on south side of Pearl St., on site of William B. Burford store. 50,000 sq ft (4,645 m^{2}) added space. Cost $500,000.	Skidmore, Owings & Merrill	475,000	44,129

==== Current use ====
1-7 W. Washington and 30 S. Meridian were retrofitted in 1997 by Browning Investments & Hagerman Construction for use as an office building and Parisian, later Carson's, department store, anchoring a new Circle Centre Mall. Carson's closed in 2018 and space is currently vacant.

=== Suburban expansion ===
As urban populations shifted outward to suburban areas, Ayres moved closer to its customers by establishing branch stores in Indianapolis and Lafayette, Indiana. In 1959, Ayres also opened a large warehouse facility and service center on Hillside Avenue in Indianapolis. In 1965, a new branch store opened in the Greenwood Shopping Center, ten miles (16 km) south of the Indianapolis flagship store. In 1966, Ayres opened a new branch store at Glenbrook Square in Fort Wayne, Indiana. In addition to building new branch stores in Indiana, Ayres acquired a retail subsidiary, The John Bressmer Company in Springfield, Illinois, in 1958 and created Ayr-Way, a chain of self-service discount stores. In 1969 Ayres expanded into Louisville, Kentucky, with the acquisition of Kaufman-Straus Company, a retail division of City Stores Corporation. The declining downtown Louisville store was not profitable and Ayres closed it within two years of its purchase. In 1973, Ayres installed an Ayr-Way discount store in the downtown Louisville location, but that also failed and closed in 1975. Two suburban Louisville locations were later merged into Ayres's Indianapolis operations. The City Stores deal also included the acquisition of Wolf & Dessauer (W&D), a leading department store in downtown Fort Wayne, Indiana. In the late 1960s, Ayres also entered the field of specialty retailing with the establishment of the Sycamore Shops and Cygnet Shops to cater to young adults.

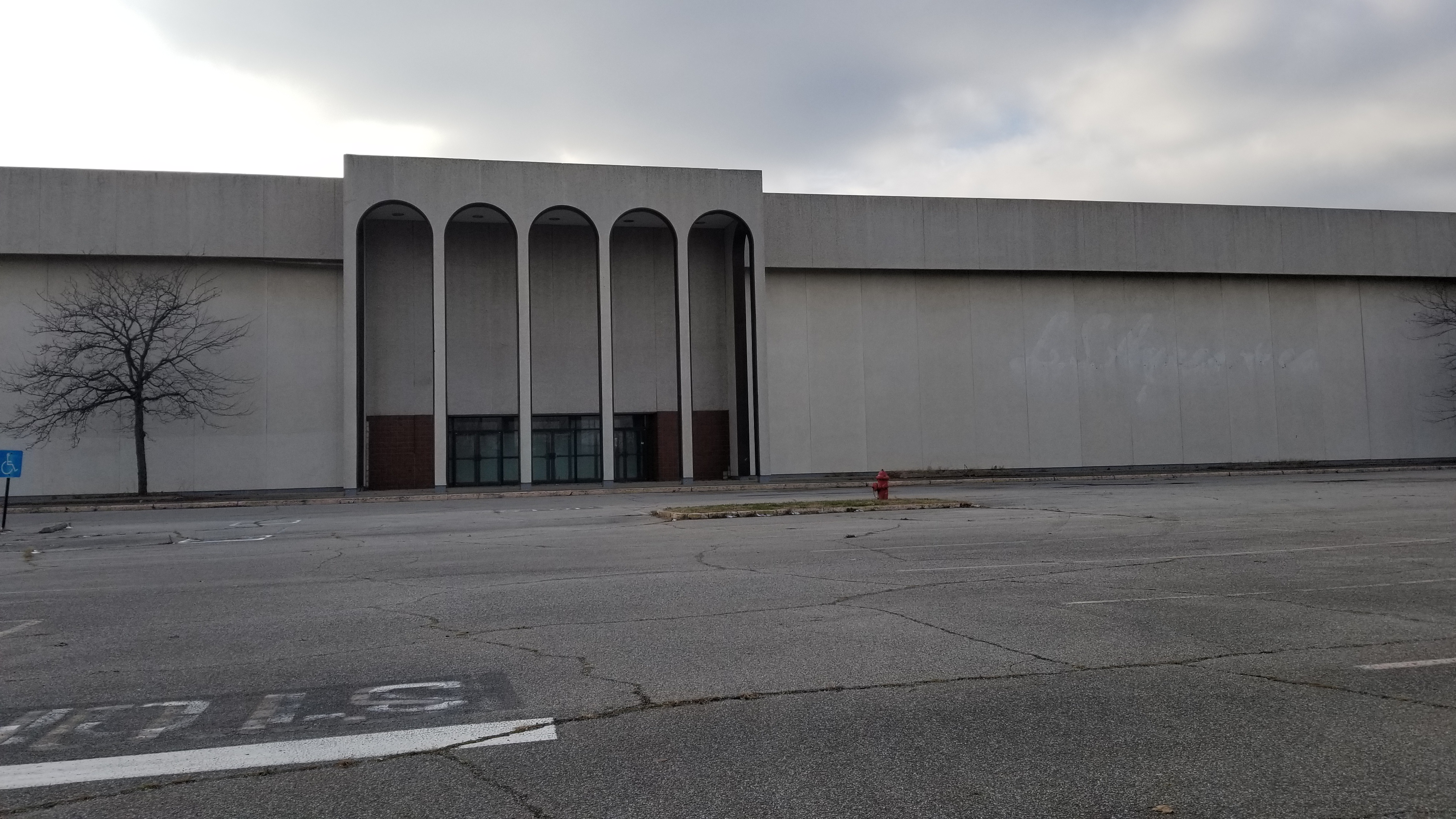
Former L. S. Ayres store at Lafayette Square Mall

By the end of the 1960s, Ayres had expanded from department stores into a diversified merchandising business that included the Ayres flagship store in Indianapolis and its branches in Indiana, three subsidiary department stores (Bressmer's, Kaufman's, and W & D), a new chain of discount stores (Ayr-Way and Ayr-Way Discount Foods), specialty stores (Sycamore Shops and Cygnet), a high-end home furnishing shop (Murray Showrooms), and a real estate investment company (Murray Investments).

=== Acquisition ===
In 1972, Ayres was acquired by Associated Dry Goods of New York City. Announced on January 26, 1972, the sale, which exchanged Ayres stock for 1.4 million common shares of Associated Dry Goods stock, was equivalent, at that time, to a purchase price of $78.5 million (~$458 million in 2025). In 1983, Associated Dry Goods merged Cincinnati, Ohio-based Pogue's with Ayres. Pogue's stores were renamed L. S. Ayres and Company in 1984 and received $7 million (~$18.3 million in 2025) in renovations. In 1985, the Louisville, Kentucky-based Stewart Dry Goods stores were absorbed into Ayres. With strong competition from other retailers, declining profits, and a decaying downtown Louisville, the Stewart Dry Goods stores were renamed L. S. Ayres and Company in 1987 and Ayres spent $6.5 million (~$15.8 million in 2025) to remodel the downtown store.

In 1986, Associated Dry Goods was acquired by The May Department Stores Company in a stock swap valued, at that time, at approximately $2.47 billion (~$6.14 billion in 2025). Between 1986 and 1990, several Ayres chairmen and CEOs arrived and departed as the May Company tried to improve Ayres's profitability, which also included store closings in Louisville and Cincinnati. In the late 1980s, the May Company shuttered the former Pogue's and Stewart's locations, reducing the number of Ayres locations to fourteen. Three Ayres stores in Cincinnati at Tri-County Mall, Kenwood Towne Centre, and Northgate Mall, were sold to J. C. Penney in 1988. All three stores have since been closed or relocated. In April 1991, a May spokesperson announced that the Ayres flagship store would not be a part of Indianapolis's proposed Circle Centre mall. The project, adjacent to the downtown Ayres store, was already under construction. It was no surprise when May announced on October 25, 1991, that the downtown Indianapolis Ayres store would close, as would three of its Indiana branches. Also in 1991, the Ayres operations merged with the St. Louis, Missouri-headquartered Famous-Barr division of May, although the Ayres nameplate was retained. Parisian opened a store in the Ayres downtown Indianapolis space in 1995; Carson's replaced the Parisian store in 2007 and it closed in 2018.

Federated Department Stores acquired Macy's in 1994 and The May Department Stores Company in 2005. On February 1, 2006, Ayres was subsumed into the newly created Macy's Midwest (now Macy's Central). Most of the Ayres locations became Macy's stores, with the exception of the Greenwood Park Mall and Castleton Square stores in the Indianapolis suburbs, where the existing Lazarus locations were retained as the surviving Macy's store. The Ayres stores at the Greenwood Park Mall and Castleton Square were later demolished.

== Stores and subsidiaries ==
=== Flagship store ===
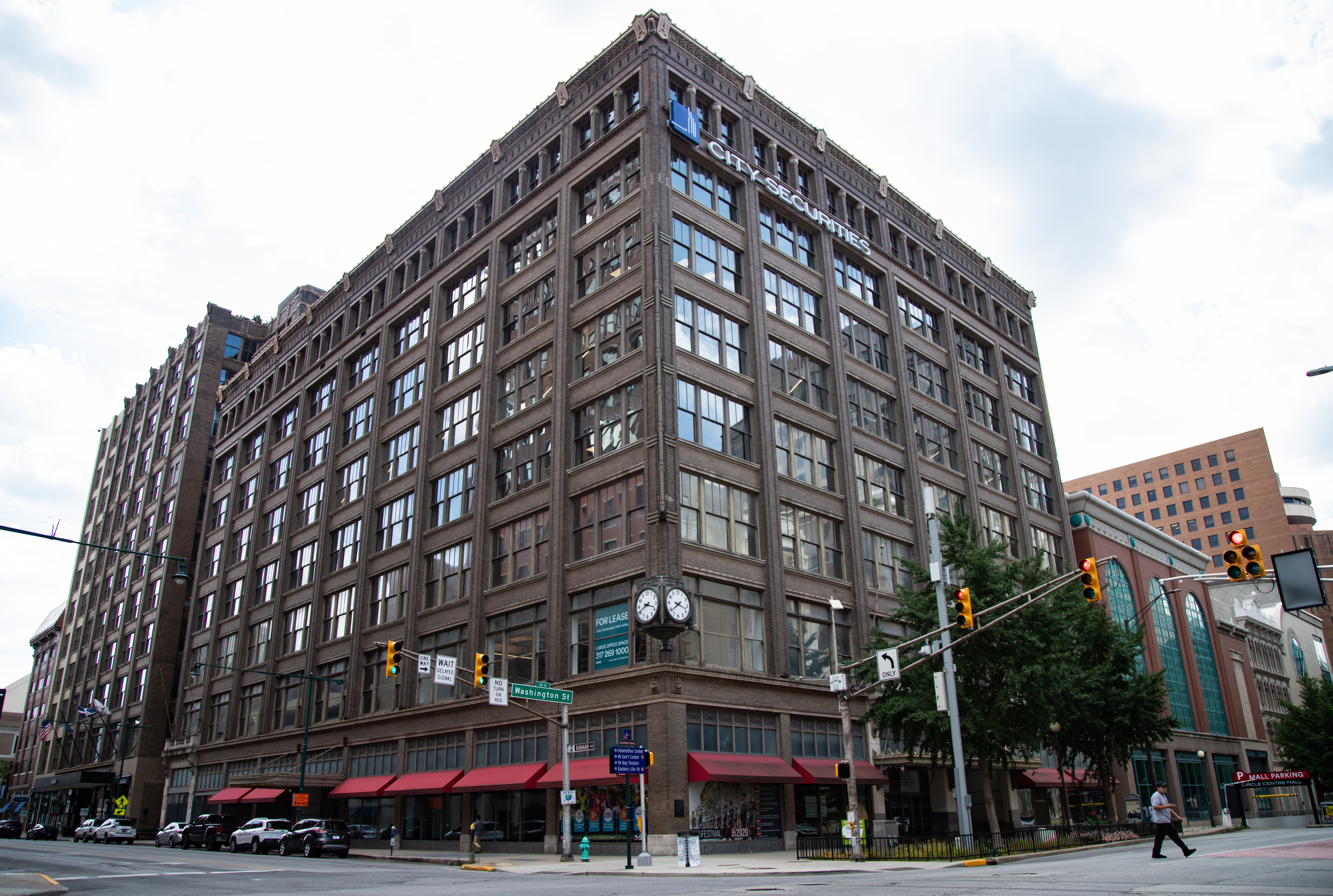
L. S. Ayres flagship department store building in downtown Indianapolis

Ayres offered a full line of merchandise and services, but it was especially known for women's fashions and its Tea Room, Christmas events and displays, and the budget store.

The Tea Room, which operated at the Indianapolis flagship store from 1905 to 1990, served shoppers in a formal setting. Its purpose was to entice shoppers into the downtown store; the restaurant itself never operated at a profit. The local gathering spot also provided informal modeling of store fashions for its diners, who were predominantly women. The menu, which remained consistent for decades, included favorites such as chicken pot pie, chicken velvet soup, and special desserts for children The Tea Room has been re-created at the Indiana State Museum in Indianapolis. Over the years, in-store food options at the Indianapolis flagship store also included a soda fountain, a basement coffee and snack bar, and, in the 1970s, a cafeteria-style tea room on the balcony overlooking the main floor. Ayres branch stores also included cafeterias and tea rooms. The downtown Indianapolis Tea Room survived until 1990. The other restaurants closed after Ayres was acquired by the May Company in 1986.

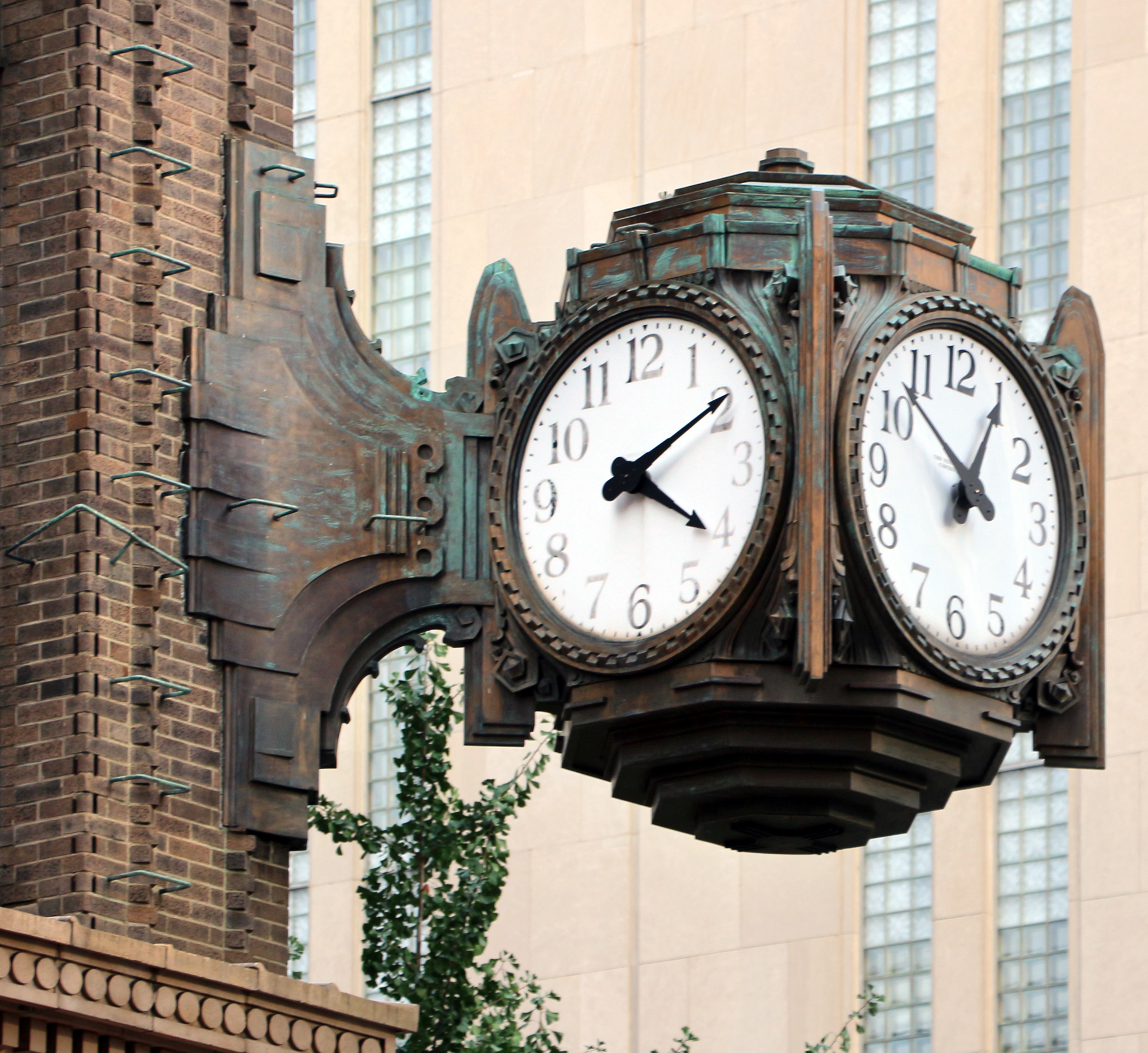
The Ayres Clock at Washington and Meridian streets is a landmark at the former flagship L. S. Ayres department store in downtown Indianapolis. The 1905 building was incorporated into Circle Centre Mall in the 1990s.

Ayres's seasonal departments, events, and displays earned the company media coverage and drew thousands of visitors to Ayres with the hope they would stay and shop. On the night before Thanksgiving in 1947, a bronze cherub appeared on the Indianapolis flagship store's large, outdoor clock at the corner of Meridian and Washington Streets. The three-foot cherub remained on the clock until Christmas, beginning an annual holiday tradition. Ayres was also known for beautiful Christmas decorations, especially its elaborate window displays. Planned months in advance, these holiday windows had a different theme each year. The store expanded its holiday area to include toy displays and a Santa's workshop. After World War II, Ayres provided telephone visits with Santa and live television broadcasts. From 1958 through 1961, the Santa Claus Express, a miniature electric train, gave children rides through the store's Christmas display. Beginning in the 1940s, the downtown Indianapolis store also provided visits with a costumed Easter Bunny. In 1957, a group of live barnyard animals joined the annual Easter celebration.

The Ayres Economy Basement concept dates back to the opening of its Indianapolis flagship store in 1905. The Economy Basement, later known as the Downstairs Store and Budget Store, operated differently from those of other retail department stores. The Ayres basement store did not offer cheaply made, inferior goods. Instead, it sold lower-priced items of good quality that served as an entry point for less-affluent customers until they could afford full-priced goods on the upper floors. It also served as a training ground for Ayres managers. By the 1960s, the Budget Store had declined and was eclipsed by Ayr-Way, the Ayres discount subsidiary, and changes in shopping trends and pricing. The Budget Store concept was eliminated in the mid-1980s.

The L.S. Ayres Annex Warehouse, an Italianate-style brick building on Maryland Street, south of the flagship store, was originally called Elliott's Block. Built in 1875 for Calvin A. Elliott, a wholesale liquor merchant, the warehouse was added to the National Register of Historic Places in 1973.

=== Branches ===
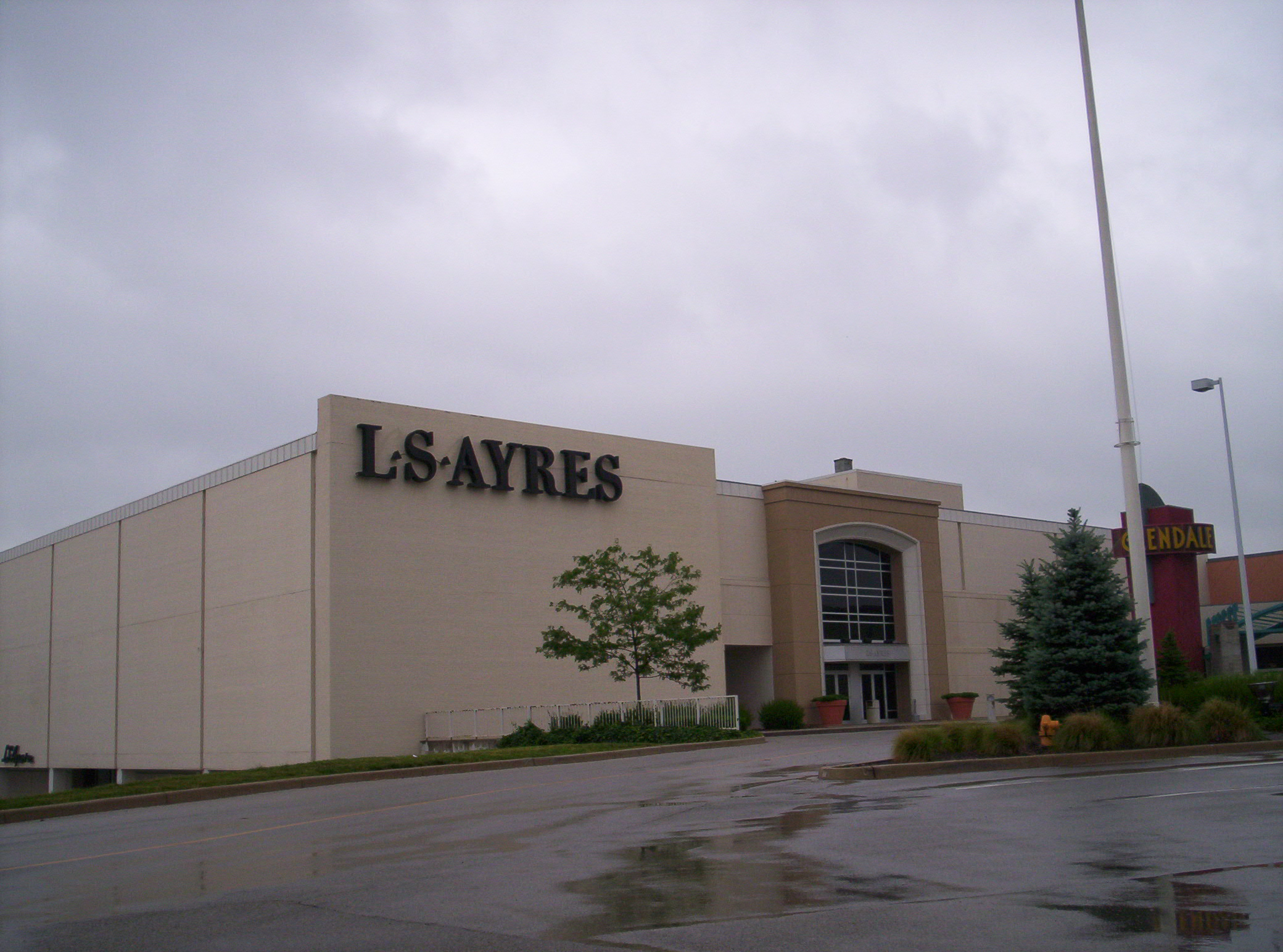
Former L. S. Ayres store at Glendale Shopping Center in Indianapolis

In May 1958, the first Ayres branch stores opened in Market Square Shopping Center in Lafayette, Indiana. In August 1958, Ayres opened another branch in the new Glendale Shopping Center at Sixty-second Street and Keystone Avenue on Indianapolis's north side in a joint venture between Ayres and Landau and Perlman, a Chicago developer. Additional branches were opened in Indianapolis and other Indiana markets in the 1960s and 1970s. These included the Greenwood Shopping Center (1965) in Greenwood and Ayres Glenbrook (1966) in Fort Wayne. After Ayres was acquired by Associated Dry Goods, the company opened additional Ayres stores in Indiana shopping malls: Lafayette Square Mall (1973) and Washington Square (1975) in Indianapolis, Scottsdale (1971) in South Bend, Muncie Mall (1977), Southlake (1978) in Merrillville, University Park Mall (1979) in Mishawaka, and College Mall (1982) in Bloomington.

=== Specialty shops ===
From 1919 until the early 1930s, Ayres operated two specialty shops during the tourist season at the French Lick Springs Hotel, a resort and spa in southern Indiana. The shops offered gifts, accessories, lingerie, and sportswear. In August 1955, Ayres opened the Boulevard Shop, a boutique in Indianapolis's Marott Hotel. The gift shop moved to a new location in the Stouffer Hotel on Meridian Street in Indianapolis in 1967 and remained there until it closed in the 1980s

In 1968, Ayres opened small specialty fashion shops, the Sycamore Shop and Cygnet. The Sycamore Shop catered to young adults and featured traditional clothing and accessories for men and women. The Cygnet Shops were modern fashion stores for young women. The first Sycamore Shop opened in Lafayette Square shopping center in Indianapolis; the first Cygnet Shop opened in Terre Haute, Indiana. By 1971, about a dozen of these shops were operating in suburban malls in Indiana, Ohio, and Kentucky. While the Cygnet Shops closed in 1975, the Sycamore Shops continued to expand, even after The May Department Stores Company acquired Ayres and its parent company, Associated Dry Goods, in 1986. Three Ayres executives purchased the Sycamore Shops from the May company and continued to operate the specialty chain. By 1990, there were 160 Sycamore Shops operating in five states. Sycamore Shops later filed for bankruptcy and forced to liquidate in late 1995 and early 1996.

=== Subsidiaries ===
Around 1914 the Ayres family established Murray Investments, a holding company that owned the store's real estate, which was leased back to Ayres. The subsidiary also provided for future expansions with the acquisition of additional land in Anderson, Indianapolis, South Bend, and Evansville, Indiana. Owned by the Ayres family, Murray Investments merged with L. S. Ayres Company in the late 1960s and provided the company with approximately $3.6 million in equity capital. The merger also increased Ayres family ownership of the company to 67 percent.

In September 1954 Ayres opened a new wholly owned subsidiary called the Murray Showrooms, which was open only to the interior decorator trade. The Indianapolis showroom, located at 31 West Thirteenth Street, operated like the Chicago Merchandise Mart and was the only one of its kind in Indiana. In 1960, Ayres opened a second location, in the Cincinnati suburb of Kenwood, Ohio, but it underperformed and was closed in 1965. The Indianapolis store survived until the late 1970s and was liquidated in 1982 after the showroom's roof collapsed.

In 1958, Ayres acquired The John Bressmer Company, located in Springfield, Illinois, and continued to operate the store under the Bressmer name. The modern, six-story downtown store was known for its quality fashions and customer service and became a training ground for Ayres managers. William P. Arnold, who joined Ayres in 1947, became Bressmer's president and moved on to become president and CEO of J. W. Robinson's and president, CEO, and board chairman of Associated Dry Goods. P. Gerald Mills, an Ayres buyer, moved to Bressmer's and later became president of Dayton's, president of the J. L. Hudson Company, and the president of the Dayton-Hudson Corporation. David P. Williams III, who also spent time at Bressmer's, became president of Associated Dry Goods. In 1972, Bressmer's was sold to Associated Dry Goods and became a branch of Stix, Baer and Fuller, an Associated Dry Goods subsidiary. In 1980, the downtown Springfield store closed after a new Stix, Baer and Fuller branch opened on the city's south side.

In 1969, Ayres acquired two department store divisions from City Stores: Kaufman-Straus, based in Louisville, Kentucky, and the Wolf & Dessauer Company, with two stores in Fort Wayne, Indiana. These stores were later converted to Ayres locations.

=== Ayr-Way ===
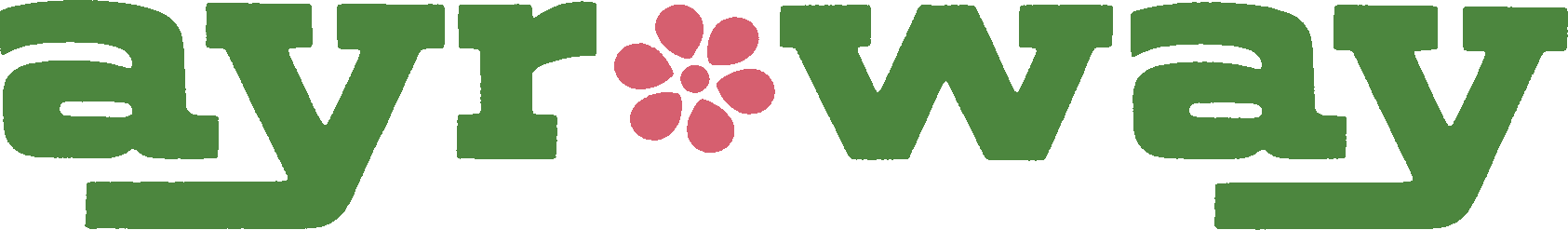
Ayr-Way logo

Ayres developed a discount store format called Ayr-Way in 1961 and opened its first Ayr-Way store at Thirty-eighth Street and Pendleton Pike in Indianapolis on October 13, 1961. This subsidiary was one of the first discount store divisions launched by a traditional department store. The Indianapolis Ayr-Way store opened prior to the first Kmart, which opened in Garden City, Michigan, in March 1962, and the first Target store, which opened in May 1962. Ayres also opened Ayr-Way stores in other cities.

Ayres encountered several challenges in establishing and operating the new discount store concept. First, Ayres needed to define a clear brand identity for the new subsidiary and its relationship to the L. S. Ayres store brand. Second, errors in selection of store locations posed challenges. Ayres built discount stores in areas of economic decline or in locations that were not yet sufficiently developed. Finally, Ayres's efforts to establish supermarkets adjacent to its discount stores proved unsuccessful. In fiscal year 1970, two years after their initial introduction, the Ayr-Way food stores, leased and operated by Scot-Lad Foods of Chicago, caused Ayres an after-tax loss of $320,000 (~$2.04 million in 2025). Ayres sold its food stores to Scot-Lad Foods in 1970 and concentrated on Ayr-Way's general merchandise.

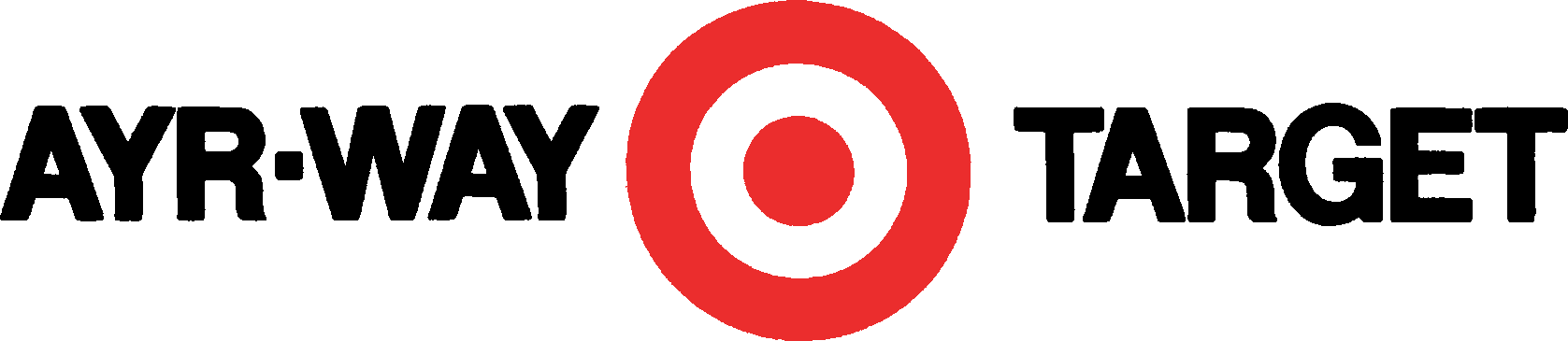
Ayr-Way Target transition logo

After Associated Dry Goods bought Ayres in 1972, the U.S. Federal Trade Commission objected to the merger because of the anticompetitive effects of its stores in Louisville and Lexington, Kentucky, and in Evansville, Indiana, where Ayr-Way and Stewarts Dry Goods stores were located. There were also two Ayres department stores in Louisville, along with one each in Danville, Illinois, and Champaign, Illinois. Under antitrust pressure from the Federal Trade Commission, Associated Dry Goods sold its Ayr-Way discount subsidiary to the private investment banking firm Stephens Inc. for $19.9 million in 1976 and closed the deal in early 1977. In 1980, the Ayr-Way chain, consisting of 40 stores and one distribution center, was acquired by the Dayton Hudson Corporation (now Target Corporation). The stores were remodeled and reopened as Target stores in 1981.

== Corporate affairs ==
In 1872, Lyman Ayres acquired controlling interest the Indianapolis dry-goods business owned by N. R. Smith and Company with an initial investment of $40,000 (~$957,180 in 2025) in sight drafts and notes. In 1874, Ayres bought out Smith's interest in the store and became its sole owner in 1895 after James G. Thomas, who owned a 25 percent stake in the store, retired from the company.

L. S. Ayres and Company was incorporated in 1896 with $200,000 (~$6.65 million in 2025) in capital. After Lyman's death in 1896, his son, Frederick M. (Fred) Ayres, was elected company president. Lyman's widow, Maria H. Ayres, became secretary-treasurer and his son-in-law, William B. Wheelock, became vice president The company remained a family-owned business, with the exception of two Ayres employee shareholders, until the company's initial public offering in the early 1950s. During the 1940s the board was expanded from five to include as many as nine members who represented the interests of the store, the general public, and the Ayres family. In the 1960s and early 1970s, Ayres expanded its board of directors to include outside business leaders and additional Ayres executives.

=== Leadership ===
- Lyman S. Ayres was founder and head of the company from 1872 to 1896.
- Frederick M. (Fred) Ayres, Lyman's son, served as company president from 1896 to 1940.
- Theodore B. (Ted) Griffith, Lyman's son-in-law, was the company's president from 1940 to 1954. Griffith also served as board chairman board from 1954 to 1959 and as an honorary director until his death in 1972.
- Lyman S. Ayres II, the eldest son of Fred Ayres, became a board member in 1940 and served as the company's president from 1954 to 1962. Ayres retired in 1962 to become the board's chairman, a position he held until 1973, when he was named honorary chairman.
- James A. Gloin became company president in 1962, the first nonfamily member to do so, and retired in 1965. He also became an Ayres board member.
- Daniel F. Evans became president in 1966. Evans was named chairman of Ayres in 1974, in addition to his roles as president and CEO.
- P. Gerald Mills became the Ayres president in 1974 and its CEO in 1975. Four years later Mills joined the Dayton-Hudson Corporation, where he became its president, and went on to become chairman of Jacobson's.
- David P. Williams III returned to lead Ayres as president and CEO in 1978 after serving as president of J. W. Robinson's, an Associated Dry Goods division in Florida. Williams left Ayres in 1982 and later become president of Associated Dry Goods.
- John L. Hoerner became Ayres president and CEO in 1982. He was the first non-family member to become an Ayres CEO.
- After The May Department Store Company acquired Ayres in 1986, a number of men served as president and CEO of Ayres, including Robert L. Mettler and Robert Friedman.

=== Stock ===
The company's initial public offering was made in the mid-1950s, when Ayres issued 52,250 shares of stock. This offering raised approximately $1 million in capital while the Ayres family retained 85 percent ownership.

=== Sales ===
After its initial stock offering in the 1950s, the company's profits grew, with earnings over $47 million in 1956, a company record up to that time. In 1957, profits set another record, more than $50 million in sales, with $1.2 million in net earnings, or $3.09 per common share. In fiscal year 1966, Ayres had sales of $106.3 million, with net income of $3.1 million, or $2.51 per share. On 31 July 1971, after years of annual profits, Ayres reported a quarterly loss of $404,000.

In the 1980s, after becoming part of Associated Dry Goods, Ayres added new locations, remodeled out-of-date stores, and was a profitable subsidiary. In 1985, the Ayres Glendale branch in Indianapolis ranked second among the 438 Associated Dry Goods stores in profitability. Only the Lord & Taylor flagship store in New York City, another Associated Dry Goods subsidiary, ranked higher. In 1985, Ayres stores enjoyed at least a 60 percent market share in most of the cities where it operated its stores. However, Ayres stores, with sales of $103 per square foot, lagged behind other May Company subsidiaries.

=== Diversity ===
In 1971, the ratio of Ayres minority employees to its total employees was reported at around 9 percent. Most of the company's minority employees worked at the downtown stores in Indianapolis and Fort Wayne, Indiana, and Louisville, Kentucky. Indianapolis had the highest percentage of minority employees at 17 percent.

Flora Krauch, the company's first woman executive, arrived at Ayres in 1909 as a buyer and established the store's successful children's department. Beverly Rice became the store's first female vice president in 1969 as a merchandise manager for the Cygnet Shops and women's better apparel. Rice was promoted to vice president and general merchandise manager in 1976 and retired from Ayres in 1983. In 1972, Ayres named Marlene Druien as the first woman store manager. Druien managed the Ayres Dixie Manor store in Louisville, Kentucky. Other women store managers included Florence Elias, a longtime Ayres employee who managed several Ayres branch stores, and Mary Alice Fogarty, who was named manager of the Ayres branch in Lafayette, Indiana, in 1974 and retired from Ayres in 1979.

=== Slogans ===
- "A Gift from Ayres Means More"—a familiar Ayres slogan that first appeared in the company's 1922 Christmas catalogs.
- "That Ayres Look"—a long-time slogan developed by Ayres merchandise manager J. Park Wood and publicity director Sidney Sullivan. The first national "That Ayres Look" appeared in Vogue magazine in 1936. The slogan continued to be used in a series of ads that promoted Ayres's image as a fashion leader for nearly fifty years. The ads featured fashions from designers such as Bill Blass, Christian Dior, Hattie Carnegie, and Norman Norell, among others. "That Ayres Look" was also the title of an Indiana Historical Society temporary exhibit about the history of the department store that ran from March 14, 2015, through August 6, 2016, at the Eugene and Marilyn Glick Indiana History Center in Indianapolis.

== See also ==
- List of department stores converted to Macy's
