= Ruth Lilly =

American philanthropist (1915–2009)

- Born: August 2, 1915; Indianapolis, Indiana, U.S.
- Died: December 30, 2009 (aged 94); Indianapolis, Indiana, U.S.
- Resting place: Crown Hill Cemetery (Indianapolis)
- Occupation: Philanthropist
- Board member of: Indianapolis Museum of Art
- Spouse: Guernsey van Riper Jr. (m. 1941; div. 1981)
- Parent(s): Josiah K. Lilly Jr. and Ruth (Brinkmeyer) Lilly
- Relatives: Eli Lilly (great grandfather); Josiah K. Lilly Sr. (grandfather); Eli Jr. (uncle)

Ruth Lilly (August 2, 1915 – December 30, 2009) was an American philanthropist, the last surviving great-grandchild of Eli Lilly, founder of the Eli Lilly and Company pharmaceutical firm, and heir to the Lilly family fortune. A lifelong resident of Indianapolis, Indiana, Ruth Lilly is estimated to have given away nearly $800 million of her inheritance during her lifetime, mostly in support of the arts, education, health, and environmental causes in Indianapolis and in Indiana.

Lilly made major direct donations to organizations in addition to gifts made through the Lilly Endowment, her family's private foundation, and in conjunction with the Ruth Lilly Philanthropic Foundation, the charitable organization established in her name in 2002. Both of these foundations continue Lilly's legacy of charitable support. Lilly's major gifts include those to the Chicago-based Poetry Foundation, Americans for the Arts in Washington, D.C., and Indiana University, especially its programs and buildings on the Indiana University–Purdue University Indianapolis campus.

== Early life and family ==
Ruth Lilly, the daughter of Ruth (née Brinkmeyer) and Josiah K. Lilly Jr., was born on August 2, 1915, in Indianapolis, Indiana. She was elder of their two children.

Her great-grandfather, Colonel Eli Lilly, founded Eli Lilly and Company in 1876. Her grandfather, Josiah K. Lilly Sr., succeeded Colonel Lilly as president of the pharmaceutical company in 1898 and became chairman of the board in 1932. Her father, Josiah K. Lilly Jr., joined the family firm in 1914 and served as its president (1948–53) and chairman of the board (1953–66). Her brother, J. K. (Joe) III, joined the family business in 1939, but resigned from the firm in 1948 and did not succeed his father as president.

Ruth became the last surviving great-grandchild of Colonel Lilly in 1995 on the death of her brother and heiress to the Lilly family's pharmaceutical fortune. Lilly's cousin, Evelyn Lilly Lutz, the only surviving child of Evelyn (Fortune) and Eli Lilly Jr., died in 1970.

Ruth and her brother grew up in Indianapolis, where she remained a lifelong resident. She graduated from Indianapolis's Tudor Hall School, a private school for girls, in 1933. She also attended Herron School of Art in Indianapolis. In December 1932, while Lilly was a teen, her parents purchased a French chateau-style home that became known as Oldfields. Lilly and her brother donated Oldfields and its landscaped grounds to the Art Association of Indianapolis in 1967.

In 1941 Lilly married Guernsey van Riper Jr., an author and the son of an Indianapolis advertising executive. They divorced in 1981 and had no children. Lilly lived a life of quiet seclusion. News sources, including the Indianapolis Star, reported that Lilly suffered from depression for much of her life. It was also reported that when Lilly was in her early seventies her health improved after she began taking Prozac, an antidepressant her family's pharmaceutical firm brought to market in 1988.

== Philanthropist ==
During her lifetime it is estimated that Lilly donated more than $800 million, an estimated $10 million annually, to charitable causes and arts organizations. Most of the recipients of her gifts were based in Indiana and her hometown of Indianapolis. Lilly's philanthropy fell into four major areas of interest: education, literature and the arts, disease prevention and suppression, and health education and health care. Rather than focusing on a specific area, she gave directly to a variety of causes, although she had a particular interest in poetry.

In 2002 alone, when Lilly's estate was valued at more than $1 billion, she donated "nearly $500 million to charitable and arts-related groups." The donations included an unexpected pledge valued at $100 million, mostly in Eli Lilly and Company stock, to Chicago-based Poetry magazine in November 2002. At the time of Lilly's headline-making donation, the monthly publication had a circulation of approximately 12,000 and its non-profit publisher, the Modern Poetry Association, had a four-person staff and an annual budget of less than $700,000. Soon afterwards the association was renamed the Poetry Foundation. The same year that Lilly made the major donation to Poetry magazine, she also pledged two other large gifts. One valued at $120 million was made to Americans for the Arts, a Washington, D.C.–based advocacy group. Lilly also made a gift valued at $150 million to the Lilly Endowment, Inc., the Lilly family's charitable foundation.

Poetry had been one of Lilly's long time interests. She enjoyed reading poetry and had written it since the mid-1930s. Although Lilly had submitted her poems to Poetry magazine for years, they were never accepted for publication. However, the rejections did not deter her support of the magazine and its publisher. Lilly had made previous donations to the magazine before her major donation in 2002. The Poetry Foundation's Ruth Lilly Poetry Prize of $100,000 has been awarded annually since 1986 to honor a living U.S. poet whose lifetime accomplishments warrant extraordinary recognition. In addition, her donations have endowed annual fellowships to young poets since 1989. The awards have expanded from a single fellowship (until 1995) to two fellowships (1996 to 2007) and five in 2008. The Ruth Lilly Poetry Fellowship was renamed the Ruth Lilly and Dorothy Sargent Rosenberg Poetry Fellowships after receipt of a gift from the Dorothy Sargent Rosenberg Memorial fund in 2013. The fellowships are open to all U.S. poets between the age of twenty-one and thirty-one. The amount of the individual fellowships has increased from $15,000 to $25,800.

Over the years Lilly made donations to numerous colleges and universities, most of them located in Indiana, including Indiana University, DePauw University, Butler University, and Wabash College, among others. Some of these donations were for specific purposes. For example, Lilly provided funding to Anderson University for a campus wellness center and to Franklin College for a leadership center.

Numerous Indianapolis charities were also recipients of her generosity, especially those related to health care. These included Indiana University Health Methodist Hospital, Riley Hospital for Children, and Saint Vincent Indianapolis Hospital, as well as the Brain Injury Association of Indiana. The Ruth Lilly Center for Health Education in Indianapolis was funded with her gift in 1987. Lilly was also a patron of various Indianapolis arts organizations, including the Indianapolis Art Center, Indianapolis Symphony Orchestra, Indiana Repertory Theatre, and the city's ballet and opera organizations, among others. She was a member of the Indianapolis Museum of Art's board of trustees.

== Later years ==
In her final years, Lilly's health began to decline and physical limitations confined her to a wheelchair. In 2006 the court established a niece and nephew as her legal guardians with responsibility for making decisions concerning her estate, which was estimated at more than $1 billion at that time.

Lilly spent the last years of her life at Twin Oaks, an Indianapolis home that was once owned by Isabel and Lyman S. Ayres II, the grandson of Lyman S. Ayres, founder of the L. S. Ayres and Company department stores. Lilly's parents purchased the Ayres's Colonial Revival-style home on Kessler Boulevard in 1955 and renovated it in a European style. In 1963 the Lilly family purchased adjoining property to expand the estate to 22 acres (8.9 hectares). Although Lilly's parents never made Twin Oaks their home, it served as Ruth's residence until her death in 2009 and as a gathering place for the family.

== Death and legacy ==
Lilly died of heart failure on December 30, 2009. A service in celebration of her life was held on January 11, 2010, at Indianapolis's Christ Church Cathedral, where she had been a member. Her remains are interred at Crown Hill Cemetery in Indianapolis. Lilly was survived by six nieces and nephews and their descendants.

The Ruth Lilly Philanthropic Foundation, established in 2002 to continue her legacy of philanthropy, received additional funding from her estate, as did the Lilly Endowment, Inc., the Lilly family's charitable foundation. News reports at the time of her death in 2009 estimated the value of the additional funding provided her charitable foundation would range from $125 million to $150 million. Her donation to the Lilly Endowment was funded by two trusts, one of them valued at an estimated at $95 million as of June 30, 2008. The other trust, valued at $200 million in 2008, benefits the Indianapolis Museum of Art, which is located on the grounds of Oldfields, her family's former estate. The IMA manages Oldfields, which is open to the public, as a part of the art museum.

Lilly's special interest in poetry continues through the direct donation she made to the Poetry Foundation. Her funding sponsors an annual poetry prize and fellowships to aspiring poets, as well as new programs and initiative the Poetry Foundation established since its receipt of her bequest.

Lilly's legacy also continues through the major gifts and grants she provided to colleges and universities. Indiana University received additional gifts from Lilly's estate and her related philanthropic foundations. In April 2011 IU received two generous gifts valued at an estimated $10.7 million from her estate. Approximately $8 million was donated to its Center on Philanthropy and approximately $2.7 million to the Herron School of Art and Design. IU's Center on Philanthropy, which is located on the IUPUI campus, was renamed the Lilly Family School of Philanthropy in 2013, following receipt of funding from the Lilly Endowment in 2012. Herron planned to use the Lilly funding it received to expand its graduate-degree offerings and other art programs, and to complete Eskenazi Hall, which houses the art and design school on the IUPUI campus. Another of Lilly's contributions to IU was an endowed chair of poetry.

Several other Indiana colleges and universities received gifts from Lilly, including Anderson University, Butler University, DePauw University, Franklin College, Hanover College, Marian University, the University of Indianapolis, and Wabash College, among others. She also made donations to Duke University in North Carolina and Tufts University in Massachusetts. Lilly has also been a benefactor to several Indianapolis-area schools, including Brebeuf Jesuit Preparatory School, Cathedral High School, Lutheran High School, The Orchard School, and Park Tudor School.

Lilly's philanthropic legacy also reflects her interests in health and environmental issues. Her donations have supported the work of several Indianapolis-area hospitals, including IU Health Methodist Hospital, Riley Hospital for Children, and Saint Vincent Indianapolis Hospital. Lilly donated $1 million to the Crossroads Rehabilitation Center in Indianapolis for its Assistive Technology Center. She also supported the Brain Injury Association of Indiana, The Nature Conservancy, the Hoosier Environment Council, the Indianapolis Chapter of the American Red Cross, The Salvation Army, the United Way of Central Indiana, and various children's and family support agencies in Indiana and in the Indianapolis area. In 2014 the Ruth Lilly Health Education Center announced that it would merge into Marian University's School of Education and Exercise Science in early 2015 to remain financially sustainable.

Many arts-related organizations have been recipients of her support, especially the Americans for the Arts, to whom she pledged a gift valued at $120 million in 2002. Most of the other arts groups have been located in Indiana and in Indianapolis: the Indianapolis Art Center, Indiana Symphony Orchestra, Indianapolis's ballet and opera troupes, the Indiana Repertory Theatre, Young Audiences of Indiana, WFYI Public Broadcasting, Conner Prairie, the Eiteljorg Museum of American Indians and Western Art, and the Indianapolis Zoo. Lilly was also contributor to the Heritage Museums and Gardens in Sandwich, Massachusetts, which her brother established as a tribute to their father. Twin Oaks, Lilly's Indianapolis home, is privately owned and under lease to the Indiana Historical Society, who manages the site and uses it as a hospitality center. IHS's president and CEO serves as resident curator.

== Honors and tributes ==
- Lilly was awarded a Doctor of Humane Letters degree from Wabash College in 1991, from Franklin College in 2003, and from Marian University and Indiana University in 2004.
- Lilly was the recipient of the 1998 U.S. Philanthropist of the Year award from the national Easter Seals society.
- The Poetry Foundation's annual Ruth Lilly Poetry Prize and the Ruth Lilly and Dorothy Sargent Rosenberg Poetry Fellowships are awarded annually.
- Following receipt of Lilly's gift of an estimated $10.7 million, which was announced in 2011, IUPUI's Center on Philanthropy (later renamed the IU Lilly Family School of Philanthropy) established the Ruth Lilly Professorship Program in her honor. The program will provide matching funds to inspire and encourage other donors to create seven to ten endowed faculty chairs.
- Numerous organizations have buildings and special facilities that bear her name:
  - The Indiana University's Ruth Lilly Law Library is housed in the Robert H. McKinney School of Law building on the IUPUI campus.
  - The Indiana University's Medical Library, initially established in 1908, has been renamed the Ruth Lilly Medical Library; it is located on the IU Medical Center campus in Indianapolis.
  - In recognition of Lilly's estimated $2.7 million gift to IUPUI's Herron School of Art and Design in 2011, the school named its administrative offices in Eskenazi Hall the Ruth Lilly Dean's Suite in her honor.
  - IUPUI's Ruth Lilly Special Collections and Archives, which is housed in the University Library on the Indianapolis campus, includes the University Archives, the Philanthropy Archives, the Joseph and Matthew Payton Philanthropic Studies Library, German-American collections, as well as general and digital resources.
  - The Ruth Lilly Performance Hall, located in the University of Indianapolis's Christel DeHaan Fine Arts Center, is named in Lilly's honor.
  - The Indianapolis Art Center is the home of the Ruth Lilly Library.
  - The Ruth Lilly Hospice of Clarion is located in Indianapolis.
  - The Ruth Lilly Visitors Pavilion opened in 2010 at the Indianapolis Museum of Art's Virginia B. Fairbanks Art & Nature Park.
  - The Ruth Lilly YMCA Outdoor Center, which offers environmental education programming for school groups, is located at the Flat Rock River YMCA Camp in St. Paul, Indiana.

== Sources ==
- "At The Vanguard of Philanthropic Education". Indiana University.
- Banes, T. J. (June 14, 2014). "Ruth Lilly's Home Opens to Public for First Time". Indianapolis Star.
- Berman, Eric (October 21, 2014). "Ruth Lilly Health Education Center to Close After 25 Years: Center's outreach programs will continue and expand under management of Marian University". 93.1 WIBC. WIBC.
- Bodenhamer, David J., and Robert G. Barrows, eds. (1994). The Encyclopedia of Indianapolis. Bloomington and Indianapolis: Indiana University Press. p. 1076. ISBN 0-253-31222-1.
- Brooks, Bradley (Spring 2003). "Oldfields: An American Country Estate". Traces of Indiana and Midwestern History. 15 (2). Indianapolis: Indiana Historical Society: 34, 37.
- Decker, Jenny (December 31, 2009). "Eli Lilly heiress Ruth Lilly suffered from depression".
- "Department of Music: Music Facilities". University of Indianapolis.
- "Facts About the Medical Library". Indiana University.
- Harvey, Roger (August 7, 2006). "Ruth Lilly's Relatives Take Over Guardianship". WTHR Eyewitness News.
- Hempel, Jessi (February 16, 2004). "A Philanthropist of the Old School". Bloomberg.
- "Hours and Building Access". Indiana University.
- IBJ Staff (April 6, 2011). "Ruth Lilly estate donates $10.7M to Indiana University". Indianapolis Business Journal.
- "In Memoriam: Ruth Lilly, 1915–2009". Poetry Foundation. December 31, 2009.
- "Indiana University Receives $10.7 Million From Ruth Lilly's Estate". Philanthropy News Digest. April 10, 2011.
- King, Robert; Will Higgins (December 31, 2009). "Indianapolis philanthropist Ruth Lilly dies at age 94". Indianapolis Star. Archived from the original on January 17, 2010.
- Madison, James H. (1989). Eli Lilly: A Life, 1885–1977. Indianapolis: Indiana Historical Society. pp. 118–19. ISBN 0-87195-047-2.
- McLaughlin, Kathleen (January 9, 2010). "Death of Heiress Ruth Lilly Unleashes More Philanthropy". Indianapolis Business Journal. Indianapolis, Indiana.
- Meyers Sharp, Jo Ellen (May 29, 2014). "Twin Oaks Tour Will Be Gardener's Delight". Indianapolis Star.
- "Moving Philanthropy Forward". Indiana University.
- "Programs: Summer Resident Camp". Flat Rock River YMCA Camp.
- "Ruth Lilly and Dorothy Sargent Rosenberg Poetry Fellowships". Poetry Foundation.
- "Ruth Lilly Dies at 94; Philanthropist and Heir to Eli Lilly Fortune". Los Angeles Times. January 1, 2010. Archived from the original on May 9, 2010.
- "Ruth Lilly Hospice of Clarian". AgingCare, LLC.
- "Ruth Lilly Library–Indianapolis Arts Center". Indianapolis Arts Center.
- "Ruth Lilly Obituary". Indianapolis Star. January 3, 2010.
- "Ruth Lilly Special Collections and Archives". Indiana University–Purdue University Indianapolis.
- "Tribute". Tributes.com.
- Weber, Bruce (December 31, 2009). "Ruth Lilly, Drug Heiress and Poetry Patron, Dies at 94". New York Times.
