= Josiah K. Lilly Jr. =

American businessman and industrialist

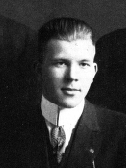
- Lilly in 1913
- Born: September 25, 1893; Indianapolis, Indiana, U.S.
- Died: May 5, 1966 (aged 72); Crown Hill Cemetery and Arboretum
- Resting place: Crown Hill Cemetery and Arboretum Sec 14, Lot 9; 39.8198346°N 86.1762405°W
- Education: University of Michigan
- Occupation: Industrialist
- Known for: Pharmaceuticals; Philanthropy
- Title: President, Eli Lilly and Company
- Term: 1948–1953
- Predecessor: Eli Lilly Jr.
- Successor: Eugene N. Beesley
- Political party: Republican
- Board member of: Lilly Endowment
- Spouse: Ruth Brinkmeyer (m. 1954; died 1965)
- Children: Ruth (1915–2009); Josiah Kirby Lilly III (1916–1995)
- Parent(s): Josiah K. Lilly Sr. and Lilly Ridgely Lilly
- Relatives: Eli Lilly and Emily Lemen Lilly (grandparents); Eli Lilly Jr. (brother)

Signature from June 1935
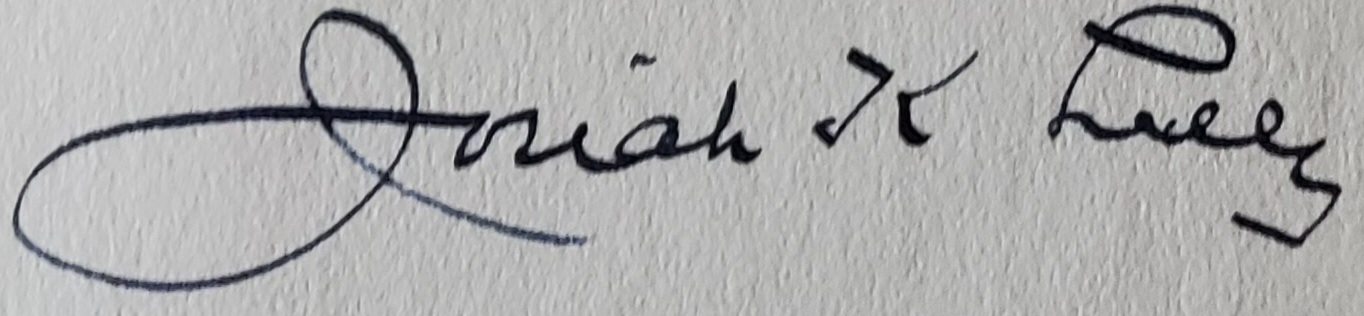

Josiah Kirby "Joe" Lilly Jr. (September 25, 1893 – May 5, 1966) was a businessman and industrialist who served as president (1948 –53) and chairman of the board (1953–66) of Eli Lilly and Company, the pharmaceutical firm his grandfather, Colonel Eli Lilly, founded in Indianapolis in 1876. Lilly, the younger son and namesake of Josiah K. Lilly Sr., graduated from the University of Michigan's School of Pharmacy in 1914 where he was a member of the Chi Psi Fraternity. He served in the United States Army in France during World War I.

At Eli Lilly and Company, where his primary focus was marketing and human resources, he served as vice president of marketing, executive vice president of the company, and president of Eli Lilly International Corporation, before succeeded his older brother, Eli Jr., as company president in 1948 and as chairman of the board in 1953.

During Lilly's five decades with the firm, it grew into one of the largest and most influential pharmaceutical corporations in the world, and the largest corporation in Indiana. Lilly helped improve the company's business processes to increase its efficiency, laid the groundwork for its personnel guidelines, and formed its sales research department. He was the last Lilly family member to serve as company president.

Lilly was also a philanthropist, as well as a collector. In 1937 Joe, his brother, and their father, founded the Lilly Endowment, which remains as one of the largest charitable foundations in the world. Lilly was also known for his significant collection of rare books and manuscripts, which he donated to Indiana University to form the core collection of the Lilly Library, located on the IU campus in Bloomington, Indiana. Oldfields, Lilly's estate home and grounds in Indianapolis, are part of the present-day Newfields. The Smithsonian Institution acquired Lilly's gold coin collection. Cape Cod's Heritage Museums and Gardens was established in his honor in Sandwich, Massachusetts, and holds some of Lilly's other collections.

== Early life and education ==
Josiah Kirby Lilly Jr., known as "Joe" among friends and family, was the younger son of Josiah K. Lilly Sr. and Lilly (née Ridgley) Lilly. He was born at the family's home on North Pennsylvania Street in Indianapolis, Indiana, on September 25, 1893. His only sibling, Eli Jr., was eight years older. Joe's mother suffered from pernicious anemia and died in 1934; his father died in 1948.

Lilly was the grandson of Colonel Eli Lilly, who founded Eli Lilly and Company, a pharmaceutical manufacturing business in Indianapolis in 1876. Joe's father was superintendent of the Lilly laboratory at the time of Joe's birth and succeeded Colonel Lilly as president of the company in 1898. Joe and Eli followed their father into the family business. Each son served as company president and chairman of the board, but Joe was the last family member to serve as its president.

Lilly attended the Holderness School in Holderness, New Hampshire, and graduated from The Hill School in Pottstown, Pennsylvania, in 1912. He continued his education with a two-year course at the University of Michigan College of Pharmacy, which he completed in 1914, and then returned to Indianapolis to join the family business.

== Career ==
=== Eli Lilly and Company ===
In November 1914, Lilly joined Eli Lilly and Company, where he became head of its newly formed Efficiency Division in 1916. He was responsible for the company's employee relations, payroll, and methods and standards departments. Following his enlistment in the U.S. Army during World War I, when he served in France as an officer in the medical supply service, Lilly returned to the family business in Indianapolis, where he spent the remainder of his career.

In the late 1920s Lilly and his brother, Eli, established a Planning Department and developed improvements to the company's hiring procedures, employee bonus incentives, working conditions, and efficiency efforts. While Eli served as president of the company from 1932 to 1948, Joe's main interests were sales and marketing. During this period the company's growth was significant: "sales increased from $13 million to $115 million, and the number of employees grew from 1,675 to 6,912." As part of a company reorganization in 1944, Joe became executive vice president, while continuing to maintain responsibilities for the company's marketing effort, including the sales research, marketing, and distribution functions.

The company's increasing size, the complexity of its business, and the resignation of Joe's son, Josiah III, in 1946, caused the company to consider a gradual leadership transition that would separate the company's ownership from its day-to-day management. Prior to his elevation to company president in 1948, Joe was president of Eli Lilly International Corporation. He remained at the helm until 1953 when Eugene Beesley succeeded him to become the first non-family member to serve as the company's president. Lilly was chairman of the board from 1953 until his death in 1966.

== Later years ==
Following his retirement as company president in 1953, Lilly devoted most of his time to various hobbies. He was known for his philanthropic activities, as well as his collections of rare books and manuscripts, gold coins, antique weaponry, stamps, works of art, and military miniatures.

== Philanthropy and collections ==
=== Lilly Endowment ===
In 1937 Lilly, his father, J. K., and his older brother, Eli, founded the Indianapolis-based Lilly Endowment Inc. Over the years Joe donated a total of $6 million in Eli Lilly and Company stock to the endowment and Eli contributed stock valued at $2.8 million; however, their father made the largest stock contribution, a total of $86.8 million. As the company's stock value increased, the Lilly Endowment became one of the largest private foundations in the United States. In addition to its other projects the Lilly Endowment funded some of Joe's special interests, such as Bibliography of American Literature, which published its first volume in 1955, and grants to the Lilly Library at IU Bloomington.

=== Rare book and manuscript collection ===
Lilly was a prolific rare book collector and a member of the Grolier Club. He acquired a First Folio of the works of William Shakespeare, a Gutenberg Bible, a double-elephant folio of John James Audubon's Birds of America, the first printing of the American Declaration of Independence (the Dunlap Broadside), and a first edition of Edgar Allan Poe's Tamerlane. He also acquired ninety-four titles on the "Grolier Hundred," a list of one hundred volumes that have been identified as important in the history of printed books. Lilly owned "thousands" of first editions of significant books of literature, history, and science. His collection was especially strong in American and British literary classics, as well as the history of science and medicine and Americana. The manuscript collections ranged from Robert Burns's "Auld Lang Syne" to the original manuscript of James M. Barrie's Peter Pan.

On November 26, 1954, in a letter written to Herman B Wells, president of Indiana University, Lilly described his intention to donate his entire general collection of sixty-nine titles to the university. IU announced the donation, which the New York Times estimated its worth at $5 million, on January 8, 1956. Lilly eventually donated to IU more than 20,000 books and 17,000 manuscripts, in addition to more than fifty oil paintings and 300 prints. The collection is housed in the Lilly Library building on IU's main campus in Bloomington, Indiana.

=== Lilly Library ===
In the late 1950s, Lilly provided the funding for construction of a new special collections library on the IU Bloomington campus. The Lilly Library, which is named in honor of the family, was dedicated on October 3, 1960. It houses the university's rare book and manuscript collections.

== Death and legacy ==
Lilly died at Oldfields, his home in Indianapolis, Indiana, on May 5, 1966. He is buried at Crown Hill Cemetery in Indianapolis.

Lilly's children, Ruth and Josiah III, were philanthropists like their father. His daughter donated an estimated $800 million during her lifetime to numerous charitable organizations and non-profit institutions, most of them in Indiana and in Indianapolis. His son contributed money to community projects in the Cape Cod area. He also founded the Heritage Museums and Gardens at Sandwich, Massachusetts, in his father's honor. Eli (Ted) Lilly II, Josiah III's son and Joe Jr.'s grandson, maintains a low profile in the Indianapolis area.

Lilly's main contributions during his fifty-year career at Eli Lilly and Company included helping to improve its business processes and increase efficiency, establishing the groundwork for its personnel guidelines, and forming a sales research department. According to Forbes magazine, it ranked as the 243rd largest public company in the world in 2016, with sales of $20 billion and a market value of $86 billion (USD). As of 2014 the Lilly Endowment, which he founded with his father and brother, ranked fifth on a list of the largest charitable foundations in total assets ($9.96 billion) and ranked twenty-first in total giving ($333.6 million).

Lilly's children donated Oldfields, the family's home and gardens, to the Arts Association of Indianapolis in 1967. The residence and its grounds are part of the present-day Indianapolis Museum of Art. The Indianapolis Department of Parks and Recreation acquired Lilly's Eagle Crest property from Purdue University in 1966 and established Eagle Creek Park and Nature Preserve, "the largest city-owned and -operated park and recreation area in the United States."

Lilly's rare book and manuscript collections became the core collections of the Lilly Library, a special collections library at IU Bloomington that is named in the family's honor. The Smithsonian Institution in Washington, D.C. acquired Lilly's gold coin collection. His military miniatures are part of the collections of Cape Cod's Heritage Museums and Gardens in Sandwich, Massachusetts; his nautical models are at Mystic Seaport, in Mystic, Connecticut.

== Personal life ==
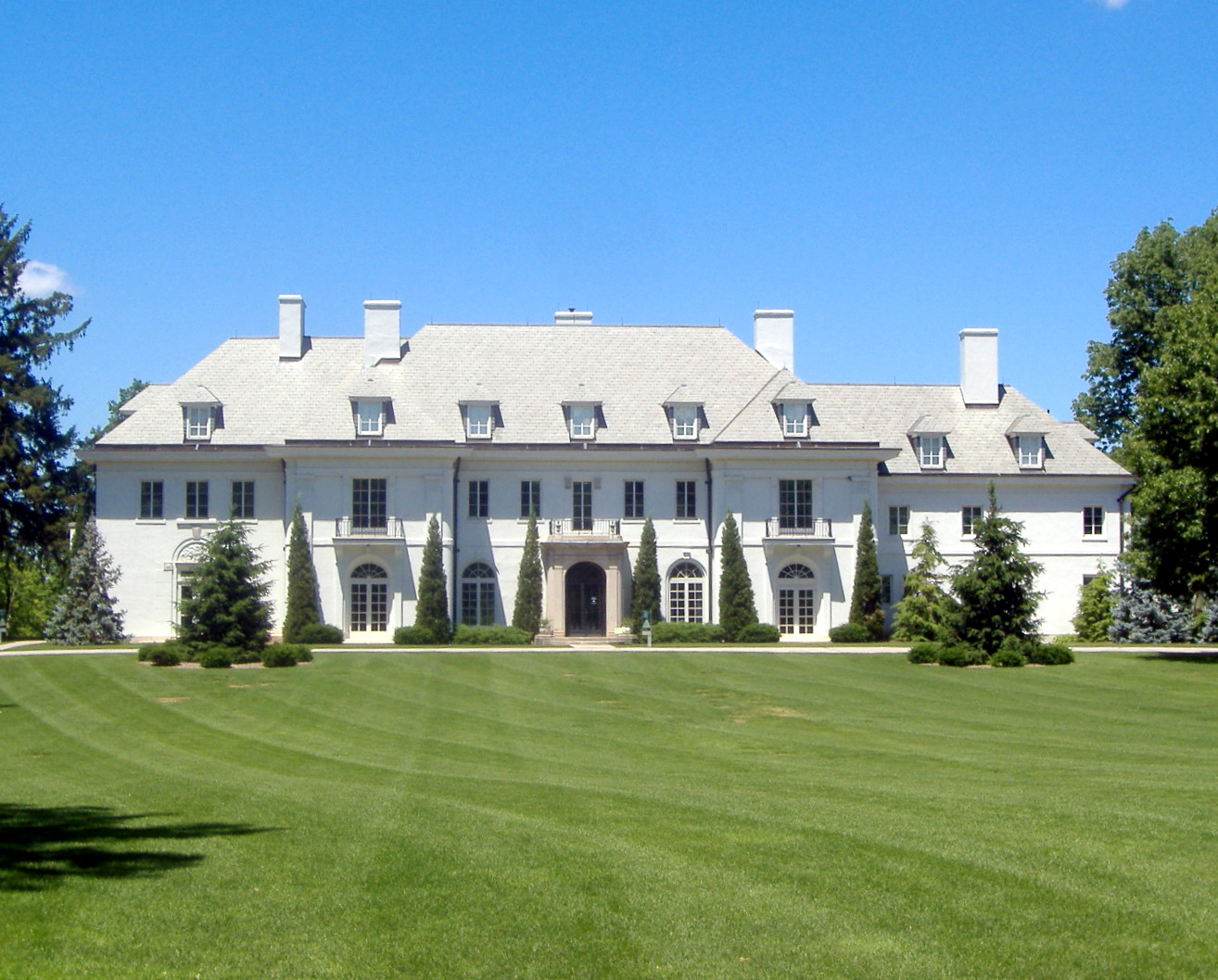
Oldfields, Lilly's former home in Indianapolis

Joe married Ruth Marie Brinkmeyer of Indianapolis on October 15, 1914. The couple had two children, Ruth (1915–2009) and Josiah (Joe) III (1916–1995). Lilly's daughter became a philanthropist. His son joined the family business in 1939 and became superintendent of its Kentucky Avenue plant after serving in the military during World War II; however, he resigned from the company in 1948 and did not succeed his father as president. In 1954, after briefly serving as secretary of the Lilly Endowment, Josiah III resigned and moved to New England.

In December 1932, Lilly purchased Oldfields, a French chateau-style home with landscaped gardens, from Hugh McKennan Landon, an Indianapolis businessman. Lewis Ketcham Davis designed the home, which was built circa 1909–13; Percival Gallagher, an associate of the Olmsted Brothers, designed its gardens. Lilly and his wife, Ruth, maintained the home as their primary residence. Oldfields and its landscaped grounds were donated to the Art Association of Indianapolis in 1967 and became a part the Indianapolis Museum of Art.

In 1934, Lilly began acquiring additional land along Eagle Creek in Marion County's Pike Township, northwest of downtown Indianapolis, to create Eagle Crest, a private retreat on 3,469 acres (1,404 hectares) of land. The secluded property included an operating farm and timberland, as well as a nature preserve. In 1936 Lilly moved his collection of rare books and manuscripts from his home to the library he had built on the property, which also included a lodge. In 1958, Lilly donated the property to Purdue University. The Indianapolis Department of Parks and Recreation acquired Eagle Crest from the university in 1966 to establish Eagle Creek Park and Nature Preserve.

In 1955, Lilly acquired the Indianapolis home of Lyman S. Ayres II, the grandson of Lyman S. Ayres, who founded the L. S. Ayres and Company department stores. Ayres had the Colonial-style home on Kessler Boulevard, West Drive, built in 1941. The Lilly family purchase adjoining property to expand the estate, known as Twin Oaks, to 22 acres (8.9 hectares). Lilly's daughter, Ruth, lived there until her death in 2009, and it remains privately owned. He also maintained a summer home, called Red Oaks, at Falmouth, Massachusetts.

== Sources ==
- Baines, T. J. (June 14, 2014). "Ruth Lilly's Home Opens to Public for First Time". The Indianapolis Star.
- Bodenhamer, David J., and Robert G. Barrows, eds. (1994). The Encyclopedia of Indianapolis. Bloomington and Indianapolis: Indiana University Press. ISBN 0-253-31222-1.
- Brooks, Bradley C. (2004). Oldfields. Indianapolis Museum of Art.
- Brooks, Bradley (Spring 2003). "Oldfields: An American Country Estate". Traces of Indiana and Midwestern History. 15 (2). Indianapolis: Indiana Historical Society: 34–39.
- Capshew, James H. (2012). Herman B Wells: The Promise of the American University. Bloomington and Indianapolis: Indiana University Press and Indiana Historical Society Press. p. 245. ISBN 9780253357205.
- "Eagle Creek Park History" (PDF). Indianapolis Department of Parks and Recreaction.
- "Foundation Stats". Foundation Center.
- Grolier, or, 'Tis sixty years since: A reconstruction of the exhibit of 100 books famous in English literature, originally held in New York, 1903, on the occasion of the club's visit to the Lilly Library, Indiana University, May 1, 1963. Bloomington, IN: Lilly Library (Indiana University Library, Bloomington). 1963.
- Ivcevich, Kelly A. "Lilly Endowment, Inc". Learning to Give.
- "J. K. Lilly Jr." in Silver, Joel (1994). Dictionary of Literary Biography. Vol. 141. Detroit: Gale. pp. 125–33.
- "Josiah K. Lilly of Drug Concern: Board Chairman Dies at 72–Active in Charities". New York Times. May 6, 1966.
- Lilly Jr.; Josiah Kirby; David Anton Randall (1966). Eighty-nine Good Novels of the Sea, The Ship, and The Sailor. Bloomington: Lilly Library, Indiana University. OCLC 160462.
- Madison, James H. (1989). Eli Lilly: A Life, 1885–1977. Indianapolis: Indiana Historical Society. ISBN 0-87195-047-2.
- "Online tour: Foyer". Lilly Library, Indiana University Bloomington. 6 December 2013.
- Rubin, Karen (July 20, 2016). "Going Places, Far & Near Heritage Museum & Gardens is World-Class Destination Attraction on Cape Cod". Travel Features Syndicate.
- Silver, Joel (1993). J.K. Lilly Jr., Bibliophile. Lilly Library publication. Vol. 52. Bloomington, Indiana: Lilly Library. ISBN 1879598132.
- Taylor Jr.; Robert M.; Errol Wayne Stevens; Mary Ann Ponder; Paul Brockman (1989). Indiana: A New Historical Guide. Indianapolis: Indiana Historical Society. p. 419. ISBN 0-87195-048-0.
- Weber, Bruce (December 31, 2009). "Ruth Lilly, Drug Heiress and Poetry Patron, Dies at 94". The New York Times.
- "World's Biggest Public Companies". Forbes. Archived from the original on April 23, 2011.

Preceded by Eli Lilly Jr.	President of the Eli Lilly and Company; 1948–1953	Succeeded by Eugene N. Beesley
