= Ruth Allison Lilly =

American art collector and philanthropist

Ruth Allison Lilly (1891–1973) was an art collector and philanthropist from Indianapolis, Indiana. Married to industrialist and philanthropist Eli Lilly for 45 years, she is noted for her many contributions to the arts and culture landscape of Indiana, particularly Indianapolis.

== Early life ==
Ruth Helen Allison was born on October 14, 1891, in Indianapolis. Her father, William D. Allison, was a manufacturer of medical office furniture. Her sister Lila eventually married Eli Lilly's father, J.K. Lilly Sr.

She joined Eli Lilly and Company in 1919 to work on the company's newsletter, The Lilly Balance. She was hired as secretary to the head of the personnel department in 1921 before becoming Eli Lilly's personal secretary shortly thereafter. Ruth Allison and Eli Lilly married in 1927.

== Philanthropy ==
Ruth and Eli Lilly were generous philanthropists, focusing their giving on organizations and causes in Indiana. Ruth was a member of the board of directors of the Lilly Endowment, the philanthropic foundation of the Lilly family. In addition to gifts given with her husband, Ruth made philanthropic contributions of her own, particularly to conservative and religious causes and to the Children's Museum of Indianapolis. She was a member of the board of trustees of the Children's Museum of Indianapolis, and the Ruth Allison Lilly Theater there is named for her. She was honored in 1941 for her contributions to the United China Relief Fund, receiving a signed certificate from Madame Chiang Kai-shek.

Ruth Lilly was instrumental in the restoration and furnishing of the William Conner house and the creation of Conner Prairie, receiving the Conservation Award from the Garden Club of America for her work. Eli and Ruth Lilly purchased the Conner House and surrounding land in 1934. In preparation for the restoration and furnishing, they traveled to Williamsburg, then in the early stages of its own historic preservation. Ruth conducted research on furnishings and decorative arts of the early 19th century at the Indiana State Library. While accompanying Eli on business trips, Ruth would visit antique shops searching for appropriate furnishings. In addition to their preservation work at Conner Prairie, they also purchased and restored the Kemper House in downtown Indianapolis.

A keen gardener and admirer of nature, she served on the advisory committee on conservation education of the Indiana Department of Natural Resources.

The Lillys were active members of the Episcopal Christ Church Cathedral in Indianapolis. Ruth Lilly organized and supervised the library there. An accomplished needlework artist, Ruth Lilly was a member of the needlepoint committee for the National Cathedral in Washington, D.C., and helped create hand-stitched kneelers for the cathedral in the 1950s.

Ruth Lilly was a founding trustee of the Indianapolis Museum of Art. She was also an art collector, assembling fine collections of timepieces and silver. Her timepiece collection spanned five centuries and included watches owned by Marie Antionette, Sara Bernhardt, and J.P. Morgan, and her silver collection included several pieces made by Paul Revere. Her collections of timepieces and silver were donated to the Indianapolis Museum of Art after her death. In 1973, an exhibition of Ruth Lilly's collection of watches and timepieces opened at the Indianapolis Museum of Art.

== Personal life ==
The Lillys frequently worked closely together on philanthropic and community projects. Of Ruth, Eli Lilly said, "In the many years of our marriage, I have almost never made an important decision without consulting her views. I consider her a remarkable woman with God-given talents for clear analysis, penetrating insights, and wise judgements." She was described as kind and friendly and, like her husband, rejected social pretense.

Ruth and Eli Lilly had no children. Eli Lilly had a daughter, Evelyn Lilly, from a previous marriage.

Ruth Allison Lilly died of cancer on 14 March 1973. She was 81 years old. She is buried in Crown Hill Cemetery.
