= Josiah K. Lilly Sr. =

American businessman

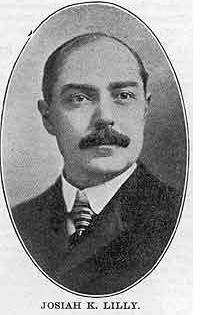
- Lilly, c. 1911
- Born: November 18, 1861; Greencastle, Indiana, U.S.
- Died: February 8, 1948 (aged 86); Indianapolis, Indiana, U.S.
- Resting place: Crown Hill Cemetery, Section 14, Lot 9; 39.8200063°N 86.1755753°W
- Education: Philadelphia College of Pharmacy
- Occupations: Pharmaceutical chemist, industrialist, philanthropist
- Title: President of Eli Lilly and Company
- Term: 1898–1932
- Political party: Republican
- Board member of: Lilly Endowment
- Spouses: Lilly Ridgley (m. 1882; died 1934) Lila Allison Humes (m. 1935)
- Children: Eli Jr.; Josiah Jr.
- Parent(s): Emily (Lemen) and Eli Lilly
- Relatives: Ruth Lilly (granddaughter)
- Awards: Remington Medal, 1942

Josiah Kirby Lilly Sr. (November 18, 1861 – February 8, 1948), nicknamed "J. K.", was an American businessman, pharmaceutical chemist, and philanthropist who served as president and chairman of the board of Eli Lilly and Company, the pharmaceutical firm founded by his father, Colonel Eli Lilly, in 1876. Josiah, the colonel's sole heir, began working for the company at age 14.

He graduated from Philadelphia College of Pharmacy and became superintendent of Lilly's laboratories in 1882. He succeeded his father as company president in 1898. Under his leadership, Eli Lilly and Company introduced standardized manufacturing processes, expanded its sales force, and increased research efforts to develop new drugs. The company grew into one of the largest and most influential pharmaceutical corporations in the world and the largest corporation in Indiana. Lilly's eldest son, Eli Jr., succeeded him as president in 1932. Lilly continued as chairman of the board until his death in 1948. His younger son, Josiah Jr. ("Joe"), succeeded Eli as company president in 1948.

Lilly also supported numerous charitable and civic organizations in Indianapolis and throughout Indiana. In 1937, Lilly and his two sons established the Lilly Endowment with Eli Lilly and Company stock valued at $280,000. The endowment later became one of the world's largest charitable foundations and continues the Lilly family's philanthropic legacy. Lilly also amassed a significant collection of composer Stephen Foster's music and memorabilia, which he donated to the University of Pittsburgh in 1937.

== Early life and education ==
Josiah Kirby Lilly, the only son and heir of Eli Lilly, a pharmacist, and Emily (née Lemen) Lilly, was born on November 18, 1861, in Greencastle, Indiana. Eli, who enlisted in the Union Army in 1861 and was later promoted to colonel, was away at war at the time of his son's birth. Josiah's father returned home before reenlisting and first saw him in 1863.

Josiah, later called "J. K.", had an "unsettled childhood." Because of his father's business interests, he frequently moved. Colonel Lilly remained in the South after the American Civil War, relocating his family to a Mississippi cotton plantation in 1865. Josiah and his parents were stricken with a mosquito-borne disease, probably malaria, in 1866. Josiah and his father recovered, but his mother died on August 20, 1866, eight months pregnant with a second son, who was stillborn. Josiah's devastated father abandoned the plantation and let it fall into disrepair. Colonel Lilly filed for bankruptcy in 1868. In the meantime Josiah returned to Greencastle and lived with his grandparents, Gustavus and Esther Lilly, while his father attempted to reverse his financial difficulties and find other employment.

Josiah's father found work as a pharmacist and drugstore proprietor in Greencastle and Indianapolis, Indiana, before opening a pharmacy in Paris, Illinois. Colonel Lilly married Maria Cynthia Sloan in 1869, and young Josiah soon joined his father and stepmother in Illinois, where they remained until the family moved to Indianapolis in 1873.

On May 10, 1876, Colonel Lilly founded his own pharmaceutical manufacturing business, which became known as Eli Lilly and Company, at 15 West Pearl Street in Indianapolis. Josiah, who was 14 at the time, was among its first employees. He had quit school to work in the laboratory of his father's company as an apprentice and errand boy. Within a few years the company became a very successful business that was known for manufacturing high-quality prescription drugs, especially gelatin- and sugar-coated pills and capsules and fruit-flavored elixirs. By 1879 company sales had grown to $48,000 ($1.66 million in 2025).

In 1880, Colonel Lilly sent Josiah to Philadelphia College of Pharmacy to increase his son's technical expertise so he could help develop the family business. Josiah graduated from the school in 1882, and returned to Indianapolis, where his father soon named him superintendent of the Lilly manufacturing laboratory, a position that J. K. held until in 1898 when he became company president.

== Career ==
=== Early career ===
In the early 1880s, while Lilly was superintendent of Eli Lilly and Company's laboratory, the company began manufacturing Succus Alterans, its first widely successful product, which was marketed as a treatment for venereal diseases, rheumatism, and skin diseases. The growing business rapidly expanded, adding new employees and relocating in 1881 to a larger complex at McCarty and Alabama streets, south of downtown Indianapolis. By 1890, when Lilly became the company's de facto head, it had grown into one of the largest businesses in Indiana and employed several hundred workers. Among its employees were Lilly's young sons, Eli and Joe, who ran errands and performed other odd jobs after school. Around 1890, Lilly assumed day-to-day management of the business while Colonel Lilly retired to focus on charitable and civic pursuits. Under Lilly's leadership, the company flourished despite the economic turmoil of the 1890s, surviving recession while continuing to grow through technological advances in manufacturing, including automated capsule production, and an increased emphasis on research and the mass production of high-quality medicinal drugs.

=== Company president ===
After Colonel Lilly died in 1898, Lilly became president of the family pharmaceutical business and heir to the family fortune. The company experienced substantial growth during the 1910s as it continued to expand production automation while its research department made incremental advances. During his tenure as president, Eli Lilly and Company introduced standardized manufacturing processes, expanded its sales force, and increased research efforts to develop new drugs. One of the company's most significant projects occurred in 1922, when Lilly signed an agreement with the Toronto firm Connaught Antitoxin Laboratories to produce insulin commercially on a mass scale. The company's trademarked name for the product was Iletin, which it began distributing in 1923.

Lilly's two sons also entered the family business. His eldest son, Eli, succeeded him as president in 1932, while Lilly continued as chairman of the board and devoted more of his time to philanthropy. Following Lilly's death in 1948, Eli served as chairman of the board (1948–1953 and 1966–1969) and honorary chairman (1953–1966 and 1969–1977), while Lilly's younger son and namesake, Josiah Jr. ("Joe"), served as president (1948–1953) and chairman of the board (1953–1966).

== Later years ==
In the 1930s, after retiring from the day-to-day operations of Eli Lilly and Company, Lilly pursued several personal and philanthropic interests. He became an orchid breeder and began collecting Stephen Foster music compositions and memorabilia. He maintained his extensive collection at Melodeon Hall (renamed Foster Hall), his private performance hall and library in Indianapolis.

== Philanthropist ==
Lilly was "a lifelong benefactor" to Indianapolis and active in many philanthropic organizations, including the Indianapolis Commercial Club, the local YMCA, Crown Hill Cemetery, the Indiana Historical Society, and the James Whitcomb Riley Memorial Association. He served as chairman of the Indianapolis Foundation and supported the Indianapolis Symphony Orchestra, The Children's Museum of Indianapolis, the city's Community Fund, Tuberculosis Association, Wheeler Rescue Mission, and the Red Cross. Lilly also served as a trustee of Purdue University and Philadelphia College of Pharmacy. He was a member of the Orchid Society of California.

=== Lilly Endowment ===
In 1937, Lilly and his sons, Eli and Joe, founded the Indianapolis-based Lilly Endowment with an initial contribution of Eli Lilly and Company stock valued at $280,000. Lilly served on the board and became its largest contributor, while his son Eli managed the private family endowment during its first twelve years. Over time, Lilly contributed Eli Lilly and Company stock worth a total of $86.8 million, including a $30 million bequest following his death in 1948; his two sons contributed stock with a combined value of $6.8 million. In 1998 the Lilly Endowment became the largest philanthropic endowment in the world in terms of assets and charitable giving. Although later surpassed by other foundations, it remained among the five largest in the United States as of 2014, with assets valued at $9.96 billion.

=== Music collection ===
Lilly was known for his extensive collection of composer Stephen Foster's music. In December 1933, he published Foster Hall Reproductions, a collection of 224 facsimiles of Foster's sheet music. The publication has been described as the first Gesamtausgaben ("collected works") of an American musical artist. According to author Mariana Whitmer in American Music, Lilly's dissatisfaction with what he viewed as a "small and distorted" sample of Foster recordings led him to commission Foster Hall Recordings, a ninety-six-disc set containing "the complete works of Stephen Foster as ... known in 1933." Lilly donated his Stephen Foster collection to the University of Pittsburgh in 1937. Fletcher Hodges Jr., whom Lilly hired to assist with the collection, curated the university's Foster archive at its Stephen Foster Memorial for fifty-one years. As of 2006, the archive contained approximately 30,000 documents.

== Personal life ==
During his college years, J. K. met and became engaged to Lilly Ridgley of Lexington, Kentucky. The couple married on November 18, 1882. Their eldest son, Eli Jr., was born on April 1, 1885, at the family's home on North Tennessee Street (renamed Capitol Street in 1895). When Eli was about eight years old, the family moved to a home on North Pennsylvania Street, where a second son, Josiah Jr. ("Joe"), was born on September 25, 1893. J. K. acquired 20 acres (8.1 hectares) of property north of Indianapolis in what became the Crows Nest neighborhood in 1928. His first wife, Lilly, who suffered from pernicious anemia, became an invalid and died on April 19, 1934. In 1935, 73-year-old Lilly married Lila Allison Humes, a 51-year-old widow. She was also the sister of Ruth Allison Lilly, Eli Jr.'s wife. Lilly and Lila had no children. She died in 1971.

In addition to their main residence in Indianapolis, the family maintained a cottage at Lake Wawasee in Kosciusko County, Indiana. Lilly's father built one of the summer resort's first cottages from 1886 to 1887 and founded the Wawasee Golf Club in 1891. From 1936 to 1938, Lilly constructed his own cottage, Anchors Aweigh, on the family's lakeside estate across the road from the golf club.

Lilly also established an apple orchard on property he purchased in 1896, 7 miles (11 km) north of downtown Indianapolis at 71st Street and College Avenue. In 1927, he commissioned a Tudor Revival-style private performance hall in the orchard and installed a custom-built pipe organ. He initially named the building Melodeon Hall, but renamed it Foster Hall in the 1930s as a tribute to composer Stephen Foster. In the mid-1960s, the Lilly family donated the property, including the music hall, to the Park School for boys. The present-day Park Tudor School occupies the site and continues to use the hall.

== Death ==
On February 8, 1948, Lilly died in Indianapolis at the age of 86. His estate was valued at $6.5 million at the time of his death. He is buried at Crown Hill Cemetery in Indianapolis.

== Legacy ==
Lilly's son Eli donated both his father's home and his own residence in the Indianapolis neighborhood of Crows Nest to Indiana University. He also provided the university with a $1 million endowment to maintain the properties.

Lilly's tenure at Eli Lilly and Company was marked by the introduction of standardized manufacturing methods, expansion of the company's sales organization, and establishment of branch offices in New York and New Orleans. During his presidency, the company also obtained the rights to commercially mass-produce insulin in cooperation with University of Toronto scientists, leading to the introduction of Iletin in 1923.

The company also established traditions of corporate philanthropy and employee support that continued after his death. Under his leadership, Eli Lilly and Company provided medicine and supplies to victims of the 1906 San Francisco earthquake and fire and, during economic downturns, reduced employee work hours instead of implementing widespread layoffs.

One of Lilly's most enduring legacies was the establishment of the Lilly Endowment in 1937 with his sons, Eli and Joe. The foundation became one of the world's largest charitable endowments and remains among the wealthiest philanthropic organizations in the United States.

== Honors and tributes ==
Lilly received the Remington Medal in 1942, awarded to an individual who "contributed most during the year to the advancement of the profession of pharmacy or whose contributions over a period of years are worthy of recognition".

Lilly was featured in the Indiana Historical Society exhibition "You Are There: Eli Lilly at the Beginning" at the Eugene and Marilyn Glick Indiana History Center in Indianapolis. The exhibition, displayed from October 2016 to January 2018, included a recreation of the first Lilly laboratory on Pearl Street in Indianapolis and a costumed interpreter portraying a teenage Lilly.

== Sources ==
- Alvarez, Tom, ed. (Fall 2016). "Fall Arts Guide". UNITE Indianapolis. Indianapolis: Joey Amato: 32.
- Bernstein, Adam (March 21, 2006). "Fletcher Hodges Jr., 99". Los Angeles Times.
- Sharon Blake (February 7, 1999). "Pitt Honors Founding Curator of Stephen Foster Collection". University of Pittsburgh.
- Bodenhamer, David J.; Barrows, Robert G., eds. (1994). The Encyclopedia of Indianapolis. Bloomington and Indianapolis: Indiana University Press. ISBN 0-253-31222-1.
- "Eli Lilly and Company History". Fundinguniverse.com.
- "Eli Lilly & Company" (PDF). Indiana Historical Society. Archived from the original (PDF) on July 29, 2016.
- Fletcher, Susan (May 10, 2005). "National Register of Historic Places Inventory Nomination Form: Foster Hall" (PDF). From "Indiana State Historic Architectural and Archaeological Research Database (SHAARD)" (Searchable database). Department of Natural Resources, Division of Historic Preservation and Archaeology.
- "Foundation Stats". Foundation Center.
- Hoover, Bob (March 14, 2006). "Obituary: Fletcher Hodges Jr.: Helped to preserve the music of Stephen Foster". Pittsburgh Post-Gazette. Block Communications. Archived from the original on September 29, 2007.
- Ivcevich, Kelly A. "Lilly Endowment, Inc". Learning to Give.
- "Josiah K. Lilly Named Remington Medallist for 1942" (pdf). Journal of the American Pharmacists Association. 3 (9): 312–13. 1942. doi:10.1016/S0095-9561(16)30433-9.
- Kremers, Edward; Sonnedecker, Glenn; Urdang, George (1986). Kremers and Urdang's History of Pharmacy. American Institute of the History of Pharmacy. ISBN 0-931292-17-4.
- Madison, James H (1989). Eli Lilly: A Life, 1885–1977. Indiana Historical Society. ISBN 0-87195-047-2.
- "The Man Behind State's Most Successful Startup". Kendallville New Sun. Kendallville, Indiana: KPC News. September 9, 2016.
- Marquis, Albert Nelson, ed. (1916). "Lilly, Josiah Kirby". Who's Who in America: A Biographical Dictionary of Notable Living Men and Women of the United States. A. N. Marquis and Company. p. 1482.
- "The Pharmaceutical Industry in Indiana" (PDF). Indiana Historical Society. Archived from the original (PDF) on June 8, 2013.
- Price, Nelson (1997). Indiana Legends: Famous Hoosiers From Johnny Appleseed to David Letterman. Carmel, Indiana: Guild Press of Indiana. pp. 57–61. ISBN 1-57860-006-5.
- Taylor Jr.; Robert M.; Errol Wayne Stevens; Mary Ann Ponder; Paul Brockman (1989). Indiana: A New Historical Guide. Indianapolis: Indiana Historical Society. ISBN 0-87195-048-0.
- Whitmer, Mariana (2012). "Josiah Kirby Lilly and the Foster Hall Collection". American Music. 30 (3): 326. doi:10.5406/americanmusic.30.3.0326. ISSN 0734-4392. S2CID 193243723.
- "World's Biggest Public Companies". Forbes.

Preceded by Eli Lilly	President of the Eli Lilly and Company; 1898-1932	Succeeded by Eli Lilly Jr.
