= Charles O. Dexter =

American hybridist

Charles Owen Dexter (1862–1943) was an American rhododendron hybridizer. Using the Chinese species Rhododendron fortunei, he produced hybrids characterized by dense foliage, large stature and flowers of superior size and color, many of which were also fragrant. Notable examples of his work include Scintillation, Betty Hume, Parker's Pink, GiGi, Mrs. W.R. Coe, Wheatley and Westbury.

Between 1921 and 1943 Dexter carried on a massive breeding program at his 76-acre (310,000 m^{2}) estate in Sandwich, Massachusetts. There he produced between 5,000 and 10,000 seedlings annually and gave thousands of plantings away to private gardens, nurseries and public botanical collections.

His estate is now operated as the Heritage Museums and Gardens which contains plantings of 125 of the known 145 Dexter cultivars.
