= Huddleston Farmhouse =

Historic house in Indiana, United States

- The Huddleston Farmhouse Inn
- U.S. National Register of Historic Places
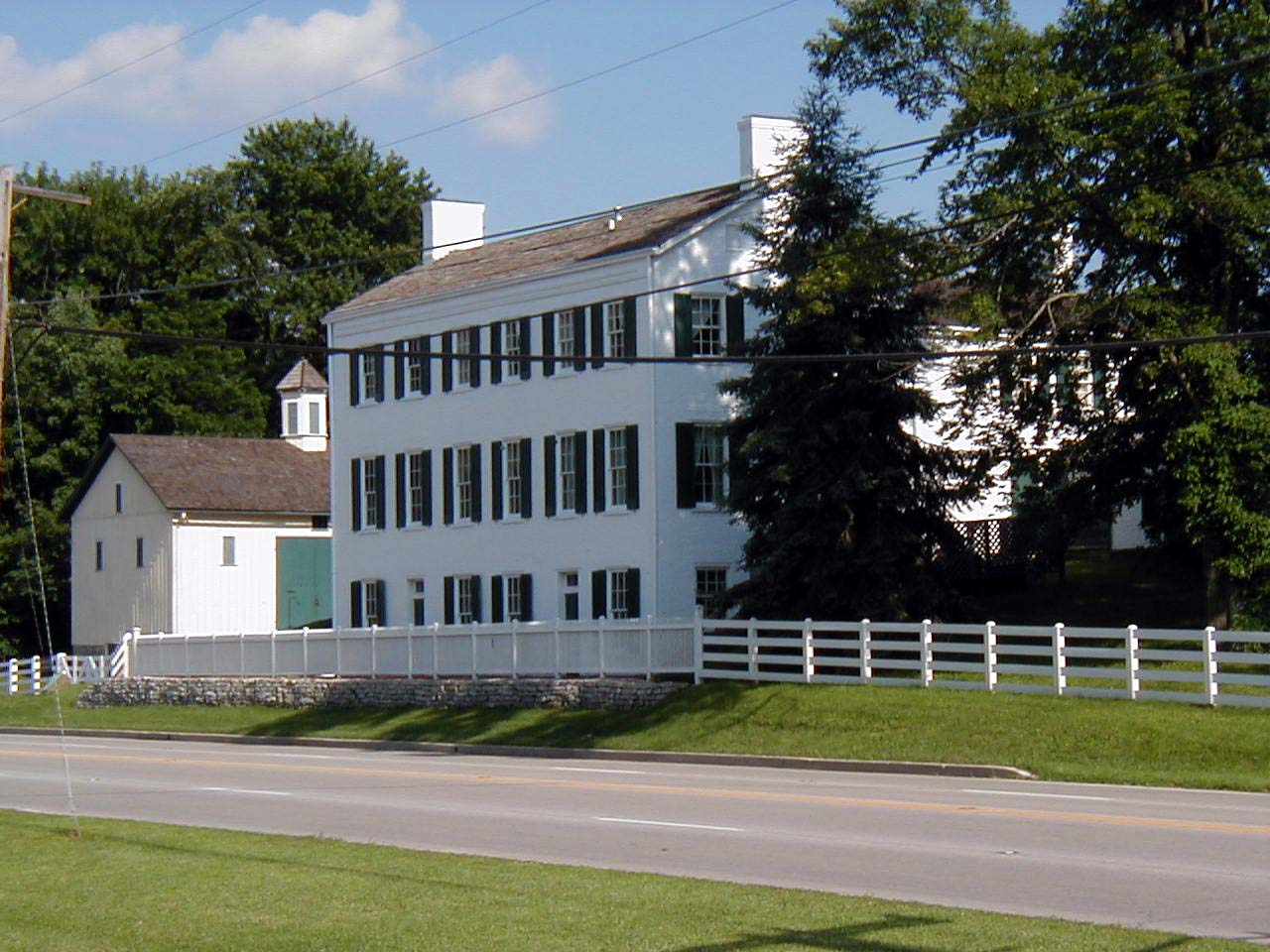

- Location within Indiana Location within the United States
- Location: Cambridge City, Indiana
- Coordinates: 39°48′43.8″N 85°11′14.1″W
- Area: 78 acres (32 ha)
- Built: 1838
- Architectural style: Federal
- NRHP reference No.: 75000037
- Added to NRHP: June 15, 1975

The Huddleston Farmhouse Inn in Cambridge City, Indiana, is a historic inn that once served travelers along the National Road. It was owned by former-Quaker John Huddleston who, with his wife Susannah, and 11 children, offered lodging, cooking materials, and a place for their horses to rest for the night.

The house is three stories high, using 125,000 bricks. The property consists of 78 acres (320,000 m^{2}). On the land includes the main house, spring kitchen, smoke house, and two barns. Some recents research on the property suggests that there may have been another building built on the property as well by the Huddlestons.

The main house is three stories. Before renovations the basement consisted of three separated rooms that could only be entered from outside. Two of the rooms were lodging for guests. The middle room was John's shop where he would sell items to travelers passing through. On the middle level there is a kitchen, a family room, a dining room, and a formal parlor. The third floor was where the bedrooms would have been.

The property was purchased by Indiana Landmarks in 1966 with funds provided by the organization's founder, Eli Lilly. The house, barn, and other outbuildings were restored and served as a combination museum and eastern regional office of Indiana Landmarks until the property was sold to private owners in 2023. The property was sold with Indiana Landmarks’ protective covenants to safeguard its architectural character.

It was listed on the National Register of Historic Places in 1975.
