= Foster Hall (Indianapolis, Indiana) =

- U.S. National Register of Historic Places
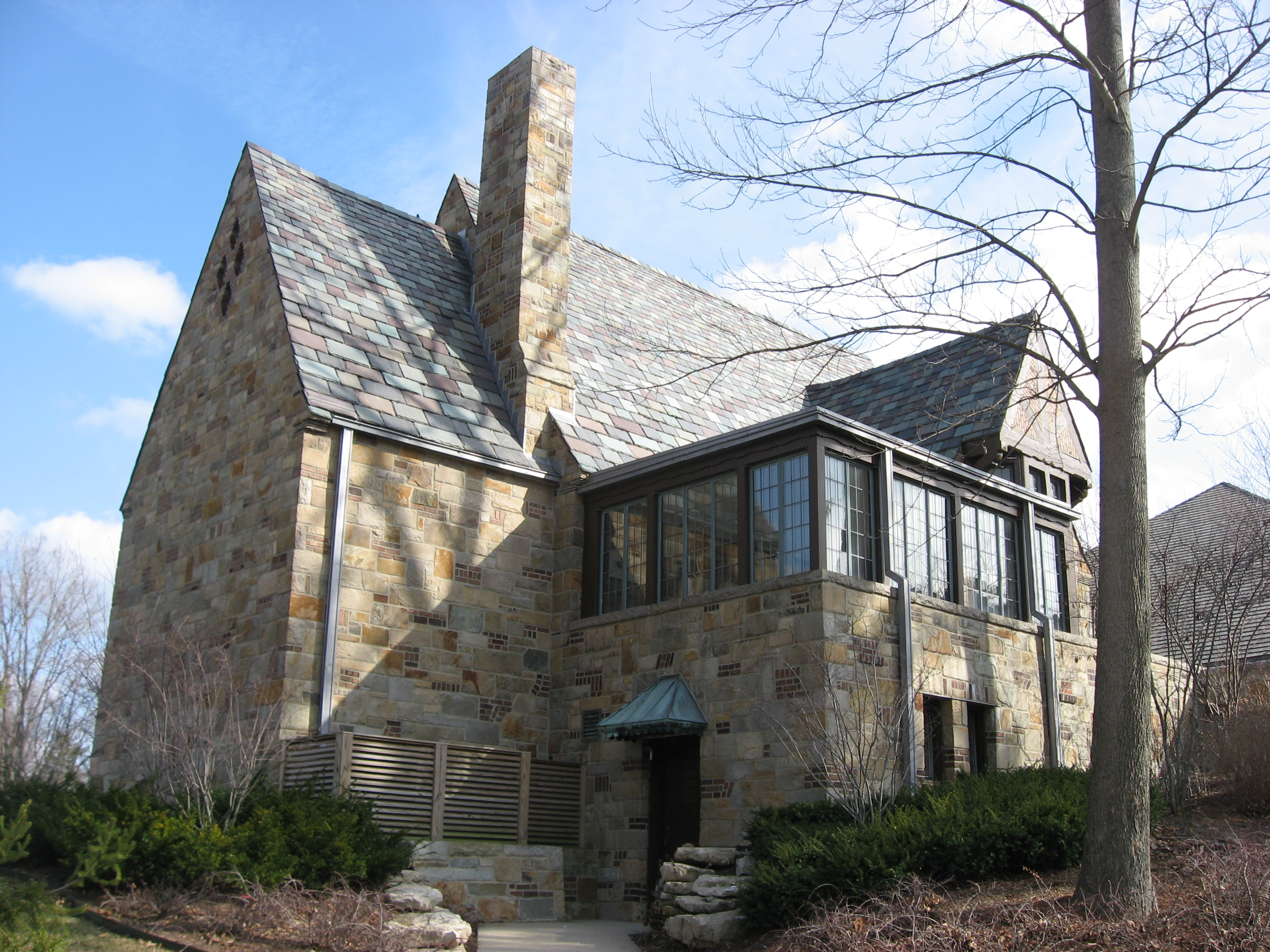
- Foster Hall at Park Tudor School

- Location within Indiana Location within the United States
- Location: 7200 N. College Ave., Indianapolis, Indiana
- Coordinates: 39°53′19″N 86°8′51″W
- Area: less than one acre
- Built: 1927
- Architect: Daggett, Robert Frost; et.al.
- Architectural style: Tudor Revival
- NRHP reference No.: 05001364
- Added to NRHP: December 6, 2005

Foster Hall, also known as Melodeon Hall, is located on the campus of Park Tudor School at 7200 N. College Ave. in Indianapolis, Indiana. The Tudor Revival style building was designed by Robert Frost Daggett and built in 1927. It is a 1 1/2-story, stone building with a steeply pitched slate gable roof with seven gables. It features leaded glass windows and sits on a raise basement. It was built for Josiah K. Lilly Sr. (1861–1948) to house his collection of Stephen Foster materials and serves the community as a reception, concert, and meeting facility.

It was added to the National Register of Historic Places in 2005.

== See also ==
- National Register of Historic Places listings in Marion County, Indiana
