= Eli Lilly (industrialist, born 1885) =

American industrialist and philanthropist

- Lilly, the third president of Eli Lilly and Company
- Born: Eli Lilly; April 1, 1885; Indianapolis, Indiana, U.S.
- Died: January 24, 1977 (aged 91); Indianapolis, Indiana, U.S.
- Resting place: Crown Hill Cemetery and Arboretum, Section 13, Lot 19; 39.819681°N 86.175803°W
- Education: Philadelphia College of Pharmacy and Science
- Occupation: Industrialist
- Known for: Pharmaceuticals; Philanthropy
- Title: President of Eli Lilly and Company
- Term: 1932–1948
- Predecessor: Josiah K. Lilly Sr.
- Successor: Josiah K. Lilly Jr.
- Political party: Republican
- Board member of: Lilly Endowment; Indiana Landmarks; Indiana Historical Society
- Spouse(s): Evelyn Fortune (m. 1907; div. 1926) Ruth Helen Allison (m. 1927; died 1973)
- Children: Evelyn (Evie); two sons, both named Eli, who died in infancy
- Parent(s): Josiah K. Lilly Sr. and Lilly Ridgely Lilly
- Relatives: Eli Lilly (grandfather); Josiah K. Lilly Sr. (father); Josiah K. Lilly Jr. (brother)

Eli Lilly (April 1, 1885 – January 24, 1977), sometimes referred to as Eli Lilly Jr. to distinguish him from his grandfather of the same name, was an American pharmaceutical industrialist and philanthropist from Indianapolis, Indiana. During his tenure as head of Eli Lilly and Company, which was founded by his grandfather, the company grew from a successful, family-owned business into a modern corporation and industry leader. Lilly served as the company president (1932–1948), chairman of the board of directors (1948–1961 and 1966–1969), and honorary chairman of the board (1961–1966 and 1969–1977).

Throughout his life, Lilly took a personal interest in the history of Indiana and his hometown of Indianapolis. A man of significant personal wealth, whose philanthropic contributions were often given anonymously, Lilly was also modest, quiet, and unassuming. He made substantial gifts and actively supported the work of individuals and groups who shared his passions for archaeology, state and local history, art, religion, education, and civic improvement.

In addition to his personal philanthropy, Lilly, with his father, Josiah K. Lilly Sr., and brother, Josiah K. Lilly Jr., established the Lilly Endowment, a philanthropic foundation that continues to operate. Lilly also wrote, edited, and contributed to published works related to the prehistory of Indiana, Christ Church Cathedral in Indianapolis, the Lenape's chronicle Walum Olum, Indiana's Lake Wawasee, and archaeologist Heinrich Schliemann. A politically conservative Republican and a lifelong member of the Episcopal church, Lilly's traditional values concerning family, home, and community service guided his work in the pharmaceutical industry and in civic life.

== Early life and education ==
Lilly was born on April 1, 1885, in Indianapolis, the eldest son of Josiah K. Lilly Sr. and Lilly Maria Ridgely Lilly. He was named for his grandfather, Colonel Eli Lilly, who founded Eli Lilly and Company, the family's pharmaceutical business in Indianapolis. Lilly grew up in Indianapolis at 476 North Tennessee Street (renamed Capitol in 1885), eight blocks north of the Indiana Statehouse. The family moved to a larger home on North Pennsylvania Street in Indianapolis. The family attended Christ Church, an Episcopal church located on Monument Circle in the city's center, and spent the summer months at their cottage on Lake Wawasee in Kosciusko County, Indiana. At the lake, Lilly enjoyed hiking, fishing, swimming, and sailing.

After attending a public elementary school in Indianapolis and one term at Culver Military Academy in northern Indiana, Lilly graduated from Shortridge High School in Indianapolis. He went on to study at his father's alma mater, the Philadelphia College of Pharmacy and Science, where his doctoral thesis was on cannabis. He graduated in 1907 with a degree as a pharmaceutical chemist and returned to Indianapolis to begin his career in the family business.

== Career ==
According to his biographer, James H. Madison, "Lilly was modest, unassuming, and quiet, yet under his placid exterior was an inquiring mind and abundant physical energy" and a man who "believed in hard work, all his life." As a boy, Lilly worked at Eli Lilly and Company during school vacations at the family's pharmaceutical plant on McCarty Street in Indianapolis, where he washed bottles and did other tasks. He never thought of working anywhere else.

After graduating from the Philadelphia College of Pharmacy and Science in Philadelphia, in 1907, Lilly returned to Indianapolis to join his family's firm, Eli Lilly and Company. He first served as head and the only employee of the company's newly created Economic Department, where his job was to explore cost effective and more efficient ways to operate the business. In addition to studying the company's manufacturing processes, Lilly loved mechanical gadgets and introduced new manufacturing equipment to increase production, reduce waste, and improve quality. In 1909, Lilly was promoted to superintendent of the manufacturing division. Within two years, he brought new principles of scientific management to the company to improve efficiency and reward workers for meeting and exceeding production requirements. As the business expanded and modernized in the years preceding World War I, Lilly and his brother, Josiah K. Lilly Jr., continued to work in managerial positions, while their father remained as head of the growing company.

In the 1920s and 1930s, Eli Lilly and Company experienced significant growth and financial success as it expanded research and product development efforts. Lilly was actively involved in major projects that brought the Indianapolis company to the forefront as a top research-based pharmaceutical manufacturer. Insulin, which the company produced and sold under the trade name of Iletin, was the result of a pioneering collaboration with University of Toronto research scientists. In May 1922, Lilly and the company's director of biochemical research, George Henry Alexander Clowes, met in Toronto with John Macleod, Frederick Banting, and Charles Best, the scientists who had discovered insulin as an effective treatment for diabetes. The meeting resulted in an agreement between the university and the Indianapolis manufacturer to mass-produce and distribute the drug. Iletin became the most important drug in the company's history and Banting and Macleod earned the Nobel Prize in 1923 for their groundbreaking work.

Lilly's other significant achievements included contributions to improved production and research. He devoted hours to developing a straight-line production system for the company's new Building 22, which was completed in 1926 and improved the company's manufacturing processes. As research expanded and the company introduced new products, including the sedative Amytal, the antiseptic Merthiolate, and other drugs such as ephedrine, Lilly strengthened ties with university scientists by establishing research fellowships at American and European universities. Another successful collaboration, this one with researchers at Harvard University and the University of Rochester for drugs to treat anemia, built on the lessons learned from the insulin project and earned the university scientists, George R. Minot, William P. Murphy, and George Whipple, the Nobel Prize for medicine in 1934.

Lilly became president of Eli Lilly and Company on January 26, 1932, and remained at its head until 1948. Lilly showed great management skill and concern for the welfare of his employees. During his tenure as president, the company grew to include 6,912 employees and had sales of $115 million in 1948. While the company expanded operations in Indianapolis and overseas, it established a reputation as a good place to work by providing employee assistance, sound wages, maintaining a positive outlook, and desegregating its workforce. As increased governmental regulations challenged the industry, the U.S. Justice Department investigated Eli Lilly and Company and two other pharmaceutical firms for violation of the Sherman Antitrust Act, charging them with fixing insulin prices. Legal counsel advised Lilly to avoid the high costs and negative publicity from an extended lawsuit by pleading nolo contendere, which he did, so the company could move forward.

Under Lilly's leadership during World War II, the company supported the war effort by producing blood plasma in conjunction with the American Red Cross. It also manufactured encephalitis vaccine, antitoxin for gas poisoning, and vaccines for influenza, typhus, insulin, Merthiolate, and other drugs. Lilly was especially proud of the company's collaboration with the U.S. government and others on large-scale production of penicillin. In the renovated Curtiss-Wright complex on Kentucky Avenue in Indianapolis, Lilly employees were producing more than 250,000 ampules of penicillin per day by the late 1940s.

In the postwar years, Lilly remained active in company business as it expanded overseas with the construction of a new plant in Basingstoke, England, and supporting research on new drugs. He also reorganized the company, appointing non-family members to top management positions and began the transition to non-family management of the company. Lilly was president of the company from 1932 to 1947. Following the death of his father in 1948, Lilly served as chairman of the board from 1948 to 1961, while his brother, J. K. Lilly Jr., was the company's president, and from 1966 to 1969, when Eugene N. Beesley was elected president. Lilly was honorary chairman from 1961 to 1966 and from 1969 to 1977.

== Personal interests and philanthropy ==
Lilly was modest, a man of simple tastes and traditional values. In politics, Lilly was a conservative Republican; however, he was a friend and supporter of Indiana governor Roger D. Branigin, a Democrat, who shared some of Lilly's personal interests. Lilly was especially interested in history and archaeology and enjoyed reading, writing, music, and art. His wealth allowed him to pursue a wide range of philanthropic interests and hobbies, many of which related to Indiana history.

Lilly was also known for his philanthropic activities and as founder of the Indianapolis-based Lilly Endowment Inc. along with his father J. K. Lilly Sr. and his brother J. K. Lilly Jr. In 1937 Lilly with his father and his brother, established the endowment with initial gifts of 17,500 shares of their personal stock in Eli Lilly and Company, valued at $280,000, and made additional financial gifts through 1971. In total, their combined gifts were 32 million shares of pharmaceutical stock, valued at $94 million, with several non-family members contributing additional shares of stock worth an estimated $1.1 million. Lilly served as the Lilly Endowment's secretary/treasurer from 1937 to 1966, as its president from 1966 to 1972, as chairman 1972 to 1975, and as honorary chairman from 1975 to 1977. As of December 31, 2011, the Lilly Endowment "held $6.2 billion in unrestricted assets" and "approved $208.7 million in new grants" to support "community development, education and religion".

For Lilly, philanthropy was "personal, thoughtful, and ambitious." He favored areas that interested him personally and took an active leadership role in a number of organizations that he supported financially, but "his was never a selfish, self-centered philanthropy". Lilly's donations were often anonymous. Lilly chose projects related to archaeology, history, historic preservation, education, and religion, especially when they were connected to Indiana and Indianapolis.

=== Archaeology ===
Lilly's fascination with prehistoric archaeology grew from a collector of artifacts into a serious academic interest. Lilly's own research and writing, as well as his financial support, helped establish the study of archaeology in Indiana. Lilly was especially interested in archaeological research and compiled a bibliography on the subject, published in 1932. For years Lilly quietly and modestly supported archaeological fieldwork, site surveys, and excavations. In addition, Lilly became a close friend and patron of archaeologist Glenn Albert Black, who found work in the Indiana Historical Society's archaeology division. Lilly funded Black's salary and field expenses. Lilly also provided fellowships to Yale University and other colleges to support archaeological studies. Scholars Charles (Carl) F. Voegelin and his wife, Erminie Wheeler-Voegelin, were both recipients of Lilly's archaeology fellowships from Yale.

Lilly's contribution to the archaeological work at Angel Mounds in southern Indiana was longstanding. In 1938, when funds could not be obtained elsewhere, Lilly provided the Indiana Historical Society with $68,000 of the $71,957 needed to purchase the state's most important archaeological site and save it from real estate development. Lilly's friend Glenn Black moved to southern Indiana in 1939 to supervise work at the site. Indiana University and the Indiana Historical Society hosted summer school sessions at Angel Mounds from 1945 to 1962 with Lilly Endowment funding and Lilly's sponsorship. In 1967, with Lilly's encouragement and Lilly Endowment funding, the Indiana Historical Society published Angel Site: An Archaeological, History, and Ethnological Study, which was based on Black's research. Lilly also supported the development of an interpretive center and reconstruction of several buildings at Angel Mounds through funding from the Lilly Endowment. As a further tribute to his close friend and their passion for archaeology, Lilly donated his archaeological library and artifact collection to the Glenn A. Black Laboratory of Archaeology at Indiana University in Bloomington. The Lilly Endowment provided funds for its construction.

=== History and historic preservation ===
Lilly became a member of the Indiana Historical Society in 1922, serving as its president from 1933 to 1946, as executive committee member from 1947 to 1969, and as a member of the board of trustees from 1969 until his death in 1977. Lilly's involvement began with his personal interest in archaeology and friendship with Glenn Black and Christopher Coleman, secretary of the Indiana Historical Society and director of the Indiana Historical Commission. Lilly had a personal as well as financial interest in the affairs of the organization, which included contributions to an endowment in excess of $2.5 million for an addition to the Indiana State Library and Historical Building in Indianapolis that would also house the Indiana Historical Society. Lilly attended dedication ceremonies for the building's four-story expansion in October 1976, a year before his death. Lilly and his brother also subsidized numerous projects and publications, including those related to archaeology, Indiana authors, Walam Olum, the paintings of George Winter, the diaries of Calvin Fletcher, and a Pulitzer Prize–winning history of the Old Northwest, among others. Upon his death, Lilly left the Indiana Historical Society a substantial endowment, making it one of the wealthiest organizations of its kind in the United States.

Lilly's personal philanthropy also included contributions to the preservation and restoration of historic houses in Indianapolis and New Harmony, Indiana, and Shakertown, Kentucky. Lilly, along with other Hoosiers interested in preservation, founded the Historic Landmarks Foundation of Indiana (now Indiana Landmarks) to aid in the preservation of structures significant to the historical and cultural development of Indiana. In 1962, Lilly purchased, restored, and furnished Kemper house, a Victorian home in Indianapolis, saving it from demolition. Later that same year, HLFI purchased the Morris-Butler House, a home in the historic Old Northside neighborhood of Indianapolis, and with Lilly's help restored it to serve as a museum of mid-Victorian decorative arts and preservation education. With Lilly's assistance and a financial gift, the foundation also acquired the historic Huddleston farm in east-central Indiana in 1966 and restored its three-story, Federal-style brick home, which once served as a stop for travelers along the National Road.

Lilly also purchased and contributed to the preservation of the William Conner home. His gift, in 1964, of this historic home in Hamilton County, Indiana, to Earlham College led to the development of Conner Prairie, an outdoor, living history museum. Lilly's interest in preservation led to involvement in other projects, including restoration of Crown Hill Cemetery's Waiting Station, the Indianapolis City Market, and the Lockerbie Square neighborhood in Indianapolis, among others.

A lifelong resident of Indiana, Lilly was known for his deep affection for his home state. In addition to a primary residence in Indianapolis, Lilly owned three side-by-side large residences on Lake Wawasee in Kosciusko County, Indiana, just north of Our Lady Of The Lake Seminary. An avid sailor, he also assisted with the founding of the Wawassee Yacht Club.

=== Art, education, and religion ===
Lilly's wealth allowed him to acquire a significant art collection. Although he owned a collection of Paul Revere silver and paintings by artists such as Gilbert Stuart and Maxfield Parrish, Lilly's particular interest was in Chinese art, which he began collecting in the mid-1940s and donated to the Herron Art Museum (now the Indianapolis Museum of Art) in 1960. Lilly also helped with fundraising to construct the museum's new facility, built on the 42-acre (17 ha) estate of his brother. The new building was a point of civic pride for Lilly, who donated $1.7 million in pharmaceutical company stock for its construction and provided for the institution in his will.

Lilly had a special interest in supporting religious-based, liberal arts colleges in Indiana. Wabash College in Crawfordsville, Indiana, where Lilly served as a trustee, was a favorite. Lilly also donated to his alma mater, the Philadelphia College of Pharmacy. Through the Lilly Endowment, Lilly supported at least ten of Indiana's private colleges, including Earlham College, as well as Transylvania University and Berea College in Kentucky. The endowment also provided support for black colleges in the South and the United Negro College Fund. Indiana University, the University of Wisconsin, and later in Lilly's life, Purdue University, also received funding through the Lilly Endowment for special projects of personal interest to Lilly.

A lifelong Episcopalian, Lilly was especially dedicated to Christ Church, the Lilly family's church on Monument Circle in Indianapolis. As a young boy, Lilly sang in the church's choir. Later, he served as a vestryman. Lilly combined his interests in history and the church by writing History of the Little Church on the Circle, published in 1957. Christ Church, as well as the Episcopal Diocese of Indianapolis, were recipients of several substantial gifts from Lilly for the church's upkeep, missionary work, and community service, provided that Christ Church remained on the Circle in downtown Indianapolis. In the 1960s displeasure with the political activism of Peter Lawson, the dean at Christ Church, caused Lilly to discontinue his financial support and attend services elsewhere; however, he returned to the church and resumed his financial support following Lawson's resignation in 1971.

== Personal life ==
On August 29, 1907, Lilly married his high school sweetheart, Evelyn Fortune, and moved to a house at 12 East Eleventh Street in Indianapolis. Within a few years they had moved to other houses on Indianapolis's north side, not far from his parents' home. Lilly and his first wife had two sons, one born in 1908 and the other in 1910, but both died in infancy. A daughter, Evelyn (Evie) was born on September 25, 1918. The Lillys' marriage ended in divorce in 1926. Lilly's ex-wife moved to Massachusetts and was awarded custody of their daughter. Over the years Lilly provided financial support and maintained contact with his daughter, who also spent time with her father in Indianapolis and at Lake Wawasee. Lilly's daughter, who had no children of her own, died of cancer on April 5, 1970.

On November 7, 1927, Lilly married Ruth Helen Allison, his secretary. The two had worked together for seven years. They were married for more than forty-five years. The couple collected art and antiques, and built an expansive, three-story home in Crows Nest, at 5807 Sunset Lane in Indianapolis, on a portion of his father's 20-acre (8.1 ha). Lilly used his grandfather's Maryland birthplace as a model for the home's exterior. The Crows Nest neighborhood became one of the most exclusive in Indianapolis. The couple had no children. Ruth died of cancer on March 14, 1973, at the age of 81.

== Later years ==
After Lilly stepped down as president of Eli Lilly and Company, he had more time to devote to personal interests and was active in community affairs. Still, as chairman of the board, he remained involved in major decisions affecting the company, maintained regular office hours, and kept in contact with senior management. In 1958 the American Pharmaceutical Association awarded Lilly its prestigious Remington Honor Medal.

As he grew older, Lilly enjoyed reading, music, art collecting, woodworking, traveling, and writing. He also continued to pursue philanthropic interests in archaeology, history, and historic preservation, where he contributed financial support with his own resources as well as those of the Lilly Endowment.

Lilly outlived his brother, wife, and daughter as well as many close friends and colleagues. Lilly had good health for most of his life, but in later years his hearing and sight began to fail. Despite these challenges, he continued to socialize, enjoy trips to Lake Wawasee, and attend civic events in Indianapolis. In 1976, when Lilly was in his nineties, he attended the Eli Lilly and Company's 100th anniversary gala.

Prior to his death, Lilly made arrangements for the disposition of his estate, which included real estate, company stock, cash, and bonds. When he died, Lilly's estate was estimated at more than $165.7 million, the majority of which continued to support the philanthropic interests of Lilly and his second wife, Ruth. Per Lilly's instructions, funeral arrangements following his death on January 24, 1977, were simple. Several days after Lilly's funeral service and burial at Crown Hill Cemetery, a memorial service was held at Christ Church in Indianapolis.

== Legacy ==
As a man of great wealth and numerous interests, Lilly devoted a great deal of time and money in support of organizations involved in history, archaeology, historic preservation, education, and religion in his home state of Indiana. In addition, Lilly took an active role and maintained close personal relationships with leaders in the organizations that he supported financially. While Lilly gave away millions during his lifetime, on his own or through the Lilly Endowment, the bulk of his wealth was distributed following his death in 1977. In addition to his financial contributions to the Lilly Endowment, Lilly was a longtime supporter of archeological research as well as the archaeological work at Angel Mounds in southern Indiana. Lilly also contributed to the establishment of the Glenn A. Black Laboratory at Indiana University in Bloomington, which was dedicated in 1971. In addition, Lilly was supportive of historic preservation efforts in Indiana and at Shakertown, Kentucky. Major benefactors of Lilly's generosity included Indiana University, who received Lilly's home on Sunset Lane in Indianapolis as well as his father's home next door.

Following his death, thirteen of Lilly's "most favored institutions" received 80 percent of his stock holdings in the pharmaceutical company. Butler University, the Children's Museum of Indianapolis, Christ Church, the Indianapolis Museum of Art, the Indiana Historical Society, Earlham College, the Philadelphia College of Pharmacy, and Wabash College each received 309,904 shares of Eli Lilly and Company stock worth an estimated $13.5 million at the time of his death. Five other institutions each received 123, 961 shares of pharmaceutical stock: Historic Landmarks Foundation of Indiana, Orchard School Foundation, Park-Tudor Foundation, Saint Paul's Episcopal Church, and Trinity Episcopal Church. In addition, eleven of Ruth Lilly's special interests received the remaining 20 percent of her husband's shares in Eli Lilly and Company stock: the American Committee for Keep, the Children's Museum of Indianapolis, Cooperative for Relief Everywhere, Day Nursery Association of Indianapolis, Episcopal Diocese of Indianapolis, Fellowship in Prayer, Save the Children Federation, the Washington Cathedral, and three schools in Georgia, Mississippi, and Kentucky.

== Works ==
- Lilly, Eli. "Bibliography on Indiana Archaeology". Indiana History Bulletin. 9 (1932). Indianapolis: Indiana Historical Bureau: 445–79.
- Lilly, Eli (1960). Early Wawasee Days: Traditions, Tales and Memories Concerning that Delectable Spot, Lake Wawasee. Indianapolis, Ind.: Studio Press.
- Lilly, Eli (1957). History of the Little Church on the Circle: Christ Church Parish, Indianapolis, 1837–1955. Indianapolis: Indiana Historical Society.
- Lilly, Eli (1937). Prehistoric Antiquities of Indiana: A description of the more notable earthworks, mounds, implements and ceremonial objects left in Indiana by our predecessors, together with some information as to their origin and antiquity, and the prehistory of Indiana. Indianapolis: Indiana Historical Society.
- Lilly, Eli, ed. (1961). Schliemann in Indianapolis. Indianapolis: Indiana Historical Society.
- C. Rafinesque; Eli Lilly; Erminie Voegelin; Joe E. Pierce; Paul Weer; Glenn A. Black; Georg K. Neumann (1954). Walam Olum; or, Red Score, the Migration Legend of the Lenni Lenape or Delaware Indians. A new translation, interpreted by linguistic, historical, archaeological, ethnological, and physical anthropological studies. Translated by Voegelin, Charles F. Indianapolis: Indiana Historical Society. OCLC 1633009.

== Sources ==
- Boomhower, Ray E. "Destination Indiana: Huddleston Farmhouse Inn Museum". Traces of Indiana and Midwestern History. 6 (4). Indianapolis: Indiana Historical Society: 28–29.
- Cox, Stephen. "The William Conner House, 1823–1993. II. New Life: Eli Lilly and the First Restoration". Traces of Indiana and Midwestern History. 5 (1). Indianapolis: Indiana Historical Society: 24–27.
- Madison, James H. (1989). Eli Lilly: A Life, 1885–1977. Indianapolis: Indiana Historical Society. ISBN 0-87195-047-2.
- Madison, James H. "Eli Lilly: The Middle Years, 1907–1948". Traces of Indiana and Midwestern History. 1 (3). Indianapolis: Indiana Historical Society: 6–19.
- Madison, James H. (1988). Eli Lilly, Archaeologist: A lecture delivered at Angel Mounds National Historic Landmark, Evansville, Indiana, on 1 April 1987. Indianapolis: Indiana Historical Society.
- Mueller, Shirley M. (Summer 2013). "Tug-of-War: Mr. Lilly Collects". Traces of Indiana and Midwestern History. 25 (3). Indianapolis: Indiana Historical Society: 18–25.
- Ruegamer, Lana (1980). A History of the Indiana Historical Society, 1830–1980. Indianapolis: Indiana Historical Society.
- Sallee, Tiffany C. "The Grand Old Master: Pioneer Hoosier Artist Jacob Cox". Traces of Indiana and Midwestern History. 10 (1). Indianapolis: Indiana Historical Society: 4–11.
- Thornbrough, Gayle (1977). Eli Lilly, Archaeologist and Historian, 1885–1977. Indianapolis: Indiana Historical Society.
- Weintraut, Linda and Jane R. Nolan. "The Secret Life of Building 314". Traces of Indiana and Midwestern History. 8 (3). Indianapolis: Indiana Historical Society: 16–27.
- "Eli Lilly". Indiana Historical Society.
- "Eli Lilly Papers, 1937–1961 Collection Guide" (PDF). Indiana Historical Society. 2012-05-31. Archived from the original (PDF) on 2016-07-29.
- Lilly Endowment, Inc. '87: A Family Legacy for 50 Years. Indianapolis: Lilly Endowment, Inc. 1988.
- "Lilly Endowment issues 2011 annual report: Persevere" (PDF). Indianapolis: Lilly Endowment, Inc. 2012-05-31. Archived from the original (news release) on 2016-03-04.

Preceded by Josiah K. Lilly Sr.	President of the Eli Lilly and Company; 1932–1948	Succeeded by Josiah K. Lilly Jr.
