= Park Tudor School =

Prep school in Indianapolis, Indiana, US

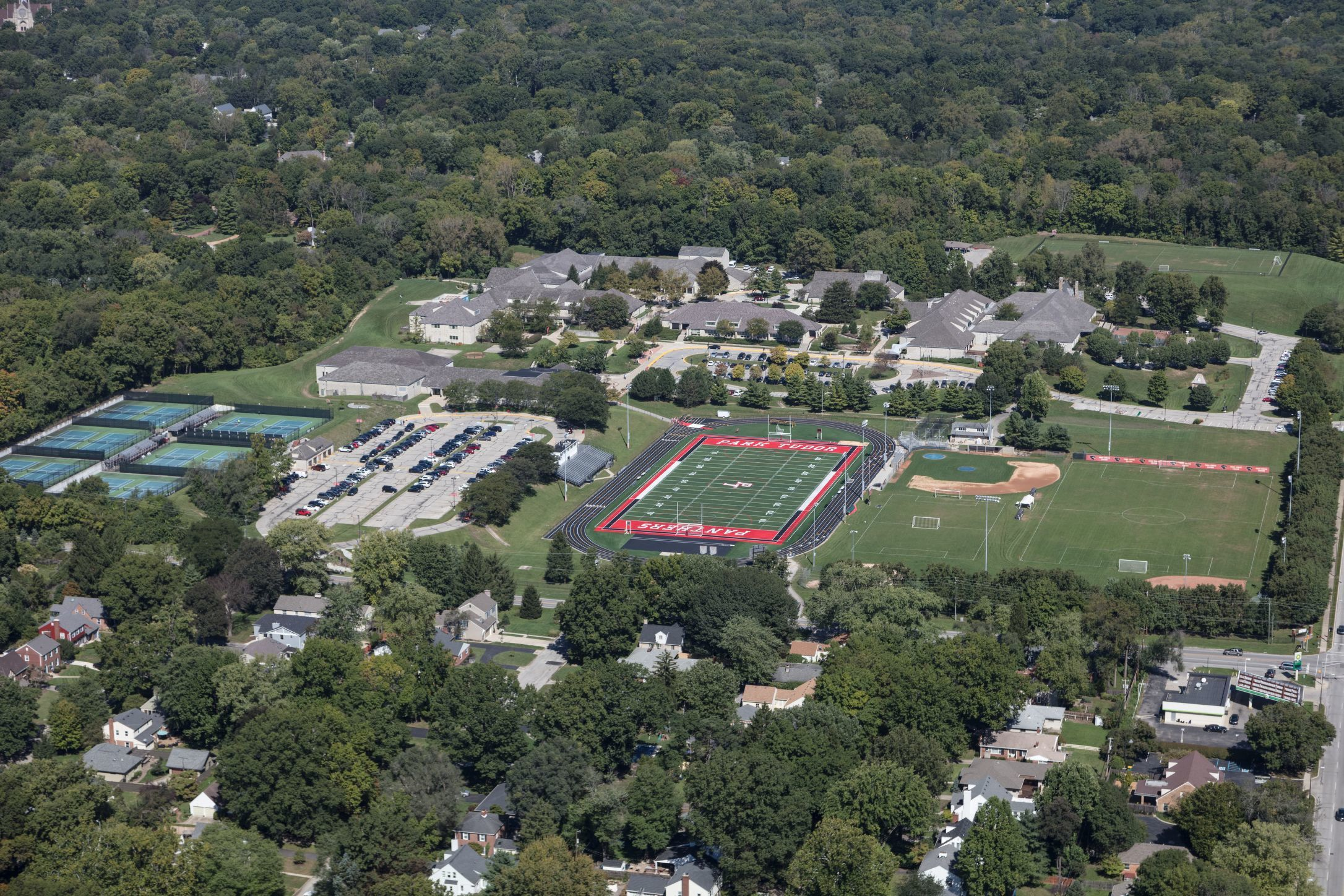
- Park Tudor campus in 2016

Location
- 7200 North College Avenue; Indianapolis, Marion County, Indiana 46240; United States; 39°53′09″N 86°08′53″W

Information
- Type: Independent School
- Motto: Exceptional Educators. Extraordinary Opportunities.
- Established: 1902
- Grades: Junior Kindergarten-Grade 12
- Color
- Athletics: 16 varsity sports
- Athletics conference: Pioneer Conference (Indiana)
- Nickname: Panthers
- Newspaper: The Tribune
- Website: www.parktudor.org

Park Tudor School is a coeducational independent college preparatory day school founded in 1902. It offers programs from junior kindergarten through high school. It is located in the Meridian Hills neighborhood of Indianapolis, Indiana, USA. A merger of Tudor Hall School for Girls (founded in 1902) and the all-male Park School (founded in 1914) formed the present-day school in 1970.

Park Tudor campus in the fall.

Foster Hall was named for composer Stephen Foster.

== History ==
Park Tudor is the product of a merger of two single-sex independent schools, Tudor Hall School for Girls and Park School.

Tudor Hall School for Girls was established in 1902 by Fredonia Allen and James Cumming Smith. Allen named the school after her mother, Ann Tudor Allen. The school was originally located at 16th and Meridian streets in Indianapolis. It later moved to a two-building campus at 32nd and Meridian streets where it remained for several decades. In 1960, Tudor Hall moved to the Charles B. Sommers estate on Cold Spring Road, next to Park School. In addition to the day school program, it fostered a significant boarding program. After the 1970 merger with Park School, Tudor Hall was consolidated with Park School into the new College Avenue campus.

Major buildings on the campus include the historic Foster Hall (named after composer Stephen Foster by Foster enthusiast/collector Eli Lilly Jr.), Allen W. Clowes Commons dining hall (1967), Frederic M. Ayres Auditorium (1976,2021), Jane Holton Upper School (1970), Middle School (1988), Lower School (1967), Hilbert Early Education Center (1997), Fine Arts Building (1976), Ruth Lilly Science Center (1989), and the Irsay Family Sports Center for Health and Wellness (2021–22).

== Athletics ==
Park Tudor is a member of the Pioneer Conference. The school fields teams for the Upper School and Middle School in baseball, basketball, cheerleading, crew, cross country, football, golf, lacrosse, soccer, softball, swimming, tennis, track & field, wrestling, and volleyball.

The 2010-11 varsity boys basketball team won the IHSAA Class 2A State Finals in March 2011. The team followed with another IHSAA Class 2A State Championship in 2012. On March 29, 2014, Park Tudor School's varsity basketball team won the IHSAA Class 2A State Finals again.

The girls' soccer team won the soccer program's first state championship in November 2019.

State Championships

Taken from IHSAA State Championship History

Sport	Year(s)
Baseball (1)	1999
Boys Basketball (4)	2011, 2012, 2014, 2015
Boys Soccer (1)	2022
Girls Soccer (3)	2019, 2022, 2023
Boys Tennis (7)	1990, 1996, 1997, 1998, 2002, 2006, 2009
Girls Tennis (6)	1998, 2000, 2005, 2006, 2007, 2008
Boys Lacrosse (1)	2001

== Notable alumni ==
=== Athletics ===
- Trevon Bluiett, professional basketball player
- Ed Carpenter, auto racing driver
- Kevin "Yogi" Ferrell, professional basketball player
- Neil Funk, professional sport commentator; NBA
- Jaren Jackson Jr., professional basketball player
- Micah Johnson, professional baseball player, artist

=== Arts ===
- Lucy Bowen McCauley, choreographer, dancer, teacher and Artistic Director of Bowen McCauley Dance Company
- Drew Elliott, creative director, fashion and judge
- Bertina Foltz, associate editor of Vogue
- Janet "Genêt" Flanner, writer and journalist
- Jake Lloyd, actor
- J. B. Rogers, film director and producer
- Edgar Sarratt, musician

=== Business ===
- Carlie Irsay-Gordon, principal owner, executive and CEO of Indianapolis Colts
- David McLane, television producer, wrestling promoter and ESPN series creator
- Eli Simon, CEO of Simon Property Group

=== Philanthropy ===
- Anne Hendricks Bass, documentary filmmaker and philanthropist
- Thomas W. Binford, entrepreneur and philanthropist
- Ruth Lilly, philanthropist

=== Politics ===
- John C. Ruckelshaus, American lawyer and politician

=== STEM ===
- Bernard Vonnegut, atmospheric scientist
- Melanie Wood, mathematician

== See also ==
- List of high schools in Indiana
- List of schools in Indianapolis
