= List of wealthiest charitable foundations =

This is a list of wealthiest charitable foundations worldwide. It consists of the 54 largest charitable foundations, private foundations engaged in philanthropy, and other charitable organizations such as charitable trusts that have disclosed their assets. In many countries, asset disclosure is not legally required or made public.

Only nonprofit foundations are included in this list. Organizations that are part of a larger company are excluded, such as holding companies.

The entries are ordered by the size of the organization's financial endowment. The endowment value is a rounded estimate measured in United States dollars, based on the exchange rates on December 31, 2024. Due to fluctuations in holdings, currency exchange and asset values, this list only represents the valuation of each foundation on a single day.

== Wealthiest foundations by endowment value ==
Rank	Organisation	Country	Headquarters	Endowment (USD)	Endowment (home currency)	Founded	Ref.
1	OpenAI Foundation	United States	San Francisco	$130 billion		2025	
2	Hans Wilsdorf Foundation	Switzerland	Geneva	~$100-150 billion	~CHF 100-150 billion	1945	
3	Novo Nordisk Foundation	Denmark	Copenhagen	$109 billion	kr.694 billion	1989	
4	Tata Trusts	India	Mumbai	$100+ billion		1919	
5	Gates Foundation	United States	Seattle	$70.2 billion		2000	
6	Wellcome Trust	United Kingdom	London	$42.8 billion	£34.6 billion	1936	
7	Stichting INGKA Foundation	Netherlands	Leiden	$37.3 billion	€34.3 billion	1982	
8	Knut and Alice Wallenberg Foundation	Sweden	Stockholm	$32.9 billion	kr.303 billion	1917	
9	Mastercard Foundation	Canada	Toronto	$31.5 billion		2006	
10	Fundación La Caixa	Spain	Palma de Mallorca	$28.1 billion	€27 billion	1904	
11	Howard Hughes Medical Institute	United States	Chevy Chase, Maryland	$27.1 billion		1953	
12	RAG-Stiftung	Germany	Essen, Germany	$24 billion		2007	
13	Azim Premji Foundation	India	Bangalore	$21 billion		2001	
14	Open Society Foundations	United States	New York City	$19.6 billion		1993	
15	Fondazione Cariplo	Italy	Milano	$15.4 billion	€13.1 billion	1991	
16	Lilly Endowment	United States	Indianapolis	$15.1 billion		1937	
17	Ford Foundation	United States	New York City	$13.7 billion		1936	
18	Silicon Valley Community Foundation	United States	San Jose, California	$13.6 billion		2007	
19	William and Flora Hewlett Foundation	United States	Menlo Park, California	$13.3 billion		1967	
20	Garfield Weston Foundation	United Kingdom	London	$13.2 billion	£9.8 billion	1958	
21	Church Commissioners for England	United Kingdom	London	$12.4 billion	£9.2 billion	1948	
22	Stavros Niarchos Foundation	Greece	Athens	$12 billion		1996	
23	Kamehameha Schools	United States	Honolulu	$11.5 billion		1887	
24	Robert Wood Johnson Foundation	United States	Princeton, New Jersey	$11.4 billion		1972	
25	J. Paul Getty Trust	United States	Los Angeles	$10.4 billion		1982	
26	Mohammed bin Rashid Al Maktoum Foundation	United Arab Emirates	Dubai	$10.1 billion	AED37 billion	2007	
27	Gordon and Betty Moore Foundation	United States	Palo Alto, California	$9.5 billion		2000	
28	Margaret A. Cargill Philanthropies	United States	Minneapolis	$9.2 billion	USD9.2 billion	1991	
29	Li Ka Shing Foundation	Hong Kong	Hong Kong	$8.3 billion	HK$64.4 billion	1980	
30	The Leona M. and Harry B. Helmsley Charitable Trust	United States	New York City	$8.3 billion		1999	
31	W. K. Kellogg Foundation Trust	United States	Battle Creek, Michigan	$8.2 billion		1930	
32	Jacobs Foundation	Switzerland	Zürich	$7.6 billion	CHF7 billion	2001	
33	Michael & Susan Dell Foundation	United States	West Lake Hills, Texas	$7.5 billion		1999	
34	Else Kröner-Fresenius-Stiftung	Germany	Bad Homburg	$7 billion	€6.2 billion	1983	
35	David and Lucile Packard Foundation	United States	Los Altos, California	$6.3 billion		1964	
36	Rockefeller Foundation	United States	New York City	$6.3 billion		1913	
37	Andrew W. Mellon Foundation	United States	New York City	$6.2 billion		1969	
38	John D. and Catherine T. MacArthur Foundation	United States	Chicago	$6 billion		1970	
39	Robert Bosch Foundation	Germany	Stuttgart	$6 billion	€5.3 billion	1964	
40	Children's Investment Fund Foundation	United Kingdom	London	$5.9 billion	£5.2 billion	2002	
41	Conrad N. Hilton Foundation	United States	Westlake Village, California	$5.9 billion		1944	
42	Nemours Foundation	United States	Jacksonville	$4.6 billion		1936	
43	Bloomberg Philanthropies	United States	New York City	$4.2 billion		2004	
44	Carnegie Corporation of New York	United States	New York City	$4.1 billion		1911	
45	Mother Cabrini Health Foundation	United States	New York City	$4 billion		2018	
46	Calouste Gulbenkian Foundation	Portugal	Lisbon	$4.0 billion	€3.72 billion	1956	
47	Volkswagen Stiftung	Germany	Hannover	$4 billion	€3.5 billion	1961	
48	Tulsa Community Foundation	United States	Tulsa	$3.8 billion		1998	
49	The Kresge Foundation	United States	Troy, Michigan	$3.6 billion		1924	
50	California Health Care Foundation	United States	Oakland, California	$3.6 billion		1996	
51	The Duke Endowment	United States	Charlotte	$3.4 billion		1924	
52	Fondation de France	France	Paris	$3.3 billion	€2.8 billion	1969	[50]
53	Realdania	Denmark	Copenhagen	$3.2 billion	€2.8 billion	2000	
54	Cleveland Foundation	United States	Cleveland	$2.8 billion		1914	
53	Greater Kansas City Community Foundation	United States	Kansas City	$2.7 billion		1978	
54	Simons Foundation	United States	New York City	$2.6 billion		1994	
55	Fundus Heritage	Monaco	Monte Carlo	$1.2 billion		1923	

== See also ==
- List of charitable foundations
- List of wealthiest religious organizations
