= Heritage Museums and Gardens =

Museum and public garden in Sandwich, Massachusetts, US

Coordinates: 41°44′51.76″N 70°30′19.97″W

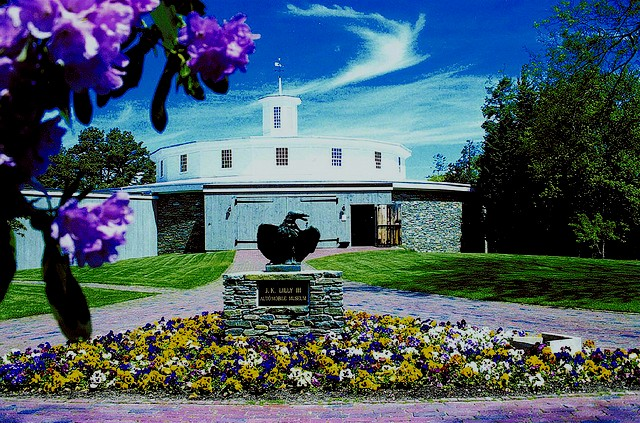
- Website: Official website

Heritage Museums and Gardens (100 acres), formerly the Heritage Plantation of Sandwich, is located at 67 Grove Street, Sandwich, Massachusetts. The public garden, with its nationally significant collection of rhododendrons hybridized by Charles Dexter, over 1,000 varieties of daylilies and extensive hosta collection, is complemented by three gallery buildings containing a world-class collection of American automobiles, American folk art and a working 1919 carousel and rare carousel figures.

The museum's grounds were once the estate of noted rhododendron hybridizer Charles O. Dexter, where between 1921 and 1943 Dexter developed between 5,000 and 10,000 seedlings annually. He planted many on the site. In 1969, Josiah K. Lilly III (1916–1995) and his wife established Heritage Plantation of Sandwich on the property.

== Attractions ==
=== The gardens and grounds ===
The gardens' principal interest is its collection of thousands of rhododendrons, which now include 125 of the 145 known Dexter cultivars. Their typical bloom time is from Memorial Day Weekend to mid-June. This collection has been painstakingly recovered since 1972, as Dexter's own named cultivars had been scattered without records. Each cultivar had to be recollected from gardens and nurseries up and down the East Coast. The site was prepared in 1972, and by the summer of 1977 it included over 300 plants representing nearly 100 cultivars, with an additional 25 cultivars as small plants in the nursery. All are now mature plantings.

Other items of horticultural interest include holly, daylily, herb, hosta, and heather gardens, as well as more than a thousand varieties of trees, shrubs and flowers, many labeled.

The grounds also include the Old East Mill, a windmill built in Orleans, Massachusetts in 1800 and extensively restored in 1999–2000. Visitors may view its interior on special days. In 2002 a labyrinth was added to the grounds, designed by Marty Cain, one of the best-known labyrinth designers in North America. The Hart Family Maze Garden was established on the grounds in 2005, and a Cape Cod Hydrangea garden was added in the fall of 2008. For children and families, Hidden Hollow was added in 2010. It is a Certified Outdoor Nature Classroom where children and families can rediscover the joy of being outside together.

In 2015, an adventure park was added on the grounds, after much opposition from neighbors.

=== 1908 Charles Looff Carousel ===
Heritage Museums & Gardens owns an original 1908 Looff Carousel made at Loof's factory in Riverside, Rhode Island. The carousel was originally made for an amusement park in Meridian, Mississippi. The carousel changed hands a few times starting in the 1950s, and was purchased by Heritage Museums & Gardens founder Josiah Lilly in 1968. A special building was constructed for the carousel, which was opened to the public in 1972.

The museum celebrated the 110th birthday of the carousel in September 2018 with a ceremony attended by two of Charles Looff’s descendants.

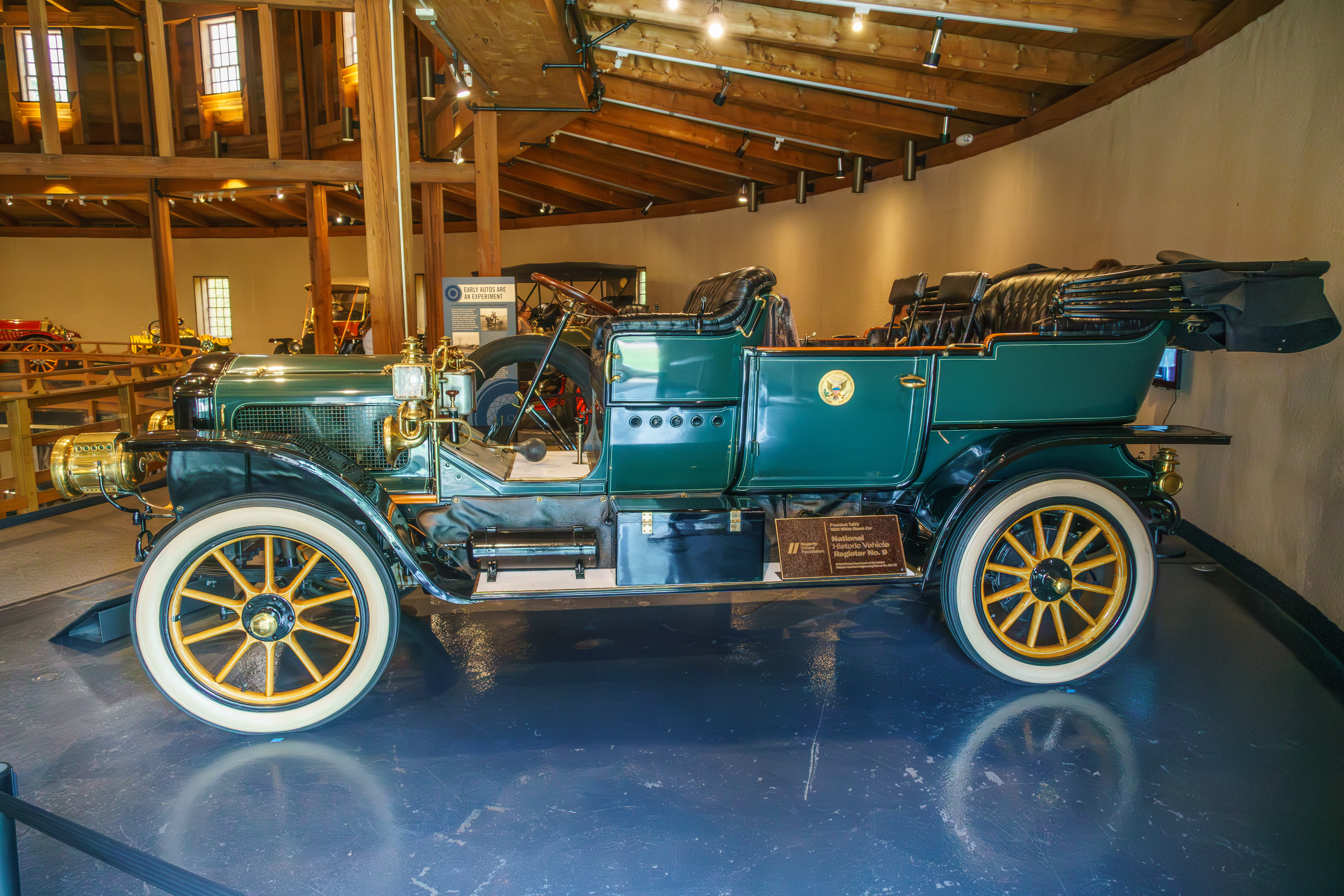
Taft's 1909 White Steam Car at the Automobile Museum at Heritage Museums and Gardens

=== William Howard Taft's automobile ===
In 1909, president William Howard Taft converted the White House stables into a garage and purchased four automobiles, including a White Motor Company Steam Car Model M. This $4,000 car was one of the last steam cars produced and proved a favorite of the President who used bursts of steam against "pesky" press photographers. The 40 hp (30 kW) White Model M 7-seat tourer generated favorable press for the newly formed White Motor Company. Taft's White Model M is currently housed in the collection at the J.K. Lilly III Automobile Museum at Heritage Museums and Gardens.
