= Lilly Endowment =

Private philanthropic foundation since 1937

Lilly Endowment Inc.
- Founded: 1937; 89 years ago
- Founder: Josiah K. Lilly Sr. and sons, Eli Jr., and Josiah (Joe) Jr.
- Purpose: Religion; Education; Community development Indianapolis; Indiana
- Location: Indianapolis, Indiana, U.S.
- Method: Grants
- Key people: Clay Robbins (chairman and CEO)
- Revenue: $929 million (2020)
- Expenses: $822 million (2020)
- Endowment: 9.8% Lilly Endowments (2026)
- Website: www.lillyendowment.org

Lilly Endowment Inc., headquartered in Indianapolis, Indiana, is one of the world's largest private philanthropic foundations and among the largest endowments in the United States. It was founded in 1937 by Josiah K. (J. K.) Lilly Sr. and his sons, Eli Jr. and Josiah Jr. (Joe), with an initial gift of Eli Lilly and Company stock valued at $280,000 USD ($4,616,759 in 2015 chained dollars). As of 2025, its total assets were $106 billion.

== Charitable focus ==
The Lilly Endowment has historically focused on three primary grant areas: community development, education, and Christianity. It is known as the most influential philanthropy in its home city and state. Its funding of projects related to religion is unusually large among foundations. It has given to some politically and religiously conservative causes, especially in the 1960s.

J. K. Lilly Sr. initially served on the foundation board and became its largest contributor. Over time, he donated Eli Lilly and Company stock worth a total of $86.8 million to the foundation, including a $30 million bequest following his death in 1948. J. K.'s sons, Eli and Joe, contributed additional Eli Lilly and Company stock that had a combined value of $6.8 million. Eli also managed the foundation in its early years. The Lilly Endowment's first full-time staff members, Josiah K. Lilly III and G. Harold Duling, were hired in 1951. By the mid-1970s, the foundation staff had increased to 75 and it had moved to larger headquarters at 2801 North Meridian Street in Indianapolis.

The endowment enabled the Lilly family to keep control of the company and continue their charitable giving without major income tax and inheritance tax penalties. As required under the Tax Reform Act of 1969, the Lilly Endowment diversified its holdings, but its assets consist primarily of Eli Lilly and Company stock. In 1998, the Lilly Endowment became the wealthiest philanthropic endowment in the world in terms of assets (estimated value of $15.4 billion) and charitable giving. In 2019, it was the second-largest private American foundation, behind the Bill & Melinda Gates Foundation. As of 2023, it has remained so.

The private family foundation is a separate entity from the Eli Lilly and Company pharmaceutical firm, and maintains its headquarters in a different location. With the exception of the Eli Lilly and Company stock that the foundation holds in its portfolio, the Lilly Endowment is not linked to the Lilly pharmaceutical company. The nonprofit foundation has its own board of directors to manage its affairs and an executive committee (trustees) that reviews grant requests.

== Recipients ==
In its history since 1937, the Lilly Endowment has given a total of more than $10 billion to more than 10,000 groups. Although it has provided gifts with a national and global reach, the Lilly Endowment's primary geographic focus has been in Indianapolis and in Indiana. Early recipients include the Indianapolis Community Chest, a forerunner of the United Way, the Children's Museum of Indianapolis, Christ Church Cathedral, among other Protestant and, later, Catholic institutions in the state, and several Indiana colleges and universities, such as Wabash College and Earlham College. Other major gifts helped to fund construction projects in downtown Indianapolis, including the Indiana Convention Center, the Hoosier Dome (the city's first domed stadium), and restoration of several of the city's historic buildings, including the Hilbert Circle Theater, the Indiana Theater, and grants to construct the Indianapolis Zoo, Eiteljorg Museum of American Indians and Western Art, and sports facilities on the Indiana University – Purdue University Indianapolis campus and elsewhere in the city. It has been a major source of matching grants for civic and arts groups. Since 1987, the Lilly Endowment's Giving Indiana Funds for Tomorrow (GIFT) initiative has funded starting and growing Indiana community foundations.

From its inception the Lilly Endowment has supported numerous religious endeavors. These include the Christ Church Cathedral in Indianapolis. J. K. Lilly Sr. was involved with the church throughout his life, beginning as a choirboy. Upon Lilly's death, a stipulation of his bequest to the church was that it remain in the heart of downtown Indianapolis. Lilly supported a wide variety of religious endeavors, which he considered an important means of promoting character development.

Institutions and programs funded by Lilly grants have included:

- 1966: The Youth Ministry project ($50,000)
- 1974: Readiness for Ministry for the Association of Theological Schools
- 1976–82: The introduction of the Readiness for Ministry program to Association of Theological Schools seminaries
- 1981: Study of Early Adolescents and Their Parents ($273,000)
- 1988: Effective Christian Education: A National Study of Protestant Congregations
- 1999–2002: Programs for the Theological Exploration of Vocation - eighty-eight colleges and universities received a total of $136.5 million to establish or strengthen programs that assisted students in examining the relationship between faith and vocational choices, provided opportunities for gifted young people to explore Christian ministry, and enhanced the capacity of school faculty and staff to effectively teach and mentor students
- 2003: Emory University's Youth Theological Initiative (under the university's Candler School of Theology), a center for research and theological youth education that has become a model for such programs across the nation ($2,182,200 over four years)
- 2010: Manchester University (formerly Manchester College) received $35 million from the Lilly Endowment to establish its College of Pharmacy at the school's Fort Wayne, Indiana, campus; it is the state's third school of pharmacy, the inaugural class was enrolled in the fall of 2012 and was graduated in the spring of 2016
- 2019: Religion News Foundation's Global Religion Journalism Initiative to expand news reporting on religion around the world. It is funded by an 18-month, $4.9 million grant from Lilly Endowment and is a collaborative effort among the Associated Press (AP), Religion News Service (RNS), and The Conversation US (TCUS). The grant represents one of the largest investments in religion journalism in decades. The initiative will create a joint global religion news desk to improve general understanding, analyze the significance of developments in the world of faith, and explain religious practices and principles that underlie current events and cultural movements.
- On January 17, 2022, the endowment announced through the National Trust for Historic Preservation, a 20 million dollar donation to the African American Cultural Heritage Action Fund as seed funding for the Preserving Black Churches Project. The National Trust was launching the fund on behalf of the donor and the release was timed to coincide with the celebration of Dr. Martin Luther King Jr. Day.
- In April 2022, the endowment pledged $25 million to the Central Indiana Community Foundation (CICF) in an effort to support the underappreciated communities within the city of Indianapolis while supporting overall city infrastructure.
- On January 9, 2024, Purdue University announced accepting a combined $100 million donation from the Lilly Endowment, split evenly between the Purdue Computes initiative and the Daniels School of Business. The donation is the largest in Purdue's history.
- In January 2024, The United Negro College Fund (UNCF) received a significant donation of $100 million from the Lilly Endowment Inc. The objective of this donation is to increase the unrestricted endowment for each of UNCF's 37 member institutions by $10 million, or a total of $370 million. This donation is the single largest unrestricted gift to the UNCF since its founding 80 years ago.
- In August 2024, the Lilly Endowment donated $100 million to the National Park Foundation to support more than 400 national park sites.
- In December 2025, the Lilly Endowment donated $50.8 million to the University of Notre Dame to fund a faith-based ethical framework to discern appropriate uses for AI.

Other Lilly Endowment beneficiaries have included:

- The Rockefeller-funded and ecumenical Association of Theological Schools
- Search Institute, a psychology-based, not-for-profit, ecumenical youth research organization supported by grants and contracts from foundations, corporations, and government agencies proceeds from the sales of products and services, and tax-deductible contributions from individuals and organizations
- The ecumenical Christian Church (Disciples of Christ) congregations, whose Bethany Project was formed to revitalize congregations by patterning its ministry after Charles E. Fuller, the father of New Evangelicalism
- The Hudson Institute, a conservative nonprofit think tank
- The Pacific Research Institute, a California-based free-market think tank that has opposed government health care interventions ($175,000 a year starting in 2015)
- The Federalist Society ($1.5 million in a decade), conservative law group
- Climate change denial efforts

== Art collection ==
Over the years, the Lilly Endowment has acquired a collection of important Indiana paintings that were in danger of leaving the state, including works by William Merritt Chase, John Elwood Bundy, and members of the Hoosier Group. The works of art are generally displayed at the endowment offices on North Meridian Street in Indianapolis.

== See also ==
- Eli Lilly
- Hudson Institute
- Indianapolis Art Center
- List of wealthiest foundations
