= Indiana Historical Society =

State historical society in Indiana, United States

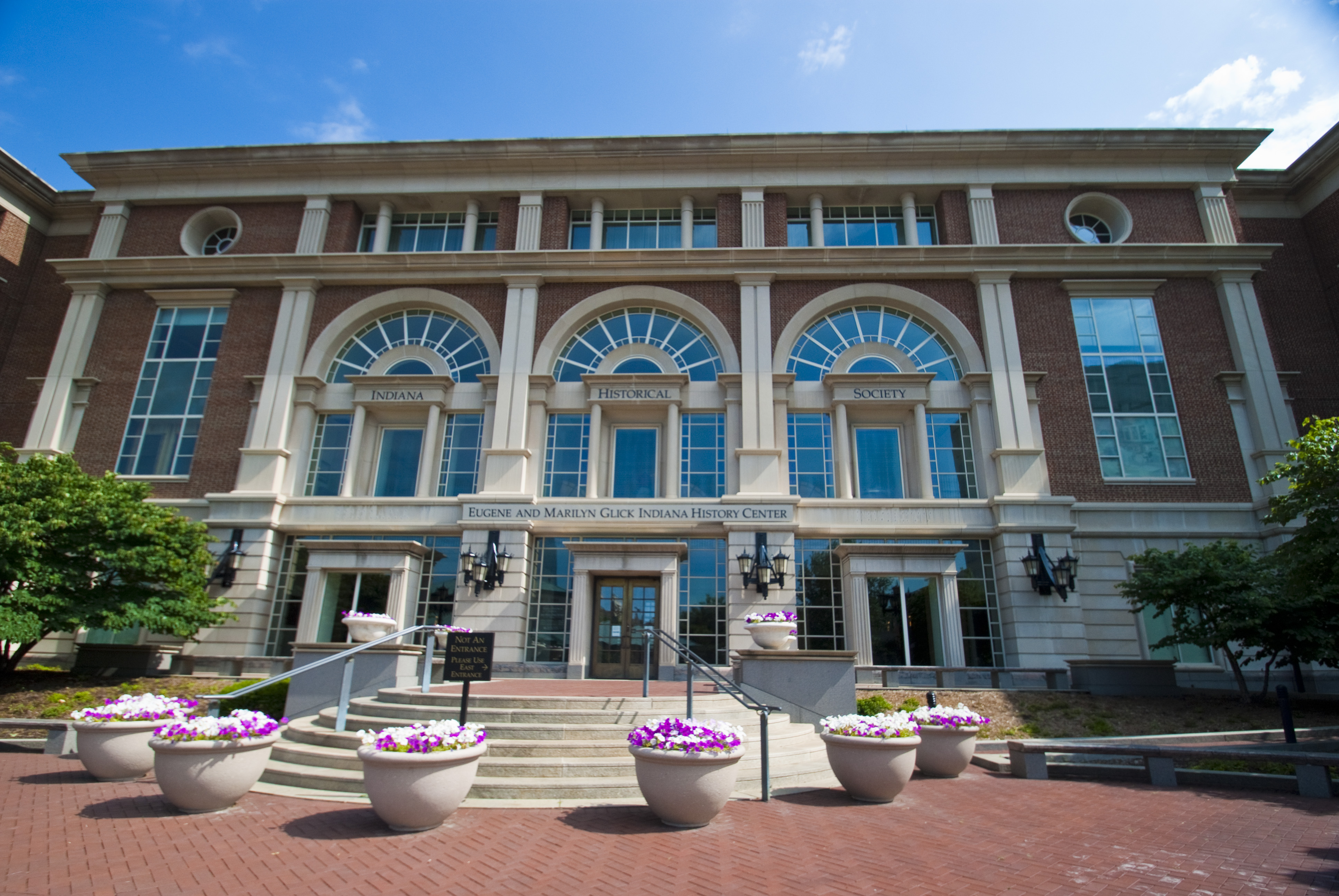
- Indiana Historical Society, housed in the Eugene and Marilyn Glick Indiana History Center.
- Abbreviation: IHS
- Formation: December 11, 1830; 195 years ago
- Purpose: Collect, preserve and share the history of Indiana
- Headquarters: Eugene and Marilyn Glick Indiana History Center
- Location(s): 450 West Ohio St. Indianapolis, Indiana
- Coordinates: 39°46′13.5″N 86°09′58″W
- Members: 7,500 households
- President and CEO: Jody Blankenship
- Board of directors: 31 members
- Publication: Traces of Indiana and Midwestern History; The Hoosier Genealogist: Connections
- Affiliations: Smithsonian, American Alliance of Museums, American Association for State and Local History
- Staff: 96
- Website: www.indianahistory.org

The Indiana Historical Society (IHS) is one of the United States' oldest and largest historical societies. It describes itself as "Indiana's Storyteller".

It is housed in the Eugene and Marilyn Glick Indiana History Center at 450 West Ohio Street in Indianapolis, Indiana, in The Canal and White River State Park Cultural District, neighboring the Indiana State Museum and the Eiteljorg Museum of American Indian and Western Art. In 2019, the center hosted 112,732 visitors. The Indiana Historical Society is the oldest state historical society west of the Allegheny Mountains.

A private, nonprofit membership organization founded in 1830, the IHS maintains a research library and archives on the history of Indiana and the Old Northwest. The IHS also provides support and assistance to local museums and historical groups, publishes books and periodicals; sponsors teacher workshops; and provides youth, adult, and family programming, including Indiana's participation in the National History Day Competition series. Finally, it is responsible for appointing and training the state's 92 county historians. The Indiana Historical Society opened a new 165,000-square-foot (15,300 m^{2}) headquarters in downtown Indianapolis in July 1999, built on the site of the prior Holy Trinity Greek Orthodox Church of Indianapolis.

== History ==
The Indiana Historical Society was started on December 11, 1830, which was the fourteenth anniversary of the statehood of Indiana (December 11, 1816). A group of Indianapolis-area leaders sought to obtain objects relating to Indiana's history. Its purpose was to hold a "collection of all materials calculated to shed light on the natural, civil, and political history of Indiana, the promotion of useful knowledge and the friendly and profitable intercourse of such citizens of the state as are disposed to promote the aforesaid objects". The headquarters of the Indiana Historical Society has remained in Indianapolis.

In 1831, the Indiana General Assembly granted the IHS a charter. In the years following, two of the IHS's prevalent backers died, and between its founding in 1830 and 1886, only twelve annual meetings were held to promote the organization. Its collections were located in the old Indiana State Bank and old Indiana State Capitol. The IHS of those days was described by a historian as "a small private club for publishing local history".

In 1886, the IHS was reorganized under the direction of Jacob Piatt Dunn. With trusted associates, Dunn started the policy of annual meetings of the society that continue to this day. Dunn was able to enthuse Hoosiers of various occupations to gather resources for the society, focusing on editors, professional historians, lawyers, librarians, and writers. However, Dunn's attempt to allow women to join the society failed in 1888; it would not be until 1906 that a woman, editor Eliza Browning, would be admitted. Also thanks to Dunn, the Indiana Historical Society had an office at the state capitol building from 1888 to 1914.

The Indiana Historical Society continued to affect and be affected by the activities of the Indiana Historical Bureau (originally the Indiana Historical Commission), the Indiana State Museum, and the Indiana State Library. The IHS's executive secretaries also acted as directors of the Historical Bureau for over fifty years, from 1924 to 1976. This connection allowed the Indiana History Bulletin, controlled by the Historical Bureau, to be distributed to the members of the society. Members of the time also received a publication of Indiana University entitled Indiana Magazine of History.

The bequest of philanthropist Delavan Smith in 1922 of a large sum of money and a sizable collection of books allowed the IHS to start its William Henry Smith Memorial Library. During the 1940s, Howard Henry Peckham was the director of the IHS and established many professional standards in the field of public history.

Beginning in the 1950s, the Indiana Historical Society started publishing works related to the history of Indiana. The most important of these works was the 1966 multi-volume set on the history of Indiana, in celebration of the sesquicentennial (150th) anniversary of Indiana's statehood. Other notable works included the Pulitzer Prize-winning The Old Northwest in 1950. In 2009, the IHS celebrated the 20th anniversary of its award-winning popular history magazine, Traces of Indiana and Midwestern History. It also publishes the family history magazine, The Hoosier Genealogist: Connections, and a membership magazine, IN Perspective.

By 1970, the membership of the Indiana Historical Society had reached 5,000 members. The most noted of these was Eli Lilly, a longtime trustee, whose donations funded additional building additions in 1976. Lilly's bequest allowed the IHS to achieve its own identity with its offices and library occupying a floor in the addition. Also at this time, the IHS and Indiana Historical Bureau leadership was separated with the creation of the title of Executive Secretary being retained for the IHS leadership. By 1993, the membership had risen to 10,000, with forty percent of the society's members living in the Indianapolis metropolitan area.

For years, the headquarters was in the Indiana State Library and Historical Building, but in 1999 it moved to its current headquarters. The 165,000-square-foot (15,300 m^{2}) building includes the 300-seat Frank and Katrina Basile Theater, the William Henry Smith Memorial Library, a vault to house the IHS's collections, the Stardust Terrace Cafe, conservation and preservation imaging facilities, classrooms, the Basile History Market, the Cole Porter Room, Eli Lilly Hall, and various exhibition spaces.

=== Eugene and Marilyn Glick Indiana History Center ===
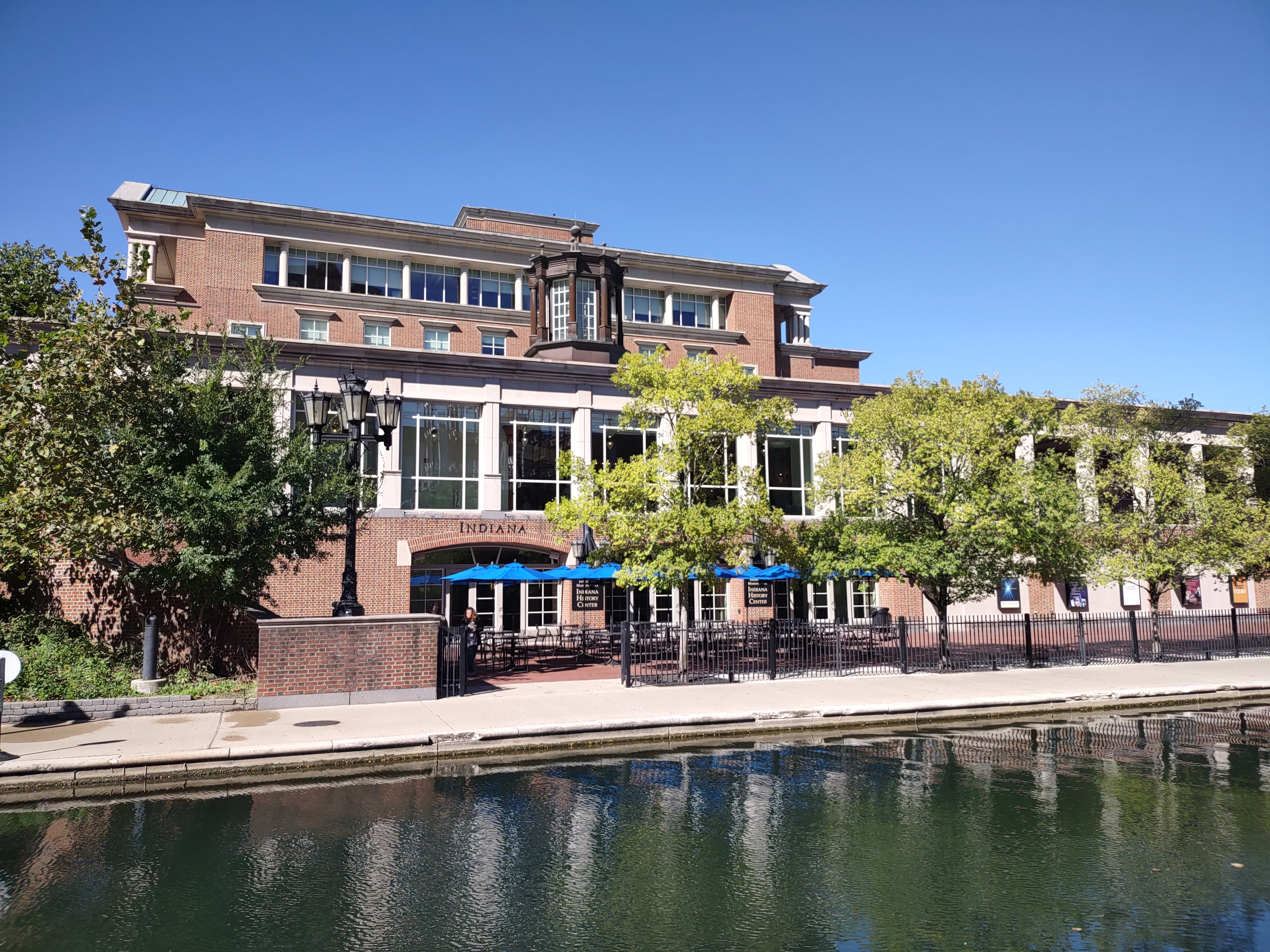
Canal side of the Eugene and Marilyn Glick Indiana History Center in 2024

In December 2007, the IHS launched its Campaign for the Indiana Experience and renamed the building the Eugene and Marilyn Glick Indiana History Center in honor of the Glicks' gift to the campaign. The History Center underwent renovations in 2009 and reopened with new program offerings in the spring of 2010.

The Indiana Experience now includes "You Are There!", an exhibit exploring various photos and documents in the IHS collection through "living history", the use of costumed historical interpreters to take visitors back in time and allow them to interact with history. Past exhibits include the history of organizations such as the Eli Lilly pharmaceutical company, L. S. Ayres department store, and the Ball jar company, as well as more personal glimpses into the lives of individuals in Indiana during the Civil War, World War II, and the civil rights movement. The Indiana Experience also features The Cole Porter Room, a space dedicated to the life and legacy of the famous Indiana composer. The exhibit includes personal items belonging to Cole Porter, including the Tony Award he won for Kiss Me, Kate, and a singer who performs a variety of Cole Porter songs upon request. Current exhibits are published on the IHS website.

== Operations ==
A 31-member board of trustees oversees the operation of the Indiana Historical Society, which includes a staff of approximately 96 people. There are a number of functional divisions within the IHS, including Administration, Collections, Conservation, Development, Publications, Marketing, and Education & Community Engagement. The organization continues to oversee actions that collect, preserve, interpret, and share the history of Indiana.

The current president and CEO of the Indiana Historical Society is Jody Blankenship. He was appointed by the board of trustees in January 2019. The official membership of the IHS includes approximately 4,500 households across the United States.

== Collection ==
The IHS's collections, accessible online through the society's website and at the William Henry Smith Memorial Library, is one of the largest archival repositories of material on the history of Indiana and the Old Northwest. The collection is composed of 1.7 million photographs (615 visual collections), 45,000 cataloged printed items (books, pamphlets, etc.), 14,000 pieces of sheet music, 5,450 processed manuscript collections, 3,300 artifacts, 1,700 cataloged maps, 800 broadsides, and 129 paintings. More than 70,000 digital images representing 61 collections are currently available through the IHS website.

Among the items held by the society is a 130-year-old Bible used in 2008 to swear in Mayor Greg Ballard of Indianapolis. One of the most significant items in the IHS's collection is the original glass-plate negative of an Abraham Lincoln photograph taken by Alexander Gardner just weeks before the Gettysburg Address; this image was used as the model for the creation of the Lincoln Memorial in Washington D.C.

Subject strengths of the IHS's collection (especially as they relate to Indiana and the Old Northwest) include architecture, agriculture, American Civil War, business, communities, education, ethnically and racially identified groups, families, government, journalism and communications, medicine, military affairs, notable Hoosiers, Old Northwest Territory, organized labor, politics, the professions, religion, social services, transportation (including railroad and interurban history), and women.

== Conservation ==
The Indiana Historical Society hosts a conservation lab for its paper-based collections that provides a variety of specialized treatments. These treatments promote the long-term stability of the collections through stabilization techniques, cleanings, and repairs. Staff of the conservation lab also implement preventive measures to preserve collections; this includes ensuring the correct storage of items and proving customized housings for materials, monitoring the storage environment, implementing an integrated pest management plan, and maintaining a disaster recovery plan.

== See also ==
- List of U.S. state historical societies and museums
- List of attractions and events in Indianapolis
- List of historical societies in Indiana

== Sources ==
- In Memory of Howard Henry Peckham (PDF). The Quatro. 1995. Archived from the original (PDF) on October 29, 2015.
