= 124th Ohio Infantry Regiment =

- Active: January 1, 1863, to July 9, 1865
- Country: United States
- Allegiance: Union
- Branch: Infantry
- Engagements: Tullahoma Campaign; Chickamauga Campaign; Battle of Chickamauga; Siege of Chattanooga; Battle of Missionary Ridge; Knoxville Campaign; Atlanta campaign; Battle of Resaca; Battle of Dallas; Battle of New Hope Church; Battle of Allatoona; Battle of Kennesaw Mountain; Battle of Peachtree Creek; Siege of Atlanta; Battle of Jonesboro; Battle of Lovejoy's Station; Battle of Franklin; Battle of Nashville

Insignia
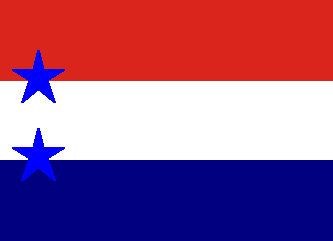
- 2nd Division, XXI Corps

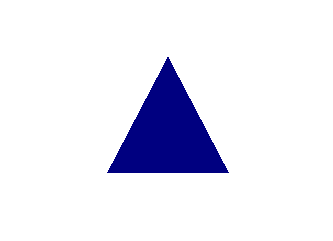
- 3rd Division, IV Corps

The 124th Ohio Infantry Regiment, also known as the 124th Regiment, Ohio Volunteer Infantry (124th OVI), was an infantry regiment in the Union Army during the American Civil War. The regiment was part of the Ohio Volunteer Infantry and played a significant role in several key battles and campaigns throughout the war.

== Service ==
The 124th Ohio Infantry was recruited in the northern counties of Ohio, except for one company from Cincinnati, Company I. It rendezvoused at Camp Taylor outside Cleveland, Ohio, and mustered in for three years service on January 1, 1863, under the command of Colonel Oliver Hazard Payne.

On Thursday, January 1, 1863, 750 men of the regiment marched into Cleveland and entrained there on the Cleveland, Columbus and Cincinnati Railroad (CC&C) to Cincinnati. The regiment crossed the Ohio River, and took four railroads, the Covington and Lexington Railroad (C&LRR), Lexington & Frankfort (Lex&FRR), Louisville & Frankfort (L&FRR), and Louisville and Nashville (L&NRR) to Elizabethtown, KY, assigned to the Department of the Ohio staying until January 31, when it was ordered back to Louisville. There, after a few days and reassigned to the Army of Kentucky, it boarded steamboats in company with 20,000 other troops. After a ten-day transit, the force disembarked near Nashville, TN, entering on Tuesday, February 10.

=== First time at Franklin ===
From Nashville, the 124th Ohio Marched to Franklin, TN, arriving there February 21. Assigned to the Department of the Ohio, it served garrison duty there until June. While there it built the fortifications and defenses that would later see action in November 1864. Franklin served as the regiment's camp of instruction; perfecting its drill, and getting itself into proper shape for the battle-field. Franklin was the county seat of Williamson County in central middle Tennessee, approximately 18 mi (28.97 km) south-southwest of Nashville. In the aftermath of Maj. Gen Rosecrans' victory at the Battle of Stones River at the new year, the area was rife with Confederate regular and irregular forces, and their close proximity kept the 124th Ohio and the rest of the garrison strict in its picket discipline and alertness. Frequent skirmishes with these forces gave the regiment valuable combat experience despite its duty in a small garrison. The men of the 124th and the rest of the garrison were commanded by Col. Charles Champion Gilbert who had been criticized for his slow action at the repulse of Gen. Braxton Bragg's invasion of Kentucky at Perryville despite checking the last rebel attacks and successfully counterattacking. The garrison soon developed a low opinion of him, as had the men in his corps at Perryville, and despised him as a martinet.

Reports of Confederate activity further southwest near Columbia, led Gilbert to order Col. John Coburn to plan a reconnaissance in force there. On Wednesday, March 4, Coburn led a reinforced infantry brigade down the Columbia Turnpike toward Columbia. (Note: The force included the 33rd and 85th Indiana, the 19th Michigan, the 124th, and the 22nd Wisconsin infantry regiments. The screen included detachments from the 4th Kentucky, 2nd Michigan, and 9th Pennsylvania cavalry regiments. Its fire support was the 18th Independent Battery, Ohio Light Artillery.) Four (4 mi (6.44 km)) miles short of Spring Hill, Coburn made contact on his right with, a Confederate Army force composed of two regiments who were driven back.

The 124th was in the rear along the turnpike to Franklin guarding the brigade's ammunition train. Coburn's brigade had made contact with a much larger Confederate cavalry corps under Maj. Gen. Earl Van Dorn. Suspecting he might be facing a larger force, Coburn sent word back to Gilbert who sent back an order for to advance and engage the enemy, intimating that Coburn was a coward. Meanwhile, his men on the line and in the fog of battle, elated at this seeming success, pushed on to Thompson's Station, 8 miles (13 km) from Franklin. Here they met the main Rebel force in much superior numbers, strongly posted behind stone walls. Dorn seized the initiative. Brig. Gen. Jackson's dismounted 2nd Division made a frontal attack, while Brig. Gen. Forrest's division swept around Coburn's left flank, and into his rear. A battle ensued, lasting two hours, the ground being stubbornly contested. After three attempts, Jackson carried the Coburn's hilltop position as Forrest attacked Coburn's wagon train and cut the 124th off from the rest of the brigade blocking Coburn's line of retreat.

Out of ammunition and surrounded, Coburn surrendered, along with all but two of his field officers. Only eleven men from the infantry force returned to Franklin. The 124th's bold front it presented to the enemy enabled the ammunition train and artillery to get safely off the field and back to the fortifications at Franklin.

The regiment saw no further combat during their stay at Franklin but suffered severely from disease endemic to the volunteer army of the time. Through all the suffering, the 124th, in its outnumbered garrison stood in line of battle one hour before daybreak each morning for two hours. The resulting inactivity during these watches chilled and weakened the bodies of the men.

=== Joining the Army of the Cumberland and the Tullahoma campaign ===
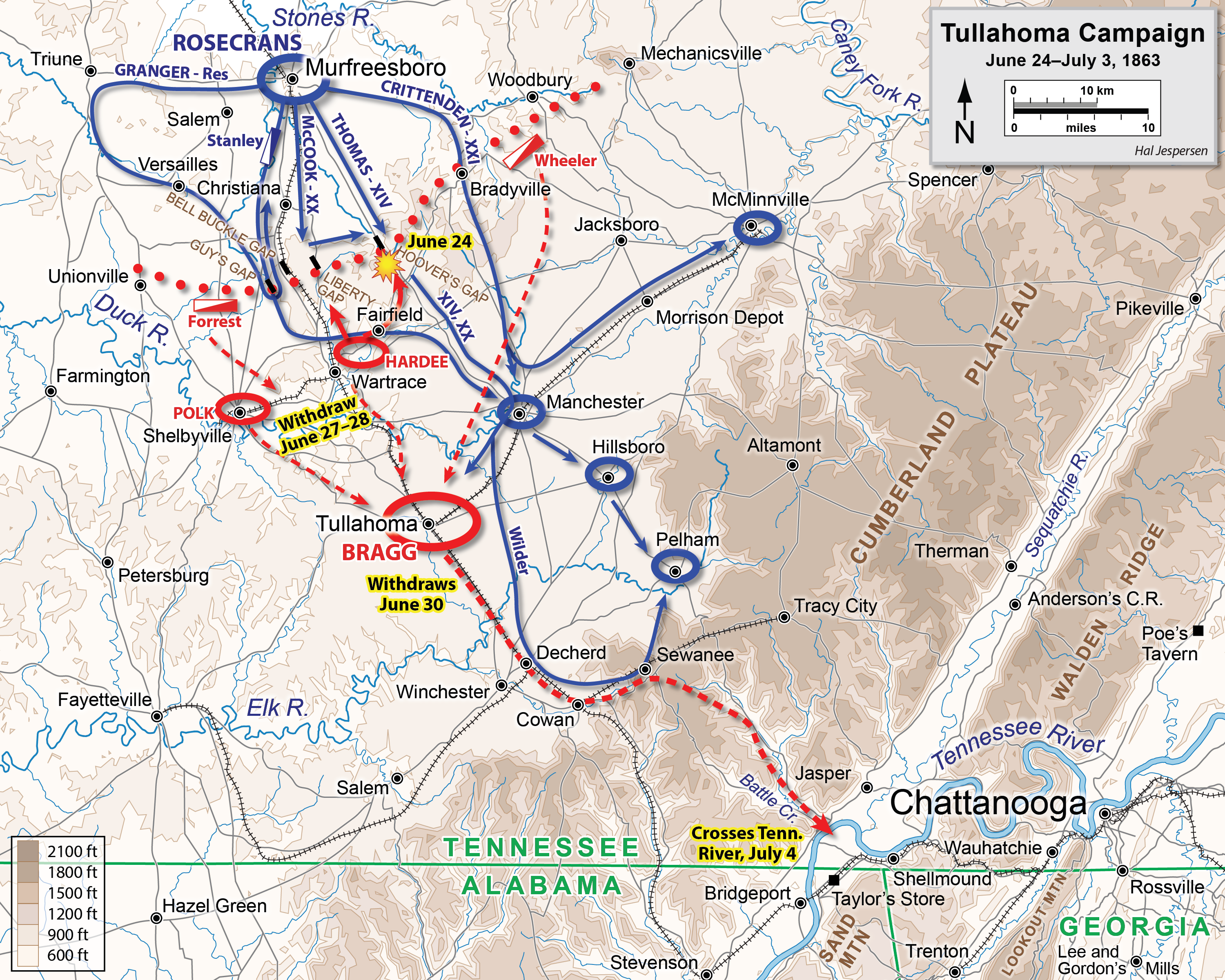
Tullahoma campaign Confederate Union

On Tuesday, June 2, 1863, the garrison was reassigned to Rosecrans' Army of the Cumberland (AoC). A patrol from the regiment had a small skirmish in the morning near Thompson's station, but suffered no casualties. That afternoon, the small garrison abandoned the camp at Franklin that day, and after marching all day Wednesday pitched camp at Triune. The regiment stayed there until dawn Sunday, June 21 when it marched 30 miles (48 km) miles to join Brig. Gen. Hazen's 2nd Brigade (Note: The brigade consisted of 9th Indiana, the 41st and 124th Ohio, and the 6th Kentucky infantry regiments.) under Hazen to Maj. Gen. Palmer's 2nd Division of Maj. Gen. Crittenden's XXI Corps, at Readyville. As part of the Tullahoma Campaign, on Monday, their new brigade marched up into the mountains via Bradyville, TN while Rosecrans seized Hoover's Gap (Note: During the spring, Rosecrans had repeatedly asked for more cavalry resources, which were denied by Washington, but he did receive permission to outfit an infantry brigade as a mounted unit. Col. John T. Wilder's brigade of Maj. Gen. Reynolds' division of Maj. Gen. George H. Thomas'XIV Corps —1,500 men of the 17th and 72nd Indiana regiments and the 98th and 123rd Illinois — found horses and mules in the countryside and armed themselves with long handled hatchets for hand-to-hand combat, which caused their unit to be derisively nicknamed the "Hatchet Brigade". Their more lethal armament were the seven-shot Spencer repeating rifles carried by all the men. Wilder's brigade had the mobility and firepower, but also the high unit morale, necessary to lead the surprise advance on Hoover's Gap before it could be reinforced. They performed even better than expected, and Rosecrans began using them as a corps and army level asset. For more information see their Wikipedia article) to the south. XXI Corps arrived in Manchester on Tuesday, June 23. From there, Hazen made a reconnaissance to south to the Elk River, where the 124th spent July 4, 1864.

On Sunday, July 5, Hazen's brigade returned to Manchester and went into camp. The 124th Ohio enjoyed the lull in the hot summer of 1863 at Manchester in a camp "of great beauty ... praised for its neatness and cleanliness." Supplementing issued rations, the Ohio men "fared sumptuously off the luxuries of Corn and fruit afforded by the farms and orchards arouud them. Cooking utensils were procured and roast dinners became quite common." The Little Duck River passing through Manchester proved a welcome source of clean water coming down from the mountains. The clean water and plentiful diet had a salutary effect on the regiment's overall health, and the sick list became almost obsolete. The drill and discipline of the men were not, however, neglected, and the 124th Ohio soon received praise from inspecting officers for its discipline, cleanliness of arms and clothing, and proficiency in drill. This standing was held by the regiment until muster-out, and was clue to the untiring labors of Col. Payne and Lieut. Col. Pickands.

Tullahoma is considered a "brilliant" campaign and "a model of planning and execution" by many historians. The AoC had driven the rebels out of Middle Tennessee with minimal losses. (Note: Per Tullahoma campaign Wikipedia article - Union casualties were reported as 569 (83 killed, 473 wounded, and 13 captured or missing). Bragg made no casualty report; his losses, he said, were "trifling." But the Union army captured 1,634 Confederates, primarily from Hardee's Corps. As Bragg rode into the Tennessee mountains he told Bishop Charles Quintard, the chaplain of the 1st Tennessee, that he was "utterly broken down" and that the campaign was "a great disaster".)

=== Summer Lull and advance on Chattanooga ===
(August 21 – September 8, 1863)

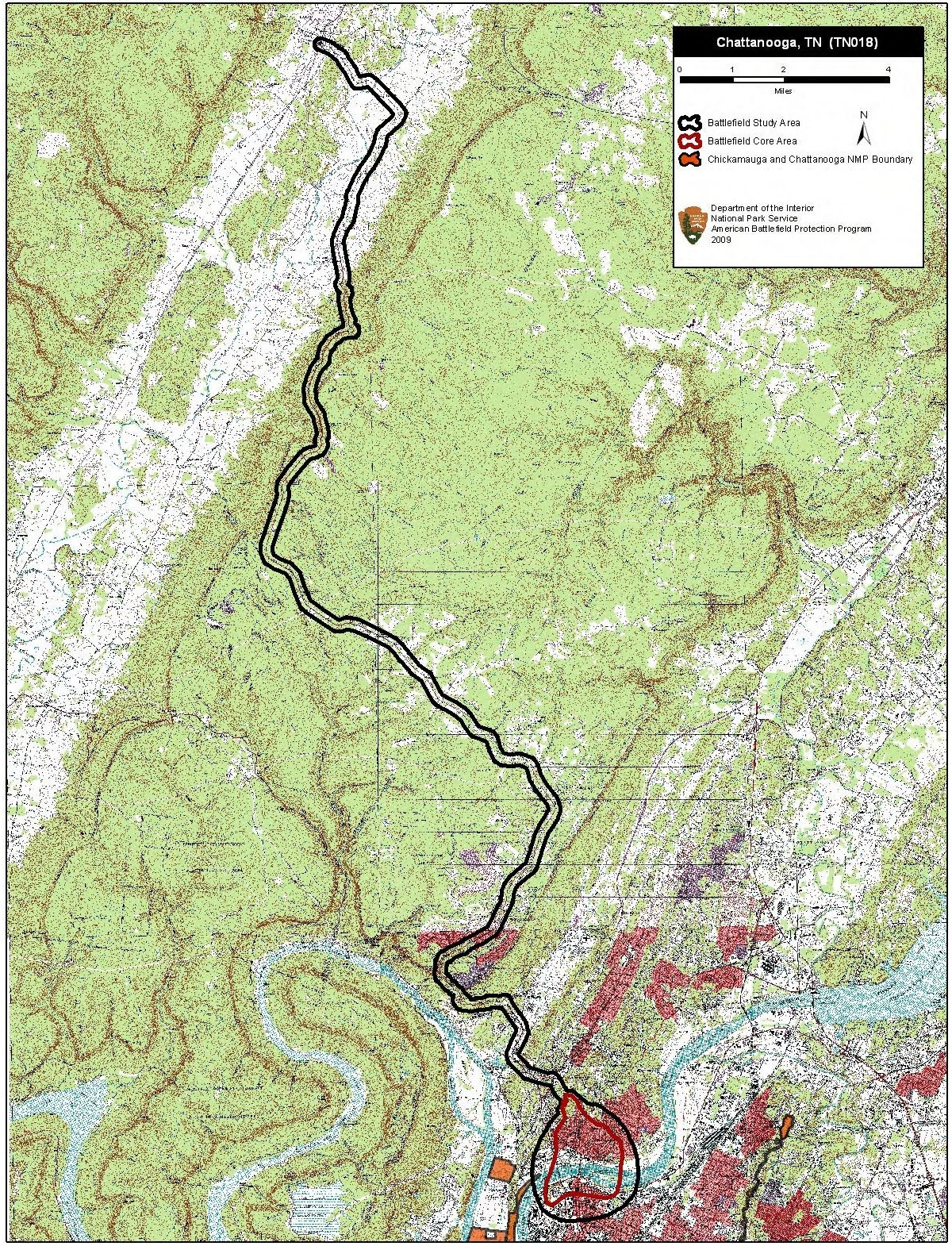
Map of Chattanooga II Battlefield core and study areas by the American Battlefield Protection Program. The Sequatchie Valley is the valley (in white) directly north of Chattanooga running from north northeast to the Tennessee River on the other side of Walden Ridge from Chattanooga.

Rosecrans did not immediately pursue Bragg and instead paused to regroup and study the difficult choices of pursuit into mountainous regions. In mid-August, he would resume campaigning to take Chattanooga, Tennessee, and in the second week, the 124th Ohio received word to get ready to march. His plan was to cross the Cumberland Plateau into the valley of the Tennessee River, pause briefly to accumulate some supplies, and then make an unopposed crossing of the wide river. Due to the successful use of mounted infantry, specifically Col. John T. Wilder's brigade, Rosecrans devised a deception to distract Bragg above Chattanooga while the army crossed downstream. The 124th as part of Hazen's brigade would play a part in the deception.

The 124th Ohio's XXI Corps would advance on the city from the west, while Maj. Gen. Thomas' XIV Corps would cross over Lookout Mountain 20 miles (32 km) south of the city, while Maj. Gen. McCook's XX Corps and Maj. Gen. Stanley's Cavalry Corps would move further southeast threatening Bragg's railroad to Atlanta. If it worked, Rosecrans could cause Bragg to evacuate Chattanooga or be trapped in the city without supplies.

Rosecrans would send the Lightning Brigade and Robert H. G. Minty's cavalry brigade supported by Hazen's and Wagner's infantry brigades ahead of Crittenden's XXI Corps to conduct deception operations along the north bank of the Tennessee River across from Chattanooga. This force's mission was to sprint ahead of Crittenden's Corps toward the Tennessee River. While the 124th Ohio as part of Hazen's brigade held Bragg's cavalry's attention in the valley and Wagner's brigade encamped up on the Cumberland Plateau north northeast of the city, the mounted infantry and cavalry with their supporting artillery would visibly show their presence known along the north side of the river.

The remainder of the corps would spread out across the Cumberland Plateau heading north of Chattanooga, while the Rosecrans' other two corps crossed the river below Chattanooga and Bragg. Once the other corps were safely across the river, the XXI Corps would fall in behind them leaving the four brigades to keep Bragg focused across the river to the north bank. The four brigades would patrol the river, make as much noise as possible, and feign river crossing operations north of the city. That was what Bragg feared most, a crossing north of Chattanooga.

On Sunday. August 16, they struck their tents at Manchester, and marched up over the Cumberland Mountains. After fording a cold river, Tuesday might brought them to the first range of the Cumberland mountains. On Wednesday, the regiment was detailed to assist the wagon train up the steep mountain road, which occupied most of the day. The men spent the night of August 19–20 on the mountain, and "enjoyed a most refreshing sleep in the cool invigorating mountain air." Thursday morning, the 124th Ohio marched down off the ridge into the Sequatchie Valley 6 miles (9.7 km)-8 miles (13 km) from its head. On Friday, August 21, they reached Poe's Tavern and encamped. They had covered about 50 miles (80 km) over rough, wooded, mountainous territory in five days.

The men felt lucky here, as at Manchester. The Poe Branch of North Chickamauga Creek noted, (Note: North Chickamauga Creek begins in an area called The Horseshoe, a portion of Walden Ridge, a branch of the Cumberland Plateau. The creek forms in southeastern Sequatchie County at the confluence of Standifer and Brimer creeks north of the community of Lone Oak, and runs entirely in Tennessee.) "a pure cold stream of water" ran through the town. Again, they supplemented issued rations by living off the land's plentiful harvest of corn, fruit, potatoes, etc. (Note: Per Lewis, "We also found here plenty of corn - just at the roasting-ear period of maturity; and it would surprise you farmers to see how soon a ten-acre field of green corn would be used up·by an army. But how did the boys prepare it so as to make it good and wholesome? Of course, it could be roasted on the ear, but that was too slow a process. By this time, in our experience as soldiers, we had divided into messes of about four. One would carry a small tin pail or kettle, holding about four quarts; another would carry a small frying pan; the third would carry a coffeepot (without which the rebellion could not have been put down); while the fourth would carry some other article necessary to the culinary art. The commissary supplied us with salt pork or bacon, and also with salt and pepper. Now the culinary process is this: the corn is gathered and carefully silked, then with a sharp knife and every soldier was supposed to have one or if left lying about loose) the corn was shaven from the cob, put into the frying pan with a slice of pork or bacon, and cooked until tender; add salt and pepper to suit taste, and you have a dish good enough to set before a union soldier - and too good for a king.")

Meanwhile, other elements of XXI Corps to feint further north and east of Bragg, while moving his other corps west and downriver. Meanwhile, Rosecrans's deception on the river was underway. The Lightning Brigade appeared across from Chattanooga on the northbank. Hazen's brigade, containing the 124th, patrolled up and down the valley. Wagner's brigade patrolled from the plateau down to the river. Minty' cavalry troopers and Wilder's men pounded on tubs and sawed boards, sending pieces of wood downstream, to make the Confederates think that rafts were being constructed for a crossing north of the city. Starting Friday, August 21, Wilder's artillery, commanded by Capt. Eli Lilly, bombarded the city from Stringer's Ridge for a fortnight, an operation sometimes known as the Second Battle of Chattanooga. The deception worked and Bragg was convinced that the Union crossing would be above the city, in conjunction with Burnside's advancing Army of the Ohio from Knoxville.

During these weeks, he stealthily moved the other corps across the Tennessee and began flanking Bragg's left. As Hazen's brigade stayed in the valle, XX Corps crossed at Caperton's Ferry, 4 miles (6.4 km) from Stevenson on Saturday, August 29, building a 1,250 feet (380 m) pontoon bridge there. Most of XIV Corps crossed at Shellmound, Tennessee, on Sunday. Once Thomas and McCook were across, he pulled the XXI Corps and sent them over at Bridgeport. The fourth crossing site was at the mouth of Battle Creek, Tennessee, where the rest of the XIV Corps crossed on August 31. Without permanent bridges, the Army of the Cumberland could not be supplied reliably, so another bridge was constructed at Bridgeport by Maj. Gen. Philip Sheridan's division, spanning 2,700 feet (820 m) in three days. Virtually all of the Union army, other than elements of the Reserve Corps kept behind to guard the railroad, had safely crossed the river by September 4. On the southern side, the AoC began finding more mountainous terrain and road networks that were just as treacherous as the ones they had already traversed. All the AoC, save Hazen's Wagner's Minty's, and Wilder's brigades, were across by Monday September 7.

While all this was going on, the Confederacy, concerned about Bragg's position, took steps to reinforce him. Johnston sent two weak divisions (about 9,000 men) from Mississippi under Maj. Gen. John C. Breckinridge and Maj. Gen. William H. T. Walker by September 4, and General Robert E. Lee dispatched a corps under Lt. Gen. James Longstreet from the Army of Northern Virginia.

On Tuesday, Bragg, who had already decided to abandon the city (Rosecrans' goal) to withdraw to a more defensible position further south, learned from his cavalry that the three corps were across the river to the southwest. At this news, he sped up his withdrawal and marched his Army of Tennessee into Georgia. Bragg's army marched down the LaFayette Road and camped in the city of LaFayette.

=== The Chickamauga campaign ===
Initial movements in the Chickamauga campaign, August 15 – September 8, 1863 Confederate Union

Believing Bragg was fleeing in chaos to Dalton or Rome, Georgia, Rosecrans ordered his diversion force into the city. On Wednesday, Hazen gathered his brigade, and the 124th broke camp. The brigade pushed straight south for Waldron's Ridge finding its ascent tougher than prior climbs had been. As they left the valley, the men could not help thinking of the fate of the valley's poor residents, whose only means of support the brigade had eaten up and destroyed, but realized that the war had become merciless.

By nightfall, the brigade had reached the Tennessee a little less than a mile in width, and in some places quite swift. The men were ordered to remove their clothing, although some regarded the order as more advisory than imperative and trusted the warmth of their bodies to dry them later, so most put their clothing up in neat bundles and bore them on their bayonets. Starting in four ranks, they got on very well until the deep and rapid portion of the river, when some of the short men became very apprehensive, leading the regiment to hold hands to keep from getting swept away by the current downstream.

Once safely across, the 124th spent the night watching the others following them or drying soaked garments. On Thursday afternoon, the regiment camped with its brigade near the river. As the last corps across the river, Crittenden's XXI Corps was spread out occupying a triangle between Chattanooga, Wauhatchie, and Rossville, just across the state line in Georgia. Friday, September 11, the brigade marched southeast through Lookout Mountain in the direction of Ringgold, GA. En route, as a rule, the men noted the local white residents had abandoned their homes and farms. The men noted that the area largely woods, now and then broken by cultivated clearances called deadenings. Some portions of the country were quite level, and then breaking into bluffs, as one left the river and approached the foothills of the mountains. Once through Lookout Mountain, they stopped at Chickamauga Creek and camped. There, they learned the Lightning Brigade, now attached to XXI Corps, had been to Ringgold where it skirmished and drove off rebel cavalry from Forrest's Cavalry Corps.

With rebels at Ringgold on Friday and at Davis's Cross Roads on Saturday, Rosecrans realized that he had narrowly escaped a trap, and he abandoned his pursuit and began to concentrate his scattered forces. As the 124th were with Hazen, on Saturday, September 12, he ordered McCook and the cavalry come back to Stevens Gap to join Thomas, intending for this combined force to continue up Lafayette Road to link up with Crittenden. McCook received his orders on Sunday and instead of marching up the valley, he retraced his route over Lookout Mountain taking three days to march 57 miles (92 km).

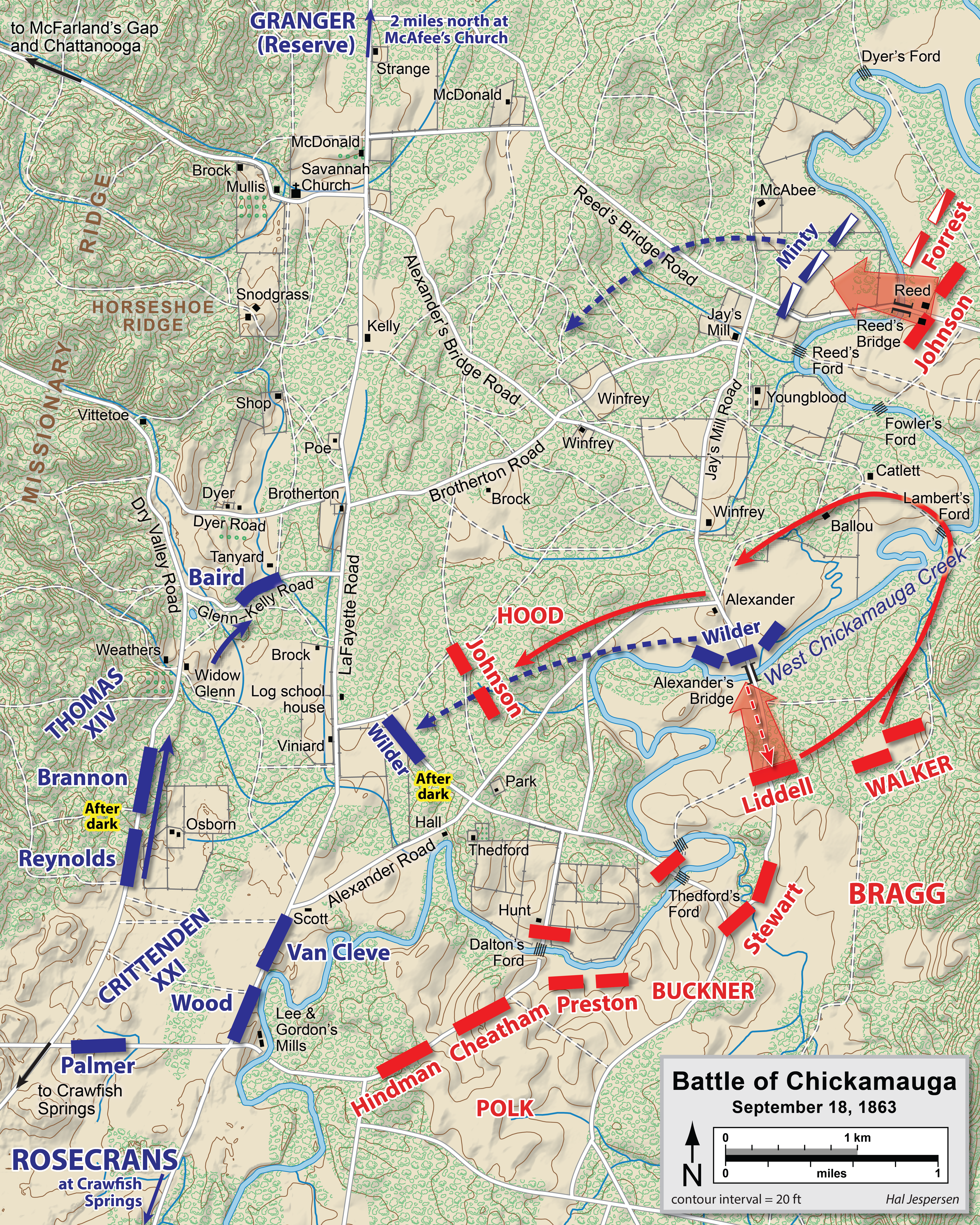
September 18 movements on the eve of the Battle of Chickamauga

On Saturday, September 12, the 124th Ohio marched to Ringold. Midday, Crittenden received Rosecrans' message and began moving from Ringgold toward Lee and Gordon's Mill. The regiment were in the town when the brigade received orders to go to back across the Chickamauga and turn south down Lafayette Road. They headed back to their camp from the night before on the west side of the Chickamauga. Unbeknownst to them, Forrest's cavalry had reported their movement, and Bragg, seeing saw an offensive opportunity, ordered Lt. Gen. Leonidas Polk to attack Crittenden's lead division, under Brig. Gen. Thomas J. Wood, at dawn on Sunday. After hearing no sound of battle at daybreak Bragg soon found that no preparations were being made to attack and despite his anger that his subordinate did not attack as ordered, realized it was too late—all of Crittenden's corps had passed by and concentrated at Lee and Gordon's Mill. On Sunday evening, unaware of the threat, the 124th and its brigade arrived at Lee & Gordon's Mills, GA. The next day, September 14, the regiment, as its brigade was in Palmer's division, moved southwest to make contact with XIV Corps at Pond Spring. After the division stayed in position astride Dry Valley Road until all of XIV Corps passed through to north to the other side of XXI Corps, the 124th with its brigade and division returned to Lee & Gordon's Mill on Friday night, September 18.

All day, as the 124th moved back north, they noted the south bank of the Chickamauga was held by rebel skirmishers. They learned from units they passed that Bragg had been reinforced by Longstreet from Virginia, and Bragg was planning on destroying XIV and XXI Corps before a junction could be made with XX Corps. Shortly after their return to Lee & Gordon's, the whole division was ordered back on the road and headed north on Lafayette Road. (Note: For prior next four days, both armies attempted to improve their dispositions. Rosecrans continued to concentrate his forces, intending to withdraw as a single body to Chattanooga. Bragg, learning of McCook's movement at Alpine, feared the Federals might be planning a double envelopment. At a council of war on September 15, Bragg's corps commanders agreed that an offensive in the direction of Chattanooga offered their best option.CITEREFRobertson,_Blue_&_Gray,_Jun_2006)

=== 1865 ===
The 124th Ohio Infantry mustered out of service at Nashville, Tennessee, on July 9, 1865.

== Affiliations, battle honors, detailed service, and casualties ==
=== Organizational affiliation ===
Attached to:

- District of Western Kentucky, Department of the Ohio, to February 1863
- Franklin Tenn., Army of Kentucky, Department of the Cumberland, to June 1863
- 2nd Brigade, 2nd Division,XXI Corps, Army of the Cumberland (AoC), to October 1863
- 2nd Brigade, 3rd Division, IV Corps, AoC, to June 1865.

=== List of battles ===
The official list of battles in which the regiment bore a part:

- Battle of Thompson's Station
- Tullahoma Campaign
- Chickamauga Campaign
- Battle of Chickamauga
- Siege of Chattanooga
- Battle of Missionary Ridge
- Knoxville Campaign
- Atlanta campaign
- Battle of Resaca
- Battle of Dallas
- Battle of New Hope Church
- Battle of Allatoona
- Battle of Kennesaw Mountain
- Battle of Peachtree Creek
- Siege of Atlanta
- Battle of Jonesboro
- Battle of Lovejoy's Station
- Battle of Franklin
- Battle of Nashville

=== Detailed service ===
The regiment's detailed service was as follows:

==== 1862 ====
- Left State for Louisville, Ky., January 1
- Moved to Elizabethtown, Ky., and duty there tin February 10, 1863.

==== 1863 ====
- To Franklin February 21
- Garrison duty there till June
- Reconnaissance to Thompson's Station, Spring Hill, March 4–5
- Battle of Thompson's Station June 5
- Middle Tennessee (or Tullahoma) Campaign June 23-July 7
- Camp at Manchester until August 16
- Passage of the Cumberland Mountains, Tennessee River, and Chickamauga Campaign August 16-September 22
- At Poe's Tavern August 20-September 9
- Crossing the Tennessee River September 10
- Lee and Gordon's Mills September 11–13
- Battle of Chickamauga September 19–20
- Siege of Chattanooga, Tenn., September 24-November 23
- Reopening Tennessee River October 26–29
- Brown's Ferry October 27
- Chattanooga-Ringgold Campaign November 23–27
- Orchard Knob November 23–24
- Missionary Ridge November 25
- March to relief of Knoxville, November 28-December 8
- Operations in East Tennessee till April 1864.

==== 1864 ====
- Operations about Dandridge January 16–17
- Atlanta Campaign May 1 to September 8
- Demonstrations on Rocky Faced Ridge and Dalton, Ga., May 8–13
- Battle of Resaca May 14–16
- Adairsville May 17
- Near Kingston May 18–19
- Near Cassville May 19
- Advance on Dallas May 22–25
- Operations on line of Pumpkin Vine Creek and battles about Dallas, New Hope Church and Allatoona Hills May 25-June 5
- Pickett's Mills May 27
- Operations about Marietta and against Kenesaw Mountain June 10-July 2
- Pine Hill June 11–14
- Lost Mountain June 15–17
- Assault on Kenesaw June 27
- Ruff's Station July 4
- Chattahoochie River July 5–17
- Peach Tree Creek July 19–20
- Siege of Atlanta July 22-August 25
- Flank movement on Jonesboro August 25–30
- Battle of Jonesboro August 31-September 1
- Lovejoy Station September 2–6
- Pursuit of Hood into Alabama October 3–26
- At Athens, Ga., October 31 to November 23
- March to Columbia; Tenn., November 23–24
- Columbia, Duck River, November 24–27
- Battle of Franklin November 30
- Battle of Nashville December 15–16
- Pursuit of Hood to the Tennessee River December 17–28
- Moved to Huntsville, AL, and duty there till March 1865.

==== 1865 ====
- Operations in East Tennessee March 15-April 22
- Duty at Strawberry Plains and Nashville till June
- Mustered out June 16, 1865

=== Casualties ===
The regiment lost a total of 210 men during service; 7 officers and 78 enlisted men killed or mortally wounded, 1 officer and 124 enlisted men died of disease.

== Commanders ==
- Colonel Oliver Hazard Payne

== Notable members ==
- Corporal Franklin Carr, Company D - Medal of Honor recipient for action at the battle of Nashville, December 16, 1864

== See also ==
- List of Ohio Civil War units
- Ohio in the Civil War
