= Alphonso G. Kellam =

19th century American judge

The Honorable A. G. Kellam

Justice of the South Dakota Supreme Court from the 4th judicial district
- In office November 2, 1889 – January 31, 1896
- Preceded by: Position established
- Succeeded by: Dick Haney

Member of the Wisconsin State Assembly from the Walworth 1st district
- In office January 4, 1869 – January 3, 1870
- Preceded by: Joseph F. Lyon
- Succeeded by: Henry Hall

Personal details
- Born: November 23, 1837 Livingston County, New York, U.S.
- Died: June 15, 1909 (aged 71) Spokane, Washington, U.S.
- Resting place: Greenwood Memorial Terrace, Spokane, Washington
- Party: Republican
- Spouse: Clara Cole (m. 1865–1909)
- Children: Fred Ward Kellam^{(b. 1874; died 1924)}; Infant son^{(b. 1880; died 1880)}
- Education: Genesee Wesleyan Seminary
- Profession: lawyer

Military service
- Allegiance: United States
- Branch/service: United States Volunteers; Union Army
- Rank: Captain, USV
- Unit: 22nd Reg. Wis. Vol. Infantry
- Battles/wars: American Civil War: Battle of Thompson's Station; Atlanta campaign; Savannah Campaign

Alphonso George Kellam (November 23, 1837 – June 15, 1909) was an American lawyer, judge, and Republican politician. He was one of the original justices of the South Dakota Supreme Court, and previously served one term in the Wisconsin State Assembly. He also served as a Union Army officer in the American Civil War.

== Biography ==
After being educated at Genesee Wesleyan Seminary in Lima, New York, Kellam arrived in Wisconsin about 1857 and studied law with a firm in Elkhorn, Wisconsin. Admitted to the bar in 1859, he practiced in Delavan until his service in the American Civil War.

In 1862, he assisted in raising a company of volunteers for the Union Army and was elected their captain. His company was enrolled as Company D of the 22nd Wisconsin Infantry Regiment. He was captured during the Battle of Thompson's Station in March 1863 and spent time as a prisoner of war in Libby Prison. Subsequent to his imprisonment, he was detailed to the staff of brigade commander John Coburn, where he served during the Atlanta campaign and Sherman's March to the Sea, through the close of the war. He was designated for promotion to major in 1864, but the rank was never made official.

He mustered out in June 1865 and resumed his legal practice in Delavan. He served a one-year term in the Wisconsin State Assembly in 1869. In 1871 he moved to Hampton, Iowa, where he practiced law and became president of a local bank. In 1881 he moved to Chamberlain in the Dakota Territory, where he founded a bank and practiced law. After serving in the constitutional conventions of 1883, 1885, and 1889, he was elected to the South Dakota Supreme Court in 1889 and again in 1893.

Kellam resigned in January 1896 amid allegations of adultery and bribery. He immediately fled the state to Spokane, Washington, and re-established himself as a lawyer, practicing there until his death in 1909.

Kellam was married in October 1865 to Clara Cole (1840-1923) in Smithfield, New York. They had two children, though one died in infancy. Their son, Fred W. Kellam, also became a lawyer in Spokane.

Wisconsin State Assembly
Preceded by Joseph F. Lyon	Member of the Wisconsin State Assembly from the Walworth 1st district January 4, 1869 – January 3, 1870	Succeeded by Henry Hall
Legal offices
New state government	Justice of the South Dakota Supreme Court from the 4th judicial district November 2, 1889 – January 31, 1896	Succeeded by Dick Haney
