= Dwight Allen =

Dwight Allen may refer to:

- Dwight Sidney Allen (1843–1908), member of the Wisconsin State Assembly
- Dwight W. Allen (1931–2021), professor of education
