= John Coburn (Indiana politician) =

American politician (1825–1908)

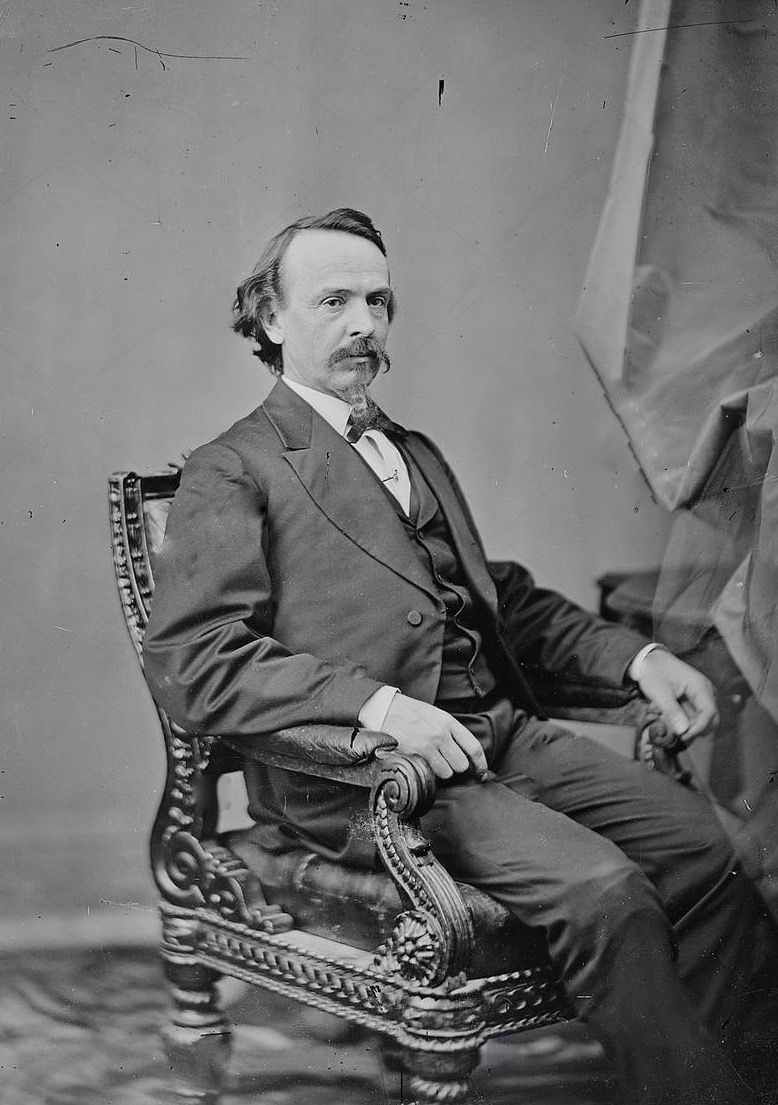
- Congressman John Coburn

Associate Justice of Montana Territorial Supreme Court
- In office February 19, 1884 – December 1885
- Appointed by: Rutherford B. Hayes
- Preceded by: Everton Conger
- Succeeded by: Charles Rowan Pollard

Member of the U.S. House of Representatives from Indiana's 5th district
- In office March 4, 1867 – March 3, 1875
- Preceded by: George W. Julian
- Succeeded by: William S. Holman

Personal details
- Born: October 27, 1825 Indianapolis, Indiana, US
- Died: January 28, 1908 (aged 82) Indianapolis, Indiana, US
- Resting place: Crown Hill Cemetery and Arboretum, Section 27, Lot 136; 39.8171219°N 86.1703229°W

Military service
- Allegiance: United States of America; Union
- Branch/service: United States Army; Union Army
- Years of service: 1861–1865
- Rank: Colonel; Brevet Brigadier General
- Commands: 33rd Indiana Infantry
- Battles/wars: American Civil War

John Coburn (October 27, 1825 – January 28, 1908) was a United States representative from Indiana and an officer in the Union Army during the American Civil War.

== Early life and career ==
Coburn was born in Indianapolis, Indiana, in 1825 (the year the city became the new state capital) and attended the public schools there. Later, he attended Wabash College in Crawfordsville, Indiana, graduating in 1846. As a student, he founded the Wabash College chapter of Beta Theta Pi fraternity, the first Greek letter fraternity on the campus and in continuous existence to today. He studied law, was admitted to the bar in 1849, and commenced practice in Indianapolis.

=== Civil War ===
Coburn was a member of the Indiana House of Representatives in 1850. He served as a judge of the Court of Common Pleas from 1859 to 1861, when he resigned to enter the Union Army following the outbreak of the American Civil War. He became colonel of the 33rd Indiana Infantry Regiment that mustered in at Indianapolis on September 16, 1861. By the following month, Coburn's regiment part of Brig. Gen. A.F. Schoepf's brigade in southeast Kentucky, seeing action at the Battle of Camp Wildcat.

Coburn and the 33rd Indiana remained in Kentucky for all of 1862; most notably serving as part of George W. Morgan's force that seized control of the Cumberland Gap in June.

In October 1862, Coburn was assigned command of a new brigade in Maj. Gen Gordon Granger's Union Army of Kentucky, made up of his old 33rd Indiana, the 85th Indiana, 19th Michigan, and 22nd Wisconsin regiments. The brigade remained in Kentucky until late January 1863, when Granger's force was ordered to reinforce Maj. Gen. Rosecrans' Army of the Cumberland in Tennessee.

Granger's men arrived in Tennessee during period of relative inactivity following the Battle of Stones River. From February 8 to March 2, Coburn's brigade was stationed at Brentwood. On March 2, it reinforced Brig. Gen. Charles C. Gilbert's division at Franklin. On March 4, Coburn's brigade was carrying out a reconnaissance-in-force that ran into Confederate cavalry, precipitating the Battle of Thompson's Station the next day, where Coburn would surrender his force.

Following his surrender Coburn spent time in Libby Prison before being exchanged. Later, Coburn and Colonel Benjamin Harrison fought side by side in several battles while under General William Tecumseh Sherman's command. During that time, Coburn and his troops were the first into Atlanta and secured the city's surrender. There is a large marker in downtown Atlanta where the city's mayor surrendered the city to Coburn. He was mustered out on September 20, 1864.

On January 13, 1866, President Andrew Johnson nominated Coburn for appointment to the grade of brevet brigadier general of volunteers, to rank from March 13, 1865, and the United States Senate confirmed the appointment on March 12, 1866.

Coburn and his father were instrumental in saving the Indiana Historical Society and its papers in its early days. Coburn also gave one of the dedication speeches for the Indianapolis Soldiers and Sailors Monument.

He promoted the building of the Soldiers' and Sailors' Orphanage in Knightstown, Indiana, and he helped secure the use of land in Indianapolis for Garfield Park. His later years were spent living in the Bates-Hendricks House at 1526 S. New Jersey Street in Indianapolis with his wife Caroline (Test) Coburn until his death in 1908.

== Congressional service ==
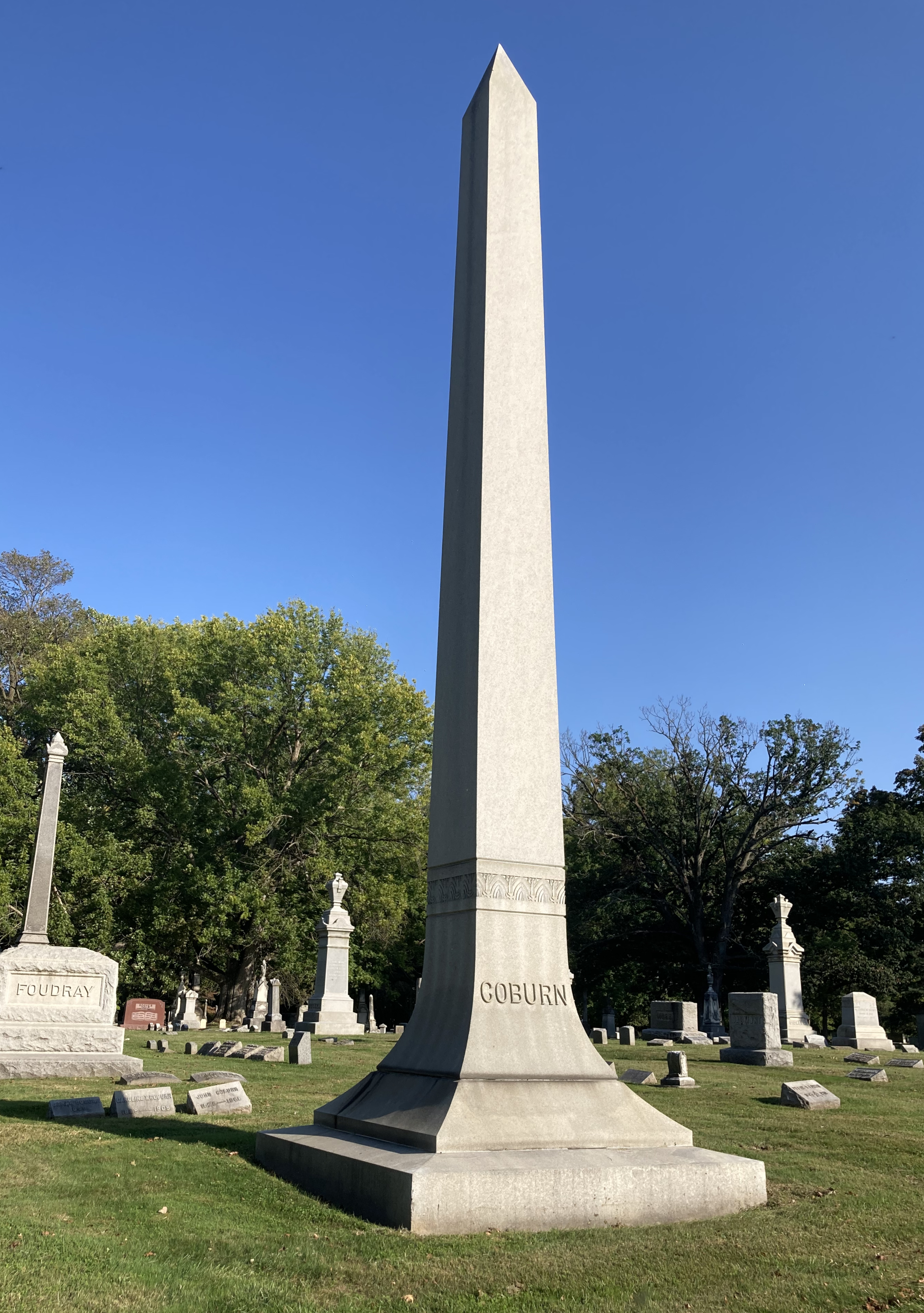
Coburn's grave at Crown Hill Cemetery

Coburn was appointed as the first secretary of the Territory of Montana in March 1865 but resigned at once. He was elected judge of the fifth judicial circuit of Indiana in October 1865 and resigned in July 1866. Later, he was elected as a Republican to the Fortieth and to the three succeeding Congresses (March 4, 1867 – March 3, 1875). While in Congress, he served as chairman of the Committee on Public Expenditures (41st Congress), and as a member of Committee on Military Affairs (42nd and 43rd Congresses). He was an unsuccessful candidate for reelection in 1874 to the 44th Congress.

After leaving Congress, he was appointed a justice of the Supreme Court of the Territory of Montana on February 19, 1884, and served until December 1885. He returned to Indianapolis, and resumed the practice of law. He died in Indianapolis on January 28, 1908, and was buried in Crown Hill Cemetery (Section 27, Lot 136).

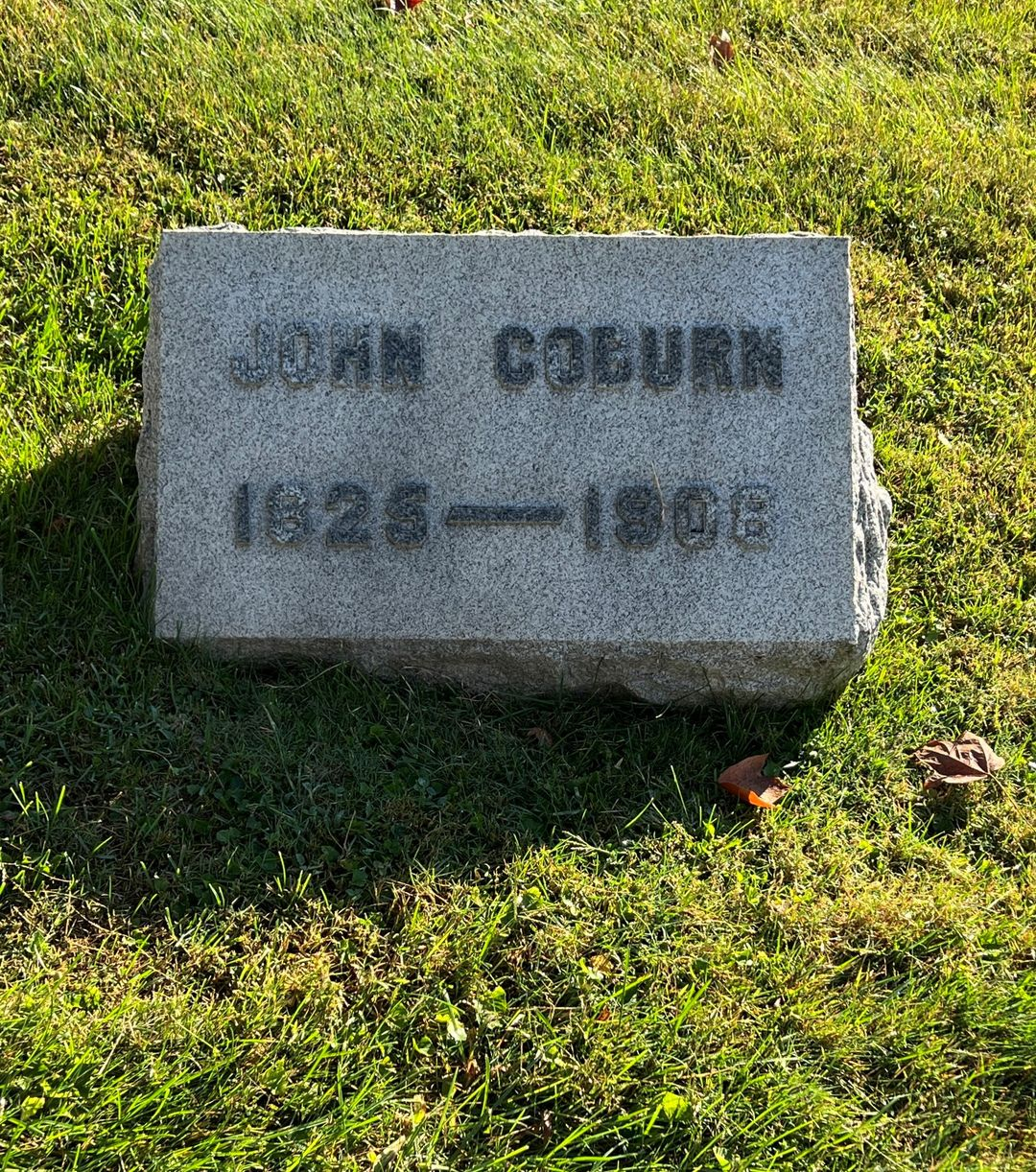
Tombstone for John Coburn at Crown Hill Cemetery and Arboretum

== See also ==
- List of American Civil War brevet generals (Union)
- Atlanta in the American Civil War

U.S. House of Representatives
Preceded by Ebenezer Dumont	Member of the U.S. House of Representatives from Indiana's 6th congressional district 1867-1869	Succeeded by Thomas M. Browne
Preceded by George W. Julian	Member of the U.S. House of Representatives from Indiana's 5th congressional district 1869-1875	Succeeded by William S. Holman
