= Franklin Carr (soldier) =

American Civil War Medal of Honor recipient

Franklin "Frank" Benjamin Carr
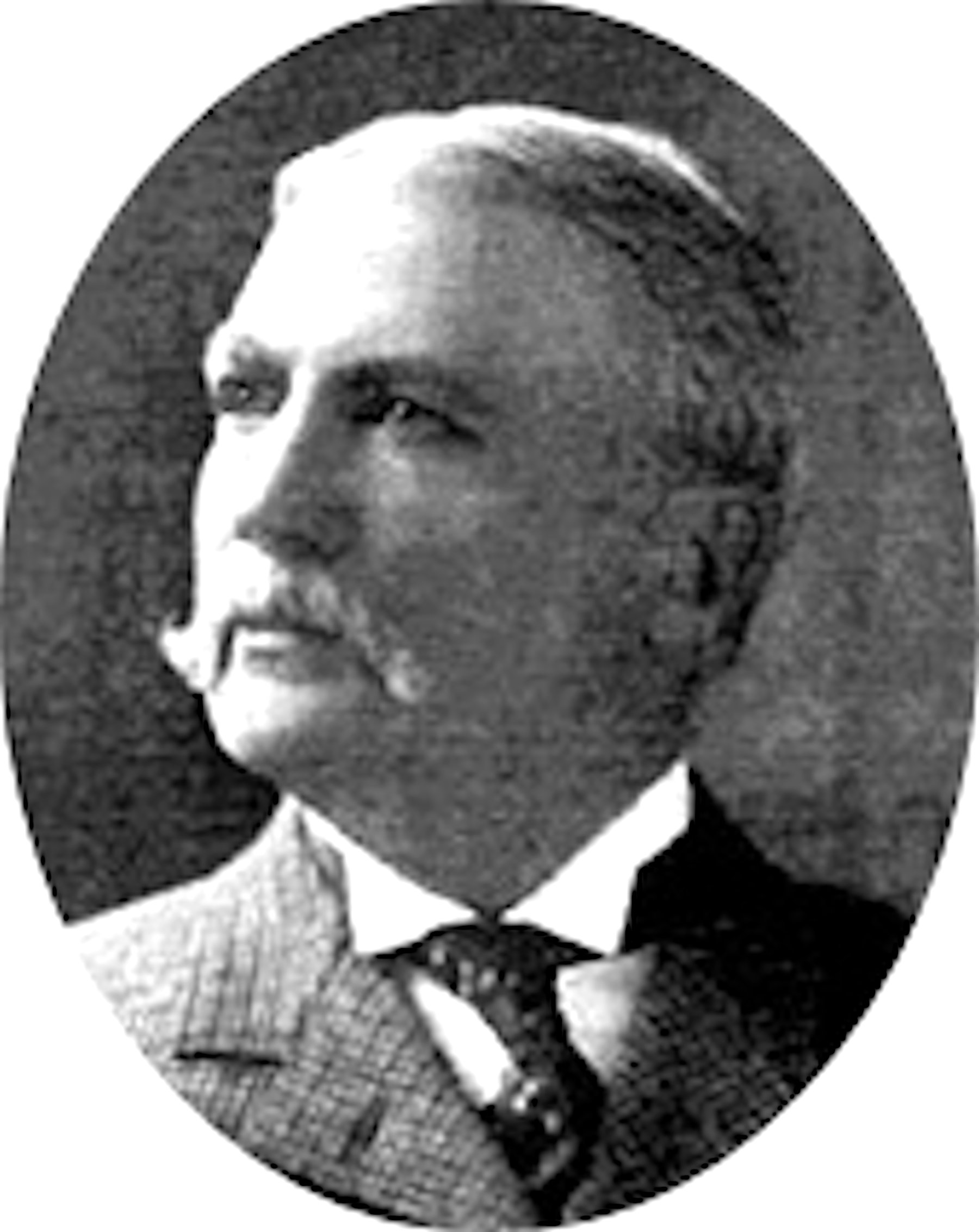
- Carr in 1895
- Born: c. 1844; Stark County, Ohio
- Died: October 16, 1904 (aged 59–60); Pittsburg, Oklahoma
- Military career
- Allegiance: United States of America
- Branch: United States Army
- Rank: Corporal
- Unit: 124th Regiment Ohio Volunteer Infantry - Company D
- Conflicts: Battle of Nashville
- Awards: Medal of Honor

Corporal Franklin Carr (c. 1844 – October 16, 1904) was an American soldier who fought in the American Civil War. Carr received the country's highest award for bravery during combat, the Medal of Honor, for his action during the Battle of Nashville in Tennessee on December 16, 1864. He was honored with the award on February 24, 1865.

== Biography ==
Carr was born in Stark County, Ohio in about 1844, the son of Elijah Carr and Ann Shull. He married Catherine "Kate" Trubey, and together they had four children, Charles H Carr, William A Carr, Nettie E Carr and Eugene E Carr. He was enlisted in the 124th Ohio Infantry during the American Civil War. He died on 16 October 1904.

== Medal of Honor citation ==
Recapture of U.S. guidon from a rebel battery.

== See also ==
- List of American Civil War Medal of Honor recipients: A–F
