= Bates–Hendricks =

Neighborhood in Indianapolis, Indiana, US

The Bates–Hendricks neighborhood is situated just south and east of the downtown commercial district of Indianapolis, Indiana. The Fountain Square business district is just to the east.

Access to the neighborhood from the north is by way of East Street, while Terrace Street off of Madison Avenue enters the neighborhood from the west and Prospect Street offers access from Fountain Square.

== Bates–Hendricks House ==
- Bates Hendricks House
- U.S. National Register of Historic Places
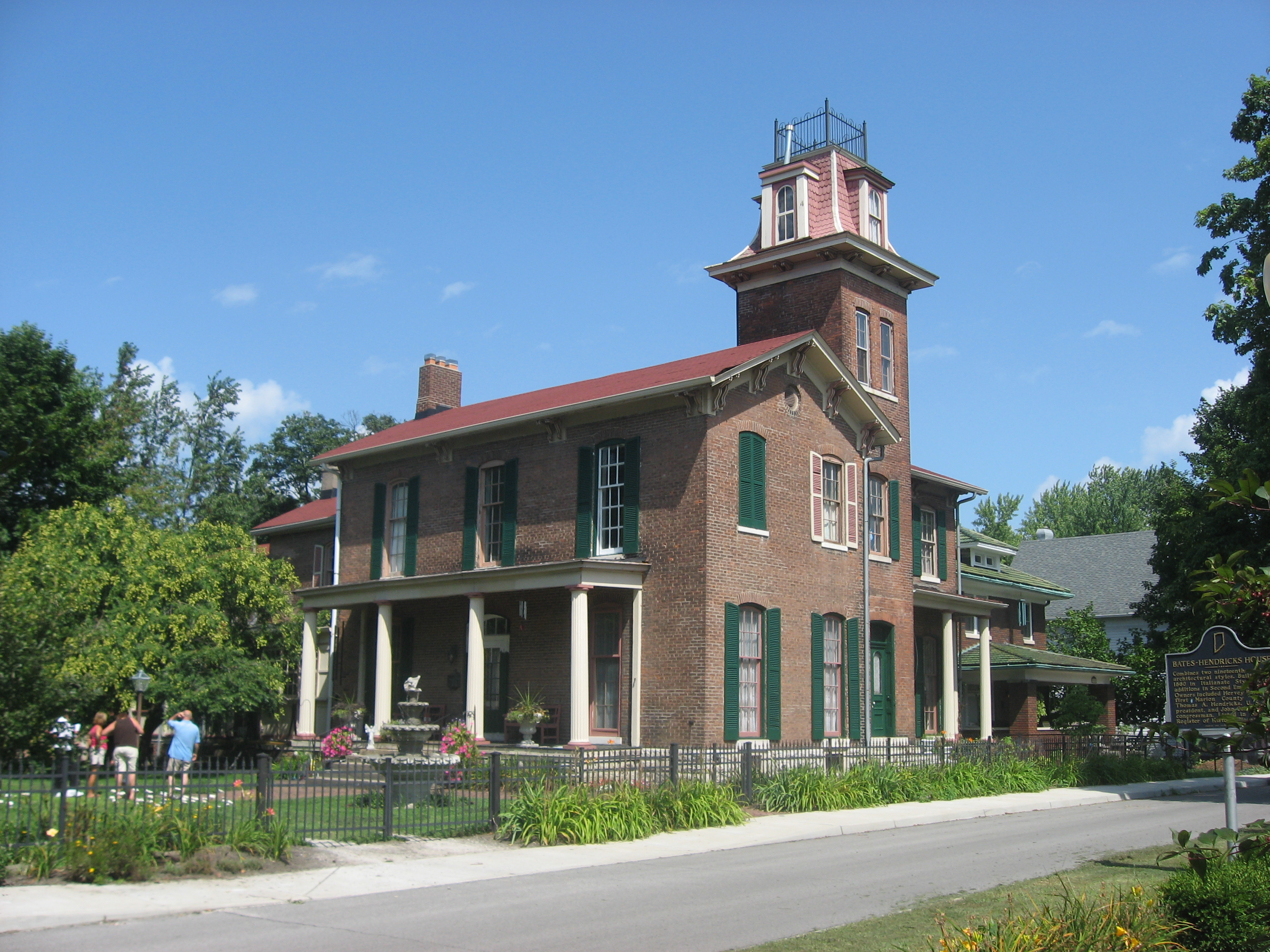
- Bates–Hendricks House viewed from the southeast

- Location within Indianapolis Location within Indiana Location within the United States
- Location: 1526 S. New Jersey St. Indianapolis, Indiana, United States
- Coordinates: 39°44′46.4″N 86°9′2.8″W
- Built: 1820s, 1851, 1858
- NRHP reference No.: 77000143

The neighborhood takes its name from the historic Bates–Hendricks House, located at 1526 S. New Jersey Street in the western part of the neighborhood. The house is listed on the National Register of Historic Places and home tours are offered by appointment.

The home was constructed in three phases. The first section was built about 1830 by Richard Keene, the land's patent holder. He had purchased the land from the federal government in July 1821, just as the Indians vacated the area. The second section was completed by Hervey Bates in 1851. The newest section was completed in 1858.

The smaller Keene section of the house is of Federal design. The larger Bates-built section is of Italianate design complete with a 60-foot (18 m) tower on the home's east exposure. The house is one of the oldest standing structures in Indianapolis and Marion County.

Bates was Marion County's first sheriff (1822) and later, president of the Indianapolis branch of the state Bank of Indiana. He and James Lanier (from Madison, Indiana) brought the state's first railroad, the Madison and Indianapolis, to Indianapolis in 1847. In 1852, Bates built the lavish Bates House Hotel in downtown Indianapolis, where Abraham Lincoln stayed while en route to his first inauguration in Washington, D.C.

Thomas A. Hendricks also lived in the home; he served as U.S. Senator from Indiana, Governor of Indiana, and Vice-President of the United States.

General John Coburn lived in the home for thirty years. He and his troops were the first Union forces into Atlanta during the Civil War and secured the city's surrender. Upon his return to Indianapolis he became a four-time U.S. Congressman and set the cornerstone for the Soldiers and Sailors Monument.

In the early twentieth century the home's tower hosted one of the first radio transmitters in Indiana.

In 1971, a building survey was done for the Bates–Hendricks House. It was used as the basis of all historic building data information in the years to follow. A copy of the original survey was found in the Library of Congress and reviewed against current known information. Many major errors were found in the 1971 document including the construction dates of the home. Currently, the Library of Congress Survey is being updated to reflect what is now known about the Bates–Hendricks structure.

== Neighborhood history ==
Madison Avenue, the western boundary of the neighborhood, is the old Mauxferry Road. This was the first road built into Indian territory to service the new capital of Indianapolis. It was surveyed in 1822 and completed in 1824. It was the road used to move the tools of government from Corydon (the old state capital) to Indianapolis. It also served as the stagecoach road to reach the steamboats on the Ohio River before the railroad era.

James O. Woodruff built the Victorian neighborhood around the Bates–Hendricks House in 1872, calling it Hendricks Place. He would later develop Woodruff Place on the east side of Indianapolis.

In October 1900, pharmacist John A. Hook opened the first Hook's Drug Store at the corner of Prospect and East Streets. Although that building no longer exists, Hook's grew to be a chain of over 160 stores throughout Indiana, and after several mergers, became part of the CVS Pharmacy chain.

The Sanders-Childers House at 1020 E. Palmer Street is the oldest house in Indianapolis. It is a two-story brick farmhouse constructed around 1820 by William Sanders. The original portion of the house sits at an angle to Palmer and Barth streets because those streets were not laid out until later. Alterations were made at various times, including a modernization in the 1920s by Frank R. Childers, who was the Marion County Recorder from 1927 to 1930. The former Abraham Lincoln School #18 across the street at 1001 E. Palmer Street was built in 1901 and is on the site where a group of Delaware Indians had a sugar camp until 1820.

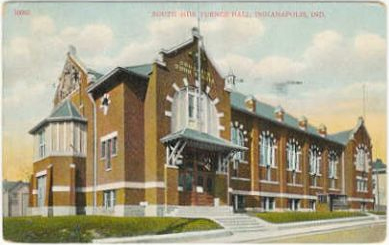
Southside Turners building in 1908

The South Side Turnverein Hall at 306 E. Prospect Street in the northwest corner of the neighborhood was constructed in 1900 by the Southside Turnverein, a German-American gymnastics club. The architects were Vonnegut and Bohn, who earlier had designed Das Deutsche Haus, now known as the Athenaeum, in downtown Indianapolis. Anti-German sentiment resulting from World War I led to the German-American community distancing itself from German culture and a decline in the Turners movement, but the building remained a center for the community. On October 4, 1960, for example, it was the site of a campaign speech by Senator John F. Kennedy. In 1977, the Turnverein sold it to Tony Elrod. He turned the second floor into a basketball court and the building became known as the Madison Avenue Athletic Club. However, the deterioration of the building led to its being placed on the Indiana Landmarks' Ten Most Endangered list. The owners of Point Comfort Underwriters purchased the building in July 2016 for $950,000 and undertook a complete renovation of the building; the project was led by Ratio Architects. The building reopened on November 9, 2018, and now serves as the headquarters for Point Comfort. The building was added to the National Register of Historic Places in 2019.

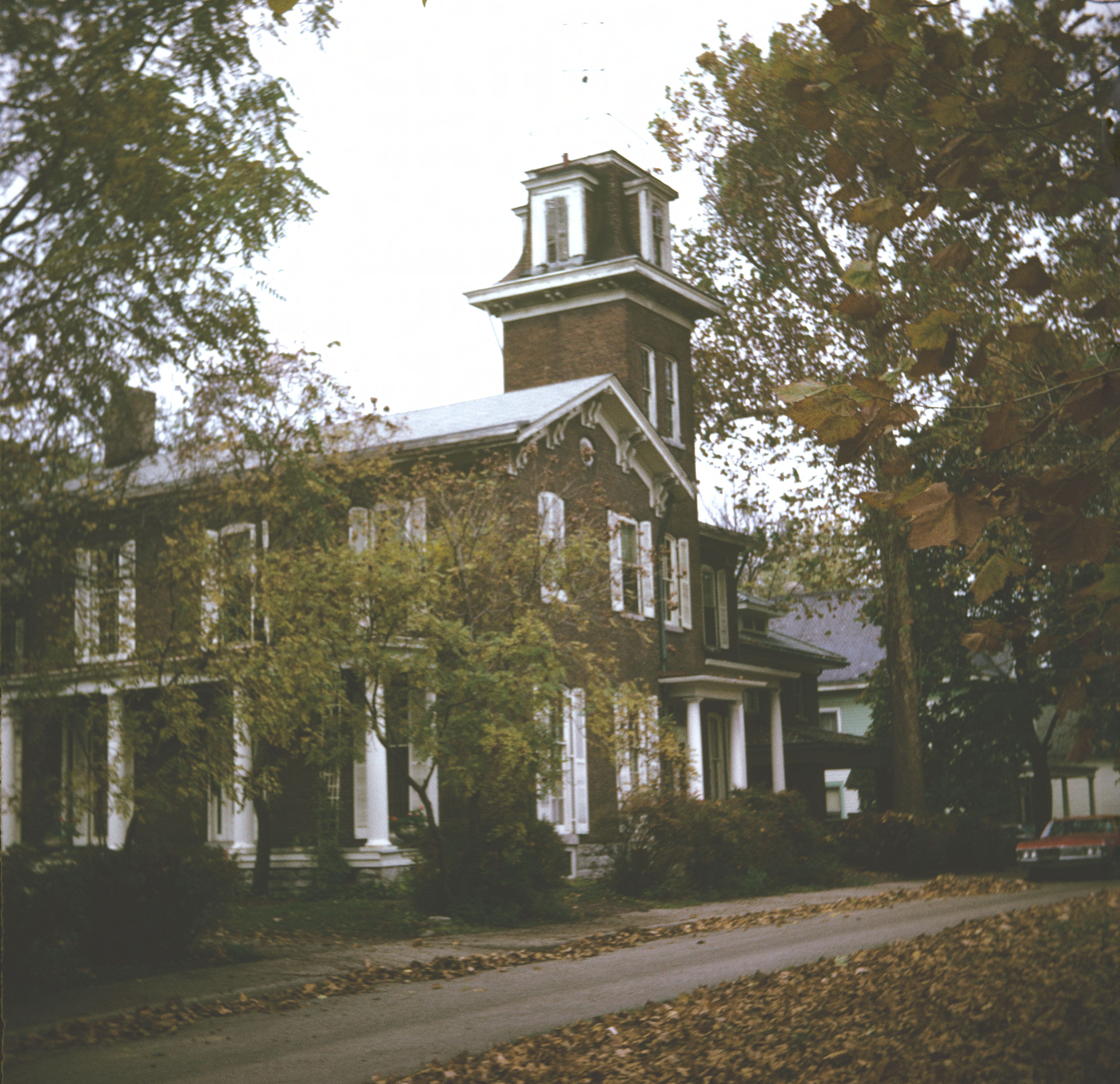
Bates-Hendricks House photographed in 1970.

== Redevelopment ==
In 2008–2009, the 1400 and 1500 blocks of S. New Jersey Street saw a major redevelopment of the housing along the street. New landscaping was also provided to the Woodruff-built esplanade that runs down the center of the street. A similar project was undertaken in 2010 for the 1500 block of S. Alabama Street one block to the west, which contains the only other Woodruff-built esplanade in the neighborhood.

In 2010 the New Jersey Street project was awarded third-place in the 'Physical Revitalization Beautification – Single Neighborhood' division of the 'Neighborhood of the Year Awards' awarded by Neighborhoods USA (NUSA).

The neighborhood has seen a significant amount of renovation and house-flipping since 2010. Several of the house renovations have been aired on the Good Bones television show. In 2018, the median price of the 149 homes sold was $189,900, ranging from $41,000 for a "fixer-upper" to $409,000 for a completely renovated one. Median household income in 2016 was $24,748, lower than the $43,369 for all of Marion County, but up from 2015, when it was only $19,567.

In 2018 the neighborhood association developed a plan to encourage commercial development of S. East Street, which bisects the neighborhood. The plan seeks to maintain the mixed-income character of the neighborhood, focusing on attracting businesses wanted by local residents but avoiding the chain and expensive restaurants, liquor stores, and nightclubs that have proliferated in Fountain Square and Broad Ripple Village.

Karen E. Laine and Mina Starsiak Hawk of the Good Bones television series opened a home furnishings store named Two Chicks District Co. at 1531 S. East Street on June 20, 2020. The building was originally the Lincoln Theatre, a silent movie house. Most recently it had housed a countertop laminate fabrication firm. Two Chicks and a Hammer had purchased the building in 2015 for use as a warehouse.

== Green space ==
Most of the Bates–Hendricks neighborhood consists of one- and two-family residences with small front yards and larger back yards. Besides the esplanades on New Jersey and Alabama streets, there are several public green spaces.

Hendricks Park, in the 1300 block of Madison Avenue, is part of the Indianapolis Department of Parks and Recreation. Construction began in late 2000 and finished in 2002. This small park on the western edge of the neighborhood is the site of Lars Jonker's abstract sculpture Play. The park also has a small pavilion.

Ringgold Park at 1500 Ringgold Street is a .21-acre (0.085 ha) minipark with playground equipment. The park was originally constructed in the early 1900s on .9 acres (0.36 ha) northwest of its current location. At that time it contained a bathing pool, but by 1936 the pool had been removed and swings and volleyball court had been added. By 1956 a baseball diamond had been laid out. In the 1960s, the construction of I-65 through the park resulted in the relocation to its current site. In 2015, Keep Indianapolis Beautiful revitalized the park by installing native plantings and updating its equipment.

The Pleasant Run Trail cuts through the southeast corner of the neighborhood along the creek of the same name on its way to Garfield Park a half-mile south. The parkways on each side of the creek are part of the Indianapolis Park and Boulevard System designed by George Kessler.

== Education ==
The James A. Garfield School 31, an Indianapolis Public Schools elementary school, is located at 307 Lincoln Street across from the southern end of the Alabama Street esplanade. The Southeast Neighborhood School of Excellence (SENSE) for elementary grades at 1601 S. Barth Avenue is also located within the Bates–Hendricks neighborhood.

== See also ==
- List of neighborhoods in Indianapolis
