= Dwight Sidney Allen =

American politician

Member of the Wisconsin State Assembly
- In office 1888–1888

Personal details
- Born: February 12, 1843 Lebanon, New York
- Died: May 5, 1908 (aged 65)

Dwight Sidney Allen (February 12, 1843 – May 5, 1908) was a member of the Wisconsin State Assembly.

== Biography ==
Allen was born on February 12, 1843, in Lebanon, New York. During the American Civil War, he served with the 22nd Wisconsin Volunteer Infantry Regiment of the Union Army. He would take part in the Battle of Thompson's Station, Battle of Resaca, Battle of Kennesaw Mountain, Battle of Peachtree Creek and Sherman's March to the Sea. On September 4, 1867, Allen married Delia A. Sherman. He died on May 5, 1908.

== Political career ==
Allen was elected to the Assembly in 1888. From 1877 to 1890, Allen was a member of the County Board of Walworth County, Wisconsin, serving as Chairman for much of that time. Additionally, he was Town Treasurer and Chairman of the Town Board (similar to city council) of Linn, Wisconsin, and a justice of the peace. He was a Republican.
