= Good Bones (TV series) =

- Genre: Real estate
- Country of origin: United States
- Original language: English
- No. of seasons: 8
- No. of episodes: 101

Production
- Running time: 43 minutes

Original release
- Network: HGTV
- Release: March 22, 2016 – October 17, 2023

Good Bones is an American reality television series airing on HGTV starring Karen E. Laine and Mina Starsiak Hawk, based in Indianapolis, Indiana. The show's pilot aired on March 22, 2016. The final episode aired on October 17, 2023.

== Premise ==
In 2007, Karen E. Laine was working as a defense attorney and her daughter, Mina Starsiak Hawk, was working as a part-time waitress. Starsiak Hawk is Laine's daughter from her first marriage, to an orthopedic surgeon. The mother-daughter duo began flipping houses in their free time in the Fountain Square neighborhood of Indianapolis. In 2008, the two decided to open a home rehab business, called Two Chicks and a Hammer, Inc.

In addition to renovation work, Starsiak Hawk is also a real estate agent. Laine retired as a stakeholder in the business in 2019, but continues to appear on the show and participate in renovations.

Their signature style includes creating green spaces wherever possible and incorporating work by local artists and craftsmen to put a personal touch on the homes. Karen often restores or repurposes objects found in homes. The mother-daughter team expanded into the Bates–Hendricks neighborhood, and recently expanded into Old Southside - all areas with dilapidated homes, which Mina, Karen and crew renovate or restore.

Other family members who appear on the show include Starsiak Hawk's half-brother Tad, who leads the demo crew, assisted by his right-hand man, former offensive lineman Austin “Bobkat” Aynes.

Lonny, their foreman, and longtime head contractor and Tad's step-father, Lenny, also appeared. Lenny left the show in 2019.

Starsiak Hawk and Laine created a video to explain the complex family relationships among the team.

In 2019, Laine and Starsiak Hawk took part in HGTV's A Very Brady Renovation.

In 2018's season three, Mina Starsiak Hawk and her husband Steve Hawk had their first child, Jack. In September 2020 she gave birth to their second child, daughter Charlotte.

On October 4, 2019, Laine announced her retirement from the family renovation company, Two Chicks and a Hammer, to spend more time with husband Roger. She appears in the fifth and sixth seasons of Good Bones, focusing on DIY projects.

In 2021 HGTV ordered a seventh season as well as a spinoff series called Good Bones: Risky Business.

== Other business ==
The duo opened a home furnishings store named Two Chicks District Co. at 1531 S. East Street in the Bates–Hendricks neighborhood on June 20, 2020. The business featured a wine and beer bar and tables for laptop use. The building was originally the Lincoln Theatre, a silent movie house and most recently had housed a countertop laminate fabrication firm. Two Chicks and a Hammer purchased the building in 2015 for use as a warehouse. An episode in Season 6 detailed the building's renovation.

In September 2023, Two Chicks District Co. announced it would be closing later that year, with Starsiak Hawk citing "numerous challenges" as a small business. In May 2024, Two Chicks District Co. was reopened in a historic district in Noblesville, a northern suburb of Indianapolis.

== Publications ==
Built Together, Zonderkids, ISBN 0310769280

== Reception ==
Good Bones is considered one of the most popular real estate shows. In 2023 the show was considered one of the top real estate shows to watch as educational material for real estate agents and the #3 most popular real estate show.

== Episodes ==
Season	Episodes	Originally released	
Season	Episodes	First released	Last released
1	11	March 22, 2016	June 20, 2016
2	13	May 30, 2017	August 29, 2017
3	13	April 3, 2018	June 26, 2018
4	15	May 14, 2019	August 20, 2019
5	14	June 9, 2020	September 8, 2020
6	14	June 29, 2021	September 2021
7	13	July 12, 2022	November 2022
8	10	August 15, 2023	October 17, 2023
