= Linn, Wisconsin =

Town of Linn, Wisconsin
- Town
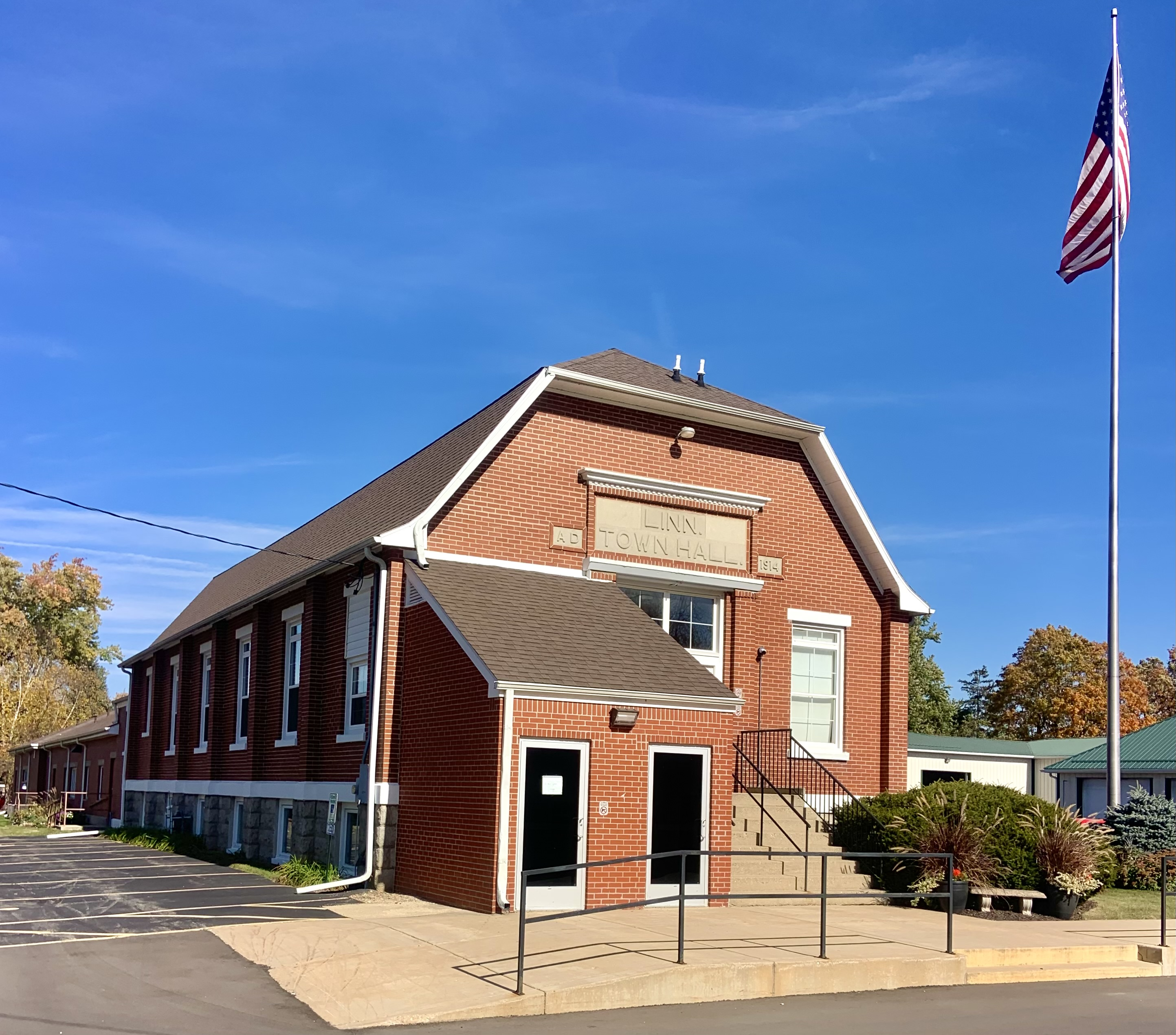
- Town hall

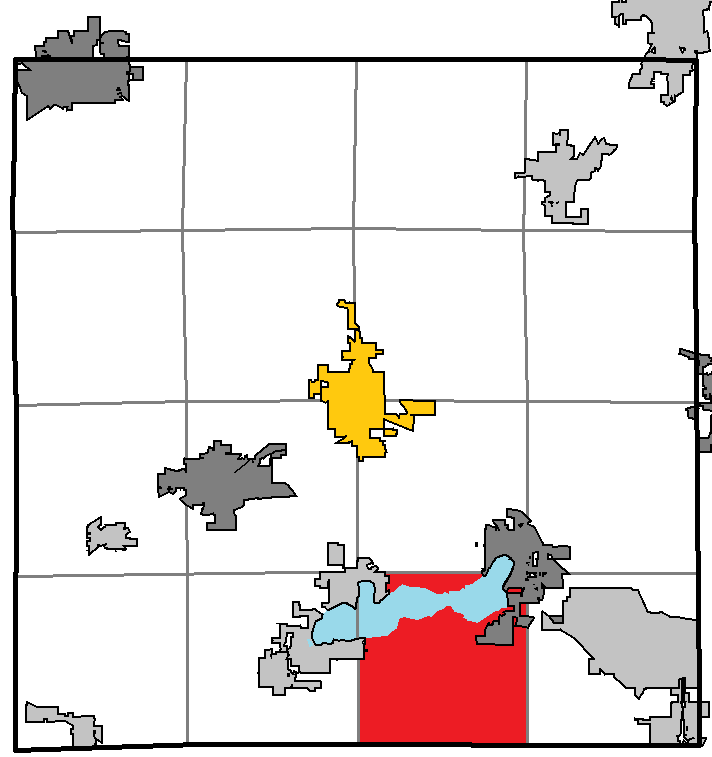
- Location of Linn, within Walworth County

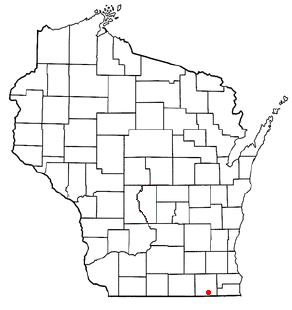
- Location of the Town of Linn, Wisconsin
- Coordinates: 42°33′2″N 88°29′6″W
- Country: United States
- State: Wisconsin
- County: Walworth

Area
  - Total: 33.8 sq mi (87.6 km^{2})
  - Land: 28.7 sq mi (74.3 km^{2})
  - Water: 5.1 sq mi (13.3 km^{2})
- Elevation: 1,030 ft (314 m)

Population (2020)
  - Total: 2,687
  - Density: 76/sq mi (29.5/km^{2})
- Time zone: UTC-6 (Central (CST))
  - Summer (DST): UTC-5 (CDT)
- Area code: 262
- FIPS code: 55-44750
- GNIS feature ID: 1583576
- Website: https://townoflinn.wi.gov/

Linn is a town in Walworth County, Wisconsin, United States. The population was 2,687 at the 2020 census. The unincorporated communities of Linton and Zenda are located within the town.

== Geography ==
According to the United States Census Bureau, the town has a total area of 33.8 square miles (87.6 km^{2}), of which 28.7 square miles (74.3 km^{2}) is land and 5.1 square miles (13.3 km^{2}) (15.19%) is water.

== Demographics ==
As of the census of 2000, there were 2,194 people, 910 households, and 620 families residing in the town. The population density was 76.5 people per square mile (29.5/km^{2}). There were 1,901 housing units at an average density of 66.2 per square mile (25.6/km^{2}). The racial makeup of the town was 97.95% White, 0.18% African American, 0.05% Native American, 0.50% Asian, 0.05% Pacific Islander, 0.82% from other races, and 0.46% from two or more races. Hispanic or Latino of any race were 2.78% of the population.

There were 910 households, out of which 26.6% had children under the age of 18 living with them, 61.2% were married couples living together, 4.3% had a female householder with no husband present, and 31.8% were non-families. 26.8% of all households were made up of individuals, and 10.0% had someone living alone who was 65 years of age or older. The average household size was 2.41 and the average family size was 2.94.

In the town, the population was spread out, with 22.6% under the age of 18, 5.1% from 18 to 24, 27.4% from 25 to 44, 29.2% from 45 to 64, and 15.6% who were 65 years of age or older. The median age was 42 years. For every 100 females, there were 107.8 males. For every 100 females age 18 and over, there were 105.6 males.

The median income for a household in the town was $54,213, and the median income for a family was $62,438. Males had a median income of $41,757 versus $24,853 for females. The per capita income for the town was $29,751. About 3.5% of families and 5.1% of the population were below the poverty line, including 7.2% of those under age 18 and 3.0% of those age 65 or over.

== Notable people ==
- Dwight Sidney Allen, Wisconsin State Representative, soldier and farmer; was Town Treasurer and Chairman of the Town Board of Linn
- Wallace Ingalls, Wisconsin State Representative and lawyer, was born in Linn
