= Battle of Brentwood =

Battle of the American Civil War

- Part of American Civil War
Date	March 25, 1863
Location	Davidson County, Tennessee 36.038072°N 86.787273°W
Result	Confederate victory

Belligerents
United States (Union)	CSA (Confederacy)

Commanders and leaders
Edward Bloodgood	Nathan Bedford Forrest

Units involved
22nd Wisconsin Infantry; 33rd Indiana Infantry Regiment; 19th Michigan Infantry; 1st Division, 1st Cavalry Corps	Forrest's Division

Strength
400	

Casualties and losses
305	6
- Location of battle. Brentwood (the United States)

The Battle of Brentwood took place during the American Civil War on March 25, 1863, in Davidson County, Tennessee at Brentwood, Tennessee.

== Battle ==
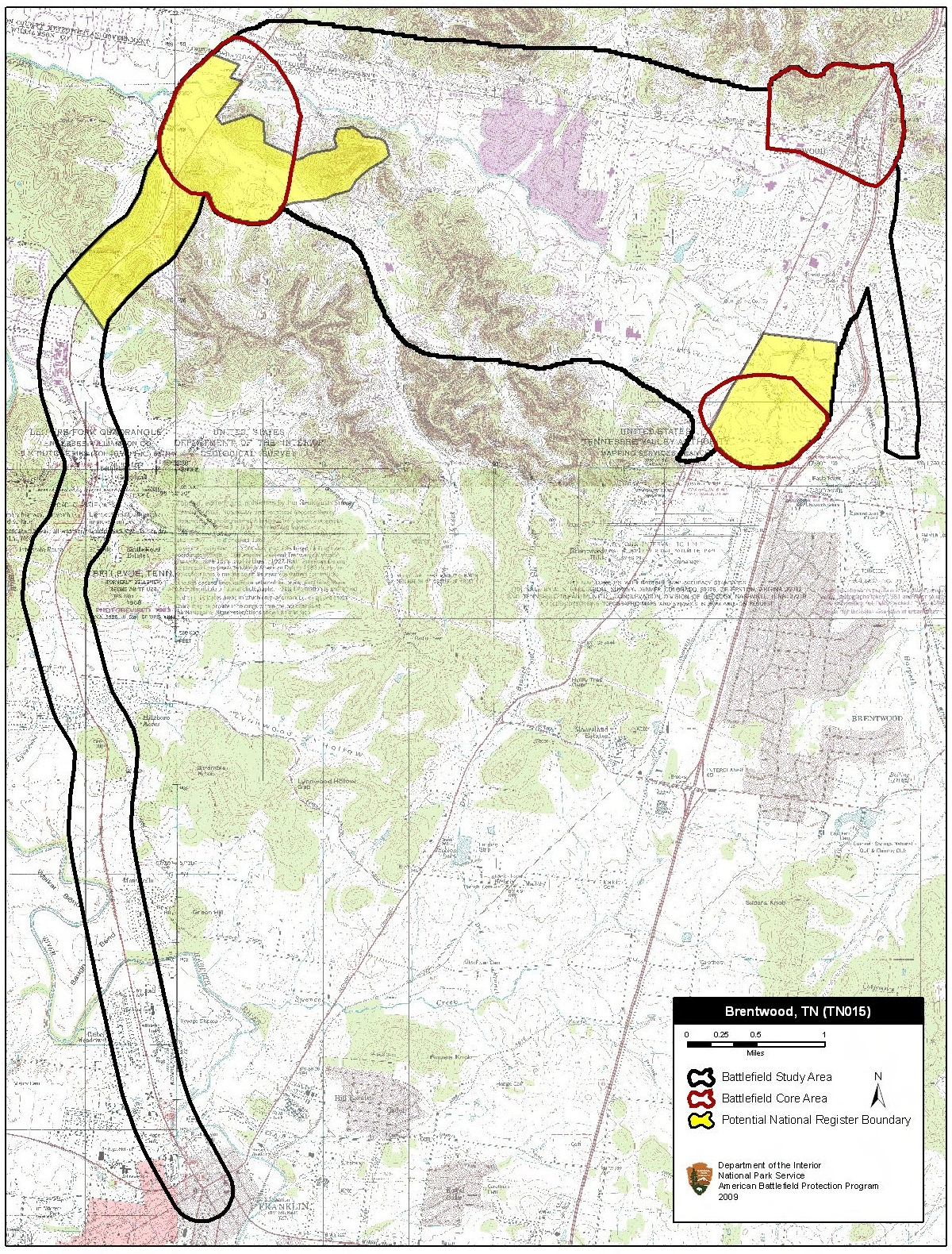
Map of Brentwood Battlefield core and study areas by the American Battlefield Protection Program.

Union Lt. Col. Edward Bloodgood held Brentwood, a station on the Nashville & Decatur Railroad, with 400 men on the morning of March 25, 1863, when Confederate Brig. Gen. Nathan Bedford Forrest, with a powerful column, approached the town. The day before, Forrest had ordered Col. James W. Starnes, commanding the 2nd Brigade, to go to Brentwood, cut the telegraph, tear up railroad track, attack the stockade, and cut off any retreat.

Forrest and the other cavalry brigade made contact with Bloodgood about 7:00 am on March 25. A messenger from the stockade informed Bloodgood that Forrest's men were about to attack and had destroyed the railroad tracks. Bloodgood sought to notify his superiors and discovered that the telegraph lines were cut. Forrest sent in a demand for a surrender under a flag of truce but Bloodgood refused. Within a half-hour, Forrest had artillery in place to shell Bloodgood's position and had surrounded the Federals with a large force. Bloodgood surrendered.

Forrest and his men caused considerable damage during this expedition and Brentwood, Tennessee, on the railroad, was a significant loss to the Federals.

== Modern Locations ==
- Johnson Chapel Road, along which General Forrest led his men to battle from the west, has been renamed Maryland Way. The approach would have started at the modern-day intersection of Maryland Way and High Lea Road in the River Oaks subdivision (36.036798, -86.821647). The troops proceeded east to what is now Franklin Road and Church Street (36.033407, -86.788866).
- The other Confederate brigade approaching from the east, under Colonel James Wellborn Starnes, established their position on a nearby hill, currently the Hilton Suites on Church Street (36.032563, -86.780939).
- Most of the battle took place around what is now the Shell station on the northwest corner of Franklin Road and Old Hickory Boulevard (36.038072, -86.787273).
