= South Side Turnverein Hall =

Historic structure in Indianapolis, Indiana

- U.S. National Register of Historic Places
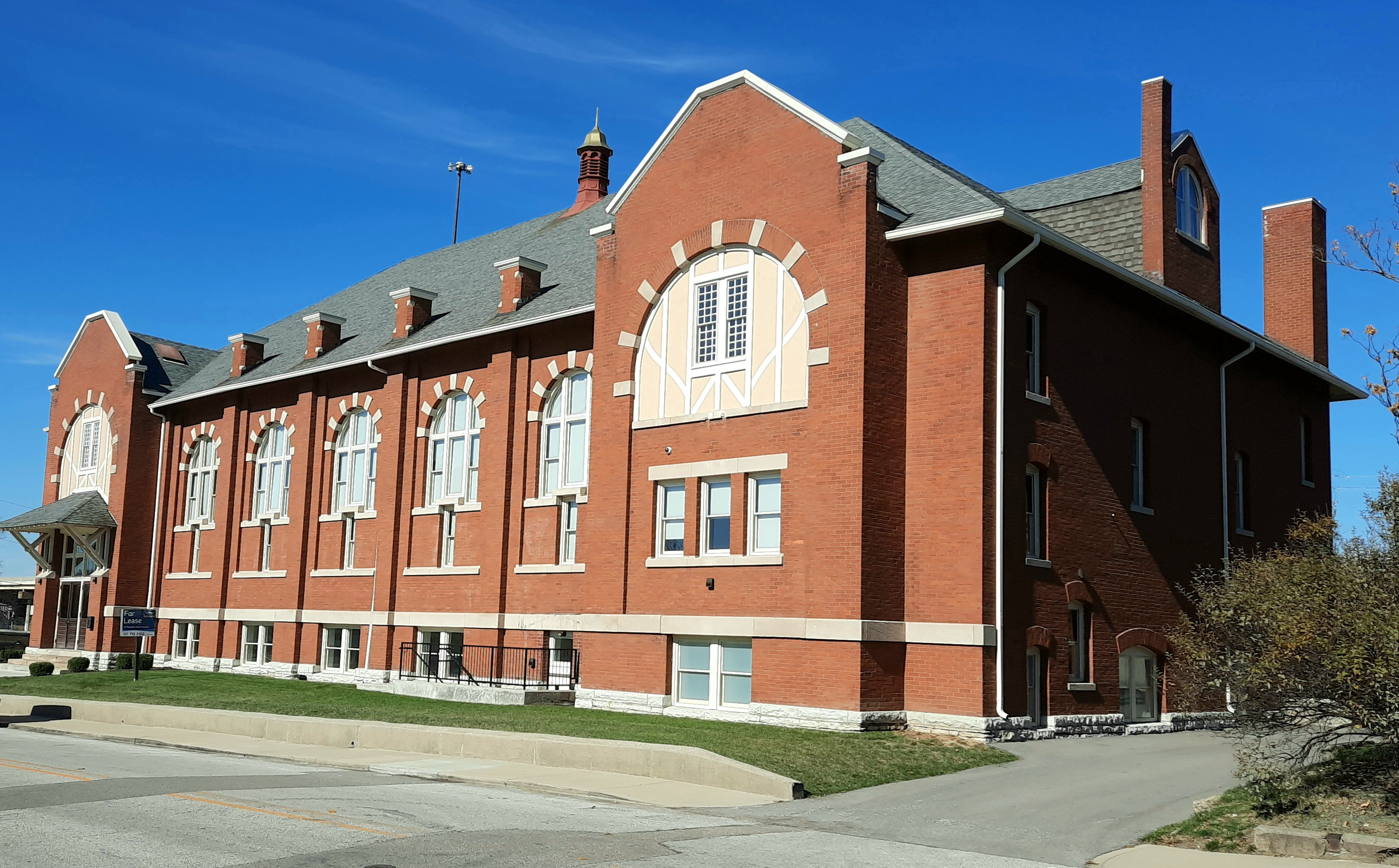
- South Side Turnverein Hall, 2020

- Location within Indianapolis Location within Indiana Location within the United States
- Location: 306 Prospect St., Indianapolis, Indiana
- Coordinates: 39°45′09″N 86°9′12″W
- Area: 0.64 acres (0.26 ha)
- Built: 1900
- Architect: Vonnegut & Bohn
- Architectural style: Renaissance Revival
- NRHP reference No.: 100004724
- Added to NRHP: December 3, 2019

South Side Turnverein Hall is a historic social club and gymnasium in the Bates-Hendricks neighborhood of Indianapolis, Indiana, affiliated with the city's German-American community. lt was built in 1900 by prominent architects Vonnegut & Bohn, whose managing partners Bernard Vonnegut Sr. and Arthur Bohn were members of the burgeoning German-American community in Indianapolis. The architects were also known for designing the Athenæum (previously called Das Deutsche Haus), another German-American social club in the city. The South Side Turnverein was an important gathering place for Indianapolis' south side German community until its decline in the 1940s. It was sold to investors in 1978 to be used as an athletic club.

The building was added to the National Register of Historic Places in 2019.

== History ==
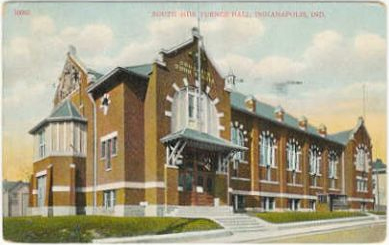
Postcard showing the South Side Turnverein Hall, 1908

Indianapolis was a major destination for German immigrants in the 19th century, spurred by political refugees leaving Europe after the failed Revolutions of 1848. By 1850, people of German heritage constituted over 12 percent of the city's population. The growing German community desired to retain their heritage, and did so through the creation of social clubs.

The Turner movement was one of the largest German-American cultural groups of the time, promoting German ideals through education and physical fitness. The Turner movement created Turnvereins (or gymnastics clubs), where members gathered for both social and athletic activities. The Turner movement arrived in Indianapolis in the 1850s with the establishment of a Turnverein organization, the Socialer Turnverein. By 1893, a growing German population on the southside of the city sought to form their own Turnverein. That year a group of around 200 German-Americans broke away from the Socialer Turnverein to establish the South Side Turnverein (Südseite Turnverein).

The group first rented a space in the Phoenix Garden, but as the organization grew it began to look for a permanent home. They selected a site near the intersection of Madison Avenue and Prospect Street. Construction began in June 1900 and was completed in November of that year. In the beginning, the South Side Turnverein Hall hosted eight turning classes with 300 students between the ages of 6 and 25. The building contained two bowling alleys, a reception and dining room, kitchen, barroom, and the gymnasium. The gymnasium could also serve as an auditorium, with space for over 800 people.

=== Sporting history ===
As an organization dedicated to physical education, the South Side Turnverein hosted many athletic events during its history. These included gymnastics expositions, basketball games, bowling leagues, and boxing matches. It hosted an annual exhibition each April, which included gymnastics performances, folk dances, and orchestral performances. It also served as a host location for many regional Turner events, bringing up to 500 athletes and large crowds from cities such as Chicago, Louisville, Fort Wayne, and Evansville.

The Turnverein fielded a basketball team and played teams from the Christamore House, Crawfordsville High School, and other local organizations. It hosted several basketball leagues, and was reported to have held more than 18,000 refereed basketball games between 1904 and 2014.

=== Social history ===
From its completion into the late-1930s the South Side Turnverein served as a fixture in the area's German community, but also the southside at large. It hosted musical performances, dances, plays, festivals, and other events. Some were focused on celebrating German heritage, while others were related to the city or other social clubs. Local chapters of the Knights of Pythias and the Young Men's Institute were among the many groups to host events at the Turnverein.

The building also hosted many labor union and political events. Local labor unions including the United German Trad Unions of Indianapolis, Printing Pressman's Union No. 17, Central Labor Union, and the State Federation of Labor used the building. It also served as a meeting place for labor negotiations in the 1940s and 1950s. A political rally for the Progressive Party was held at the Turnverein in 1912. The building even hosted a campaign appearance by John F. Kennedy during his 1960 presidential run.

=== Decline ===
Anti-German sentiment, fostered by World War I and World War II, spread throughout the United States in the first half of the 20th century. German-American organizations were forced to respond. In 1918, the South Side Turnverein hosted a meeting of "persons of German blood" where resolutions were passed supporting the United States in its war against Kaiser Wilhelm II of Germany. The building's name was Anglicized around the same time, and was commonly referred to as the South Side Turner Hall or South Side Turners' Gymnasium throughout the inter-war and post-war years.

In the late-1930s, the South Side Turnverein's membership was around 400 people. By 1977, that number had dropped to 62 members. The surrounding neighborhood had changed since the building's completion, and many former members relocated to the Indianapolis suburbs. White flight and the construction of Interstate 70 immediately to the north of the building in the 1970s contributed to the demise of the organization. In December 1978, the Turnverein building was sold to investors and the organization's operations were moved.

After the sale of the building it was used at various times as an athletic club, bar, and music venue. Most recently it was converted into office space.

== Architecture ==
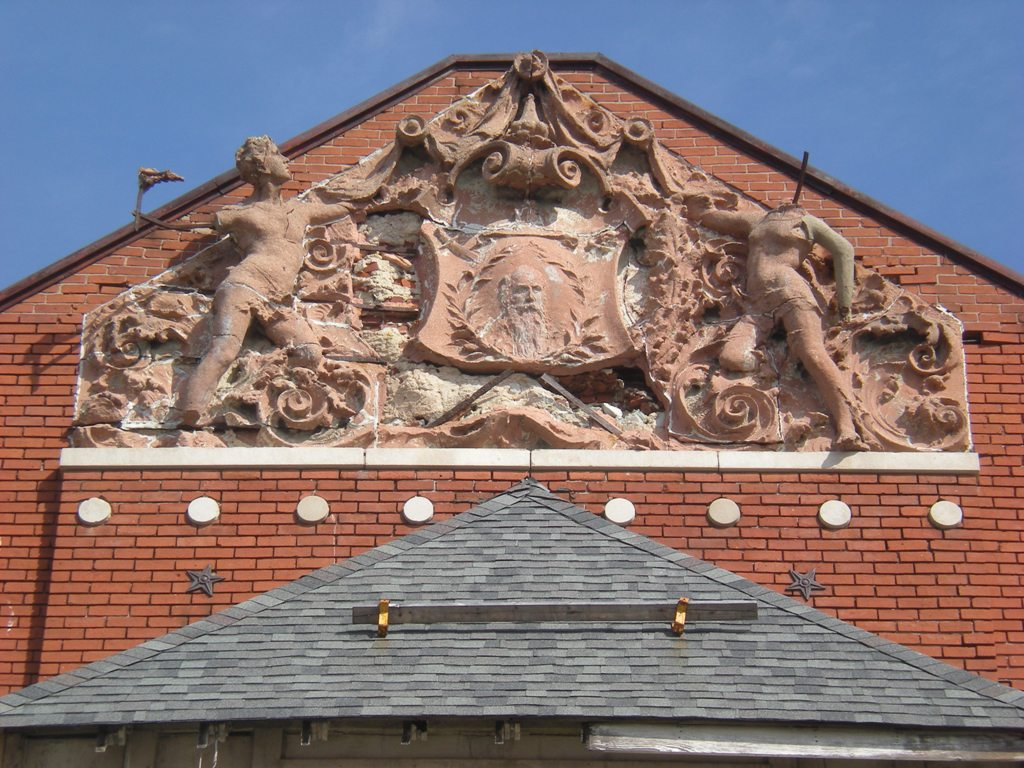
Schwarz relief on the building's west gable, 2010

The German Renaissance Revival structure is a two-story building with a raised basement on a limestone foundation. Its exterior consists of red brick with limestone trim. It has a hipped roof with gabled pavilions. There are brick pilasters on its south façade, which extend through the roof. An octagonal cupola sits on the ridge of the roof.

A prominent feature of the building is the arched windows and panels on its north and south façades. At the center are five groups of single one-over-one windows on the first floor aligned with a three-part arched window on the second floor. The arches feature distinctive limestone voussoirs and springers. The pavilions have a similar arched panel on their north and south façades. These panels consist of half-timbering and stucco with a pair of 15-over-15 windows in their center. They share the same arched design as the windows in the central section of the façades.

The west-facing gable features a relief portrait of Friedrich Ludwig Jahn, the father of the Turner Movement, by noted sculptor Rudolf Schwarz. Schwarz was also known for his work on the Soldiers' and Sailors' Monument in downtown Indianapolis. The original relief suffered extensive damage over its lifetime and was replaced by a reconstruction during the building's renovations in 2019. The remaining components of the original relief are on display inside the building.

== See also ==
- National Register of Historic Places listings in Center Township, Marion County, Indiana
