= William Orton Williams =

Confederate spy during the American Civil War

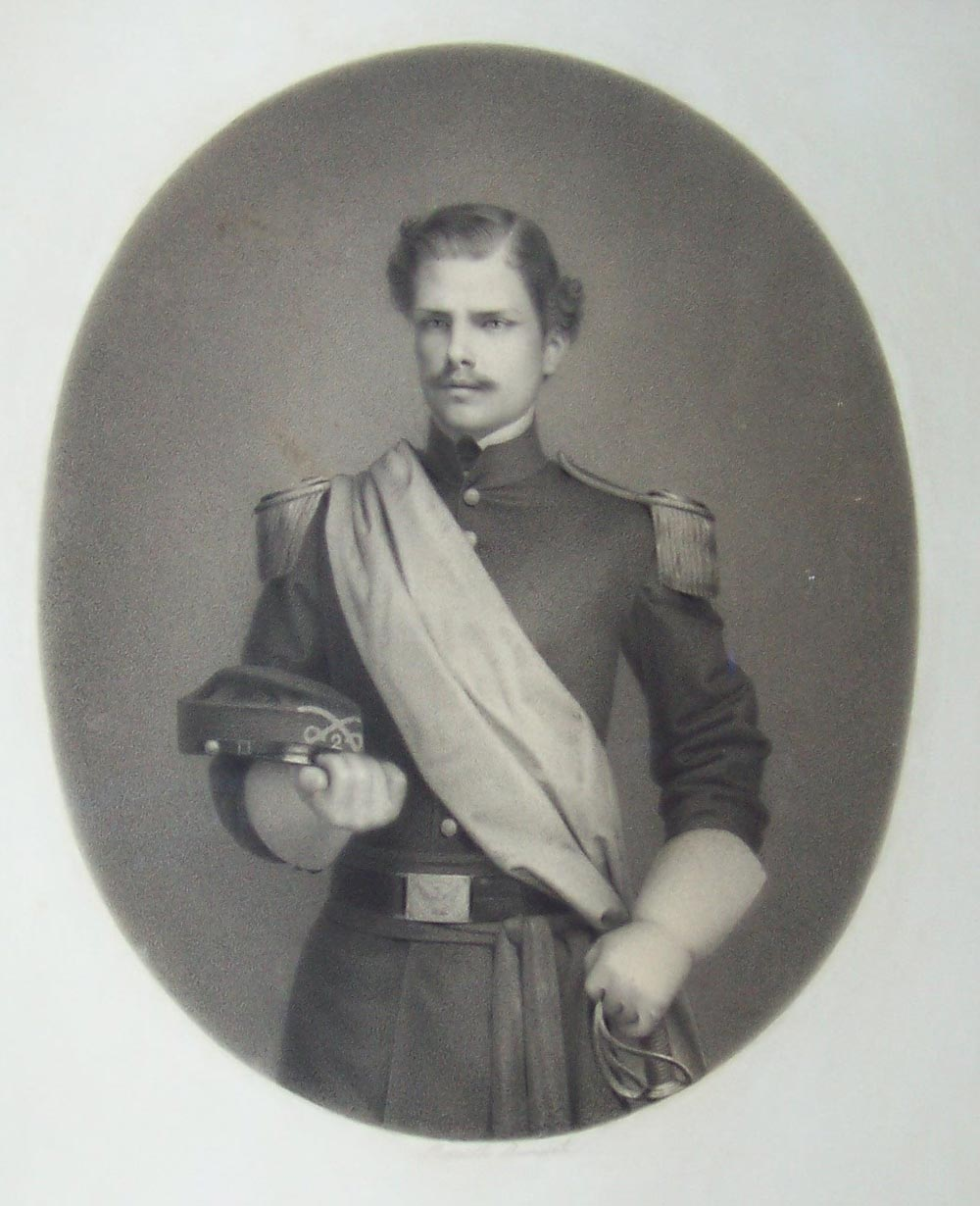
- Second Lieutenant Williams, US Army 1861
- Born: July 7, 1839; Buffalo, New York, U.S.
- Died: June 9, 1863 (aged 23); Franklin, Tennessee, U.S.
- Cause of death: Execution by hanging
- Burial place: Oak Hill Cemetery; Washington, D.C., U.S.
- Other name: Lawrence Williams Orton
- Relatives: Mary Anna Custis Lee (cousin)
- Military career
- Allegiance: United States of America (Confederate States of America) Confederate States
- Branch: United States Army; Confederate Army
- Service years: 1861 (USA), 1861–1863 (CSA)
- Rank: First Lieutenant (USA); Colonel (CSA)
- Nickname: Bunny
- Conflicts: American Civil War

William Orton Williams, (July 7, 1839 – June 9, 1863) called Orton Williams until he changed his name to Lawrence Williams Orton, was a Confederate officer during the American Civil War who, after being caught behind Union lines in a U.S. Army uniform, was executed as a spy.

== Early life ==
Orton Williams was the son of Captain William G. Williams, an officer in the Corps of Topographical Engineers, and America Pinckney Peters Williams. Captain Williams died of wounds sustained in the Battle of Monterey in 1846 and, as his wife had predeceased him, young Orton was raised by his sister Martha Custis Williams. A cousin of Mary Lee, the wife of Confederate General Robert E. Lee, Orton spent many days of his youth at Arlington House, playing as a child and waiting upon Eleanor Agnes Lee, Robert E. Lee's third daughter, as a young man. He studied at the Episcopal High School in Alexandria, Virginia.

== U.S. Army ==
In 1859, Williams served as a civilian employee of the Corps of Engineers, for the survey of Minnesota. He was later appointed aid in the United States Coast Survey. In 1861 Williams was, on Robert E. Lee's recommendation, commissioned second lieutenant in Second United States Cavalry, Lee's regiment, direct from civil life. Promoted to first lieutenant the same year, Lieutenant Williams served as aide-de-camp to General Winfield Scott in Washington. After the outbreak of the Civil War he tendered his resignation from the U.S. Army; Scott offered him an instructorship at West Point that would have let him remain in the army, but not having to fight his family and friends. When Williams insisted on leaving the army, he was arrested on suspicion of having passed classified information to the Confederates, but was released after a few weeks. His brother Lawrence, who was a captain in the Tenth U.S. Infantry, remained in the U.S. Army.

== Confederate Army ==
After joining the Confederate army, Williams was transferred to the West and served as an aide to General Leonidas Polk, fighting at the Battle of Shiloh. William's popularity declined when he killed an insubordinate private soldier and he was transferred to the artillery under the command of Braxton Bragg. There he changed his name to Lawrence Williams Orton, as he said because his brother remained in the Union army, but perhaps to wipe out the stains of the ugly killing. On leave in Virginia, at Christmas 1862, Williams proposed to Eleanor Agnes Lee, but was rejected. Shortly thereafter he married another woman, possibly a Mrs. Lamb, who according to rumors already was married.

== Death ==
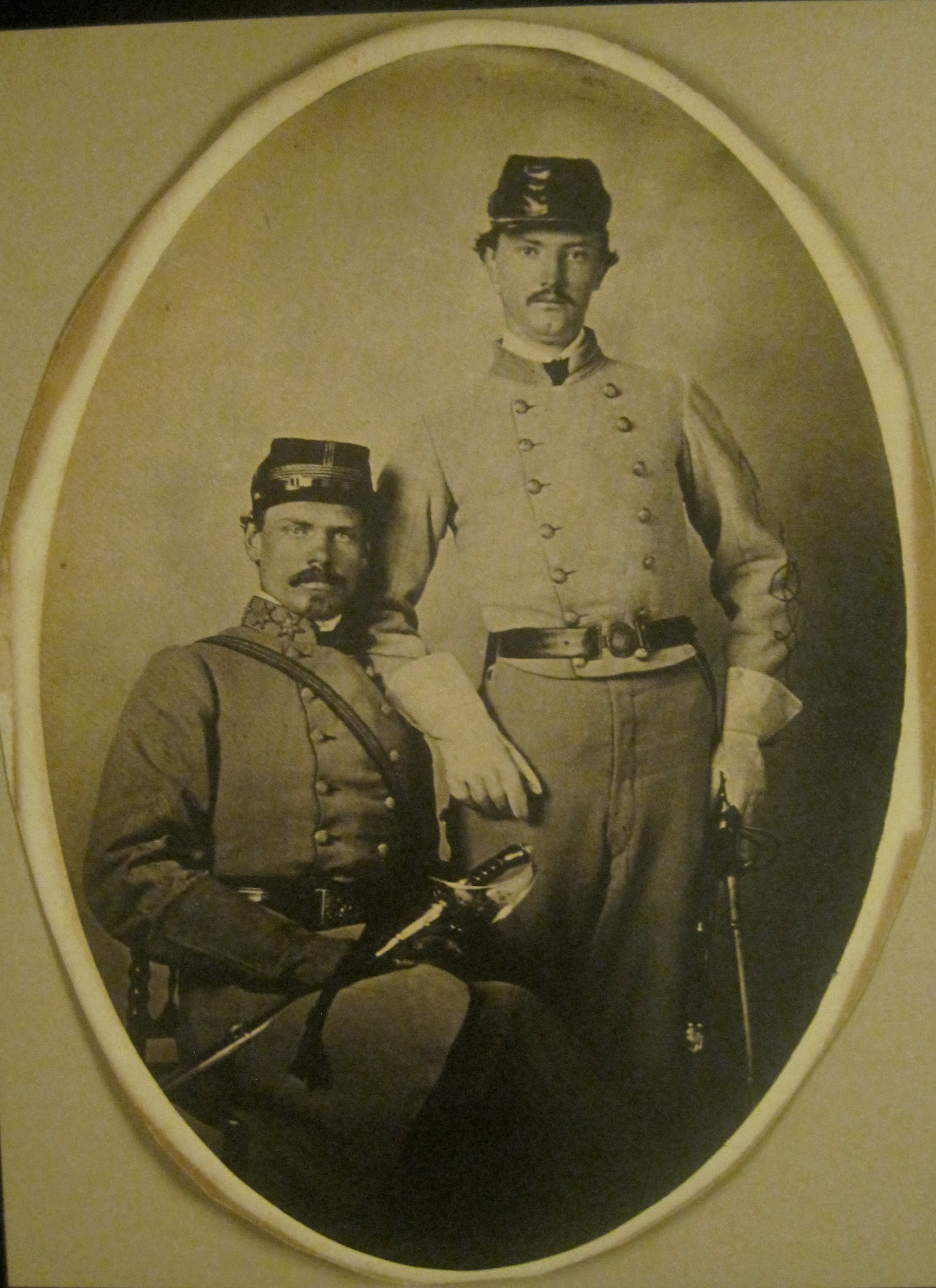
Colonel Orton (seated) and Lieutenant Peter (standing).

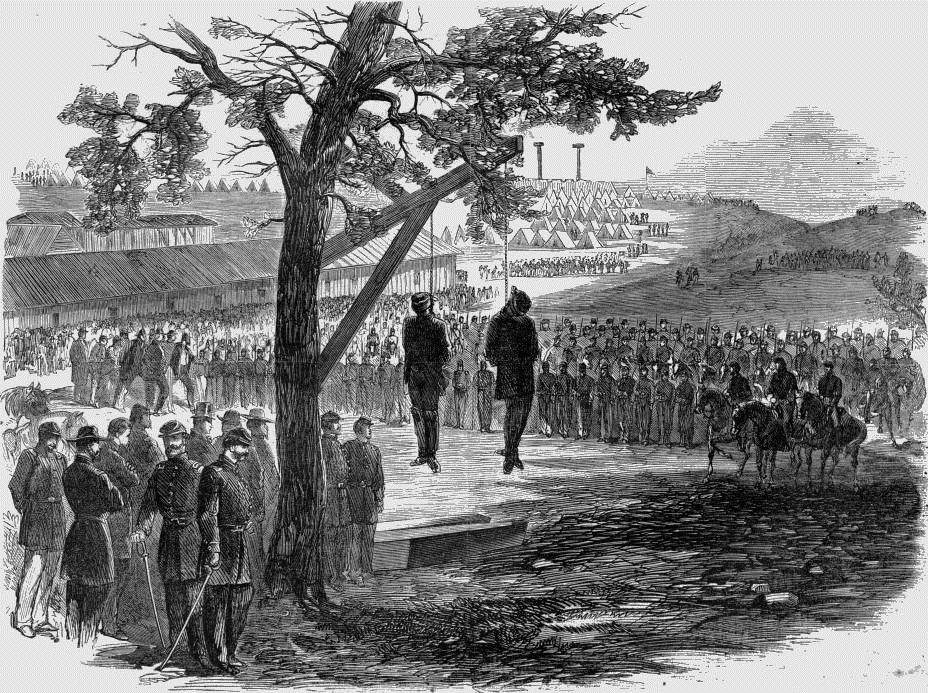
Hanging of Colonel Orton and Lieutenant Peter 1863.

On June 8, 1863 Colonel Orton and his cousin, Lieutenant Walter G. Peter, were arrested by the US Army. They were behind Union lines in Franklin, Tennessee, and were dressed as officers in the Union Army, traveled under false names, and carried falsified papers claiming that they were inspectors of the U.S. Army. Under questioning, the two gave their real names to the federal commandant, Colonel John P. Baird, of the 85th Indiana Volunteer Infantry. Baird was instructed by General William Rosecrans to have them immediately tried by court-martial. A court was convened at short notice, sat during the night, and at three o'clock in the morning of June 9, found the accused guilty of being spies. Rosecrans rejected pleads of clemency and ordered their immediate execution, which was carried out by hanging about six hours after the verdict. The nature of Orton's mission is unclear. Orton claimed that both officers were under their way to Canada and Europe, purportedly in some secret mission for the Confederacy. The execution of Orton dismayed Robert E. Lee; although he conceded that the officers were technically in violation of the laws of war, he believed that clemency should have been shown. Agnes Lee was deeply taken by the death of Orton; it was a trauma from which she never recovered, and it came only year after the death of her beloved sister Annie.

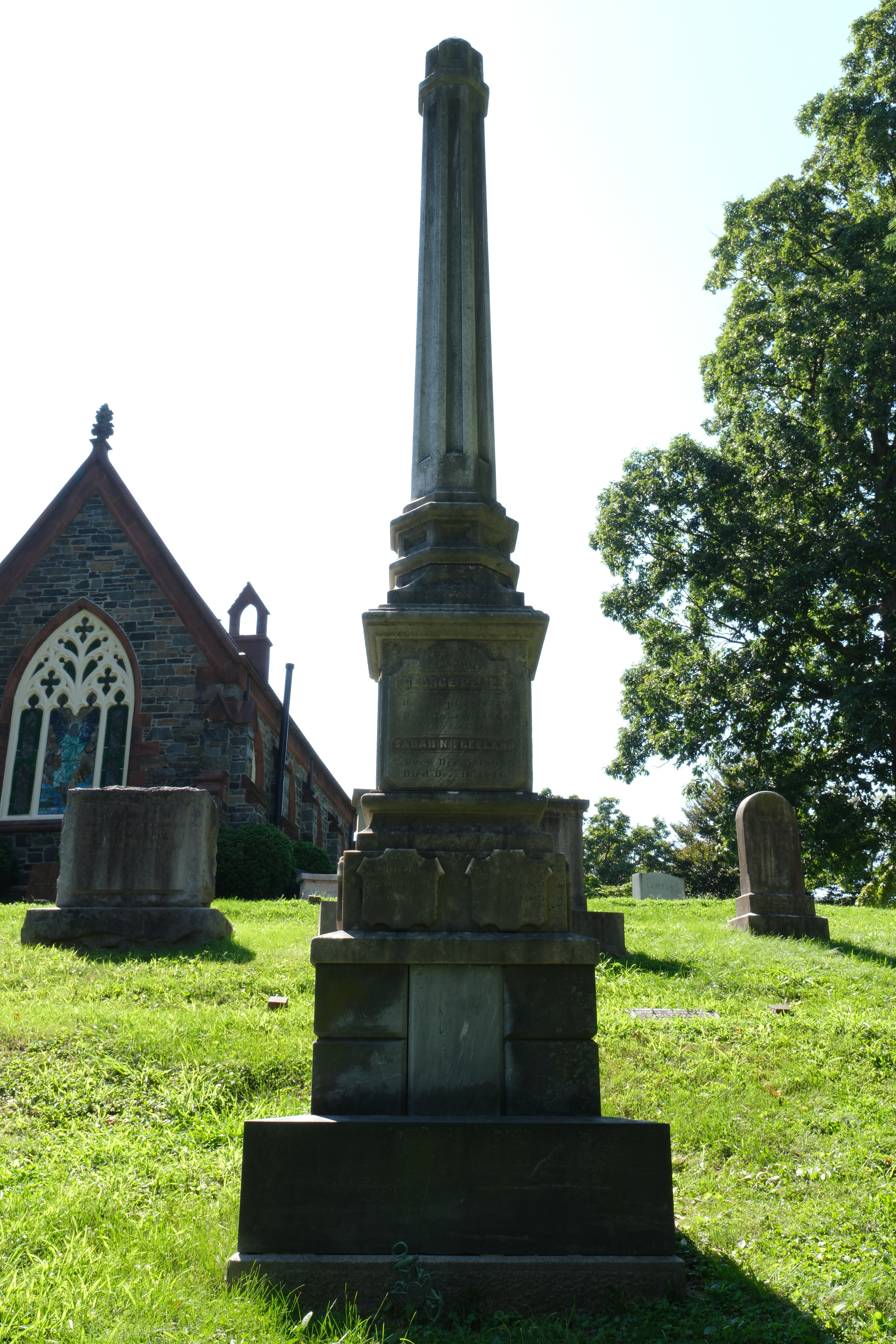
Grave of Williams and Walter Gibson Peter at Oak Hill Cemetery

Williams was interred alongside Peter at Oak Hill Cemetery in Washington, D.C.
