= Play (Jonker) =

Abstract sculpture by Lars Jonker

Coordinates: 39°45′2.89″N 86°9′14.32″W

- Artist: Lars Jonker
- Year: 2002
- Type: Painted Metal
- Location: Hendricks Park; Indianapolis, Indiana, United States

Play is an abstract sculpture by Lars Jonker. It is located in Hendricks Park, in the historic Bates-Hendricks neighborhood, south of downtown Indianapolis, Indiana.

== Description ==
The painted-metal sculpture consists of two large, curvilinear forms facing each other. One curved form has a yellow ball and the other has a purple ball attached near their pointed extremities. A blue ball rests between the two curves on a metal platform that encompasses both arcs.

== Information ==
Lars Jonker, a local steel artist at the nearby Wheeler Arts Community, created Play for Hendricks Park, as part of the park's ongoing development. It was commissioned by Keep Indy Beautiful in 2002.

Jonker moved from his hometown of Wichita, Kansas to Indianapolis in 1998. Upon relocation, he worked as a designer for Danish Inspirations, a furniture company. He started welding after gaining experience at Danish Inspirations working on prototypes.

== Location history ==
The sculpture was installed in Hendricks Park, a collaborative project between the Bates-Hendricks Neighborhood Association, Keep Indianapolis Beautiful, Baker & Daniels, Eli Lilly and Company, and Southeast Neighborhood Development that began in 2000 and was completed in 2002. Despite occasional vandalism and some restoration, the sculpture remains in the park, on Madison Avenue, just south of downtown Indianapolis. This small park in the Bates-Hendricks neighborhood is operated by Indy Parks and owned by the City of Indianapolis.
