= Charles Rankin Deniston =

American politician

Charles Rankin Deniston (1835–?) was a member of the Wisconsin State Assembly in 1874 and 1875.

Deniston was born in 1835 in Green County, Wisconsin, the son of John W. Deniston and Elizabeth Van Sant. He attended Mount Morris College and Lawrence University. During the American Civil War, he visited the 22nd Wisconsin Volunteer Infantry Regiment in 1863 and was captured by the Confederates at Brentwood, Tennessee. He married Susan C. Coryell (1838–1873), and after her death married a second time in 1877 to Hattie M. Bramhall (1859–1941).
