= 33rd Indiana Infantry Regiment =

33rd Regiment Indiana Infantry
- Active: September 16, 1861 – July 21, 1865
- Country: United States
- Allegiance: Union
- Branch: Infantry
- Engagements: Battle of Camp Wildcat; Battle of Thompson's Station; Battle of Brentwood; Tullahoma Campaign; Atlanta campaign Battle of Resaca; Battle of Kennesaw Mountain; Battle of Peachtree Creek; Siege of Atlanta; Sherman's March to the Sea; Carolinas campaign Battle of Bentonville

The 33rd Regiment Indiana Infantry was an infantry regiment that served in the Union Army during the American Civil War.

== Service ==
The 33rd Indiana Infantry was organized at Indianapolis, Indiana and mustered in for a three-year enlistment on September 16, 1861, under the command of Colonel John Coburn.

The regiment was attached to Attached to Thomas' Command, Army of the Ohio, to November 1861. 1st Brigade, Army of the Ohio, to December 1861. 1st Brigade, 1st Division, Army of the Ohio, to February 1862. 27th Brigade, 7th Division, Army of the Ohio, to October 1862. 1st Brigade, 3rd Division, Army of Kentucky, Department of the Ohio, to February 1863. Coburn's Brigade, Baird's Division, Army of Kentucky, Department of the Cumberland, to June 1863. 3rd Brigade, 1st Division, Reserve Corps, Army of the Cumberland, to October 1863. Coburn's Brigade, Post of Murfreesboro, Tennessee, Department of the Cumberland, to January 1864. 2nd Brigade, 1st Division, XI Corps, Army of the Cumberland, to April 1864. 2nd Brigade, 3rd Division, XX Corps, Army of the Cumberland, to July 1865.

The 33rd Indiana Infantry mustered out of service July 21, 1865, at Louisville, Kentucky.

== Detailed service ==
In September 1861, the regiment was relocated to Louisville, Kentucky. Following this move, the regiment was stationed at Camp Dick Robinson, Kentucky, where it was engaged in duty until October 13. On that date, the regiment proceeded to Camp Wildcat, Kentucky, where it remained stationed.

The regiment's involvement in significant actions began with the Battle of Camp Wildcat on October 21. Subsequently, the regiment was stationed at Crab Orchard, Kentucky, from November 15, 1861, to January 3, 1862. During this period, it participated in operations centered around Mill Springs and Somerset, Kentucky, which took place from December 1 to 13, 1861.

From January 3 to April 11, 1862, the regiment was stationed in Lexington, Kentucky. The following months marked the Cumberland Gap Campaign, which unfolded from March 28 to June 18. During this campaign, the regiment occupied Cumberland Gap from June 18 to September 17. It subsequently executed a retreat to the Ohio River, a movement that took place from September 17 to October 3.

The regiment was stationed at various locations in Kentucky, including Covington, Lexington, Nicholasville, and Danville, from January 26, 1863. Later, it underwent a series of moves, including transfers to Louisville, Kentucky, and Nashville, Tennessee, from January 26 to February 7. On February 21, the regiment moved to Franklin, where it participated in the action on March 4. The Battle of Thompson's Station unfolded from March 4 to 5, during which a significant portion of the regiment was captured by Van Dorn's forces, numbering around 6,400.

The regiment was subsequently exchanged on May 5, 1863. Later engagements included actions at Brentwood on March 25 (as a detachment) and the Tullahoma Campaign from June 23 to July 7. Duty at various locations, such as Guy's Gap and Murfreesboro, continued until September 5.

The regiment's movements included being stationed at Manchester, Estill Springs, Cowan, Dechard, Tracy City, Christiana City, and along the Nashville & Chattanooga Railroad until April 1864. It was during this time that the regiment reenlisted at Christiana City in January 1864, followed by a veteran furlough in February and March.

The Atlanta Campaign took place from May 1 to September 8. During this campaign, the regiment participated in demonstrations on Rocky Faced Ridge from May 8 to 11, the Battle of Resaca from May 14 to 15, and the Advance on Dallas from May 22 to 25.

In late May, the regiment participated in the Battle of New Hope Church on May 25. From May 25 to June 5, it was involved in operations along the line of Pumpkin Vine Creek and engaged in battles around Dallas, New Hope Church, and Allatoona Hills. In the subsequent weeks, the regiment took part in operations around Marietta and against Kennesaw Mountain, spanning from June 10 to July 2.

Specific engagements during this time included Pine Hill from June 11 to 14, Lost Mountain from June 15 to 17, and the engagement at Gilgal or Golgotha Church on June 15. Further actions included Muddy Creek on June 17 and Noyes Creek on June 19. The regiment was also present at the Battle of Kolb's Farm on June 22 and the assault on Kennesaw Mountain on June 27.

As July arrived, the regiment was engaged in actions at Ruff's Station and Smyrna Camp Ground on July 4. Operations along the Chattahoochee River took place from July 5 to 17, followed by the Battle of Peachtree Creek on July 19 and 20. The regiment then participated in the Siege of Atlanta from July 22 to August 25.

In late August and early September, operations continued at Chattahoochee River Bridge from August 26 to September 2. Following this, the regiment occupied Atlanta from September 2 to November 15.

As autumn set in, the regiment participated in actions including the engagement on McDonough Road near Atlanta on November 6. By mid-November, the regiment embarked on the March to the Sea, a campaign that extended from November 15 to December 10. During this time, it participated in the Siege of Savannah, which unfolded from December 10 to 21.

In the following year, the regiment was part of the Carolinas Campaign, a significant military operation spanning from January to April 1865. The regiment was present at Lawtonville, South Carolina, on February 2, and participated in the Battle of Fayetteville, North Carolina, on March 11. Further engagements included Averysboro from March 16 to 19, and the Battle of Bentonville from March 19 to 21.

As spring approached, the regiment participated in the occupation of Goldsboro on March 24, followed by the Advance on Raleigh from April 10 to 14. It then took part in the occupation of Raleigh on April 14, and later, Bennett's House on April 26, culminating in the surrender of General Johnston and his army.

The regiment subsequently embarked on a march to Washington, D.C., via Richmond, Virginia, from April 29 to May 20. The Grand Review of the Armies took place on May 24. Following these events, the regiment was ordered to Louisville, Kentucky, in June and remained on duty there until July 21.

== Casualties ==
The regiment lost a total of 298 men during service; 4 officers and 112 enlisted men killed or mortally wounded, 2 officers and 180 enlisted men died of disease.

At the Battle of Thompson's Station, March 5, 1863, losses were 13 killed, 85 wounded, 407 captured, total 505.

== Commanders ==
- Colonel John Coburn
- Colonel James Ellis Burton

== See also ==
- List of Indiana Civil War regiments
- Indiana in the Civil War
