= 22nd Wisconsin Infantry Regiment =

Union Army infantry regiment

- Flag of Wisconsin
- Active: September 2, 1862 – June 12, 1865
- Country: United States
- Allegiance: Union
- Branch: Infantry
- Size: Regiment
- Nickname: "Abolition Regiment"
- Engagements: American Civil War: Middle Tennessee Operations; Battle of Thompson's Station; Atlanta campaign; Battle of Resaca; Battle of Adairsville; Battle of New Hope Church; Battle of Dallas; Battle of Kennesaw Mountain; Savannah Campaign; Carolinas campaign; Battle of Bentonville

Commanders
- Colonel: William L. Utley
- Lt. Colonel: Edward Bloodgood

The 22nd Wisconsin Infantry Regiment (nicknamed the "Abolition Regiment") was a volunteer infantry regiment from Wisconsin that served in the Union Army during the American Civil War. It was commanded by Colonel William L. Utley, a politician and former Adjutant General of Wisconsin. His second-in-command was Lt. Colonel Edward Bloodgood, with whom he would eventually feud bitterly.

== Service ==
Organized at Racine, Wis., and mustered on September 2, 1862. Left State for Cincinnati, Ohio, September 16, thence moved to Covington, Ky., September 22. Attached to 2nd Brigade, 1st Division, Army of Kentucky, Dept. of the Ohio, to November, 1862. 1st Brigade, 3rd Division, Army of Kentucky, to February, 1863. Coburn's Brigade, Baird's Division, Army of Kentucky, Dept. of the Cumberland, to June, 1863. 3rd Brigade, 1st Division, Reserve Corps, Army of the Cumberland, to October, 1863. Coburn's Unattached Brigade, Dept. of the Cumberland, to December, 1863. Post of Murfreesboro, District of Nashville, Dept. of the Cumberland, to January, 1864. 2nd Brigade, 1st Division, 11th Army Corps, Army of the Cumberland, to April, 1864. 2nd Brigade, 3rd Division, 20th Army Corps, Army of the Cumberland, to June, 1865.

SERVICE.--March from Covington to Georgetown, Lexington, Sandersville and Nicholasville October 7-November 13, 1862. Duty at Nicholasville until December 12. Moved to Danville, Ky., December 12 and duty there until January. 26, 1863. Moved to Louisville, Ky.; thence to Nashville, Tenn., January 26-February 7, 1863, and to Brentwood Station February 21, thence to Franklin. Reconnaissance toward Thompson's Station, Spring Hill, March 3–5. Action at Thompson's Station March 4–5. (Nearly 200 of Regiment captured by Bragg's Cavalry forces under Van Dorn, nearly 18,000 strong.) Ordered to Brentwood Station March 8. Action at Little Harpeth, Brentwood, March 25. Regiment surrounded and surrendered to Nathan Bedford Forrest. Exchanged May 5. Regiment reorganizing at St. Louis until June 12. Ordered to Nashville, Tenn., June 12, thence to Franklin June 22; to Murfreesboro, Tenn., July 3, and garrison duty there until February, 1864. Moved to Nashville, Tenn., February 24, and duty there until April. March to Lookout Valley, Tenn., April 19–28. Atlanta (Ga.) Campaign May 1 to September 8. Battle of Resaca May 14–15. Cassville May 19. Now Hope Church May 25. Operations on line of Pumpkin Vine Creek and battles about Dallas, New Hope Church and Allatoona Hills May 25-June 5. Operations about Marietta and against Kenesaw Mountain June 10-July 2. Pine Hill June 11–14. Lost Mountain June 15–17. Gilgal or Golgotha Church June 15. Muddy Creek June 17. Noyes Creek June 19. Kolb's Farm June 22. Assault on Kenesaw June 27. Ruff's Station July 4. Chattahoochie River July 5–17. Peach Tree Creek July 19–20. Siege of Atlanta July 22-August 25. Operations at Chattahoochie River Bridge August 26-September 2. Occupation of Atlanta September 2-November 15. March to the sea November 15-December 10. Siege of Savannah December 10–21. Campaign of the Carolinas January to April 1865. Lawtonville, S.C., February 2. Taylor's Hole Creek, Averysboro, N. C., March 16. Battle of Bentonville March 19–21. Occupation of Goldsboro March 24. Advance on Raleigh April 10–14. Occupation of Raleigh April 14. Bennett's House April 26. Surrender of Johnston and his army. March to Washington, D.C., via Richmond, Va., April 29-May 19. Grand Review May 24. Mustered out June 12, 1865.

Organization of Regiment.
Company	Earliest Moniker	Primary Place of Recruitment	Earliest Captain
A	Racine Company	Racine Racine County and Juneau County	George R. Williamson
B	Beloit Company	Beloit, Rock County and Walworth County	Thomas P. Northrop
C	Geneva Company	Geneva, Walworth County and Iowa County	Charles W. Smith
D	Delavan Company	Delavan, Darien, Richmond, and Walworth County	Alphonso G. Kellam
E	Janesville Company	Janesville, Fulton, Milton, Dane County, and Rock County	Isaac Miles
F	Racine Company	Racine and Racine County	Owen Griffith
G	Monroe Company	Monroe, Jefferson, Argyle, Cadiz, and Green County	James Bintliff
H	Racine Company	Raymond, Caledonia, Mount Pleasant, Burlington, and Racine County	Gustavus Goodrich
I	Beloit Company	Beloit, Allen's Grove, Richmond, Rock County and Walworth County	Warren Hodgdon
K	Monroe Company	Juda, Sylvester, Monroe, Spring Grove, Jefferson, and Green County	Lester Perkins

== Casualties ==
The 22nd Wisconsin suffered 2 officers and 75 enlisted men killed in action or who later died of their wounds, plus another 3 officers and 163 enlisted men who died of disease, for a total of 243 fatalities.

== Notable people ==
- Dwight Sidney Allen was enlisted in Co. C, rose to the rank of corporal. After the war he served in the Wisconsin Legislature.
- James Bintliff was captain of Co. G and was later made colonel of the 38th Wisconsin Infantry Regiment. After the war, he received an honorary brevet to brigadier general. He later became involved in the newspaper business and was an owner of the Janesville Gazette.
- Caleb S. Blanchard was 1st assistant surgeon of the regiment, but resigned due to disability in 1863. After the war he served in the Wisconsin Legislature.
- Robert Bullen, the son of John Bullen Jr., was enlisted in Co. C. Later he was commissioned a second lieutenant in the 1st Wisconsin Heavy Artillery Regiment.
- John C. Deniston, the brother of Charles Rankin Deniston, was enlisted in Co. G.
- John Edwin Holmes was quartermaster of the regiment. Before the war, he was the 1st Lieutenant Governor of Wisconsin. He was captured by the enemy at the Battle of Brentwood. He became seriously ill in prison and died two days after he was released, in May 1863.
- Evan O. Jones was first sergeant in Co. F and later sergeant major of the regiment. Discharged due to disability in September 1863, he later served in the Wisconsin Legislature.
- Alphonso G. Kellam was captain of Co. D and was later detailed to the brigade staff. After the war he became a justice of the South Dakota Supreme Court.
- William Robinson was drafted into Co. E in 1864. After the war he served in the Wisconsin Legislature.

== See also ==
- List of Wisconsin Civil War units
- Wisconsin in the American Civil War
