= 85th Indiana Infantry Regiment =

85th Indiana Volunteer Infantry Regiment
- Active: September 2, 1862, to June 12, 1865
- Country: United States
- Allegiance: Union
- Branch: Infantry
- Engagements: Atlanta campaign Battle of Resaca; Battle of Kennesaw Mountain; Battle of Peachtree Creek; Siege of Atlanta; Carolinas campaign Battle of Bentonville

The 85th Indiana Volunteer Infantry Regiment was an Infantry Regiment that served in the Union army during the American Civil War.

== Service ==
The 85th Indiana Volunteer Infantry was organized at Terre Haute, Indiana, September 2, 1862. Led by Colonel John P. Baird the regiment was ordered to Kentucky and duty at Covington, Lexington, Nicholasville, and Danville, Ky., until January 26, 1863. Attached to 1st Brigade, 2nd Division, Army of Kentucky, Department of the Ohio, September–October, 1862. 1st Brigade, 3rd Division, Army of Kentucky, Department of the Ohio, to February 1863. Coburn's Brigade, Baird's Division, Army of Kentucky, Department of the Cumberland, to June 1863. 3rd Brigade, 1st Division, Reserve Corps, Army of the Cumberland, to October 1863. Coburn's unattached Brigade, Post Murfreesboro, Tennessee, Department of the Cumberland, to January 1864. 2nd Brigade, 1st Division, XI Corps, Army of the Cumberland, to April 1864. 2nd Brigade, 3rd Division, XX Corps, Army of the Cumberland, to June 1865.

== Detailed Service ==
Moved to Louisville, Kentucky, then to Nashville, Tennessee, January 26-February 1. Moved to Brentwood Station, Tenn., February 21, then to Franklin. Action at Franklin March 4, and at Thompson's Station, Spring Hill, March 4–5. Regiment captured by Van Dorn, commanding Bragg's cavalry forces, nearly 18,000 strong. Exchanged May 5, 1863. Regiment reorganizing at Indianapolis, Indiana, till June 12. Ordered to Nashville, Tenn., June 12, and guard duty along Nashville & Chattanooga Railroad at Franklin and Murfreesboro until April 1864. Garrison's Creek near Fosterville and Christiana October 6, 1863 (detachment). March to Lookout Valley, Tenn., April 20–28. Atlanta, Georgia Campaign. Demonstration on Rocky Faced Ridge May 8–11. Battle of Resaca May 14–15. Cassville May 19. Advance on Dallas May 22–25. New Hope Church May 25. Operations on line of Pumpkin Vine Creek and battles about Dallas, New Hope Church and Allatoona Hills May 25-June 5. Pine Mount June 5. Operations about Marietta and against Kennesaw Mountain June 10-July 2. Pine Hill June 11–14. Lost Mountain June 15–17. Gilgal or Golgotha Church June 15. Muddy Creek June 17. Noyes Creek June 19. Kolb's Farm June 22. Assault on Kennesaw June 27. Ruff's Station, Smyrna Camp Ground, July 4. Chattahoochie River July 5–17. Peach Tree Creek July 19–20. Siege of Atlanta July 22-August 25. Operations at Chattahoochie River Bridge August 26-September 2. Occupation of Atlanta September 2-November 15. March to the sea November 15-December 10. Siege of Savannah December 10–21. Campaign of the Carolinas January to April 1865. Lawtonville, S.C., February 2. Battle of Bentonville, N.C., March 19–21. Occupation of Goldsboro March 24. Advance on Raleigh April 10–14. Occupation of Raleigh April 14. Bennett's House April 26. Surrender of Johnston and his army. March to Washington, D. C., via Richmond, Va., April 29-May 19. Grand Review of the Armies May 24. Mustered out June 12, 1865.

== Casualties ==
The regiment lost during service 2 officers and 40 enlisted men killed and mortally wounded and 3 officers and 190 enlisted men by disease for a total of 235 casualties.

== Commanders ==
- Colonel John P. Baird, remained as commandant of Franklin in 1863 while the regiment was reorganized in Indianapolis. During that time he was seminal in discovering two Confederate officers in Union Army uniforms; both of which subsequently were hanged as spies. Resigned his position on July 20, 1864 after a breakdown.
- Colonel Alexander B. Crane who previously served as lieutenant-colonel under Baird and succeeded to the command.

== See also ==
- List of Indiana Civil War regiments
- Indiana in the Civil War
