= 19th Michigan Infantry Regiment =

- Active: September 5, 1862, to June 10, 1865
- Country: United States
- Allegiance: Union
- Branch: Infantry
- Engagements: Battle of Thompson's Station; Battle of Resaca; Battle of Kennesaw Mountain; Siege of Atlanta; March to the Sea; Battle of Bentonville; Battle of Brentwood

The 19th Michigan Infantry Regiment was an infantry regiment that served in the Union Army during the American Civil War.

== Service ==
The 19th Michigan Infantry was mustered into Federal service at Dowagiac, Michigan, on September 5, 1862. Among the soldiers was Frank Baldwin, who would go on to become one of only nineteen men to ever receive two Medal of Honor citations, one for the Civil War and another after the war while fighting the Indians in the U.S. Cavalry.

At the Battle of Thompson's Station, March 5th, 1863, the regiment was captured. Losses were 20 killed, 92 wounded, 345 captured, total 457.

The regiment was mustered out of service on June 10, 1865.

== Total strength and casualties ==
The regiment suffered 7 officers and 88 enlisted men who were killed in action or mortally wounded and 160 enlisted men who died of disease, for a total of 255 fatalities.

== Commanders ==
- Colonel Henry C. Gilbert
- Lieutenant Colonel William R. Shafter

== See also ==
- List of Michigan Civil War Units
- Michigan in the American Civil War
