= Battle of Thompson's Station =

Battle of the American Civil War

Coordinates: 35.7980°N 86.9063°W

- Part of the American Civil War
| Date | March 5, 1863 |
| Location | Williamson County, Tennessee |
| Result | Confederate victory |

Belligerents
| United States (Union) | (Confederate States of America) CSA (Confederacy) |

Commanders and leaders
| John Coburn | Earl Van Dorn |

Units involved
| Dept. of the Cumberland | Army of Tennessee |

Strength
| 1 Reinforced Infantry Brigade | 1 Cavalry Corps |

Casualties and losses
| 1,906 | 300 |

The Battle of Thompson's Station took place during the American Civil War on March 5, 1863, in Williamson County, Tennessee.

In a period of relative inactivity following the Battle of Stones River, a reinforced Union infantry brigade, under Col. John Coburn, left Franklin to reconnoiter south toward Columbia. Four miles from Spring Hill, Coburn attacked with his right wing, a Confederate Army force composed of two regiments; he was repelled. Then, Maj. Gen. Earl Van Dorn seized the initiative. Brig. Gen. W.H. "Red" Jackson's dismounted 2nd Division made a frontal attack, while Brig. Gen. Nathan Bedford Forrest's division swept around Coburn's left flank, and into his rear. After three attempts, characterized by hard fighting, Jackson carried the Union hilltop position as Forrest captured Coburn's wagon train and blocked the road to Nashville in his rear. Out of ammunition and surrounded, Coburn surrendered, along with all but two of his field officers. Union influence in Middle Tennessee subsided for a while.

Union units involved included 19th Michigan Infantry Regiment (20 killed, 92 wounded, 345 captured, total 457) and 33rd Indiana Infantry Regiment (13 killed, 85 wounded, 407 captured, total 505).

Van Dorn and Forrest received help with their victory from an unlikely participant. Miss Alice Thompson, age 17 at the time, was sheltering in the basement of the residence of Lieutenant Banks. The 3rd Arkansas Cavalry Regiment was advancing through the yard, lost their Colonel (Samuel G. Earle) and their color bearer, and the regiment was thrown into disorder. Miss Alice Thompson rushed out, raised the flag and led the regiment to victory. The enemy lauded her action.

Despite the outcome, Forrest was angry with Van Dorn afterwards, believing the general had failed to provide sufficient support for his troops. The two argued with each other, and eventually one challenged the other to a duel, which was eventually postponed. A month later, Van Dorn was shot fatally by a man he had cuckolded, mooting the challenge.
