= Vonnegut (surname) =

Vonnegut (/ˈvɒnɪɡʌt/ VON-ig-ut) is a German-rooted surname. Vonnegut is derived from two German words, vonn(e), meaning 'by', and gut, meaning 'good'.

Notable people with the surname Vonnegut include:

- Kurt Vonnegut (1922–2007), American science fiction writer
  - Clemens Vonnegut (1824–1906), German-American businessman, great-grandfather of Kurt Vonnegut
  - Bernard Vonnegut I (1855–1908), American lecturer and architect, son of Clemens Vonnegut, Sr. and grandfather of Kurt
  - Kurt Vonnegut, Sr. (1884–1957), American architect and lecturer, son of Bernard I and father of Kurt
  - Bernard Vonnegut (1914–1997), American atmospheric scientist, elder brother of Kurt
  - Edith Vonnegut (born 1949), American painter, daughter of Kurt
  - Mark Vonnegut (born 1947), American memoirist and journalist, son of Kurt
- Norb Vonnegut (born 1958), American thriller author, fourth cousin of Kurt
