= Vonnegut (disambiguation) =

Kurt Vonnegut was an American author

Vonnegut may also refer to:

- Vonnegut (surname), various persons of that name
- 25399 Vonnegut, an asteroid named after author Kurt Vonnegut
- Vonnegut Hardware Company
