= Bernard Vonnegut I =

American architect

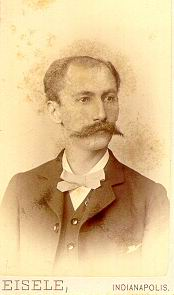
- Bernard Vonnegut I, FAIA, photographed in 1884
- Born: August 8, 1855; Indianapolis, Indiana
- Died: August 7, 1908 (aged 52); Indianapolis, Indiana
- Resting place: Crown Hill Cemetery and Arborteum Sec 6, Lot 4; 39.819945°N 86.1754066°W
- Occupation: Architect
- Known for: Partner in Vonnegut & Bohn

Bernard Vonnegut I, WAA, FAIA, (August 8, 1855 – August 7, 1908) was an American lecturer and architect active in late-nineteenth and early-twentieth-century Indiana. He was a co-founder of the locally renowned Indianapolis architectural firm of Vonnegut and Bohn, and was active in a range of residential, religious, institutional, civic, and commercial commissions. He is the namesake and grandfather of scientist Bernard Vonnegut, father of the architect Kurt Vonnegut Sr., and grandfather of author Kurt Vonnegut.

== Early life and education ==
Bernard Vonnegut I was born on August 8, 1855, in Indianapolis, Indiana, to Freethinker German-American parents Katarina Vonnegut (née Blank; 1828 – 1904), a homemaker, and Clemens Vonnegut (1824 – 1906), a powerful nineteenth-century German-American businessman in Indianapolis and founder of the Vonnegut Hardware Company.

Growing up in Indianapolis, he was described as the opposite of his father: artistic, extremely modest, retiring, unsociable, slightly introverted. "He had no intimates, and took but little part in social activities. He was never a happy...but was inclined to be reticent, shy, and somewhat contemptuous of his environment...and evidently unhappy in Indianapolis most of the time." He briefly worked for his father's firm but disliked it.

His father was on the Board of School Commissioners of the City of Indianapolis, and young Bernard attended the German-English School and Indianapolis High School with his brothers Clemens Jr., Franklin, and George. Throughout his childhood, his artistic talent was noticed. Family lore relates that he had wanted to work as a theatrical designer after becoming stagestruck, "but learned that almost no one could make a living at that--so he became an architect instead."

On the advice of his father's friend, Alexander Metzger, Vonnegut "took the course in architecture at the Massachusetts Institute of Technology and later studied at the Polytechnic Institute of Hanover (later merged into what is now Leibniz University Hannover, Germany.

After returning from Germany, he lived in New York City during the late 1870s and early 1880s, the city's "Gilded Age." He worked as a draftsman for a number of years in the offices of famous architect George B. Post. There, according to family lore, he became highly productive and more sociable. He felt his creativity and pursuit of arts were appreciated and respected in a way that they had not been in Indiana. His happiness was only interrupted when his family ordered him to return to the Midwest and his family's social circle and marry a good German girl.

== Personal life ==
Vonnegut married Nanette Schnull, the daughter of Henry Schnull and Matilde Schramm, a well-respected and wealthy German-American family in Indianapolis. The "Schnull-Vonnegut clan was slightly condescending," and considered near the top of "the pecking order in the social hierarchy of the community, and particularly in the German group...." The couple had three children: Kurt (1884–1957), Alex (b. 1888), and Irma (b. 1890). Although not active in the Indianapolis community, he was a cultured man of the arts, reading the poetry of Heine and heavily favoring German culture. The family frequently lived abroad, and sent their young sons to the American School in Strasbourg. While Nanette was educated in music and literature, she did not share most of her husband's interests and by all accounts theirs was not a happy marriage. "Kurt and Irma...identified with their father, while Alex identified with his mother."

Feeling unappreciated in Indianapolis, he returned to being silent and unsociable. He frequently suffered indigestion and headaches and died at the age of fifty-three, only two years after his father, of intestinal cancer, never living to see any of his children married.

== Professional career in Indianapolis ==
In 1886, Vonnegut was "elected a member of the Western Association of Architects," and following their consolidation with the American Institute of Architects in 1889, he became a Fellow. Additionally, he was a member of the Architectural League of America

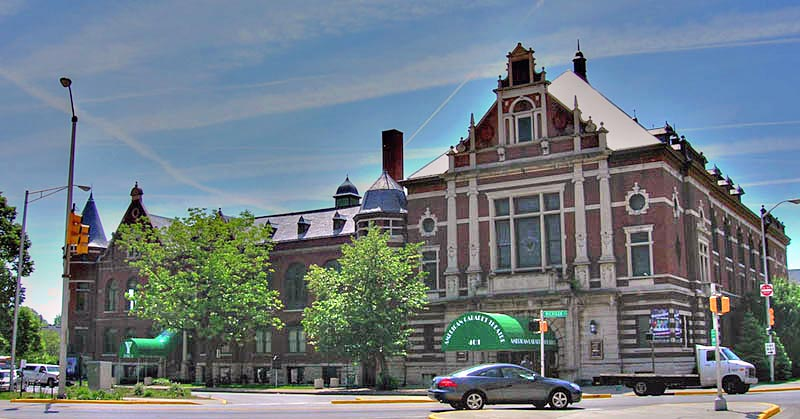
The German Renaissance Revival-style Athenæum (Das Deutsche Haus) in Indianapolis (1893–1898)

He founded his own firm in 1883 in Indianapolis before establishing the architectural firm of Vonnegut & Bohn in 1888 with Arthur Bohn (b. 1861). The firm went on to create many landmarks in Indianapolis and greater Indiana, and a number have been listed on the National Register of Historic Places.

In 1888, Julia Schnull, the sister of Vonnegut's mother, married J. George Mueller, the secretary-treasurer of the Mooney-Mueller Drug Company in Indianapolis. A Mueller (and probably descendant) joined Vonnegut & Bohn as a partner in the 1940s and the firm was briefly renamed Vonnegut, Bohn & Mueller before a 1946 merger that wiped out the latter two names.

== List of works attributed to him ==
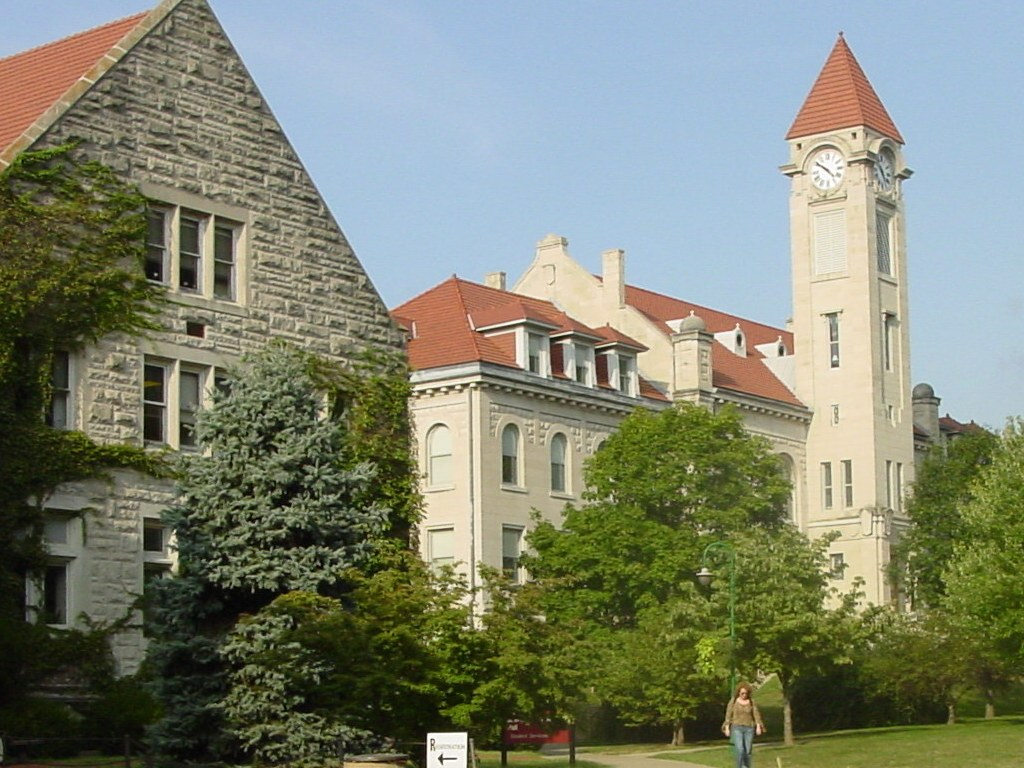
Student Building (right, listed on the National Register of Historical Places), Indiana University Bloomington

- The First Chamber of Commerce of Indianapolis
- The Athenæum (Das Deutsche Haus), 401 E. Michigan Street, German Renaissance Revival style building built in two phases—the east wing 1893–94, and the west wing, 1897–1898. Listed in 1973 on the National Register of Historic Places.(Design by Bernard Vonnegut I and Arthur Bohn)Photo of Athenæum
- William H. Block Company (Indianapolis) building (after 1910) (Design by Bernard Vonnegut I and Arthur Bohn)Photo in 1912, Photo in 1919, Photo in 1919, Photo in 1924,
- The John Herron Art Institute (Indianapolis, Indiana) (Design by Bernard Vonnegut I)

Photo of Herron Art Institute

- The L. S. Ayres Store Building (Indianapolis, Indiana) (Design by Bernard Vonnegut I)
- The Fletcher Trust Building (Indianapolis, Indiana)
- The Students Building, Indiana University Bloomington (Design by Bernard Vonnegut I)
- Delaware Street Temple (Indianapolis, Indiana) (Design by Bernard Vonnegut I)
- Shortridge High School (Indianapolis, Indiana) (Design by Bernard Vonnegut I)
- The Federal Building (Vincennes, Indiana) (Design by Bernard Vonnegut I)
