= Clemens Vonnegut =

American businessman

Clemens Vonnegut Sr.
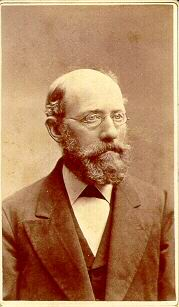
- Photograph from 1885
- Born: November 20, 1824; Münster, Westphalia, Kingdom of Prussia
- Died: December 13, 1906 (aged 82); Indianapolis, Indiana, U.S.
- Resting place: Crown Hill Cemetery and Arborteum Sec 6, Lot 4; 39.819945°N 86.1750466°W

Clemens Vonnegut Sr. (November 20, 1824 – December 13, 1906) was a German emigrant to the United States and successful businessman. He was the patriarch of the prominent German-American Vonnegut clan (later Schnull-Vonnegut) of Indiana – he was the father and grandfather of architects Bernard Vonnegut I and Kurt Vonnegut Sr., respectively, and great-grandfather of scientist Bernard Vonnegut and author Kurt Vonnegut Jr.

== Early life ==
Vonnegut was born in Münster, Westphalia, to a tax collector father who was an official for the Duke of Westphalia. Instead of continuing his university education to Ph.D. level, he decided to work as a salesman for a textile firm in Amsterdam. In 1851, at the age of 27, he emigrated to the United States, and arrived in Indianapolis in 1851. Another source states that he arrived in New York City in mid-1851.

== Vonnegut Hardware Company ==
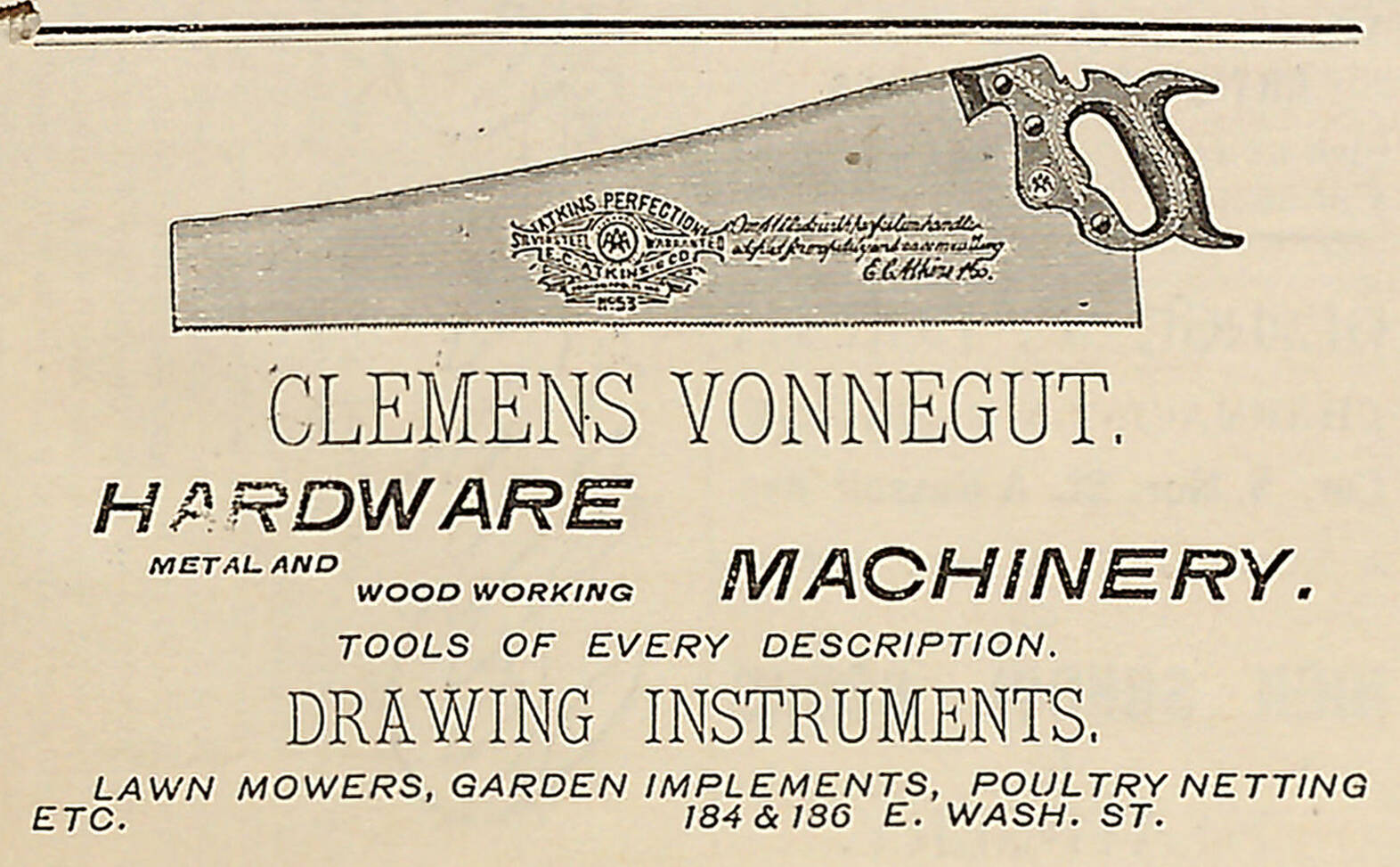
1896 advertisement for Vonnegut's hardware store.

In Indiana, he formed Vollmer & Vonnegut retail hardware and sundry merchandise store with a German immigrant named Charles Vollmer (who left for the Wild West in 1853). After 1853, the firm was renamed Vonnegut Hardware Company; the company remained under his family's control after his death.

== Personal life ==
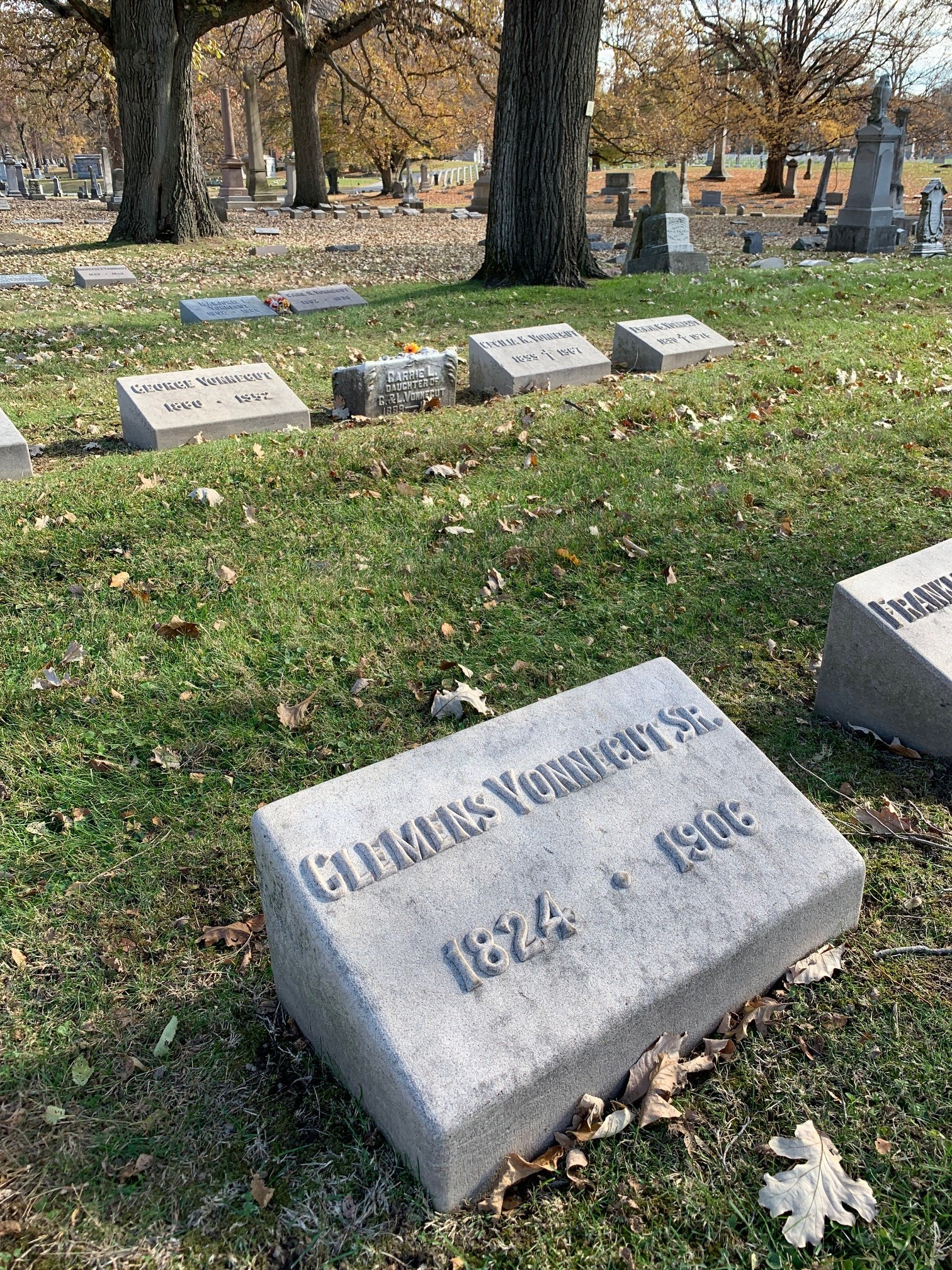
Clemens Vonnegut's gravestone at Crown Hill Cemetery and Arboretum

He married Katarina Blank in 1852 and moved to a modest house on West Market Street, Indianapolis. He had four sons: Clemens Jr., Franklin, Bernard, and George. He was the sometime chairman and chief administrative officer of the Board of School Commissioners of the City of Indianapolis. A city school was named for him. "He greatly admired Benjamin Franklin, whom he called an American saint, and named his third son after him...." He died aged 82 on December 13, 1906, in Indianapolis. He was buried March 29, 1907 at Crown Hill Cemetery in the Vonnegut family plot.

== Derivation of name ==
The family name is derived from a distant forebear who had an estate ("ein Gut" in German) on the river Funne, hence the surname Funnegut. Subsequently, Funnegut was changed to Vonnegut since Funnegut sounded too much like "funny gut" in English.
