= Arthur Bohn =

American architect

- Born: August 9, 1861
- Died: January 13, 1948 (aged 86); Indianapolis, Indiana
- Occupation: Architect
- Practice: Vonnegut and Bohn
- Buildings: Athenæum (Das Deutsche Haus); William H. Block Company; Fletcher Trust Building

Arthur Bohn, AIA, (1861–1948) was an American architect active from the 1880s to 1940s in Indiana. He was a co-founder of the Indianapolis architectural firm of Vonnegut and Bohn.

Working in Indianapolis in the 1880s, Bohn entered into a partnership in 1888 with Bernard Vonnegut Sr., WAA (from 1886), and Fellow (from 1889) to form Vonnegut & Bohn. Vonnegut had been practicing with a client roster in Indianapolis since 1883 and had previous draftsman experience in the prominent New York firm of George B. Post. He also came from a wealthy and respected family that may have led to several commissions. However, Vonnegut was not the most sociable individual and was not active in the community, which is where several commissions often originate. In addition, Vonnegut and frequently traveled and lived abroad, so Bohn was likely to have played a significant role in attracting clients and executing much of the day-to-day work, despite being overshadowed by the Vonnegut name.

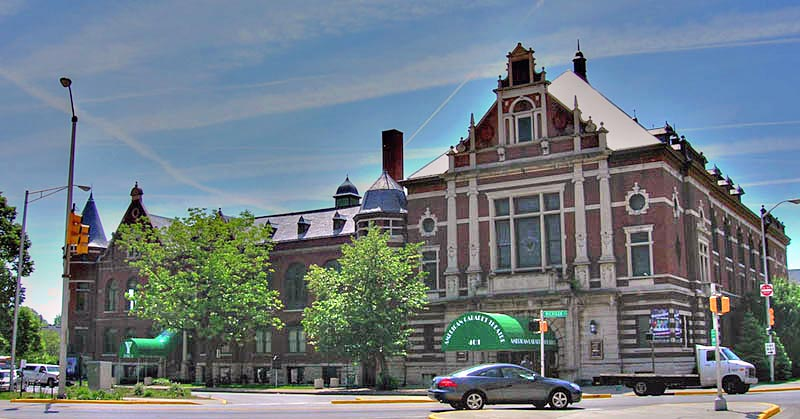
The German Renaissance Revival-style Athenæum (Das Deutsche Haus), 401 E. Michigan Street, (1893–1894 East Wing, and 1897–1898 West Wing

The firm went on to create many landmarks in Indianapolis and greater Indiana, and a number have been listed on the National Register of Historic Places Bernard Vonnegut died young in 1908 and Arthur continued the firm under the same name. Bernard's son, Kurt Vonnegut Sr. returned from Germany in 1910 and became a partner in the firm, which remained named Vonnegut & Bohn, despite Bohn's seniority.

While with the firm, he worked as a local supervising architect for Holabird & Roche's The Fletcher Trust Building (after the original designer Electus D. Litchfield was dismissed).

At some point, the firm took on an additional partner named Mueller, and the firm was renamed Vonnegut, Bohn & Mueller during the 1940s. Mueller was likely related to Vonnegut. Bohn retired in the 1940s. In 1946, a merger erased Bohn and Mueller's names from the successor firm of Vonnegut, Wright & Yeager

Bohn died in 1948 and is buried in Crown Hill Cemetery in Indianapolis (Section 36, Lot 228).

== List of works ==
- The Athenæum (Das Deutsche Haus), 401 E. Michigan Street, German Renaissance Revival style building built in two phases—the east wing 1893–94, and the west wing, 1897–1898. Listed in 1973 on the National Register of Historic Places.(Design by Bernard Vonnegut Sr. and Arthur Bohn)
- William H. Block Company building (after 1910) (Design by Bernard Vonnegut Sr. and Arthur Bohn)
- The Fletcher Trust Building (as supervising architect for the firm of Holabird & Roche)
