= Pierre & Wright =

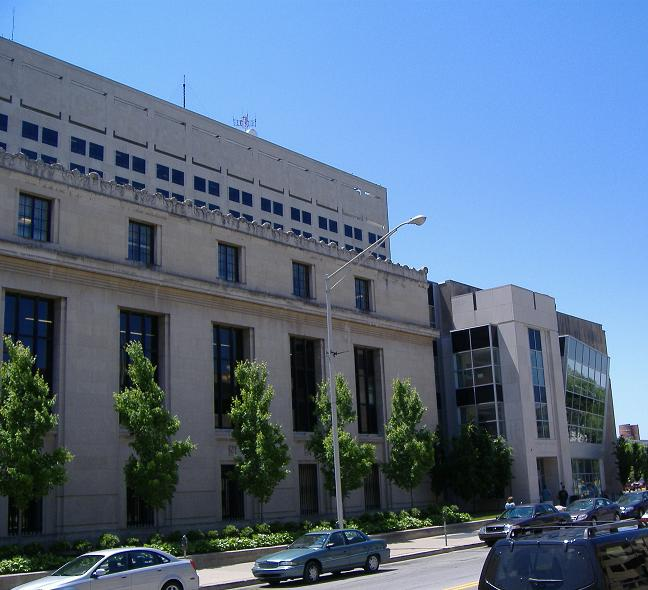
- Indiana State Library, Indianapolis, Indiana

Practice information
- Partners: Edward D. Pierre; George Caleb Wright
- Founded: 1925

Pierre and Wright was an architectural firm in Indianapolis, Indiana in the United States. It was established in 1925 by partners Edward D. Pierre, AIA (1890–1971) and George Caleb Wright, AIA, (1889–1973). It was one of the predecessor firms of Vonnegut, Wright & Yeager.

Pierre & Wright was responsible for many landmarks in Indianapolis and greater Indiana, and a number have been listed on the National Register of Historic Places. After the partnership disbanded in 1944, Pierre started his firm Pierre and Associates. Among the architects employed by this firm were Kenneth B. Curtiss, D. B. Hill, James O. Lewis, James M. Merrifield, J. Parke Randall, D. P. Schlegel, and Richard C. Zimmer. Wright started a new firm with Kurt Vonnegut Sr. of Vonnegut, Bohn & Mueller called Vonnegut & Wright. After Ralph Oscar Yeager of Miller & Yeager joined, the firm became Vonnegut, Wright & Yeager. Later the firm was known as Wright Porteous & Lowe.

== Works by Pierre & Wright Architects ==
- Indianapolis Public School #7
- Indianapolis Public School #78
- Williams Creek Estates: Indianapolis News Model Houses
- Oxford Gables Apartments (38th and Washington Blvd., Indianapolis)
- Tuckaway Country Club (Nashville, Indiana)
- Sears Roebuck (320 N. New Jersey, Indianapolis)
- Indiana State Library and Historical Building, Indianapolis, Indiana
- Milo Stuart Memorial Building, Arsenal Technical High School (Indianapolis, Indiana)
- Old Trails office building (301–309 W. Washington Street, Indianapolis)
