= Bernard Vonnegut =

American atmospheric scientist, chemist

- Born: August 29, 1914; Indianapolis, Indiana, U.S.
- Died: April 25, 1997 (aged 82); Albany, New York, U.S.
- Education: MIT (B.S., 1936; Ph.D., 1939)
- Known for: atmospheric chemistry, cloud seeding, atmospheric electricity and lightning
- Scientific career
- Fields: Atmospheric sciences, chemical engineering
- Workplaces: General Electric Research Laboratory, SUNY-Albany

Bernard Vonnegut (August 29, 1914 – April 25, 1997) was an American atmospheric scientist credited with discovering that silver iodide could be used effectively in cloud seeding to produce snow and rain. He was the older brother of American novelist Kurt Vonnegut, Jr.

== Early life ==
Vonnegut was born in Indianapolis, Indiana to architect Kurt Vonnegut Sr (November 24, 1884 – October 1, 1957), a partner in the firm of Vonnegut, Wright & Yeager, and homemaker Edith Sophia Lieber (d. May 14, 1944). He was named after his grandfather, architect Bernard Vonnegut Sr, co-founder of the firm of Vonnegut & Bohn. He attended Park School (now Park Tudor School) in Indianapolis and earned a B.S. in chemistry (1936) and Ph.D. in physical chemistry (1939) from Massachusetts Institute of Technology.

== Professional career ==
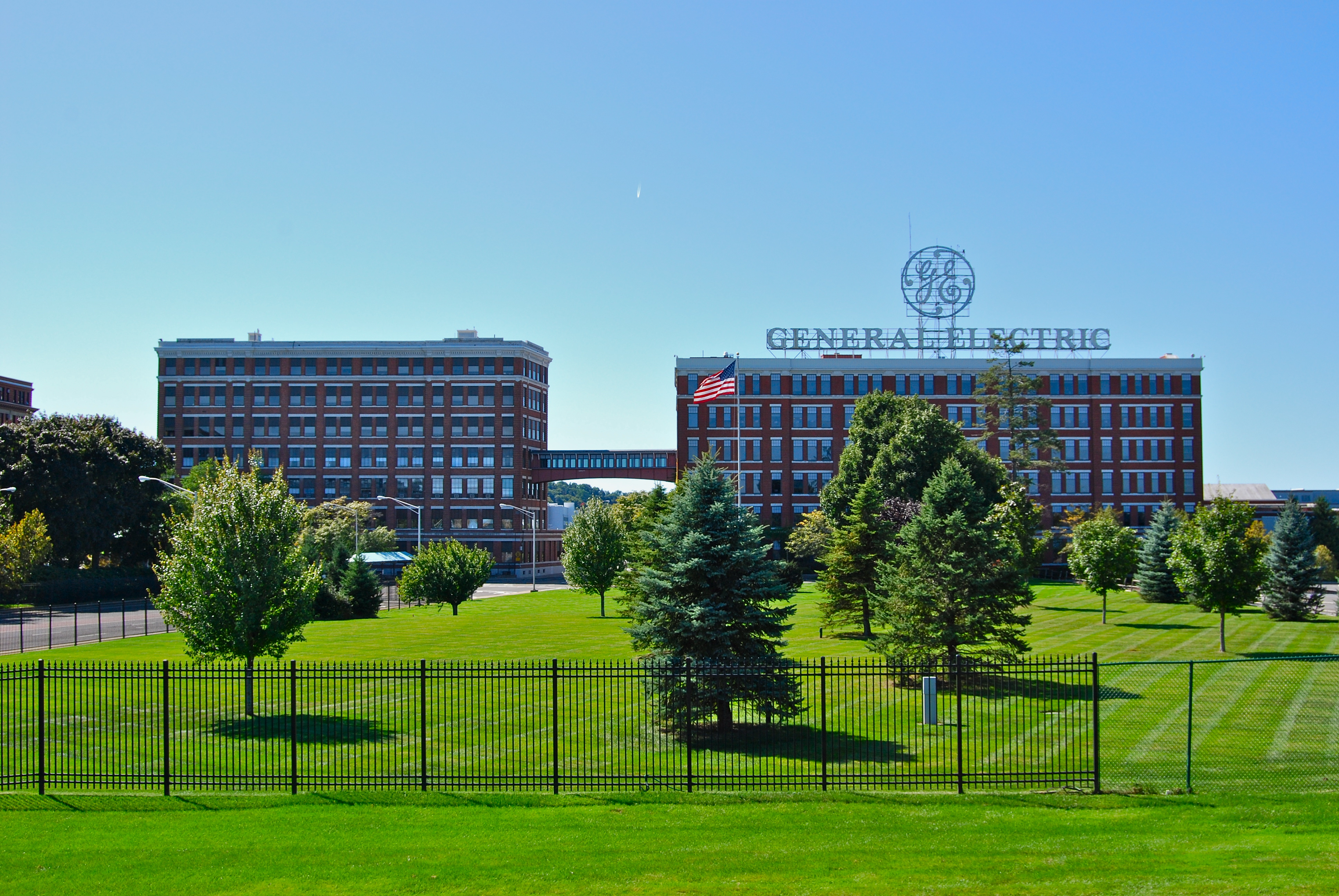
General Electric Research Laboratory

In 1945, Vonnegut started work at the General Electric Research Laboratory in Schenectady, New York. It was there, on November 14, 1946, that he discovered that silver iodide could be used as a nucleating agent to seed clouds. Seeding clouds involves inserting large quantities of a nucleating agent into clouds to facilitate the formation of ice crystals. The intent of this process is to cause the clouds to produce rain or snow. Rain- and snow-making companies still use silver iodide as a nucleating agent in seeding clouds.

Vonnegut left General Electric in 1952, taking a job at Arthur D. Little, Inc. In 1967, Vonnegut became a professor of atmospheric sciences at the University at Albany, The State University of New York. He was named a professor emeritus upon his retirement in 1985. In the course of his career Vonnegut accumulated 28 patents.

He was awarded an Ig Nobel Prize in 1997 for his paper "Chicken Plucking as Measure of Tornado Wind Speed."

== Personal life ==
He was married to Lois Bowler Vonnegut, with whom he had five sons. She died in 1972.

He died of cancer on April 25, 1997, at St. Peter's Hospital in Albany, New York.

His brother, Kurt Vonnegut, alluded to Bernard's work in some of his works, most famously in Cat's Cradle.

== See also ==
- List of Ig Nobel Prize winners
