= Ralph Oscar Yeager =

American architect

- Born: August 16, 1892; Danville, Illinois
- Died: May 6, 1960 (aged 67)
- Education: University of Pennsylvania (1915)
- Occupation: Architect
- Practice: Miller & Yeager; Vonnegut, Wright & Yeager

Ralph Oscar Yeager, AIA, (1892 – 1960) was an American architect who worked in Indiana. He was a partner in the Terre Haute, Indiana, architectural firm of Miller & Yeager and the Indianapolis, Indiana, architectural firm of Vonnegut, Wright & Yeager.

== Early life and education ==
Yeager was born August 16, 1892, in Danville, Illinois, where he graduated from high school. He then attended the School of Architecture at the University of Illinois for two years (1911–1913) and then earned a Bachelor of Science degree in architecture for the University of Pennsylvania, class of 1915.

== Early career ==
Yeager supervised construction on the U.S. Post Office Building (1915–1917) for Yeager & Sons, Contractors, served as a second lieutenant in the army during World War I (1917–1918), and was variously employed architectural offices in Chicago, Terre Haute, and Madison, Wisconsin. In 1922, he established his own practice in Chicago before returning to Terre Haute the next year (1923) to become a partner in the firm Miller & Yeager.

== Miller & Yeager ==
Miller & Yeager, located at 402 Opera House Building, Terre Haute, Indiana, was responsible for many landmarks in Indianapolis and greater Indiana, and a number have been listed on the National Register of Historic Places.

In 1946 he withdrew from the firm, which continued as Miller & Vrydagh. He then joined the surviving partners of the Indianapolis firms of Vonnegut, Bohn & Mueller and Pierre & Wright to form Vonnegut, Wright & Yeager, which had offices in both cities.

== Professional organizations ==
He was the president of the Indiana Society of Architects in 1937, 1945–1946, the Indiana chapter of the American Institute of Architects in 1945–1946, member of the Indian Society of Architects from 1923 and chapter of the AIA since 1926 (the two merged in 1946), director of the Great Lakes District of the AIA in 1946–7.

== Notable works ==
=== Works by Miller & Yeager Architects ===
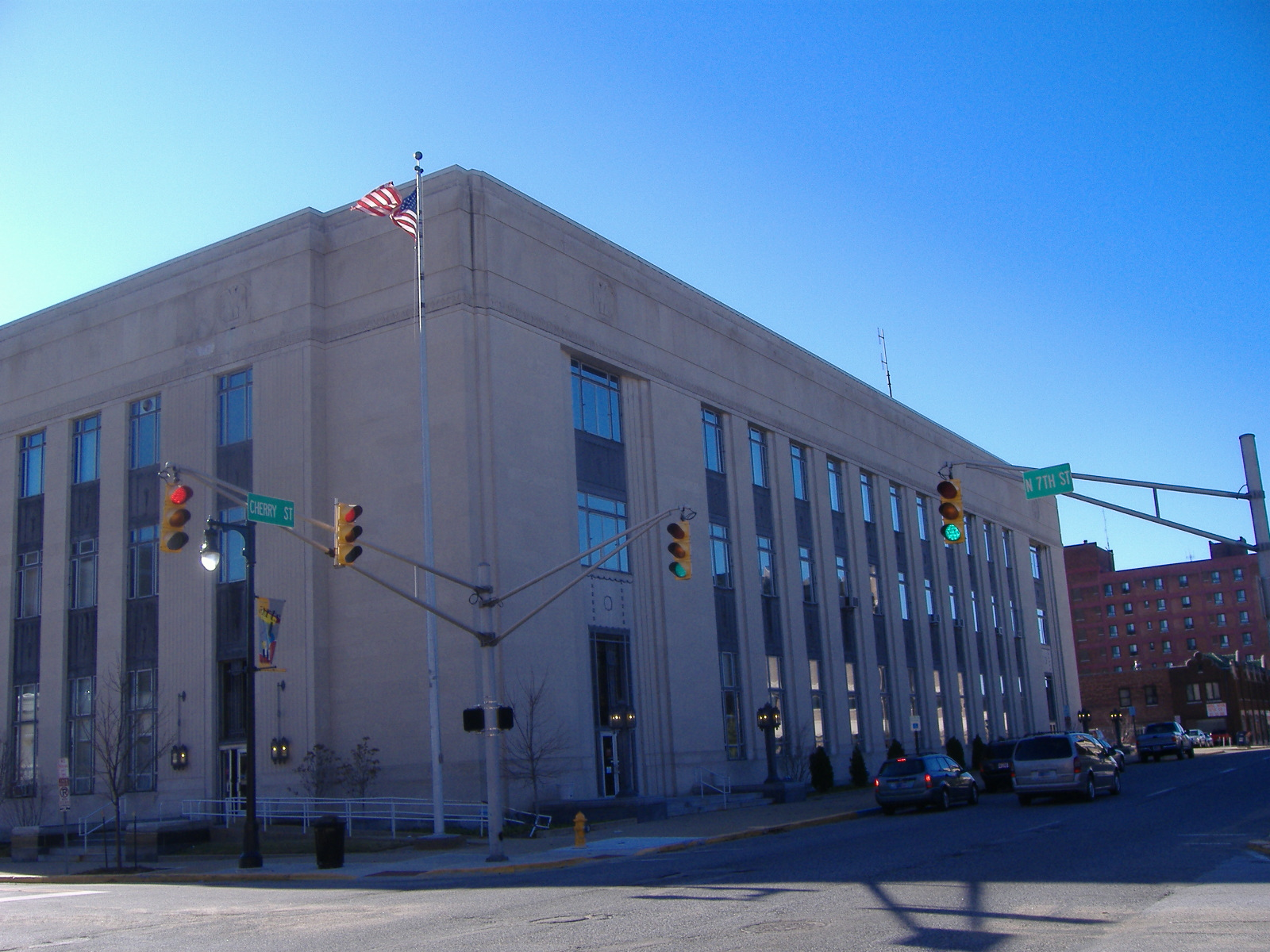
Terre Haute Post Office and Federal Building

- Coca-Cola Company Building, Terre Haute, Indiana, built for $200,000.
- Terre Haute Post Office and Federal Building, built for $450,000.
- Terre Haute City Hall, built for $250,000.
- Woodrow Wilson Junior High School (Terre Haute, Indiana) (1927), built for $750,000.
- First Church of Christ Scientist (Terre Haute, Indiana), built for $175,000
- Young Men's Christian Association (Terre Haute, Indiana), built for approximately $275,000
- Zorah Shrine (Terre Haute, Indiana), built for $300,000
- Union Hospital (Terre Haute, Indiana), built for $375,000

=== Works by Vonnegut, Wright & Yeager ===
- Stalker Hall, Indiana State University, built in 1954 for $920,000 (renovated 2004–2006)
