= Vonnegut, Wright & Yeager =

American architecture firm

Practice information
- Partners: Kurt Vonnegut Sr. George Caleb Wright; Ralph Oscar Yeager
- Founded: 1946
- Location: Indianapolis, Indiana, United States

Vonnegut, Wright & Yeager was an architectural firm active in mid-twentieth-century Indiana. The firm was organized in 1946 as a partnership between the surviving partners of three Indiana firms: Kurt Vonnegut Sr. (1884–1957) of Vonnegut, Bohn & Mueller Architects; George Caleb Wright (b. April 25, 1889) of Pierre & Wright; and Ralph Oscar Yeager (b. August 16, 1892) of Miller & Yeager. It was located at 1126 Hume Mansur Building, Indianapolis, Indiana and 402 Opera House Building, Terre Haute, Indiana.

== History ==
Vonnegut, Wright & Yeager was formed in 1946. In 1957, after the death of partner Kurt Vonnegut Sr., George Caleb Wright left the firm to become senior partner in the Indianapolis firm Wright, Porteus & Lowe.

== Works by Vonnegut, Wright & Yeager ==
- Stalker Hall, Indiana State University, built to designs by Ralph Oscar Yeager in 1954 for $920,000 (renovated 2004–2006)

== Works by Miller & Yeager ==
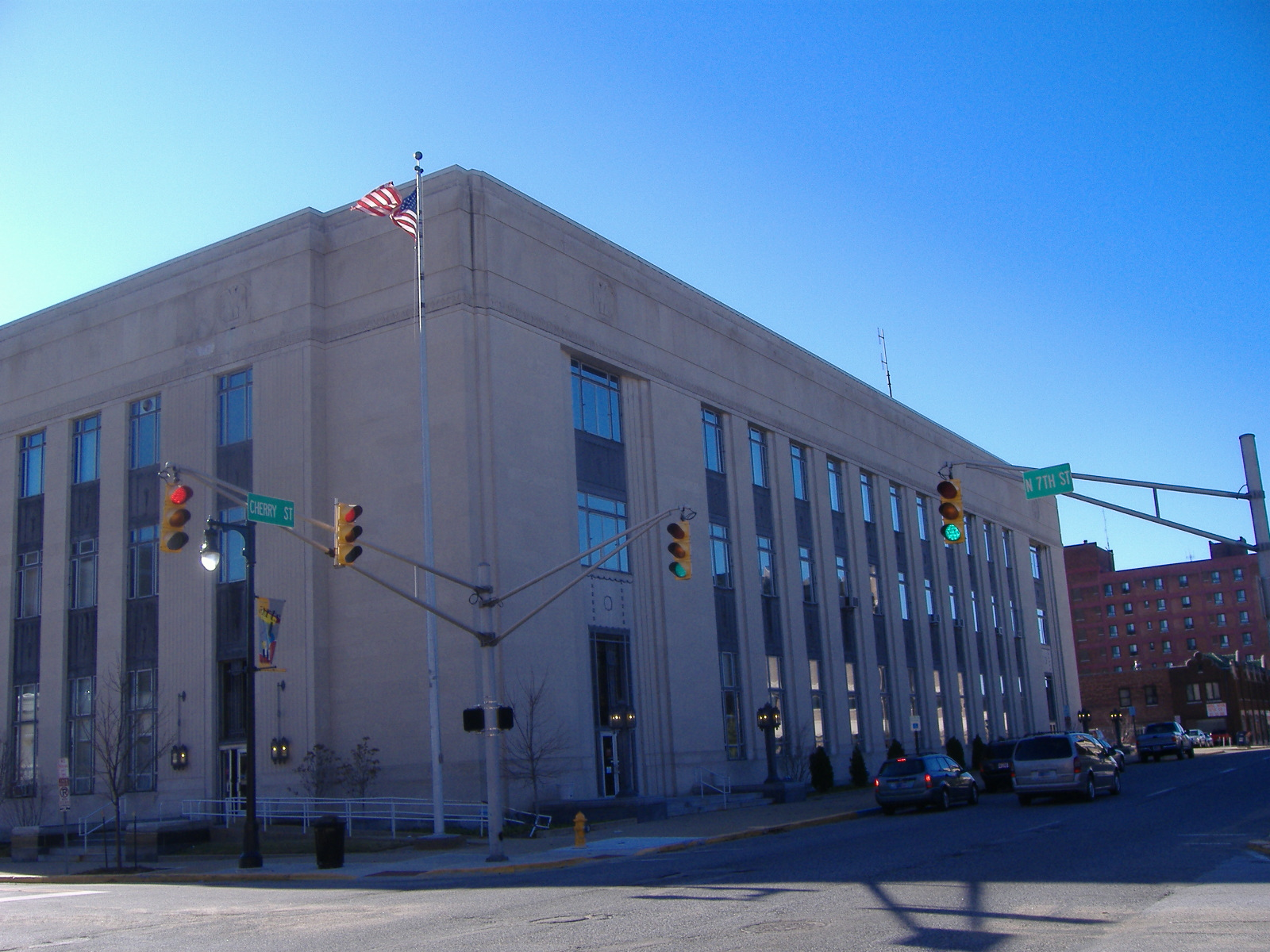
Terre Haute Post Office and Federal Building

- Coca-Cola Company Building, Terre Haute, Indiana, built for $200,000
- Terre Haute Post Office and Federal Building, built for $450,000
- Terre Haute City Hall, built for $250,000
- Woodrow Wilson Junior High School (1927), built for $750,000
- First Church of Christ Scientist (Terre Haute, Indiana), built for $175,000
- YMCA (Terre Haute, Indiana), built for approximately $275,000
- Zorah Shrine (Terre Haute, Indiana), built for $300,000
- Union Hospital (Terre Haute, Indiana), built for $375,000

== Works by Pierre & Wright Architects ==
- Indiana State Library and Historical Building, Indianapolis, Indiana
- Milo Stuart Memorial Building, Arsenal Technical High School (Indianapolis, Indiana)

== Works by Vonnegut, Bohn & Mueller ==
- Indiana Bell Telephone Building in Indianapolis, Indiana
- The first building of All Souls Unitarian Church (Indianapolis, Indiana), 1453 N. Alabama Street
- Anderson Bank building in Anderson, Indiana
- New buildings for Hooks Drug Stores prior to World War II.
- Kurt Vonnegut, Sr. Residence 4365 North Illinois Street, Indianapolis (c.1929)., Indianapolis 4th Ward Washington Township, Marion County, Indiana.
- Kurt Vonnegut, Sr. Residence (Williams Creek, Indiana) (1941)
