= William H. Block Co. =

Former department store chain in Indiana

William H. Block Company
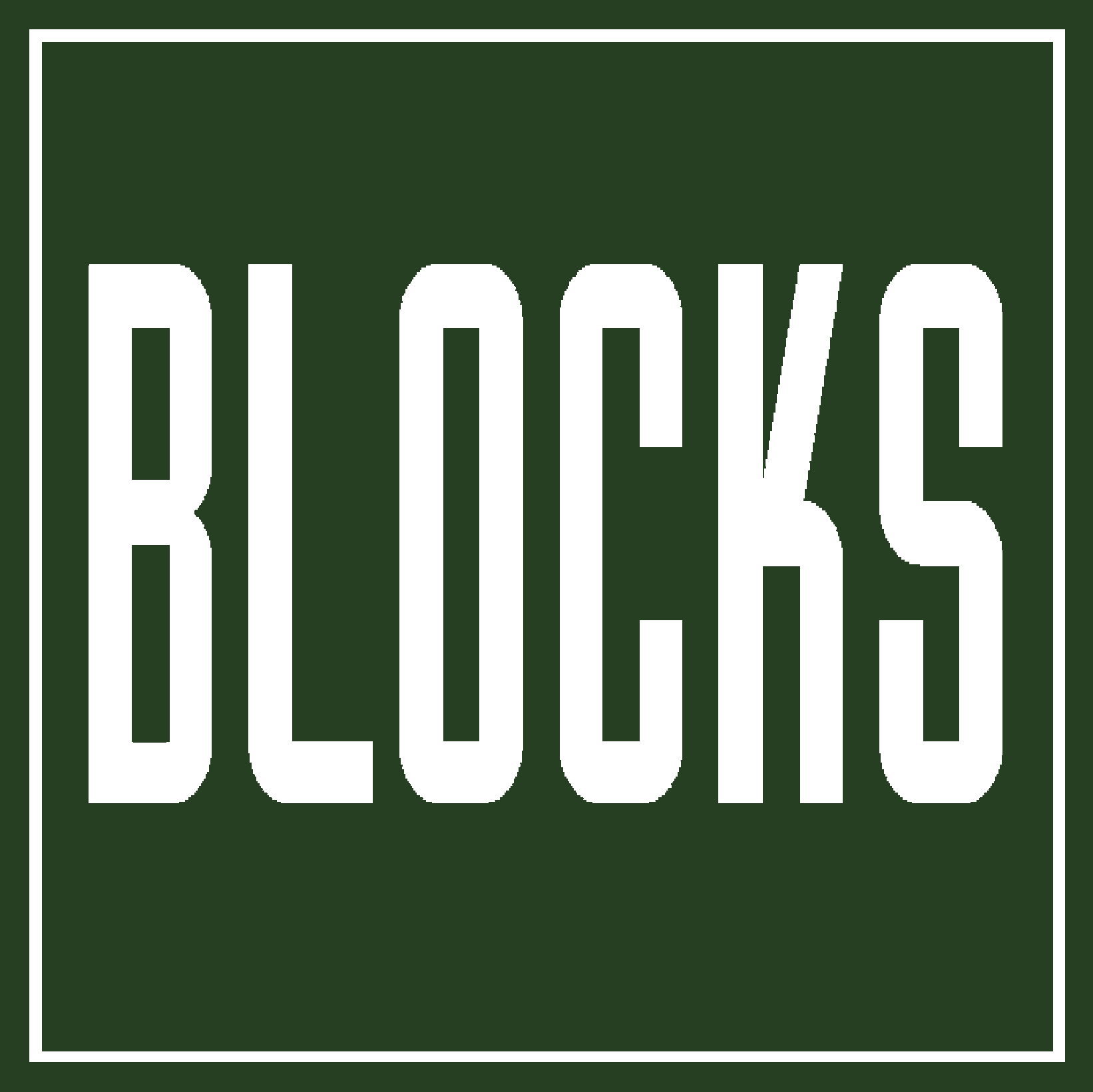
- Type: Department store
- Industry: Retail
- Founded: 1874; 152 years ago in Indianapolis
- Founder: Herman Wilhelm Bloch
- Defunct: 1987; 39 years ago
- Fate: Merged into Lazarus
- Headquarters: Indianapolis, Indiana
- Number of locations: 10 (1987)
- Area served: Central Indiana
- Products: Men's, women's and children's clothing, footwear, jewelry, beauty products, home furnishings, bedding, china and silver, furniture, toys, books
- Parent: privately owned (1874–1962); Allied Stores (1962–1987)

The William H. Block Company was a department store chain in Indianapolis and other cities in Indiana. It was founded in 1874 by Herman Wilhelm Bloch, an immigrant from Austria-Hungary who had Americanized his name to William H. Block. The main store was located at 9 East Washington Street in Indianapolis in 1896. The company also identified itself as The Wm. H. Block Co., and Block's.

== History ==
In 1910, a new eight-story store was constructed to designs by Arthur Bohn and Kurt Vonnegut Sr. of Vonnegut & Bohn on the corner of Illinois and Market streets. The new store at 50 N. Illinois Street officially opened it doors to the public on October 3, 1911.

To the People of the State of Indiana, and Especially to the Home Folks of Indianapolis, This Magnificent New Store is Dedicated. The Pride of Hoosierdom

— Dedication announcement to the opening of the new Block's store in 1911

Block was active in the business until his death in 1928, at which time the management of the company was passed to his three sons: M. S. Block, R. C. Block, and E. A. Block. The store was expanded to nearly double in size in 1934. The architect for the 1934 expansion was Kurt Vonnegut Sr. During the expansion the building's interior and exterior was redesigned in a moderne style, including furnishings, stainless steel escalators, and two-story polished black marble and stainless steel facade entrances. Architectural drawings of the entrances became the trademark logo for the store on gift boxes, print advertisements, and company stationery. A company publication identified the store as, "one of the country's most beautiful department stores". Restaurants located within the Illinois Street store included the Fountain Luncheonette, the Terrace Tea Room, the Men's Grille, and the James Whitcomb Riley Room. Block's was the second-largest retail company in Indiana, its primary competitor L. S. Ayres & Co. being the larger. Other competitors included H. P. Wasson and Company and L. Strauss & Co.

The Block's store was located on Market Street across from the Indianapolis Traction Terminal (the largest traction terminal in the United States). From 1900 to the 1930s, the Indiana interurban system brought shoppers by the thousands from smaller central Indiana towns to shop in downtown Indianapolis. The availability of cheap mass transit to downtown Indianapolis greatly increased the customer base from which the Indianapolis department stores were able to draw. Block's, being directly across the street from the traction terminal, was the first department store shoppers would visit. Block's main competitors were located at least a block away on Washington Street. Central Indiana was networked with the most extensive interurban system in the United States. Most small towns were either on the system or a station was located nearby. Interurbans from Indianapolis reached as far as Dayton, Ohio, and Fort Wayne, Indiana. The net result of the interurban system to Block's and its competitors was a customer base that rivaled that of much larger Midwestern and eastern cities, such as Detroit, Philadelphia, and Washington, D.C.

In 1954, a small branch store was opened in the Indianapolis neighborhood of Broad Ripple at 724 E. Broad Ripple Avenue and remained there until late 1960, when it was replaced by a branch of Union Federal Savings & Loan. After several name changes and bank mergers, this financial institution is still in operation at the same location as a branch of the Huntington National Bank.

== Bloomington expansion ==
In 1942, during the Second World War, Block's constructed its first branch store outside of Indianapolis in the city of Bloomington at 104 S. Indiana Avenue, just across the street from the campus of Indiana University. It was called as the Block's College Shop. It was so successful that it eventually expanded into adjacent store fronts when those properties became available. By 1955, the store's street address had become 100 S. Indiana Ave. through the last of these expansions.

After College Mall opened on the east side of Bloomington in 1965, business gradually began to move away from downtown Bloomington to the mall or nearby areas. In 1972, Block's opened its second Bloomington store in College Mall in the space currently occupied (in 2013) by Abercrombie & Fitch, Christopher & Banks, and five other stores. This location was across the hall from one of the original anchor stores, Wasson's.

Since both stores combined were small when compared to newer stores that Block's was opening at new malls being developed throughout Indiana, Block's had to wait until Goldblatt's closed its Wasson's store at College Mall in January 1981. After remodeling was completed in August 1981, Block's consolidated the two Bloomington locations into the new 60,000-square-foot (5,600 m^{2}) store. The store was converted into a Lazarus store in October 1987 and eventually closed in 2003.

After Block's had left the corner of Indiana and Kirkwood avenues, the location was occupied by the Space Port Video Arcade from 1980 until it was forced to leave in 1995 when site was purchased by the university for the construction of Carmichael Center.

== Expansion at regional malls and shopping centers ==
Starting in 1958, Block's opened stores that served as the original anchors at Glendale Shopping Center (1958), Southern Plaza (1961), Lafayette Square Mall (1969), and Washington Square Mall (1974), all in Indianapolis, and also at Tippecanoe Mall (1974) in Lafayette and Markland Mall (1974) in Kokomo.

Block's also opened a store that served as an expansion anchor at the Greenwood Park Mall in 1980 when the original Greenwood Center outdoor shopping center was converted into an indoor shopping mall.

The Glendale and Southern Plaza locations were open air shopping centers at the time they were first opened. Glendale was enclosed in 1969, but Southern Plaza was never enclosed. The other locations were originally designed as enclosed malls.

== Ohio expansion ==
As a cost saving measure, Allied Stores began to merge small department store chains into larger ones during the 1980s. In 1984, Allied Stores merged the single store division Edward Wren Co. in Springfield, Ohio, into the larger Block's store division. The original Wren's store in downtown Springfield was an economically depressed area located far outside of Block's normal advertising area. This store had a hard time trying to compete with the department stores located five miles (8.0 km) away in the Upper Valley Mall that had just opened in 1971. Lazarus quickly closed this particular store after it acquired the Block's chain in 1987 because an existing Lazarus store (formerly a Shillito-Rike's store that Lazarus had acquired the previous year) was located at the Upper Valley Mall.

== Television station ==
Block's was a major RCA dealer and in order to sell the newly invented television receivers in the late 1930s, a local TV broadcast station was needed. Block's acquired some TV broadcasting equipment with a small tower above the main store and went on the air briefly. However, America's entry into World War II suspended this small operation and the equipment was transferred to the local Naval Training Station. In 1947, Block's was granted a Federal Communications Commission (FCC) construction permit for television station WWHB, channel 3. The station's call letters had changed to WUTV by 1949, when Block's tried to sell the permit to radio station WIRE before asking for its cancellation, stating that it did not desire to enter into broadcasting.

== Merger ==
The William H. Block Co. was acquired by Allied Stores in 1962 for $7.5 million (~$59.4 million in 2024) in cash and stock. In 1987, Block's was sold to Federated Department Stores, at which time the Block's name was discontinued and many store locations were rebranded as Lazarus department stores. After having been merged into the Block's operating unit in 1987, the two Herpolsheimer's locations in the Grand Rapids, Michigan area were also re-branded as Lazarus locations. These locations closed for good in 1990.

Lazarus closed the downtown Illinois Street store in 1993. In 2003, the Illinois Street store building's upper seven floors were converted into residential apartments and the ground floor remained retail; the building complex is called The Block.

At three mall locations (Greenwood Park, Washington Square, and Lafayette Square) that had both Lazarus and Block's stores, Lazarus liquidated the stock in the former Block's stores and sold the leases for the smaller of the two stores at each location to Montgomery Ward.

In total, five Block's locations were immediately closed upon merger. The stores in downtown Springfield and at the open air Southern Plaza shopping Center were also closed. The Springfield location remained vacant for over a decade while the Southern Plaza building was demolished and replaced with a Kroger grocery store.

By 2005, none of the former Block's locations still existed to be able to be rebranded as Macy's, the final successor organization to Block's.

== See also ==
- List of department stores converted to Macy's
