= Vonnegut & Bohn =

Former architectural firm in Indianapolis, Indiana, United States

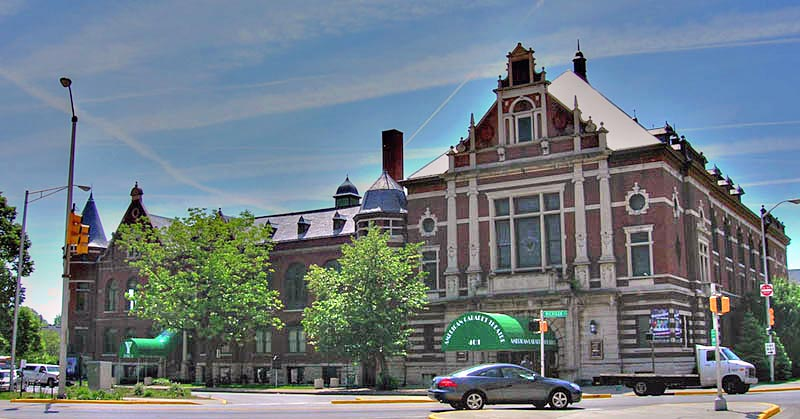
- Athenæum (Das Deutsche Haus), Indianapolis, Indiana

Practice information
- Partners: Bernard Vonnegut Sr. Arthur Bohn
- Founded: 1888
- Location: Indianapolis, Indiana

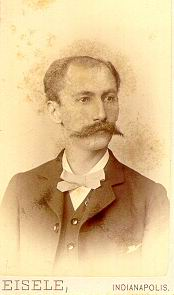
Bernard Vonnegut Sr., FAIA, photographed in 1884

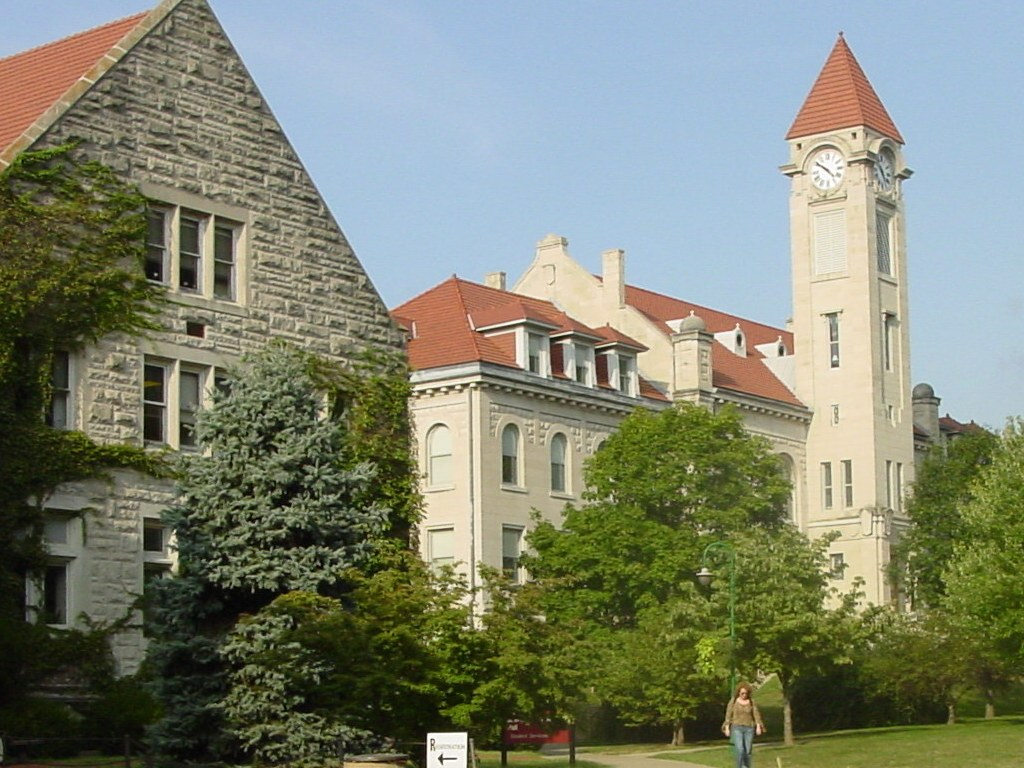
Student Building (right), Indiana University at Bloomington

Vonnegut & Bohn was an architectural firm in Indianapolis, Indiana in the United States.

Founded in 1888 by Bernard Vonnegut Sr., FAIA (1855–1908) and Arthur Bohn (b. 1861), all the partners were German Americans and were trained in both American and German architectural academies, which gave their works a distinct German influence. The firm was responsible for many public, institutional, commercial, religious and residential buildings throughout Indiana, particularly in Indianapolis.

Bernard Vonnegut died in 1908. In 1910, Vonnegut's son, Kurt Vonnegut Sr. (1884–1957), returned from studying in Germany and became a principal in the firm. Later, Mueller joined as a partner and the firm was renamed Vonnegut, Bohn & Mueller Architects. Arthur Bohn retired in the 1940s.

In 1946, Kurt Vonnegut Sr. merged the firm with George Caleb Wright (b. April 25, 1889) of Pierre & Wright and Ralph Oscar Yeager (b. August 16, 1892) of Miller & Yeager (of Terre Haute, Indiana) forming Vonnegut, Wright & Yeager, which was located at 1126 Hume Mansur Building, Indianapolis, Indiana and 402 Opera House Building, Terre Haute, Indiana.

Kurt Vonnegut Sr. was the father of author Kurt Vonnegut Jr., and is referred to, with the rest of the author's family, in many of his books.

== Works by Vonnegut, Bohn & Mueller Architects ==
- The Athenæum (Das Deutsche Haus), 401 E. Michigan Street, Indianapolis, Indiana, German Renaissance Revival style, listed on the National Register of Historic Places in 1973; (Design by Bernard Vonnegut and Arthur Bohn)
- William H. Block Company Building, Indianapolis, Indiana, after 1910; (Design by Bernard Vonnegut and Arthur Bohn)
- Herron Art Institute, Indianapolis, Indiana; (Design by Bernard Vonnegut)
- L. S. Ayres Building, Indianapolis, Indiana, 1905; (Design by Bernard Vonnegut)
- The Students Building, Indiana University at Bloomington; (Design by Bernard Vonnegut)
- Delaware Street Temple, Indianapolis, Indiana; (Design by Bernard Vonnegut)
- Shortridge High School, Indianapolis, Indiana; (Design by Bernard Vonnegut)
- Federal Building, Vincennes, Indiana; (Design by Bernard Vonnegut)
- Indiana Bell Building, Evansville, Indiana, NRHP listed
- Indiana Bell Telephone Building, Indianapolis, Indiana; (Design by Kurt Vonnegut Sr.)
- All Souls Unitarian Church, 1453 N. Alabama Street, Indianapolis, Indiana, first building; (Design by Kurt Vonnegut)
- Anderson Bank Building, Anderson, Indiana; (Design by Kurt Vonnegut )
- Hook's Drug Stores, buildings prior to World War II; (Design by Kurt Vonnegut )
- Kurt Vonnegut Sr. Residence, Indianapolis 4th Ward Washington Township, Marion County, Indiana, c. 1929; (Design by Kurt Vonnegut Sr.)
- Kurt Vonnegut Sr. Residence, William's Creek, Indiana, 1941; (Design by Kurt Vonnegut)
- Chemico Laboratories, Indianapolis, Indiana, 1944; (Designed by Kurt Vonnegut Sr. and George Caleb Wright)
- Evansville Telephone Building, Sycamore Street, Evansville, Indiana, 1922; (Designed by Kurt Vonnegut, Arthur Bohn, and O.N. Mueller)
- Merchant's Building, Capitol Avenue and Georgia Street, Indianapolis, Indiana, 1914; (Designed by Kurt Vonnegut and Arthur Bohn)
- Office building for United Brotherhood of Carpenters and Joiners of America, Indianapolis, Indiana, 1908; (Designed by Bernard Vonnegut and Arthur Bohn)
- Vonnegut Hardware Company, 120 East Washington Street, Indianapolis, Indiana, 1948; (Designed by Kurt Vonnegut, George Caleb Wright, and Ralph Oscar Yeager)
- Meridian Service Company, Automobile Service Plant, 2421 North Meridian Street, Indianapolis, Indiana, 1926; (Designed by Kurt Vonnegut, Arthur Bohn, and O.N. Mueller)
