= Stalker Hall =

Hall on the campus of Indiana State University

- Interactive map of the Stalker Hall area

General information
- Type: Classroom
- Architectural style: Art Deco
- Location: Chestnut Street; on the Quadrangle of Indiana State University
- Coordinates: 39.470167°N 87.408858°W
- Named for: Francis M. Stalker
- Completed: 1954

Design and construction
- Architect: Ralph Oscar Yeager of Vonnegut, Wright & Yeager

Website
- Stalker Hall at indstate.edu

Stalker Hall is the current home of the College of Arts and Sciences at Indiana State University. Originally named the Education & Social Studies Building upon completion in 1954, it was renamed Stalker Hall in 1966 in honor of Francis Marion Stalker, a longtime member of the faculty from 1892 to 1929.

From 2004 to 2005, it underwent a $5.5 million renovation which addressed structural, technological and cosmetic deficiencies. It is now fully compliant with the Americans with Disabilities Act standards.

- Architect: Ralph O. Yeager
- Contractor: J.L. Simmons Co., Inc. and Nehf Hardware & Electric Co., Terre Haute
- Initial Cost: ~$920,000
- Renovated: 2004–2006 -- Classrooms now contain the latest technology, Additional elevators were added, Energy-efficient windows and doors were installed, A new facade was added to the southern entrance of building, "tying" it to the Quadrangle. This was possible due to the 1998 razing of the original Science Building.
- Notes: This is the second Indiana State University building to bear the name Stalker Hall, the initial building was the 'Laboratory School' constructed in 1905 and razed in 1953.
