= Indiana Bell Building =

- U.S. National Register of Historic Places
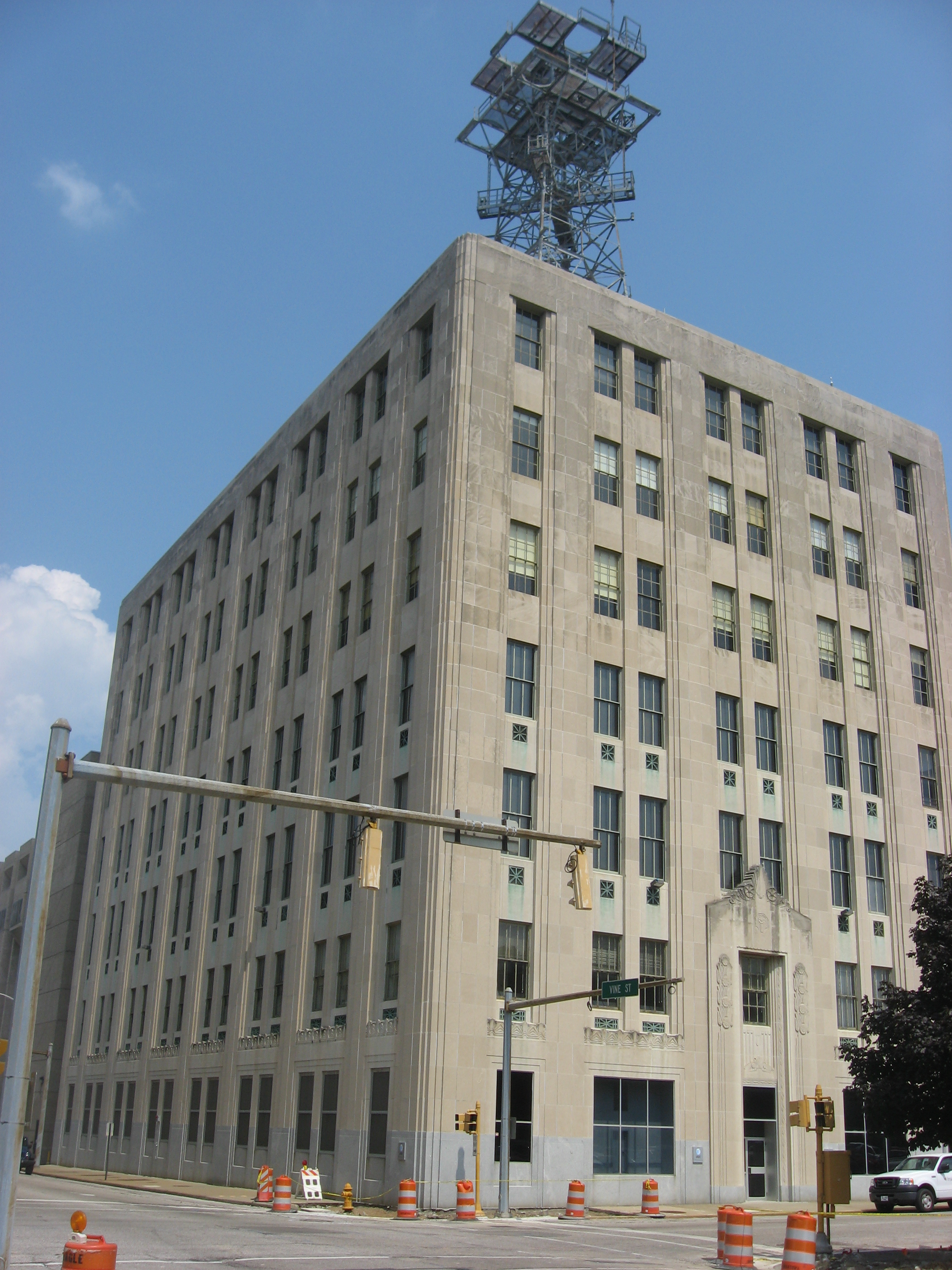
- Indiana Bell Building, July 2011

- Location within Indiana Location within the United States
- Location: 129-133 NW 5th St., Evansville, Indiana
- Coordinates: 37°58′25″N 87°34′16″W
- Area: less than one acre
- Built: 1929
- Architect: Vonnegut, Bohn, & Mueller
- Architectural style: Art Deco
- MPS: Downtown Evansville MRA
- NRHP reference No.: 82000103
- Added to NRHP: July 1, 1982

Indiana Bell Building is a historic commercial building located in downtown Evansville, Indiana. It was designed by the architectural firm Vonnegut, Bohn, & Mueller and built in 1929 for Indiana Bell. It is a seven-story, Art Deco style limestone clad building.

It was listed on the National Register of Historic Places in 1982.

== See also ==
- AT&T Building (Indianapolis) was called Indiana Bell Building.
