= Athenæum (Das Deutsche Haus) =

Building in Indianapolis, Indiana, US

- U.S. National Register of Historic Places
- U.S. National Historic Landmark
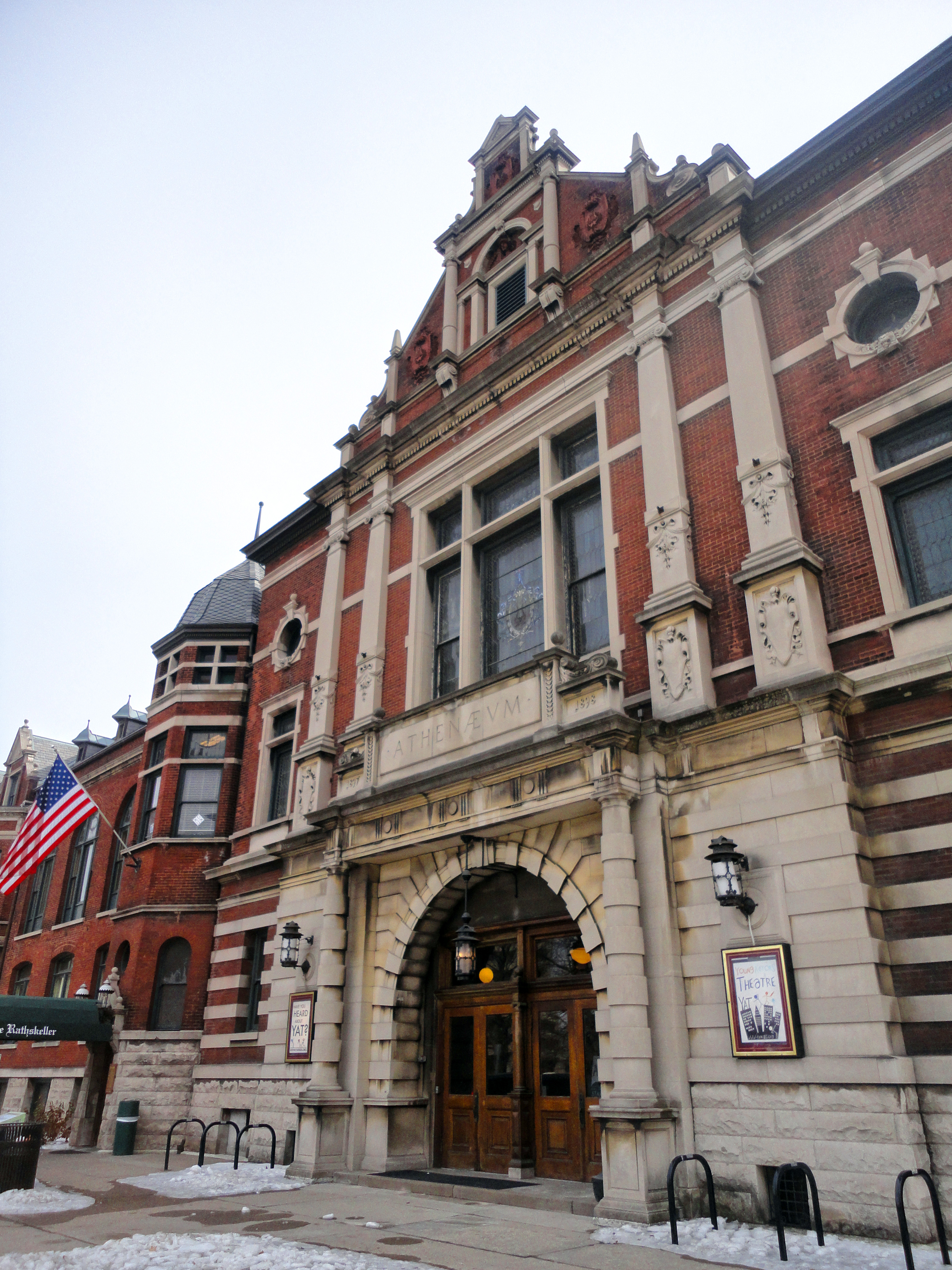
- The Athenæum in 2011.

- Location within Indiana Location within the United States
- Location: 401 E. Michigan St., Indianapolis, Indiana, U.S.
- Coordinates: 39°46′24″N 86°9′1″W
- Area: 1 acre (0.40 ha)
- Built: 1893
- Architects: Vonnegut & Bohn; Multiple
- Architectural style: Renaissance Revival
- NRHP reference No.: 73000032

Significant dates
- Added to NRHP: February 21, 1973
- Designated NHL: October 31, 2016

The Athenæum, originally named Das Deutsche Haus (German: "The German House"), is the most ornate and best-preserved building affiliated with the German American community of Indianapolis, Indiana, U.S. Once used as a German American Turnverein and clubhouse, it currently houses many groups, organizations, and businesses. The Athenæum is located across Massachusetts Avenue from the Old National Centre. It was placed on the National Register of Historic Places on February 21, 1973. On October 31, 2016, it was named the 41st National Historic Landmark in Indiana.

== History ==
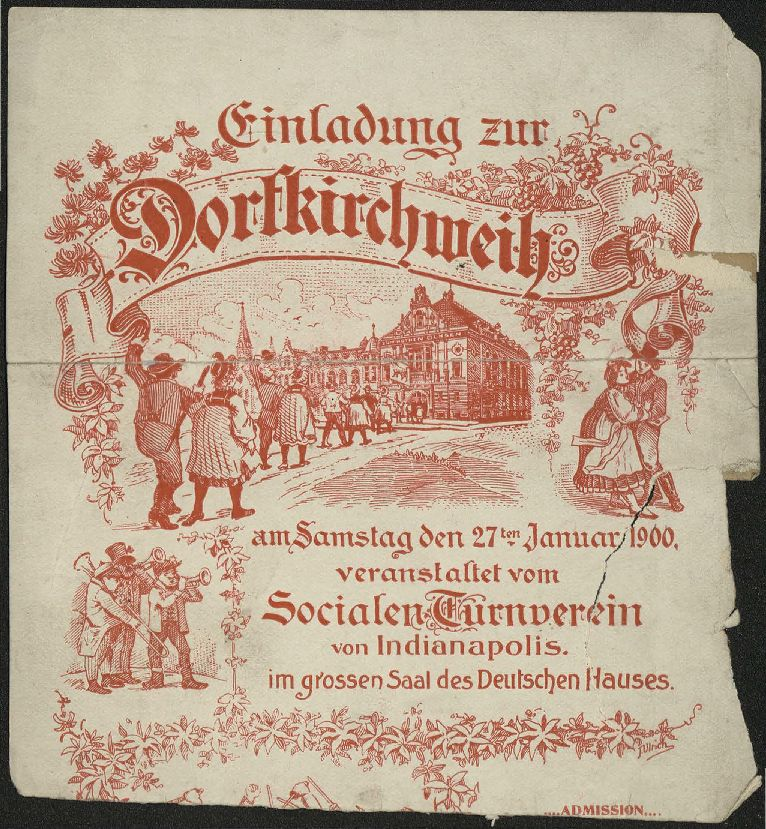
German-language advertisement for a German fair at Das Deutsche Haus, in January 1900.

In the 19th century, many German immigrants made their home in Indiana. A majority of these immigrants, called Forty-Eighters, relocated to the United States following the failed Revolutions of 1848 in the German states. These immigrants quickly formed musical, political, and social clubs after the German idea of club life, including the Männerchor, Turnverein, and Liederkranz. Many of these immigrants believed in the philosophy of Friedrich Ludwig Jahn. In 1892, to preserve their German heritage, the German clubs formed the Sozialer Turnverein Aktiengesellschaft (German: Social Gymnastics Association Inc.), an association to finance the building of a clubhouse. The clubhouse was built as a house of culture for the mind and body. All the German clubs would be united under a single roof.

For a cost of $32,000, two lots were purchased at the corner of Michigan and New Jersey streets. A German neighborhood called Lockerbie Square, also known as Germantown, surrounded the clubhouse. Construction of the East Wing began in May 1893, and was finished in 1894. The West Wing construction started in 1897 and was completed in 1898. German American architects Bernard Vonnegut Sr. (grandfather of Indianapolis novelist Kurt Vonnegut) and Arthur Bohn designed both wings. It was called Das Deutsche Haus and hosted many organizations, including the German-American Veterans Society, the German-American School Society, the Socialer Turnverein Women's Club, the German Ladies' Aid Society, and the Turner Building and Savings Association. There were 500 members by 1896.

In 1897, the Musikverein (Music Society) was founded at Das Deutsche Haus; it included a 60-piece orchestra, a male choir, and a mixed choir. The Athenaeum Orchestra is now the oldest orchestra in Indianapolis.

In 1907, Das Deutsche Haus agreed to house the Normal College of the American Gymnastic Union in its east wing. The normal school trained physical education teachers for schools across the country. Indiana University incorporated the school in 1941 as a department of the School of Health, Physical Education, and Recreation. It claims to be the oldest school of physical education in the United States.

With the anti-German sentiments of World War I, the clubhouse renamed itself the Athenæum. Today, the Athenaeum is operated by the nonprofit Athenaeum Foundation.

== Architecture ==
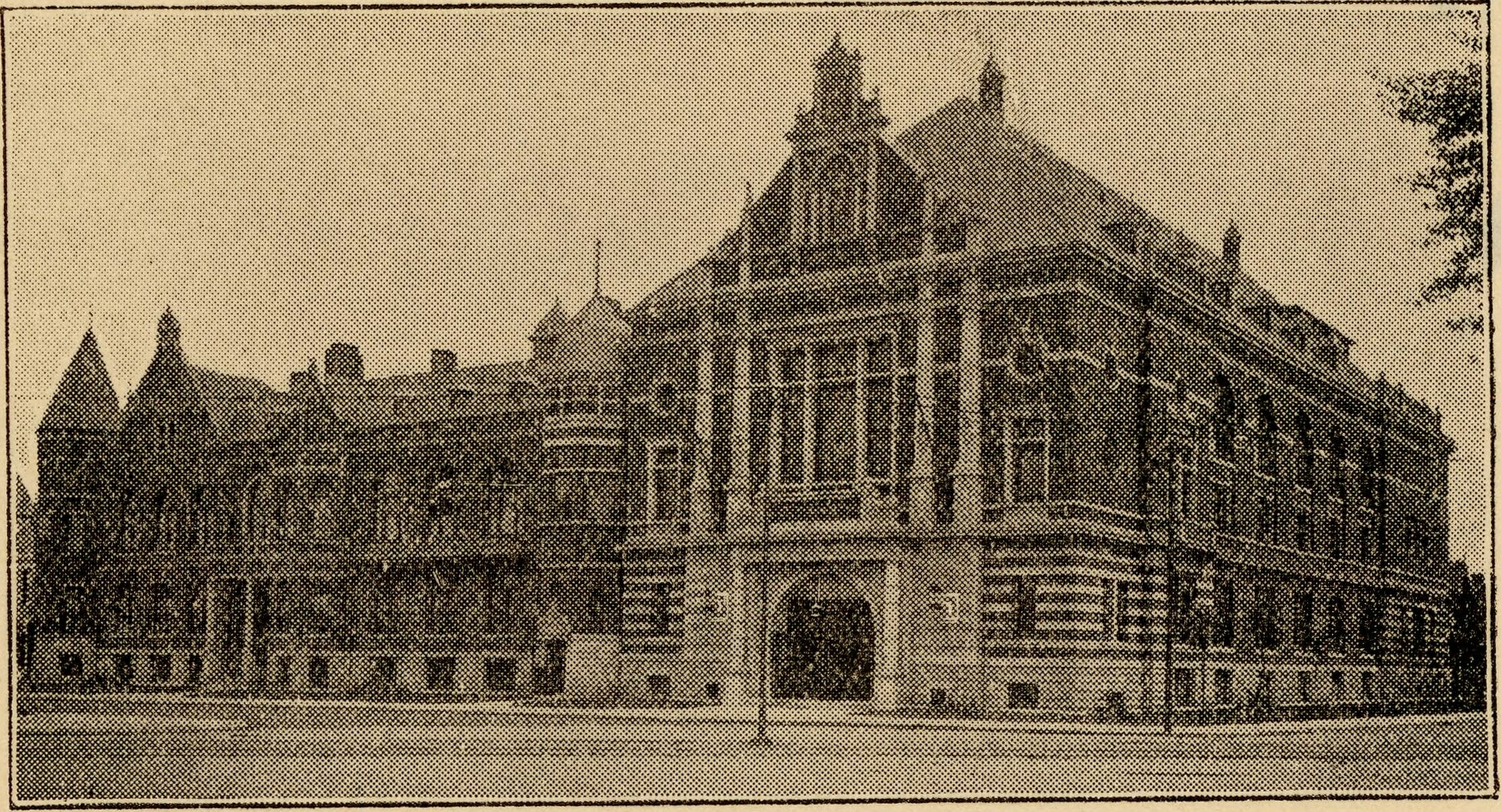
Das Deutsche Haus, as pictured in a photo from 1904 or earlier.

The front part of the building is the East Wing. It is built in the German Renaissance Revival style, which incorporates German architecture with Renaissance elements. The wing has a gable roof. There is a three storied brick tower with a conical slate roof. The entrance is flanked by two Roman Doric columns, and is arched with a semicircle of limestone. The upper windows are arched and the gymnasium has bullseye-shaped windows.

The West Wing is also done in the German Renaissance Revival style. It has a steep pitched hip roof. This wing also has a three storied brick tower but it has a curved mansard roof and spire. The wing has various window styles and some windows have stained glass. Roman Doric columns are placed beside the arched entrance. At each end of the main roof there are copper covered cupolas. The wing has a baroque pediment above its cornice. The faces of the stone voussoirs of the arches are projected outward. The facade is decorated with terra cotta grotesques. A figure of Athena, the building's namesake, is placed in the top arch.

== Facilities ==
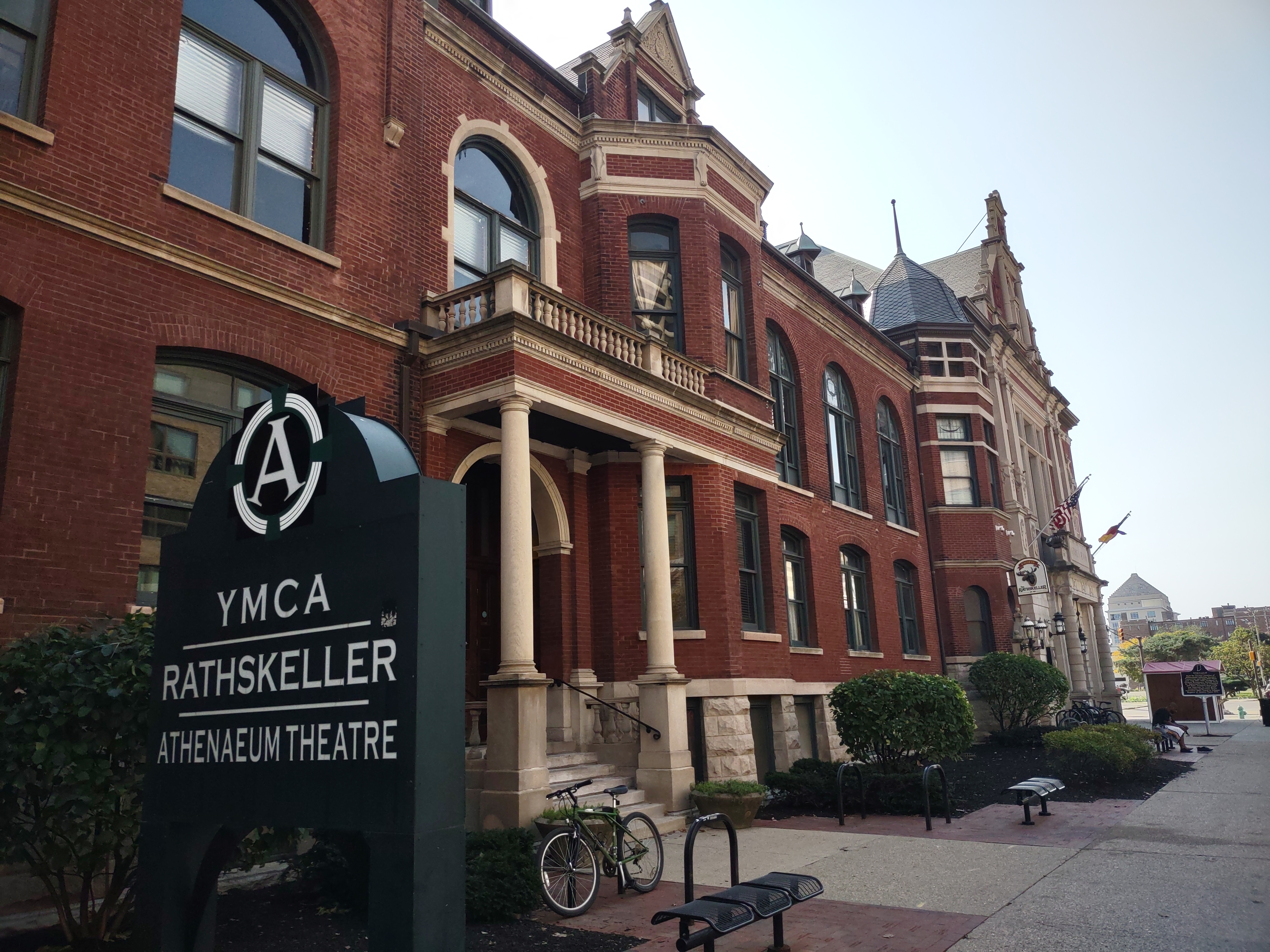
The Rathskeller

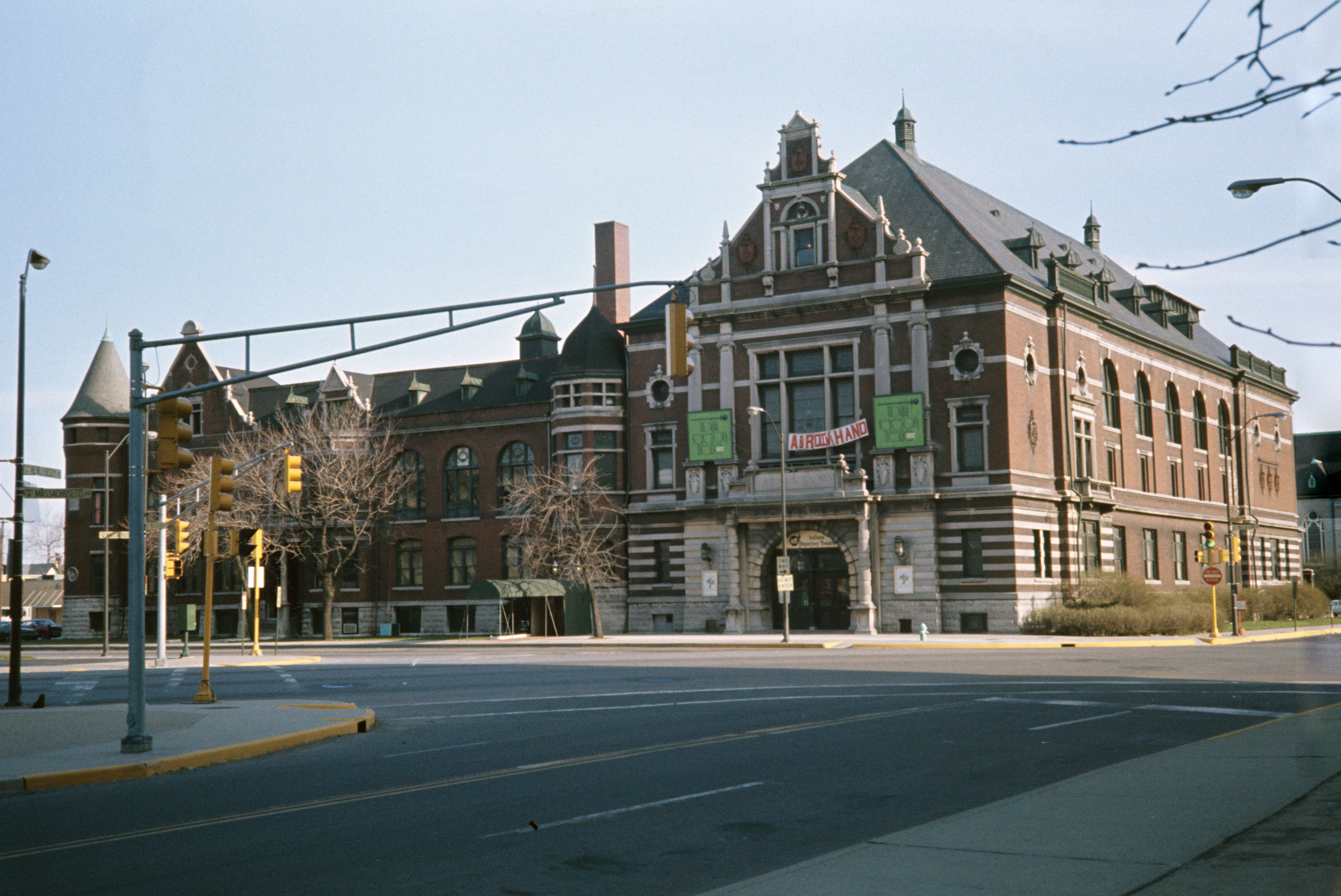
Athenaeum in 1975 on 401-415 East Michigan Street.

The Athenæum Foundation nonprofit organization is dedicated to preserving the historical Athenæum and serving the Indianapolis community. The foundation sponsors events and programs throughout the year. Free tours of the Athenæum are offered twice a month between March and December. Group tours can also be scheduled.

In the Athenaeum is the Rathskeller Restaurant, which is the oldest restaurant in the city.

- Athenæum Damenverein
- Athenæum Docent Club
- Athenæum Pops Orchestra
- Athenæum Turners
- Basile Theatre at the Historic Athenaeum
- Coat Check Coffee
- Indiana German Heritage Society
- Indianapolis German Language Institute
- Indianapolis Männerchor Inc.
- Indy Metro Church
- Max Kade German-American Center
- Rathskeller Restaurant
- YMCA
- Young Actors Theatre

== Events ==
In October 2009, the Athenaeum held its first annual GermanFest. The event, held outside on New Jersey Street, featured the Männerchor, the Saenger Chor, Meisterwinds, dachshund races, dancing, children's activities, and a visit from Mayor Greg Ballard.

== See also ==
- List of attractions and events in Indianapolis
- List of National Historic Landmarks in Indiana
- National Register of Historic Places listings in Center Township, Marion County, Indiana
