= Fletcher Trust Building =

High-rise hotel in Indianapolis, Indiana, US

- Hilton Garden Inn Indianapolis Downtown
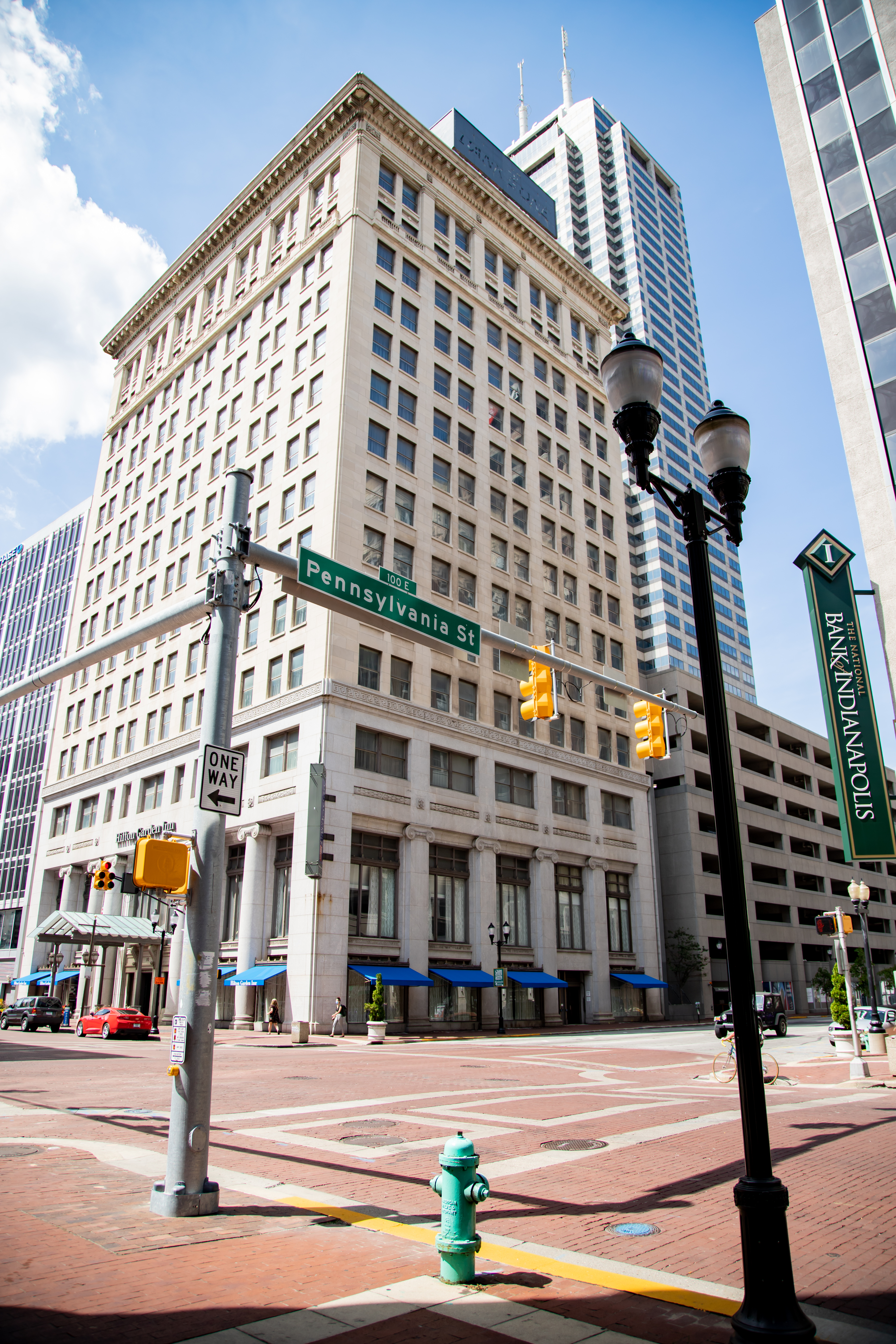
- Interactive map of the Fletcher Trust Building area

General information
- Type: Hotel
- Location: 108 North Pennsylvania Street, Indianapolis, Indiana, United States
- Coordinates: 39°46′07.25″N 86°09′23.5″W
- Completed: 1915
- Opening: 1915
- Owner: Hilton Garden Inn

Height
- Roof: 218 ft (66 m)

Technical details
- Floor count: 16

Design and construction
- Architects: Holabird & Roche, Arthur Bohn

Fletcher Trust Building, officially known as the Hilton Garden Inn Indianapolis Downtown, is a hotel high-rise in Indianapolis, Indiana. The building rises 16 floors and 218 feet (66 m) in height, and is currently the 22nd-tallest building in the city. The structure was completed in 1915. The Fletcher Trust Building currently is home to an Indianapolis branch of Hilton Garden Inn.

Architect Electus D. Litchfield originally won the design competition for the building, but was later replaced by local architect Arthur Bohn of Vonnegut & Bohn, who supervised design and construction work for the Chicago firm Holabird & Roche. The building served as an office tower from its 1916 completion until 1992, when the structure was vacated by its last commercial tenant, Bank One. The Fletcher Trust Building then underwent a renovation into a hotel in 1996 and reopened as the Ramada Waterbury Indianapolis Hotel in late 1996. The structure was renovated again in 2003 and subsequently reopened as a 188-room Hilton Garden Inn hotel.

According to the Indianapolis Business Journal, the Hilton Garden Inn Indianapolis Downtown has 100 full-time employees and was last renovated in 2018. As of 2025, the hotel has an on-site restaurant called The Social American Tavern. The restaurant serves an elevated spin on tavern food with local twists.

== See also ==
- List of tallest buildings in Indianapolis
