= George Caleb Wright =

- Born: April 25, 1889; Libertyville, Illinois
- Died: February 27, 1973 (aged 83)
- Education: University of Illinois (1912)
- Occupation: Architect
- Practice: Pierre & Wright; Vonnegut, Wright & Yeager; Wright, Porteous & Lowe
- Buildings: Indiana State Library and Historical Building

George Caleb Wright, AIA, (April 25, 1889 – February 27, 1973) was an American architect from Indiana. He was a partner in the Indianapolis, Indiana, architectural firms of Pierre & Wright, Vonnegut, Wright & Yeager (formed 1946), and Wright, Porteous & Lowe, and was later chief building inspector for the City of Indianapolis.

== Early life and education ==
Wright was born April 25, 1889, in Libertyville, Illinois, where he attended his education until the high school level. He then attended the University of Illinois from 1908 to 1912, earning a degree in architecture and engineering.

== Early career ==
He worked for the International Harvester Company from 1912 to 1915, George C. Nimmons & Co. from 1915 to 1923, and Herbert Foltz from 1923 to 1925 until he formed Pierre & Wright. In addition, he was a construction supervisor during World War I for the army. He relocated to Indianapolis from Chicago in 1923.

== Pierre & Wright (1925–1944) ==
Pierre & Wright, formed 1925, was responsible for many landmarks in Indianapolis and greater Indiana, and a number have been listed on the National Register of Historic Places. The Pierre & Wright Architectural Records Collection is located at Ball State University Libraries' Drawings + Documents Archive, Muncie, Ind.

== Vonnegut, Wright & Yeager ==
In 1946, Wright formed a new firm with Kurt Vonnegut Sr. called Vonnegut & Wright. After Yeager joined the firm it became Vonnegut, Wright and Yeager, then Wright, Porteous & Lowe, and then Wright, Porteous & Lowe/Bonar.

== Wright, Porteous & Lowe ==
Following Kurt Vonnegut Sr.'s death in 1957, he left Vonnegut, Wright & Yeager and was senior partner in the firm Wright, Porteous & Lowe. His son, William Caleb Wright, was also a partner in that firm. From 1963 to 1969, he was chief building inspector for the City of Indianapolis.

== Professional organizations ==
He was a registered architect in Indiana, Kentucky, and Illinois and president of the Indiana Society of Architects and the Indiana Chapter of the AIA. In addition, he was a member of the board of the Indianapolis Construction League, Vice-Chairman of the Policy Committee, Indiana Construction Industry, member of the Mayor's Special Committee on Housing, etc.

== Works by Pierre & Wright Architects ==
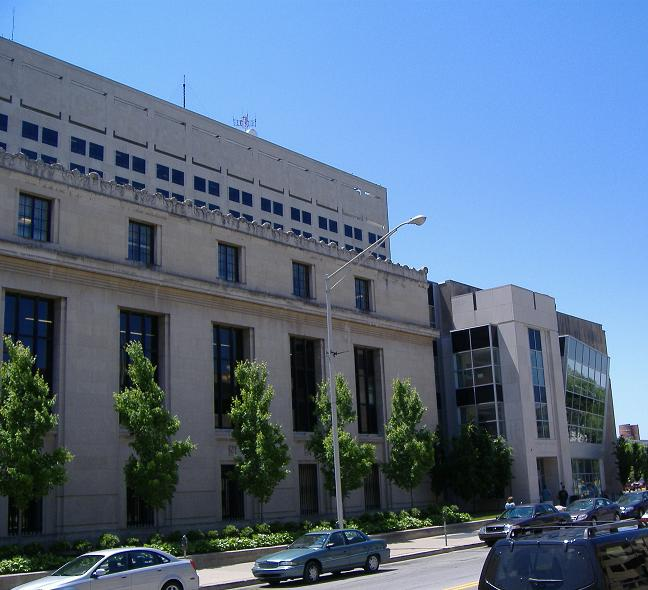
Indiana State Library

- Indiana State Library and Historical Building, Indianapolis, Indiana
- Milo Stuart Memorial Building, Arsenal Technical High School (Indianapolis, Indiana)
