= Hook's Drug Stores =

American drug store chain

- Founded: 1900
- Defunct: 1994
- Fate: Acquired by Revco
- Successor: CVS, following acquisition of Revco
- Headquarters: Indianapolis, Indiana, U.S.
- Products: Pharmacy, cosmetics, health and beauty aids, general merchandise, snacks

Hook's Drug Stores was an Indianapolis, Indiana-based drug store chain that was founded in 1900 by John A. Hook. The chain flourished throughout central Indiana for most of the 20th century.

Hook's did business under its own banner, the SupeRX Drug Stores banner outside its core market, and the Brooks Pharmacy banner after acquiring the New England pharmacy chain. The entire company was eventually purchased by fellow Midwestern drugstore chain Revco.

Most former Hook's locations that are still open operate as CVS, which bought out Revco in the late 1990s and rebranded their stores as CVS. The Brooks Pharmacy stores were divested by Revco after the purchase; most of them operate as Rite Aid stores.

== History ==
=== Hook's Drug ===
A typical Hook's store in New Castle, Indiana, in 1974

In October 1900, pharmacist John A. Hook opened the first Hook's Drug Store at the corner of South East and Prospect Streets in what is now the Bates-Hendricks neighborhood, and at the time populated mainly by residents of German descent. A second location opened in 1907 at the corner of New Jersey and East Washington Streets and Hook hired Edward F. Roesch to run the store. By 1912, the chain had expanded to twelve stores. Many of Hook's interwar drug stores were designed by Kurt Vonnegut Sr. of Vonnegut & Bohn.

Roesch became president of the company in 1943 upon Hook's death. In 1956, following Roesch's death in a traffic accident, John Hook's son, August F. "Bud" Hook, assumed became president. He was later named chairman in 1972. Roesch's son, Edward J.F. Roesch, became vice president and a long-running member of the company's board of directors. The original Hook's location was demolished in 1941. In 1963, a new company headquarters was built in Indianapolis. Between 1946 and 1972, all but two of the chain's stores were replaced with 150 modernized locations. By 1978, the chain had 250 stores.

Starting in 1977, the company established a chain of Convalescent Aid Centers. By 1994, there were 30 locations. By 1982, Hook's had 267 stores in Illinois, Indiana, and Ohio. It ranked 14th nationally by number of sales units and 19th in overall sales volume.

=== Hook's-SupeRx ===
In 1985, Rite Aid attempted a takeover of Hook's. Looking to avoid the deal, Hook's sold out to Kroger instead. Kroger had been in the drugstore business for 25 years, having purchased a small chain in New Jersey in 1960. By the following year, Kroger launched its own SupeRx Drugs chain. By 1969, the company operated 361 stores in 23 states. The purchase of Hook's was expected to enhance its drug chain operations.

However, just one year after the acquisition, Kroger initiated a restructuring plan that ultimately saw it sell off its division of 540 Superx and 330 Hook's drug stores. In December 1986, Kroger sold 662 Hook and SupeRx stores to an investment group as part of a leveraged buyout. That same month, five stores were sold to Medicare-Glaser in the St. Louis area. Another 115 Superx stores in Florida and Georgia were sold to Rite Aid. By February 1987, Kroger divested its last drug stores by selling 48 SupeRx stores in Arizona, Alabama, and Georgia to the chain's former president. Hook's became a division of the privately held Hook's-SupeRx. Operations moved from Indianapolis to Cincinnati.

Hook's-SupeRx acquired the New England–based Brooks Pharmacy chain in 1988. Afterwards, the company traded under three different names: Hook's Drug and SupeRx in the Midwest, and Brooks Pharmacy in New England. In 1992, Hook-SupeRx held its own IPO and severed ties with its Kroger-owned supplier. By this time, it operated 400 drugstores in Indiana, Illinois, Ohio, Michigan, and Kentucky.

=== Sale to Revco ===
Hook's-SupeRx was acquired by Revco for $600 million in 1994. The purchase of 1,150 stores doubled Revco's size, pushed the company into 13 additional states, and made it the second-largest drug chain in the country. Stores in Indiana continued to operate under the Hook's name. Jean Coutu Group acquired 221 Brooks Pharmacy locations operating in New England. Hook's-SuperRx stores in Michigan and the Chicago area were also sold off. The rest became Revco stores. Revco moved Hook's-SuperRx headquarters from Cincinnati to Twinsburg.

Three years later, Revco was subsequently acquired by CVS in 1997. Many former Hook's locations are now CVS Pharmacies, though the Hook's-SuperRx name remained in use internally.

== Legacy ==
=== Hook's Historical Drugstore Museum ===
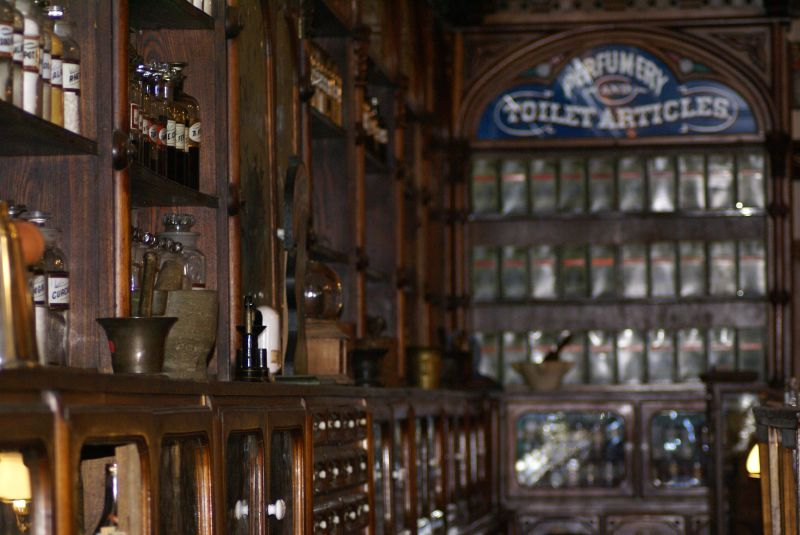
Museum interior in 2007

In August 1966, the company opened a historical drugstore museum to commemorate the 150th anniversary of Indiana's admission into the union. The restored 19th-century Hook's drug store is in the Indiana State Fairgrounds and is a popular attraction at the annual Indiana State Fair. The store was originally built in 1849 and has been restored with authentic cabinets from the 19th century and Hook's first store.

The exhibit was initially only meant to last for three months, but later became a permanent operation, and soda fountain service was added in 1971. The museum was operated by Hook's until the company's sale to Revco in 1994. It was then donated to a not-for-profit organization.

=== Hook's Oxygen and Medical Equipment ===
After Hook's was sold to Revco, the Oxygen and Medical Equipment stores continued under the Hook's name in many of the same locations as before. It later became a subsidiary of Rotech Medical Corporation.

=== Hook's Apothecary ===
In 1999, the great-grandchildren of John A. Hook opened Hook's Apothecary in Evansville, Indiana. The store specializes in compounding prescriptions. It has no corporate ties to CVS.
