= Anderson Bank Building =

- U.S. National Register of Historic Places
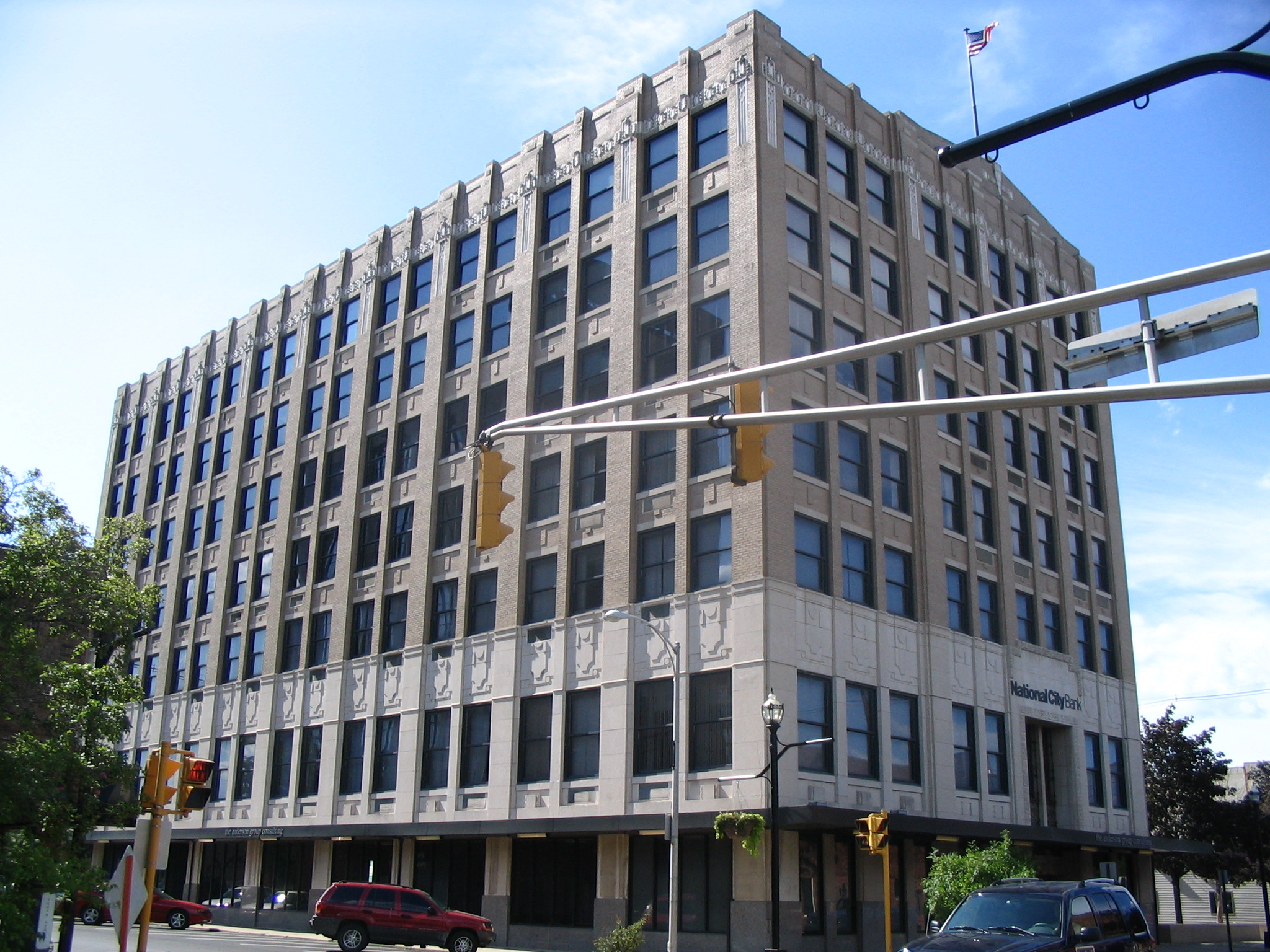
- Location: 931 Meridan St., Anderson, Indiana
- Coordinates: 40°6′23″N 85°40′47″W
- Area: less than one acre
- Architect: Kurt Vonnegut (Colvin, Leslie, Vonnegut, Bohn & Mueller)
- Architectural style: Art Deco
- NRHP reference No.: 84001078
- Added to NRHP: March 21, 1985

The Anderson Bank Building is a historic bank building located at Anderson, Indiana in the United States. It was built for the Anderson Banking Company in 1927. The bank building is located at 931 Meridan Street. The Anderson Banking Company began business on January 30, 1890. It was the only bank in Anderson to survive the Great Depression without closing. In 1985, the bank was acquired by Merchants National Corporation of Indianapolis. In 1991 Merchants National Corporation was acquired by National City Bank. National City Bank still operates a branch in the Anderson Bank Building.

The art deco details at the exterior street level and in the main banking lobby have been somewhat obliterated due to water damage. The building's main architectural interest lies in the still existent art deco detailing in the building's elevator lobby and upper floors.
