= Vonnegut Hardware Company =

Indianapolis retailer, 1852–1965

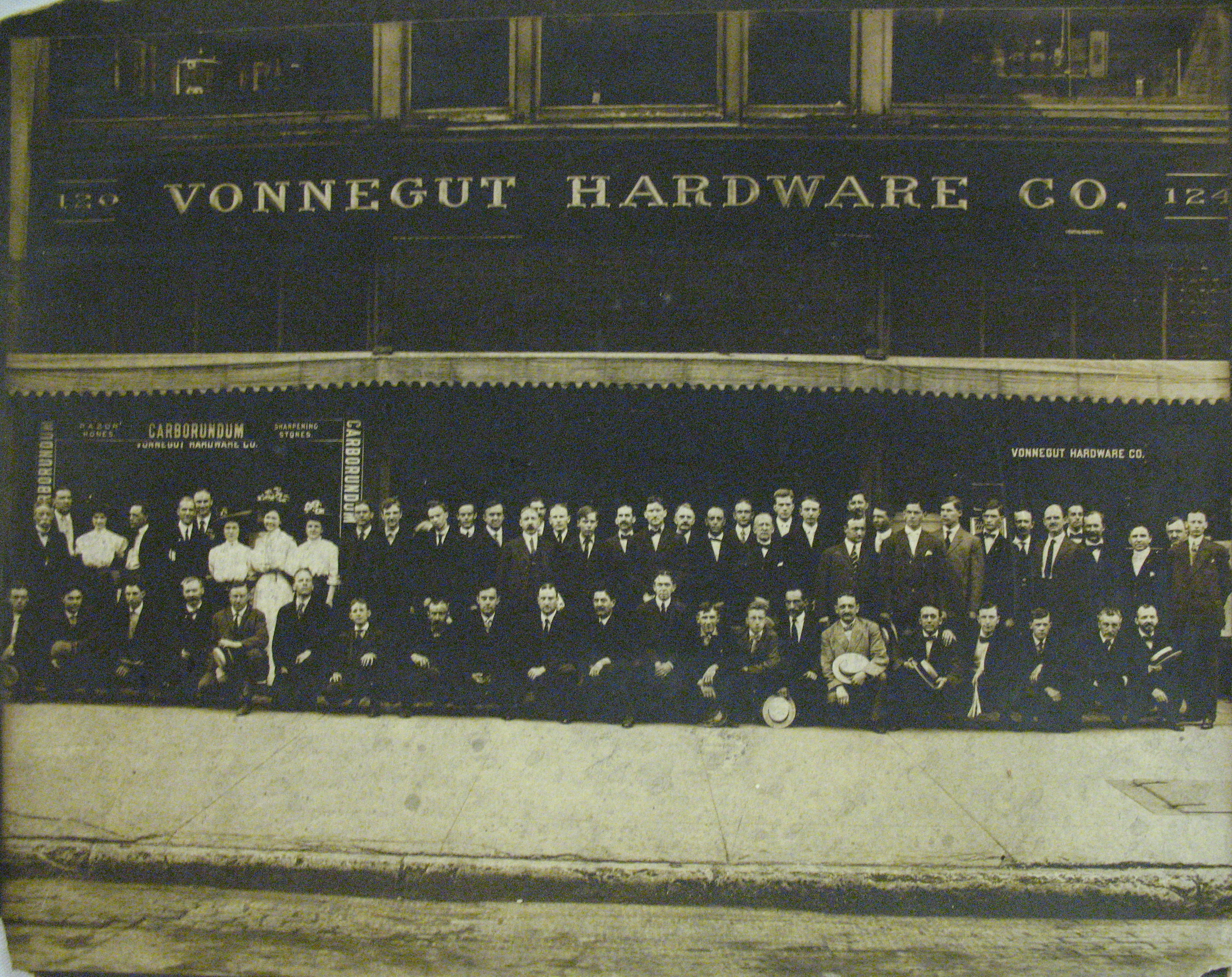
Employee gathering at flagship store, 120–124 W. Washington St., Indianapolis, IN – 1906, Clemens Vonnegut far left edge with white mustache and Richard E Kremp top row 9th from right

The Vonnegut Hardware Company was an Indianapolis hardware store that operated from 1852 to 1965. It was founded by Clemens Vonnegut Sr., a German former textile ribbon salesman from Amsterdam, who arrived in Indianapolis around 1851.

== Indianapolis ==
Indiana was granted statehood in 1816, and the Indiana General Assembly actively sought a site to establish a new State capital. In 1821, the Indiana State Legislature approved both the site and the name Indianapolis. On January 1, 1825, the State capital was moved from Corydon to Indianapolis. By 1830, the population of Indianapolis had grown to around 1,000 people, and by 1835, Indianapolis was incorporated. The population of Indianapolis had reached over 8,000 people by 1850, and was then ranked the 87th largest urban area in the United States. During this time, The roads were primarily made of dirt, but the surface of the National Road was cobblestone as it ran through the city. Within the "mile square" known as Indianapolis, wooden plank road surfaces diverged north and south of the great National Road. Railroads facilitated trade, bringing merchandise and settlers into the area. "Mechanics of every handicraft" had found their way to Indianapolis, and by 1855, the population of Indianapolis had doubled to 16,000 people.

The Vonnegut Hardware Company benefited from the rapid population growth of Indianapolis. In 1850, just two years before Vonnegut was founded, the city of Indianapolis had a population of 8,091. By 1900 the population of Indianapolis had grown to 169,164 (ranked as the 21st largest urban area in the United States). By 1960 Indianapolis had a population of 476,258.

== Early hardware business in the 1800s ==
In 1852 Clemens Vonnegut Sr. (1824–1906) entered into a partnership with fellow German Charles Volmer opening a hardware store in Indianapolis. Their merchandising store was called C Volmer & Vonnegut Hardware.

The original establishment was a one-room storefront at 71 West Washington Street or National Road as it was then called. The site was directly opposite the Washington Hall.

Initially, C Volmer & Vonnegut Hardware would sell hardware, groceries, dry goods, coffin fittings, animal hides, and leather, along with agricultural, carpentry, butchering and harness-making supplies. Much of the merchandise was simply stacked outside on the wooden sidewalk for customers to browse and select. Given many customers arrived only after making arduous journeys, the proprietors would make cheese, crackers and a cool mug of Madison ale available to customers. The cheese, cracker and ale tradition continued from 1852 to approximately 1867.

There is some confusion regarding the business departure of Charles Volmer. One accounting is that Volmer left to go out West and was never heard from again. Another version of the story is that Volmer retired in 1857. Clemens Vonnegut's son Franklin would later reflect that Volmer simply went across the street and opened a grocery and liquor business. Volmer and Vonnegut Sr. dissolved their partnership in 1856, and by 1857 the retail hardware store was renamed Clemens Vonnegut Hardware and Charles Volmer was no longer affiliated with the enterprise. In 1858, Charles Volmer was operating a wholesale wine, liquor, and cigar distributorship at 95 East Washington Street, Indianapolis. By 1865, there was no longer a record of Charles Volmer in Indianapolis.

At about the same time the partnership was dissolved, Clemens Vonnegut moved his hardware store to 338 East Washington Street. He also moved his family into the apartment above the store. Vonnegut Sr. would not stay at this address very long.

By 1858, the business would move to 142 East Washington Street. The family would also accompany this move taking-up residency in the apartment above the store.

In 1865, Clemens Vonnegut Hardware was operating out of a much larger building located at 178–180 East Washington Street. The Vonnegut family would also reside above this storefront.

Clemens and his wife, Katharina Blank Vonnegut (1828–1904) had four children, all boys. Three of their four sons were born in an apartment above their hardware store. The four children were Clemens Jr. (1853–1921), Bernard (1855–1908), Franklin (1856–1952) and George (1860–1952). Franklin often quipped that they probably took him downstairs to weigh him.

In 1866, the Vonnegut Sr. family would move to a small home located at 508 East Market Street. They would later move to 504 East Market Street. In 1897, Clemens and his wife Katharina would move to 1002 East Market.

Clemens Vonnegut Sr. has been described as "sophisticated" and "eccentric", and was known for wearing a cape and carrying rocks to help strengthen his bicep muscles. He possessed a strong work ethic, was diplomatic, and was an early Indianapolis visionary.

Many hard-working German farmers settled near Indianapolis. Over time, many came to look at Vonnegut Sr. as their friend and trusted advisor. Rather than trust a small, local bank, some would entrust their money to Vonnegut Sr. for safekeeping and investment. When the banks had grown larger, and Vonnegut Sr. considered them safe, he communicated that he did not want to continue this depository service. Reluctantly, his friends then took their deposits to the bank.

Around 1874, the business would move to 184–186 East Washington Street, a three-floor building with a basement that spanned an area of twenty-two by one-hundred ninety-five feet. The new location was in close proximity to the popular Little's Hotel, providing new customers.

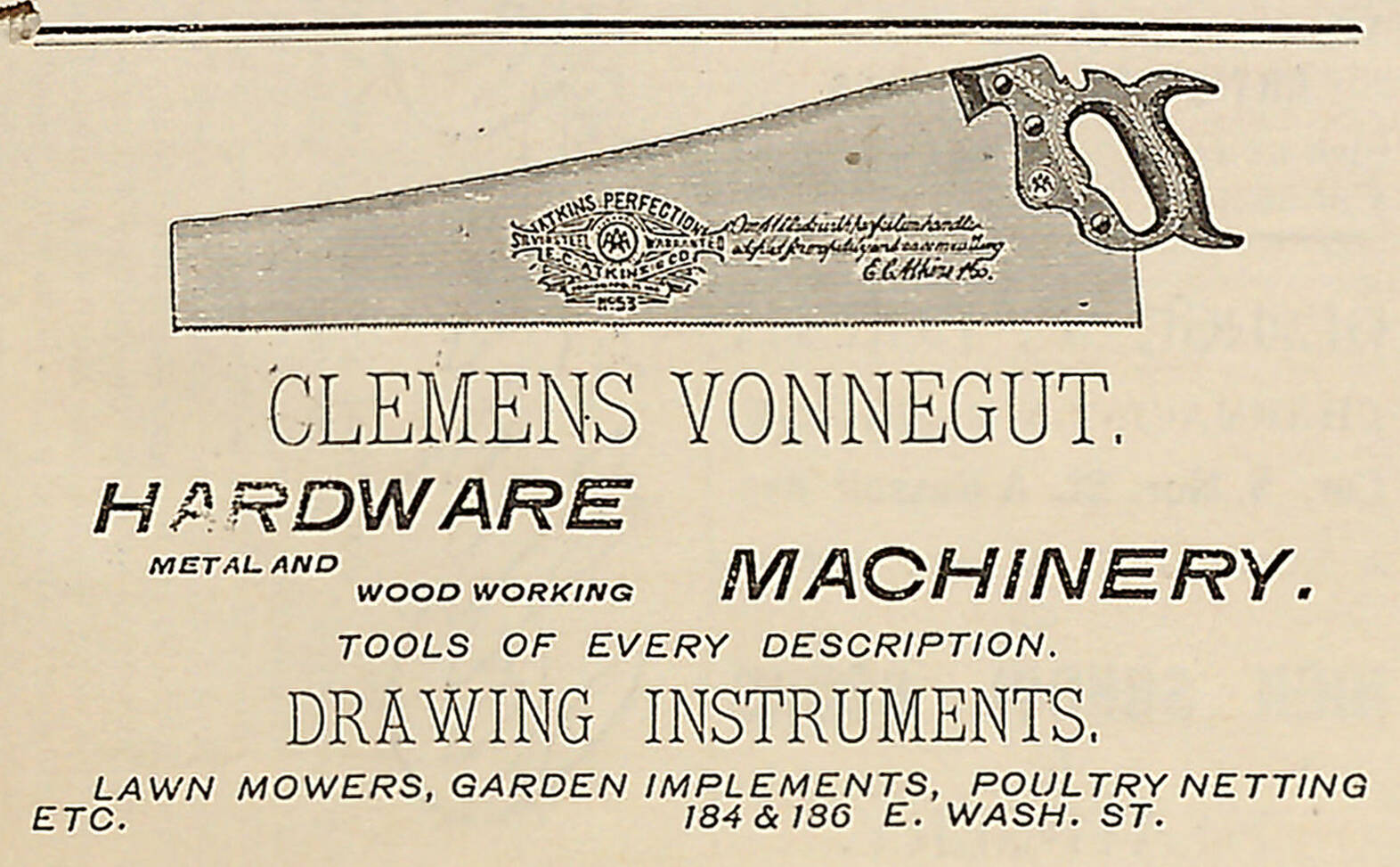
1895 advertisement for the 184–186 East Washington Street location.

In 1898, Vonnegut Sr. would purchase property at 342–348 East Washington Street and, briefly, move his business to that location.

A year later, Vonnegut Sr. would once again move his store, this time to 120–124 East Washington Street, selling his building at 342 East Washington to former US president Benjamin Harrison. The new building located on the north side of Washington Street between Pennsylvania and Delaware Streets, spanned an area approximately forty-five by one-hundred ninety-five feet at its base, and was a five-story building with a full basement. Merchandising took place on multiple floors, along with administrative offices and storage. In 1925, Vonnegut purchased the Lilly Hardware Company, he also purchased Lilly's three-story building located at 114–118 East Washington Street. Since this location was adjacent to the Vonnegut store at 120–124 East Washington Street, an archway was cut between the two buildings to merge them.

Even prior to 1900, Vonnegut Sr. found it necessary to maintain a separate warehouse. This facility was located at 746 South Delaware St, Indianapolis, IN. The building on this site measured thirty-six by one-hundred fifty feet at its base, and was served by a railroad siding along the west end (originally served by the Pittsburgh, Cincinnati, Chicago and St Louis Railroad).

By 1892, sixty-eight-year-old Clemens Vonnegut Sr. had ceded the day-to-day operation of his store to children Clemens Jr., Franklin, Bernard and George. While not an official ownership document, the Indianapolis City Directories from 1892 through 1905 listed the four Vonnegut children as principals along with their father. By 1899, the firm was no longer referred to as Clemens Vonnegut Hardware but rather as the Vonnegut Hardware Company.

Clemens Vonnegut Sr. died on December 13, 1908, shortly after the passing of his wife, Katharina Vonnegut, on April 12, 1904. Four years later, his four sons, Clemens Jr., Franklin, Bernard and George filed to incorporate the enterprise as The Vonnegut Hardware Company.

== Hardware firm in the 1900s ==
Clemens Jr., Franklin and George would work in the hardware store operations on and off for the better part of their lives. Bernard attended the Massachusetts Institute of Technology and the Polytechnic Institute of Hanover, Germany. He would become a noted architect (Vonnegut & Bohn Architects and later, Vonnegut, Bohn & Mueller Architects). The popular author Kurt Vonnegut was Bernard's grandson.

In 1908, Franklin "Frank" Vonnegut (third son) took over as the company's president, continuing to work in the business for the rest of his life; George Vonnegut would become the secretary and treasurer of the company.

Carl Prinzler, an Indianapolis native, was hired by Vonnegut in 1886 at age 16. In 1895, he was entitled manager of the art-hardware and building material department. By 1908, Prinzer, working in conjunction with his Indianapolis neighbor, architect Harry H. Dupont, would develop and receive US patent protection for what would later come to be known in the industry as panic bar door hardware. Under an arrangement involving the Vonnegut Hardware Company, Prinzler and Dupont, the patents would be assigned to Vonnegut for the manufacture, sale and distribution of what soon would be called the Von Duprin Safe Exit Device. In its first year of production, 1908, Prinzler was selected to supervise the production and assembly of the device. Prinzler was named a director of Vonnegut in 1910. In all, Prinzler would proudly serve Vonnegut for over 50 years. Prinzler died on May 30, 1949.

In 1906, Richard E. Kremp was referred to The Vonnegut Hardware Co by Central (Indiana) Business College. Vonnegut offered Kremp the position of stenographer and bookkeeper in the Accounts Payable Department. Thus began his 54-year association with the company. Kremp was named office manager in 1922, elected treasurer in 1931, general manager in 1932, and president of the company In 1943. He was later elected chairman of board, holding this position until his retirement in February 1961. He was described as being a generous, approachable and respectable man who led by example. Richard E. Kremp died on September 15, 1961.

Vonnegut Hardware Company retail stores were a popular and trusted shopping destination. With the advancement of time, Vonnegut changed its inventory to meet the needs of a growing populace. Vonnegut sold quality hardware, housewares, sporting goods, radios, watches, toys, yard supplies, gardening tools, sportswear, and much more. The downtown store also sold firearms, a full line of photography equipment, fireplace fixtures and other specialty items. Through the Vonnegut catalog one could order from even a wider array of items. Vonnegut customers developed the catch phrase, "You Can Get It All At Vonnegut's", and the company often used it in its advertising.

When Carl Prinzler started his illustrious career at Vonnegut in 1886, he recalls a total work force of under twelve employees. From time to time Vonnegut bought out other hardware stores in the Indianapolis market. He purchased the Francke Hardware Company in 1910. In 1925, Vonnegut Hardware purchased the Lilly Hardware Company (34 new Vonnegut employees). Vonnegut purchased the Fountain Square Hardware Store from Alfred Obergfell in 1931. The Fountain Square store, located at 1116 Prospect Street, continued to operate under The Vonnegut Hardware Company name. Alfred's son, Robert Obergfell, managed the store as an employee of Vonnegut.

Under Kremp's leadership, Vonnegut pioneered the concept of "neighborhood selling" by branching out from the downtown Indianapolis flagship store. In the year of 1930, Vonnegut opened its first, full-line neighborhood shopping location in Irvington, approximately five and a half miles due east of the center of downtown Indianapolis. Within a few years, Vonnegut had 12 such neighborhood shopping stores within Marion County.

Within its downtown and neighborhood shopping stores, employees often conducted public training on topics such as woodworking, plumbing, hobbies and home repair. Oftentimes, manufacturer representatives would conduct presentations in the Vonnegut stores showing Vonnegut customers how best to use their products. Vonnegut Hardware Co was a regular exhibitor at trade and public shows, such as the Indiana Retail Hardware Association convention, the Indianapolis Sports, Vacation and Boat Show and the Indianapolis Home Show.

Vonnegut was also a pioneer in offering customers various credit options such as 30-day accounts, charge plates, weekly or monthly payment terms and budget accounts.

In 1940, Vonnegut constructed a new multi-purpose building at 402 West Maryland Street. Designed by the Indianapolis architectural firm of Vonnegut, Bohn and Mueller, this modern, six-story building contained 350,000 square feet and was built at an approximate cost of $500,000. 402 West Maryland was designed primarily for the mill supply and industrial supply divisions. Mill supply, paint jobbing and other services would move from 120 East Washington Street to the Maryland Street building. Much of the space was devoted to the manufacture and assembly of the Von Duprin Safe Exit Device. This building served as a general warehouse, and housed the commercial and industrial sale staff. This was also the site of administrative offices, an auditorium and an employee cafeteria. Vonnegut held to a standard of practice that commercial product orders received by 11 am would be fulfilled by 1 pm on the same day.

By 1950, the Vonnegut mill supplies division covered all of Indiana and some of the adjoining territories in Ohio, Illinois, Michigan and Kentucky.

In early December 1952, the downtown store on Washington Street suffered a 2-alarm fire during lunchtime hours. The fire was mostly contained to the fifth floor which was used as a warehouse for the storage of toys. At the height of the fire the water within the 50,000-gallon tank atop the building began to move and steam. The insured loss was said to be $215,000. No one was injured and the building was restored.

In 1957, Vonnegut moved its downtown store to a new location at 18–20 N. Pennsylvania St., Indianapolis.

With stores located throughout Marion County, Vonnegut Hardware Co was largely known in Indianapolis for the efforts of its retail division. While the retail division generally thrived after The Great Depression, it provided only a small proportion of the firm's annual sales volume. Vonnegut worked directly with a large number of high quality manufactures who allowed Vonnegut to distribute its products. In turn, Vonnegut maintained a network of several hundred merchant dealers throughout Indiana. These independent retail hardware dealers sold Vonnegut supplied products to their local customers. Thus, Vonnegut supplied products were finding their way into homes and businesses all over Indiana.

Vonnegut also maintained the wholesale trade of tools and supplies to contractors directly engaged in the construction trades.

The Vonnegut mill supply and industrial supply divisions marketed tools, hardware and supplies directly to commercial clientele and industrial firms within the region. Among its larger industrial clients were: ALCOA, RCA Victor, Overmyer Mold Company, Lynch Corporation, International Harvester, Cummins Engine and Arvin Industries, Perfect Circle Corporation, Ball Brothers, Allison Division of General Motors Corporation, Union Carbide and Chemical Corporation, Guide Lamp, Delco Remy Divisions of General Motors Corporation, Delco Radio, and Delco Battery Divisions of General Motors Corporation.

Through an extensive network of sales representatives, Vonnegut marketed the Von Duprin Safe Exit Device in every principal city in the United States. Von Duprin Safe Exit Devices were originally manufactured, polished and assembled in Indianapolis; however, in order to facilitate high demand and distribution, additional manufacturing sites were chosen in North Chicago and Belleville, Ontario, Canada. Vonnegut's far-reaching network of sales representatives caused the Von Duprin Safe Exit Device to be installed in schools, auditoriums, churches, libraries, government buildings, theaters and other public and private buildings throughout the United States and other countries. Among the many thousands buildings that would feature the Von Duprin Safe Exit Device were The United Nations Building, the Statler Center and Hotel, and the Severin Hotel. Even prior to 1925, Von Duprin Safe Exit Devices were shipped to Japan, Australia and a few South American countries.

The Von Duprin Safe Exit Device has been credited for saving Vonnegut from financial ruin during The Great Depression.

Fred H. Johnson, a consultant to the wholesale hardware trade in Florida and a former executive officer with Marshall-Wells Company, Shapleigh Hardware Company, and the Lufkin Rule Company of Canada, served as the company's president and board member from 1961 to 1965. Johnson was a graduate of the University of Toronto.

== Dedicated Vonnegut employees ==
By the 1950s, Vonnegut employed in excess of three hundred people. Vonnegut maintained an employee-centered corporate culture; activities were regularly planned for the employees to participate in, such as the Vonnegut bowling league. Vonnegut also had its own semi-professional band, led by employee Edwin E. Kerner, who also played the viola, violin, and alto horn.

Fred W. Hess, department manager wholesale and industrial supplies division was hired at 13 years old, serving Vonnegut for 69 years. Many employees of Vonnegut Hardware Co. such as, Oscar Mueller, Frank Blank, William Klinhenz, Theodore Rugenstein, Ed Snyder, Al Brocking, Maurice Schultz, Homer A. Eichacker, Carl Brocking, Albert Stich, Al Gruman, Clarence Childers, Carl J. Prinzler, Edward J. Galm Sr. and Richard E. Kremp, were employed for over 45 years.

== Sale of hardware firm ==
By 1965, with the involvement of the Boston investment banking firm of State Street Investments, Vonnegut Hardware Company was sold to the Schlage Lock Company, San Francisco. Around 1965–1966, Schlage resold the retail components of Vonnegut to Indianapolis developer Warren Atkinson and a few Vonnegut Hardware Company employees. The Schlage Lock Company retained all ownership interest in and to the industrial trade name Von Duprin and its products. Von Duprin continues to manufacture and distribute security-related products under its present-day holding company, Allegion. Under Atkinson, et al., the retail division was renamed Vonnegut, Inc., and Edward J. Galm Jr. became its president. A number of the retail stores were operated in the 1970s; however, by 1980, the hardware stores were all closed or merged into other operating entities.

The Vonnegut Industrial Products division was also sold as part of the 1965 sale of the parent company. The sale price for the Vonnegut Industrial Products division was reported to be $3 million. The new owners, a group of former Vonnegut employees, incorporated under the name of Vonnegut Industrial Products, Inc. William H. Holbrook became the President, and Everal Downing was named Vice President of Sales. This new entity expanded by purchasing a warehouse in Evansville, Indiana, to better serve southern Indiana and Kentucky. By 1989, Vonnegut Industrial Products, Inc, with annual estimated sales of $40 million, was sold and merged into W W Grainger of Chicago, IL.

== A "grand family" ==
The Vonnegut family was prominent in Indianapolis, many members taking lead roles in civic and Indianapolis business affairs. Clemens Vonnegut Sr. served on the Indianapolis Board of Schools for 27 years. Public School No. 9 at 407 Fulton Street, Indianapolis would later bear his name. His son Franklin succeeded him on the Indianapolis Board of Schools and Theodore F. Vonnegut would also assume this role in the 1920s.
