= Kurt Vonnegut Sr. =

American architect

- Born: November 24, 1884; Indianapolis, Indiana, U.S.
- Died: October 1, 1957 (aged 72); Indianapolis, Indiana, U.S.
- Occupation: Architect
- Known for: Partner in Vonnegut & Bohn, Vonnegut, Bohn & Mueller, and Vonnegut, Wright & Yeager
- Children: Bernard Vonnegut; Alice Vonnegut; Kurt Vonnegut Jr.

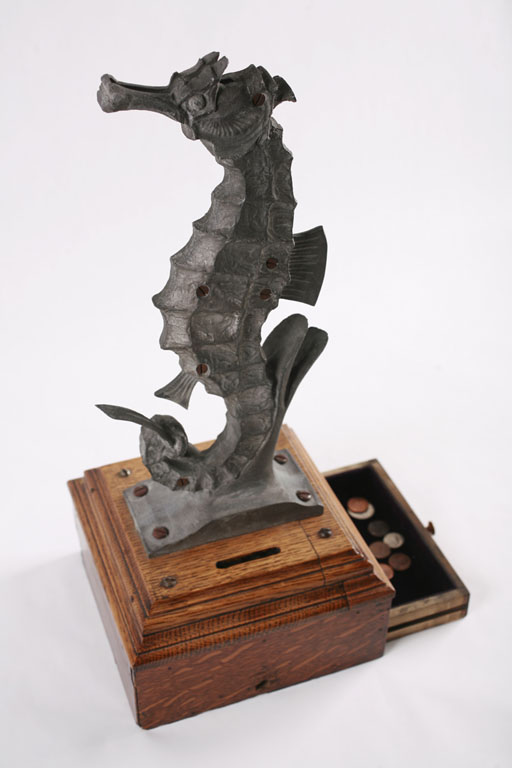
A Seahorse money box created by Vonnegut which served as the first monetary donation box for The Children's Museum of Indianapolis

Kurt Vonnegut Sr. (November 24, 1884 – October 1, 1957) was an American architect and architectural lecturer active in early- to mid-20th-century Indianapolis, Indiana. A member of the American Institute of Architects, he was partner in the firms of Vonnegut & Bohn, Vonnegut, Bohn & Mueller, and Vonnegut, Wright & Yeager. He designed several churches, banks, and became the in-house architect for Indiana Bell and Hooks Drug stores (prior to World War II), practicing extensively in the Art Deco style. He was the father of chemist Bernard Vonnegut and author Kurt Vonnegut Jr.

== Early life and education ==
Kurt Vonnegut Sr. was born on November 24, 1884, in Indianapolis, Indiana, to Nannie Vonnegut (née Schnull; 1859 – 1929), daughter of Henry Schnull, and Bernard Vonnegut I (1855 – 1908), an architect and partner in the well-established firm of Vonnegut & Bohn. He attended grammar school from 1890 to 1898 (Indianapolis Public School No. 10) and Shortridge High School. Vonnegut attended the American College in Strasbourg for three years from around 1902 and earned a Bachelor of Science in architecture from the Massachusetts Institute of Technology in 1908. That same year, he continued his studies in Berlin, and was admitted to the Königliche Akademie der Künste for the semester 1908–1909. He was traveling "with his widowed mother and his sister, Irma" (later Irma Vonnegut Lindener), returning in 1910 to join his father's surviving partner, Arthur Bohn.

== Practice ==
Vonnegut joined as a partner in Vonnegut & Bohn, and while there he joined the University Club and taught lettering at the Herron Art Institute from 1912 to 1913 and architectural history from 1913 to 1915, and headed the Art Association of Indianapolis' Art School Committee from 1915 to 1927. He designed the original logo for the Indianapolis Children's Museum.

The firm did little during the Great Depression and eventually the firm was renamed Vonnegut, Bohn & Mueller Architects with the addition of another partner.

In 1946, Kurt Vonnegut Sr. was the sole partner and merged with the firms Pierre & Wright (of Indianapolis, Indiana) and Miller & Yeager (of Terre Haute, Indiana) to form Vonnegut, Wright & Yeager, which was located at 1126 Hume Mansur Building, Indianapolis, and 402 Opera House Building, Terre Haute.

== Personal life ==
On November 22, 1913, Vonnegut married Edith Sophia Lieber (d. May 14, 1944), the daughter of millionaire Indianapolis brewer Albert Lieber and Alice Barus, who had died of pneumonia when Edith was six. Shortly thereafter, Albert Lieber married Ora D. Lane, and later Meda Langtry, a widow near the same age as Edith. Kurt and Edith Vonnegut had had three children: Bernard Vonnegut (1914–1997), Alice Vonnegut (1917–1958); and Kurt Vonnegut Jr. (1922–2007).

Through Lieber's father, a trust fund from Lieber's grandfather (Peter Lieber), an inheritance from Vonnegut's mother, and Vonnegut's architectural practice, the family was upper-middle class, although during the Great Depression the Leiber brewery went bankrupt and Vonnegut & Bohn produced next to nothing. Around this time, Vonnegut designed and built a large brick residence for his family located at 4401 N. Illinois Street in Indianapolis. The home was heavily mortgaged and was eventually sold during the Depression. A smaller house was designed and built in the suburban development of Williams Creek, Indiana, in 1941. Its basement featured a small shop with a kiln for ceramics.

The Vonnegut children attended good schools: Bernard attended Park School and earned a Bachelor of Science and PhD in Chemistry from Massachusetts Institute of Technology; Alice attended Tudor Hall School for Girls; Kurt Jr. attended private schools until the third grade, when he was removed for financial reasons, then attended Indianapolis Public School No. 43, Shortridge High School and Cornell University, where he studied physics, chemistry, and math before enlisting in the U.S. Army as a private during World War II.

Following Edith's death in 1944, Kurt remained somewhat isolated, eventually moving to a small cottage near Nashville, Indiana. Kurt was a lifetime smoker, suffered from emphysema, and died on October 1, 1957, at his home from lung cancer without treatment. He was buried on October 3, 1957, in the Vonnegut lot in Crown Hill Cemetery next to his wife and parents.

Kurt Vonnegut Jr. wrote of his brother's profession, his mother's death, and of his father as an architect, writing in Hocus Pocus that "Another flaw in the human character is that everybody wants to build and nobody wants to do maintenance."

== Works ==
- The first building of All Souls Unitarian Church, 1453 N. Alabama Street, Indianapolis, Indiana
- Anderson Bank Building in Anderson, Indiana
- He also designed signature Art Deco buildings for Indiana Bell throughout the state and new buildings for Hooks Drug stores prior to World War II
- Indiana Bell Telephone Building in Indianapolis, Indiana
- The Schultz Department Store (1913), 216 N. Fourth Street, Lafayette, Indiana, now called the Schultz Walgamuth Building
- Kurt Vonnegut Sr. residence (c. 1929), 4365 North Illinois Street, Indianapolis, 4th Ward Washington Township, Marion County, Indiana
- Kurt Vonnegut Sr. residence in Williams Creek, Indiana (1941)
