= Marburg (disambiguation) =

Marburg is a town in Hesse, Germany.

Marburg may also refer to:

Places

- Marburger Schloss, a castle in Marburg, Germany
- University of Marburg, the principal university in the city of Marburg, Germany
- Maribor, Slovenia (also known as Marburg an der Drau before the dissolution of Austria-Hungary)
  - University of Maribor, a university in the city of Maribor, Slovenia
- Marburg, South Africa, a settlement in KwaZulu–Natal
- Marburg, Queensland, Australia, a rural town
- Marburg (Virginia), a historic home in Richmond, Virginia

People

- Konrad von Marburg (1180-1233), Inquisitor
- Otto Marburg (1874-1948), Austrian neurologist
- Theodore Marburg (1862-1946), American jurist, diplomat, and internationalist
- Theodore Marburg Jr. (1893-1922), American who flew with the Royal Flying Corps in WWI
- William August Marburg (born 1931), American bluegrass musician known as Bill Clifton
- James Marburg (b. 1982), Australian rower

Medicine

- Marburgvirus, a virologic taxon (genus)
- Marburg virus, a virus causing viral hemorrhagic fever in humans
- Marburg virus disease, the disease caused by Marburg virus
- Marburg multiple sclerosis, malignant form of multiple sclerosis

Other

- Marburg Colloquy, a 1529 meeting at Marburg Castle between leaders of the Reformation
- Marburg Files, a series of top-secret foreign minister archives discovered in Germany

See also

- Friedrich Wilhelm Marpurg (1718-1795), German critic, theorist and composer
