= Harris S. Hawthorne =

American Civil War Medal of Honor recipient

Harris Smith Hawthorne
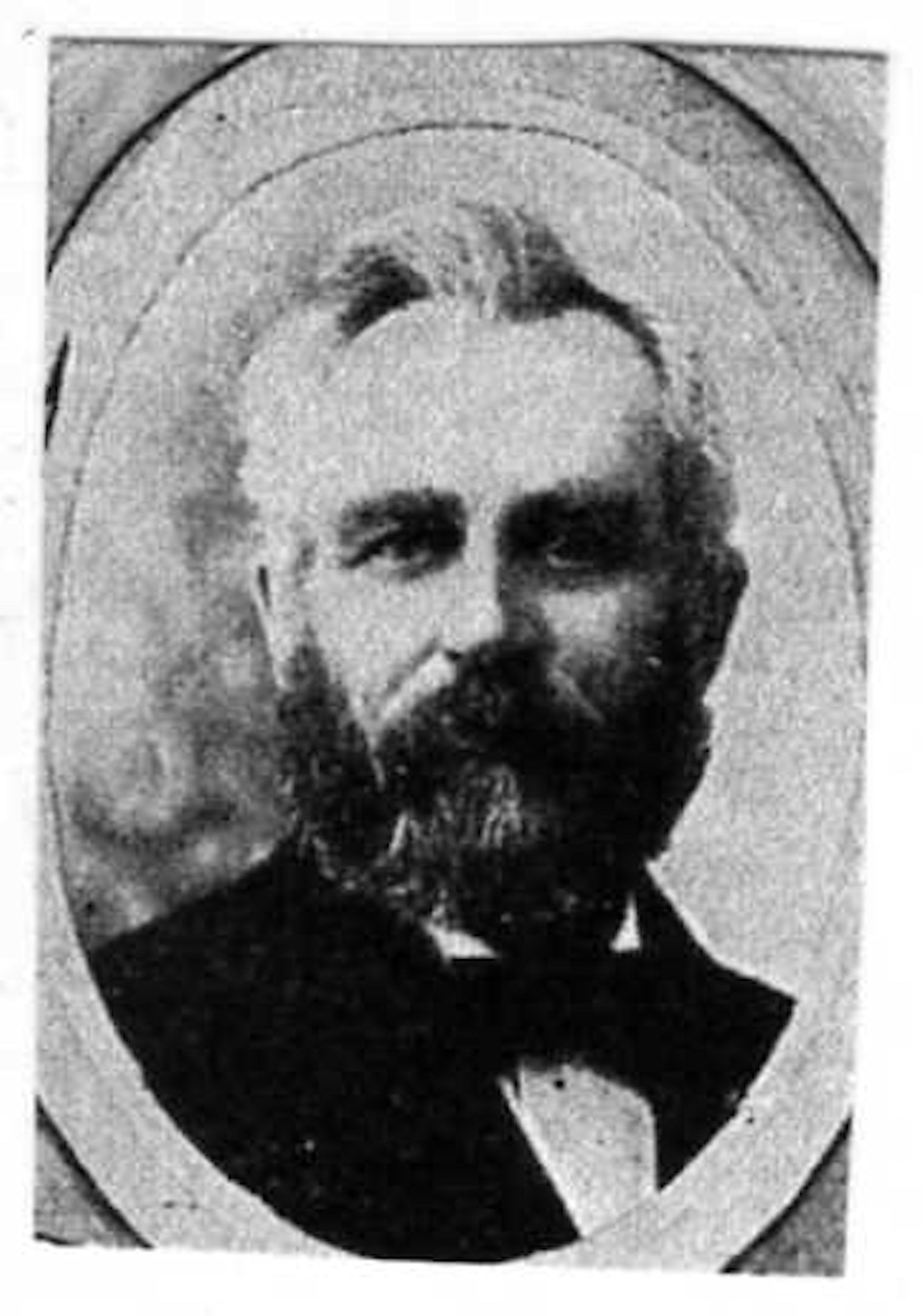
- Hawthorne in c. 1898
- Born: February 29, 1832; Salem, New York
- Died: March 23, 1911 (aged 79); Hoosick Falls, New York
- Burial place: Maple Grove Cemetery, Hoosick, New York
- Military career
- Allegiance: United States
- Branch: United States Army
- Rank: Corporal
- Units: (New York (state)) Company F, 121st New York Volunteer Infantry
- Conflicts: American Civil War; Battle of Sailor's Creek
- Awards: Medal of Honor

Harris Smith Hawthorne (February 29, 1832 – March 23, 1911) was a Union Army soldier in the American Civil War who received the U.S. military's highest decoration, the Medal of Honor.

He was awarded the Medal of Honor for extraordinary heroism shown on April 6, 1865, during the Battle of Sailor's Creek, where he captured Robert E. Lee's son, George Washington Custis Lee, while serving as a corporal with Company F, 121st New York Volunteer Infantry. His Medal of Honor was awarded on December 29, 1894.

A competing claim for the capture of Lee was made in 1897 by David Dunnels White, a soldier of the 37th Massachusetts Infantry Volunteers. The claim was turned down by the U.S Army. In 2011, White's descendants submitted another claim which was also rejected. Their theory seems to be that Lee escaped after his initial detainment by White and was recaptured by Hawthorne.

Hawthorne died at the age of 79 on March 23, 1911, and was buried at Maple Grove Cemetery, Hoosick, New York.

== Medal of Honor citation ==
Capture of Confederate Maj. Gen. George Washington Custis Lee

== See also ==
- Battle of Sailor's Creek
- George Washington Custis Lee
- David Dunnels White
