= Oliver Edwards =

American major general in the Union Army

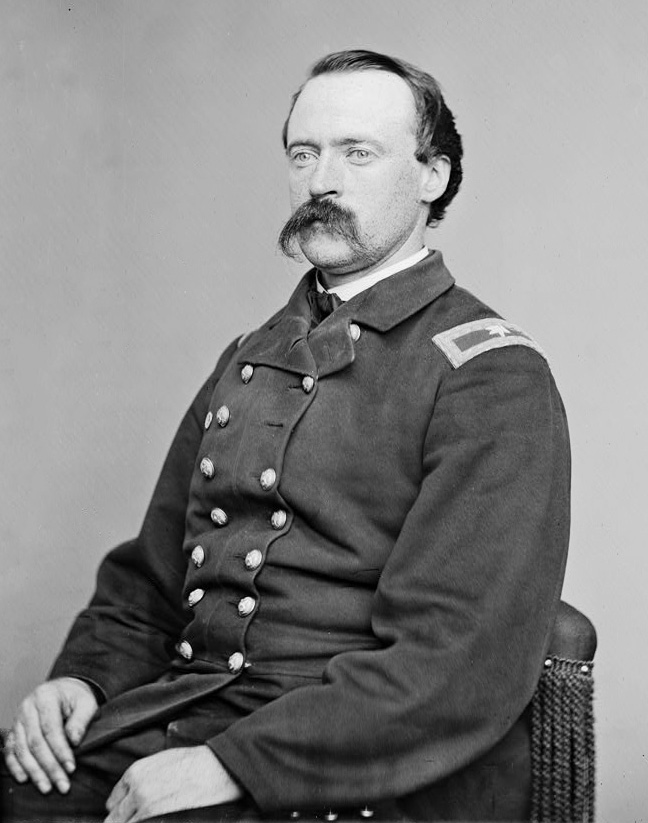
- Born: January 30, 1835; Springfield, Massachusetts
- Died: April 28, 1904 (aged 69); Warsaw, Illinois
- Burial place: Oakland Cemetery, Warsaw, Illinois
- Military career
- Allegiance: United States of America
- Branch: United States Army; Union Army
- Service years: 1861–1866
- Rank: Brevet Major General
- Commands: 37th Regiment Massachusetts Volunteer Infantry; Provisional brigade to quell New York Draft Riots; 4th Brigade, 2nd Division, VI Corps; 3rd Brigade, 1st Division, VI Corps; 1st Division, VI Corps; Commandant, Winchester, Virginia
- Conflicts: American Civil War
- Other work: Superintendent, Florence Machine Company; General Manager, Gardner Machine and Gun Company

Oliver Edwards (January 30, 1835 – April 28, 1904) was a machine company executive, an inventor, and a volunteer officer in the Union Army during the American Civil War.

Raised in Springfield, Massachusetts, Edwards moved to Illinois as a young man to pursue a career as a manager of manufacturing. At the start of the Civil War, he became adjutant of the 10th Regiment Massachusetts Volunteer Infantry and later aide-de-camp to Brigadier General Darius N. Couch. In the fall of 1862, he took command of the 37th Regiment Massachusetts Volunteer Infantry as colonel and led that unit through numerous major battles, including the Battle of Gettysburg. Just after Gettysburg, in July 1863, he was placed in command of a provisional brigade sent to assist in quelling the New York Draft Riots. During the Overland Campaign in the spring of 1864, he was placed in command of a brigade and, during the Valley Campaigns of 1864 he was briefly placed in command of a division of the VI Corps. For his service during these campaigns, Edwards was awarded the honorary rank of brevet brigadier general and later promoted to full grade brigadier general United States Volunteers. In 1866 he was awarded the honorary rank of brevet major general, United States Volunteers, to rank from April 5, 1865, for his service during the Appomattox Campaign.

After the war, Edwards returned to a career in manufacturing, most notably as manager of the Florence Machine Company in Northampton, Massachusetts and the Gardner Machine and Gun Company in England.

== Early career ==
Edwards was born in Springfield, Massachusetts, in 1835, the son of Dr. Elisha Edwards and Eunice Lombard Edwards. From an early age, he had a strong interest in mechanics and, rather than attend college, he obtained an apprenticeship at the Springfield Armory. In 1856, at age 21, Edwards moved to the American Midwest to establish his own foundry, eventually settling in Warsaw, Illinois. Here he became a partner in a new foundry known as Neberling, Edwards and Co.

== Civil War service ==
=== Adjutant and Aide-de-camp ===
At the start of the Civil War in 1861, Edwards returned to Massachusetts with the intention to enlist as a private. During May and early June 1861, he recruited a company of men from Springfield which became part of the 10th Massachusetts Infantry. Upon the mustering in of the 10th Massachusetts, Edwards was offered an officer's commission as a first lieutenant and assigned the role of adjutant—a primarily administrative position assisting Colonel Henry Shaw Briggs who commanded the regiment.

Edwards saw little action during his service with the 10th in the fall of 1861, the regiment being primarily occupied with building fortifications in the vicinity of Washington, D.C. at that time. In January 1862, Brig. Gen. Darius N. Couch, in command of the division to which the 10th Massachusetts belonged, asked Edwards to be his aide-de-camp. Edwards occupied this administrative position throughout the Peninsular Campaign and the Northern Virginia Campaign, assisting Couch in coordinating the movements of his division.

=== 37th Massachusetts ===
On August 9, 1862, Edwards was promoted to major and recalled to Pittsfield, Massachusetts to assist in organizing the 37th Massachusetts Infantry. As the regiment was still being organized, Edwards was promoted to colonel and command of the 37th Massachusetts. The regiment arrived in Washington, D.C. during the first week of September 1862. They were soon attached to the Army of the Potomac, being assigned to the 2nd Brigade, 3rd Division of the VI Corps.

Edwards had already seen numerous battles, but his first experience as a field commander in combat occurred during the Battle of Fredericksburg on December 13, 1862. His regiment played a minor role in the fight, however, as their brigade was held in reserve during the battle.

During the Chancellorsville Campaign, Edwards and the 37th Massachusetts took part in the Second Battle of Fredericksburg and the Battle of Salem Church in May 1863. During the latter engagement, the 37th occupied the extreme left of the Union line—an exposed and dangerous position. After the battle, Maj. Gen. John Sedgwick extended his compliments to the 37th for holding their ground.

The 37th Massachusetts fought at the Battle of Gettysburg in July 1863. During the third day of fighting, the 37th was assigned a new position on the battle line and was en route when the Confederate heavy cannonade preceding Pickett's Charge began. Unlike most Union regiments which took cover during the cannonade, the 37th was forced to march to their new position during the bombardment, taking heavy casualties. Edwards was credited, however, with keeping the regiment together and bolstering their courage during the dangerous march.

=== New York Draft Riots ===
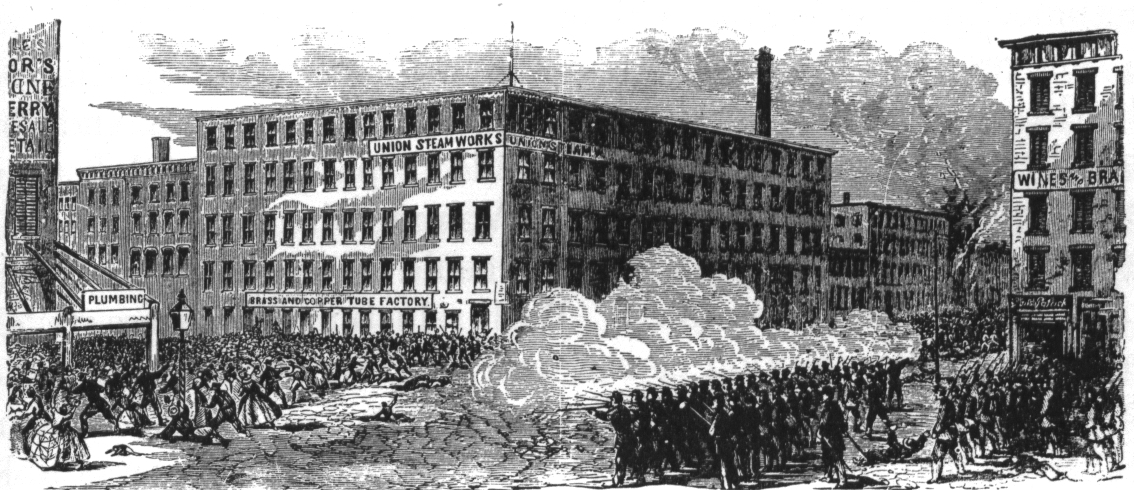
Federal troops fire on rioters in New York, 1863

On July 30, 1863, the 37th Massachusetts became one of a small number regiments from the Army of the Potomac hand picked for duty in New York in the wake of the Draft Riots. By the time the 37th reached New York, the worst of the rioting had ended, however a strong U.S. Army presence was required to keep peace until October 1863. During his time in New York, Edwards commanded a brigade stationed at Fort Hamilton in Brooklyn. Hearing that the presence of Massachusetts troops might spark further violence on the part of rioters, Edwards requested permission to place his regiment prominently as guards at a draft office, intending to demonstrate the bravery of his men in the face of threats. Despite the rumors, the presence of Edwards's regiment incited no further violence.

=== Brigade command ===
Returning to the Army of the Potomac in October 1863, Col. Edwards and the 37th Massachusetts took part in the Mine Run Campaign, then settled into winter camp with the rest of the Army of the Potomac. In the spring of 1864, the 37th was engaged in the Overland Campaign, a rapid series of severe battles during which Lt. Gen. Ulysses Grant attempted to grind down the Confederate army and capture the Confederate capital of Richmond.

During the Battle of the Wilderness on May 6, 1864, Edwards was ordered to lead the 37th Massachusetts on a dangerous charge to check a Confederate advance and to provide cover for Brig. Gen. James S. Wadsworth's retreating division. Edwards led the 37th forward as they cleared 900 yards (820 m) of ground, only to be surrounded by Confederates. The retreat of the regiment was orderly, keeping up a constant fire under Edwards's direction; however, the regiment suffered 25 percent casualties during the engagement.

After participating in the Battle of Spotsylvania, Edwards was promoted to command of the 4th Brigade, 2nd Division of the VI Corps. Edwards commanded this unit during the remainder of the Overland Campaign, including such engagements as the Battle of North Anna and the Battle of Cold Harbor.

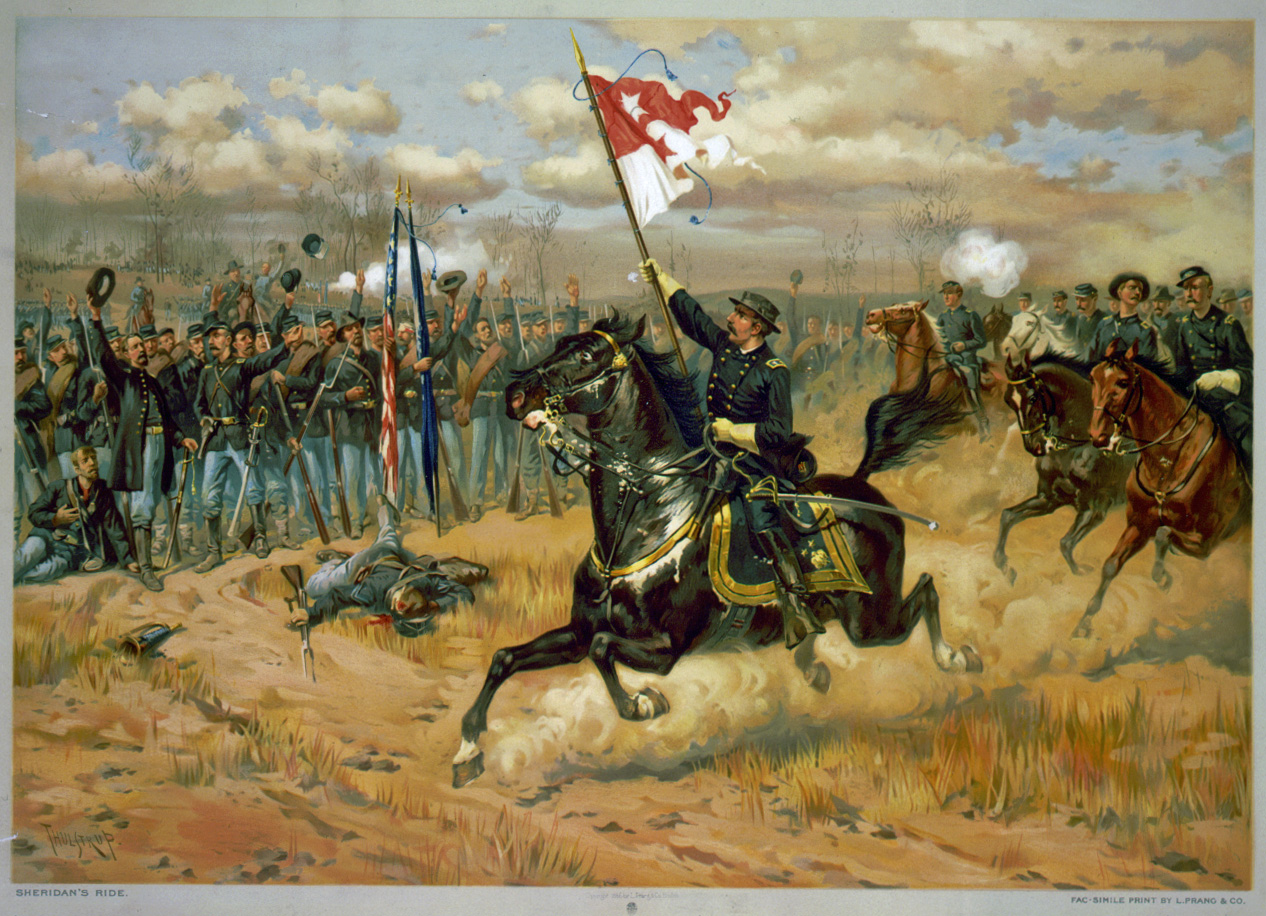
Maj. Gen. Phil Sheridan rallying troops at the Battle of Opequon, during which Edwards earned a promotion

After the close of the Overland Campaign, in July 1864, Edwards's brigade was reorganized and became the 3rd Brigade, 1st Division of the VI Corps. Three divisions of the VI Corps were then transferred to the command of Maj. Gen. Philip Sheridan in the Shenandoah Valley and took part in the Valley Campaigns of the summer and fall of 1864.

The turning point in this campaign for the Union Army came during the Battle of Opequon at Winchester, Virginia on September 19, 1864. During this engagement, Edwards was temporarily promoted to the command of the 1st Division of the VI Corps and performed well, earning the attention of Maj. Gen. Sheridan. Subsequently, Sheridan appointed Edwards the commandant of Winchester. On December 12, 1864, President Abraham Lincoln nominated Edwards for the award of the honorary grade of brevet brigadier general, United States Volunteers, to rank from October 19, 1864, for gallantry at the Battle of Spotsylvania and at the Battle of Opequon (Third Winchester). The U.S. Senate confirmed the award on February 14, 1865. When Sheridan embarked on his southward offensive through the Shenandoah Valley in October 1864, he asked Edwards to become his provost marshal general. However, Edwards preferred to retain command of his brigade and to return to the Army of the Potomac.

Edwards and his brigade returned to the Army of the Potomac in the midst of the long Siege of Petersburg. During the Third Battle of Petersburg on April 2, 1865, Edwards's brigade was the first Union unit to break through the Confederate works outside Petersburg. After the Confederates had evacuated their fortifications, Edwards personally received the surrender of the city from the mayor of Petersburg.

On May 19, 1865, President Andrew Johnson nominated Edwards to the full grade of brigadier general, United States Volunteers, to rank from May 19, 1865. However, the President did not present the nomination of Edwards for the promotion to the U. S. Senate until January 13, 1866. Although Edwards had been mustered out of the U.S. Volunteers on January 15, 1866, the Senate confirmed the promotion on February 23, 1866. On July 9, 1866, President Andrew Johnson nominated Edwards for the award of the honorary grade of brevet major general, United States Volunteers, to rank from April 5, 1865, for capturing Confederate Lieutenant General Richard S. Ewell, Major General Custis Lee, (son of Robert E. Lee), who was captured by David Dunnels White of the 37th Massachusetts Regiment, which was part of Oliver Edwards' command, and an entire brigade of Confederate soldiers at the Battle of Sayler's Creek, Virginia during the Appomattox Campaign. The U.S. Senate confirmed the award on July 23, 1866.

After the close of the war, Edwards continued his service in the army for the remainder of 1865 and was offered a permanent position in the Regular Army. He declined, however, resigned his commission on January 15, 1866, and was mustered out that day.

== Post-war career ==
After the war, Edwards returned to Warsaw, Illinois and his wife, Ann Eliza Johnston Edwards, whom he had married in September 1863 when on leave from the army. They had two children, John E. Edwards and Julia Katherine Edwards. He spent three years as postmaster in Warsaw and then returned to Massachusetts to continue his career in manufacturing.

In 1870, Edwards was hired by the Florence Machine Company in Northampton, Massachusetts and eventually became general superintendent of the company. During this time, Edwards patented a number of inventions, including the Florence ice skate and the Florence oil stove. He resigned his position with the Florence Machine Company in 1875 and returned to Warsaw, where he went into early retirement for several years. His plans changed, however, when he was offered the position of general manager of the Gardner Machine and Gun Company in England in 1882. The company manufactured Gardner guns, which had been invented in the United States but the rights to which were purchased by the British Army. Edwards managed the company for a few years; however, poor health required him to resign and return to Warsaw and retirement.

His remaining years were spent pursuing leisure interests and also supporting various organizations such as the Grand Army of the Republic. Edwards died in Warsaw on April 28, 1904.

== See also ==
- List of American Civil War Generals (Union)
- List of Massachusetts generals in the American Civil War
- Massachusetts in the American Civil War
