= Arlington House, The Robert E. Lee Memorial =

Historic estate in Virginia, US

- Arlington House
- U.S. National Register of Historic Places
- U.S. National Memorial
- Virginia Landmarks Register
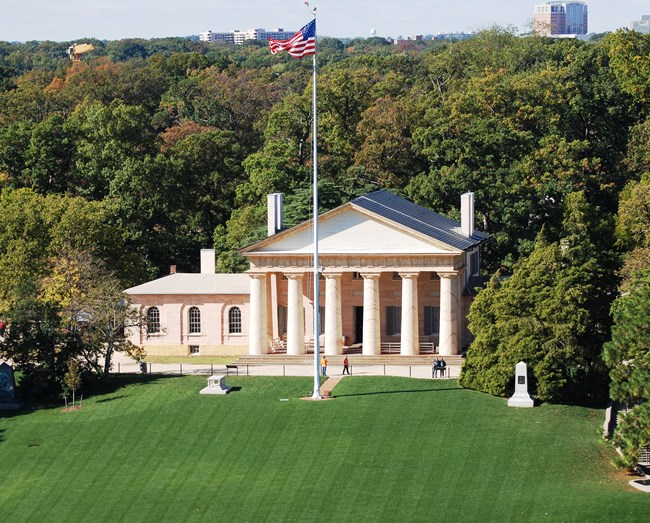
- Arlington House at Arlington National Cemetery

- Location within Virginia Location within Washington, D.C. Location within the United States
- Location: Arlington County, Virginia, U.S.
- Coordinates: 38°52′56″N 77°04′25″W
- Area: 28.08 acres (11.36 ha)
- Built: 1803–1818
- Architect: George Hadfield
- Architectural style: Greek Revival
- Visitation: 363,284 (2025)
- Website: Arlington House, The Robert E. Lee Memorial
- NRHP reference No.: 66000040
- VLR No.: 000-0001

Significant dates
- Added to NRHP: October 15, 1966
- Boundary increase: March 17, 2014
- Designated VLR: July 6, 1971

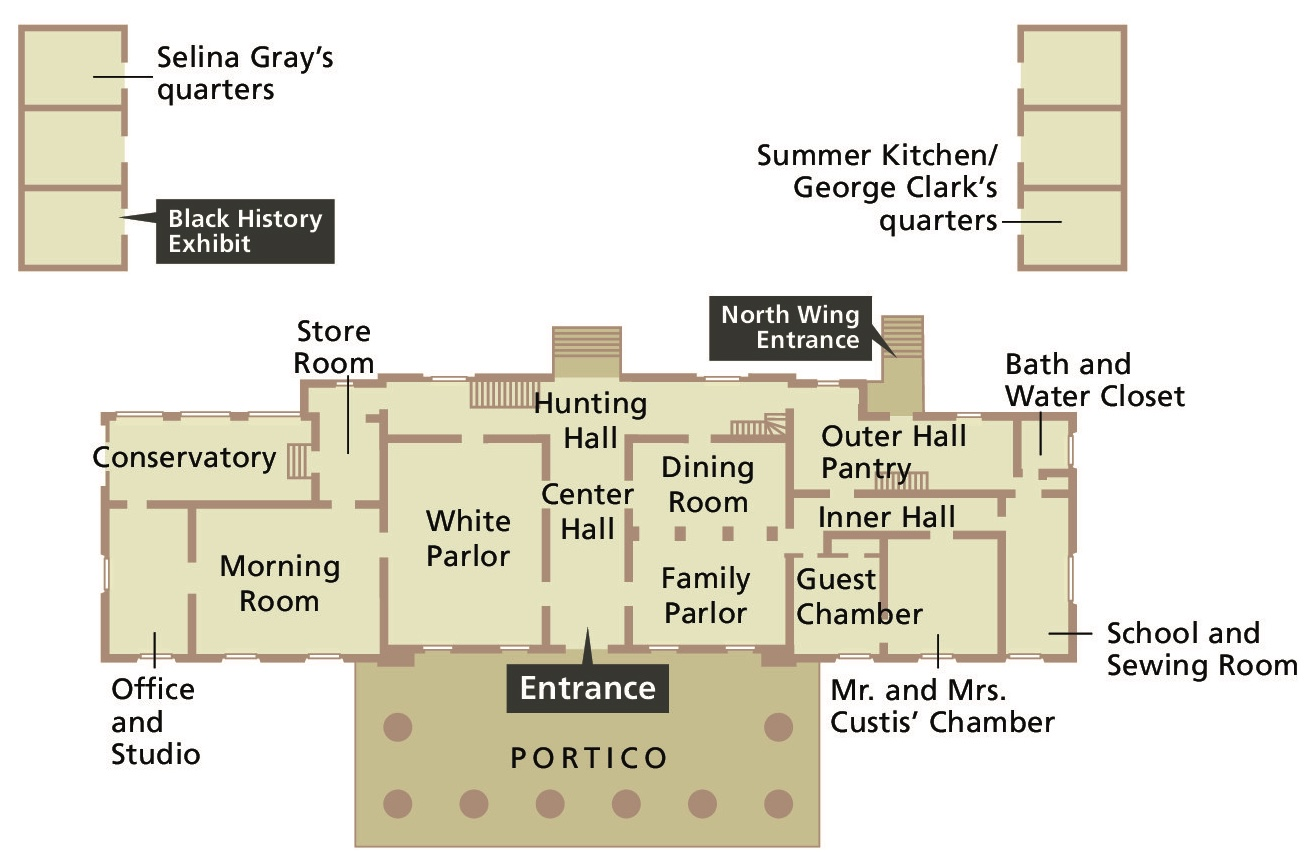
First Floor Plan

Arlington House is the historic Custis family mansion built by George Washington Parke Custis from 1803 to 1818 as a memorial to George Washington. Currently maintained by the National Park Service, it is located in the U.S. Army's Arlington National Cemetery in Arlington County, Virginia (formerly Alexandria, D.C.). Arlington House is a Greek Revival style mansion designed by the English architect George Hadfield. The Custis grave sites, garden and slave quarters are also preserved on the former Arlington estate.

George Washington Parke Custis lived at Arlington House with his wife Mary Fitzhugh Custis and their daughter, Mary Anna Randolph Custis. Custis built Arlington House as a memorial to his namesake, George Washington, husband of his grandmother, Martha Dandridge Custis Washington. Custis inherited the land from his father, John Parke Custis, who died at the end of the American Revolution during the siege of Yorktown. Martha Washington's children and two of her grandchildren were raised at Mount Vernon, the nearby Washington family estate in Virginia. George Washington Parke Custis served in the U.S. Army in the War of 1812 and helped prevent the famous painting of George Washington from falling into the hands of the British.

His daughter, painter Mary Anna Randolph Custis married her childhood friend and distant cousin, then-U.S. Army Lieutenant Robert E. Lee, and all but one of their children were born there. They all lived at Arlington House together as Lee traveled as a soldier in the U.S. Army. It was there that Lee decided to resign from the U.S. Army after having been offered command of it, to eventually lead the Army of Northern Virginia in the Confederate States Army during the U.S. Civil War.

The U.S. Army of the Potomac used the mansion for a headquarters and buried Civil War soldiers in the garden by the mansion. In a gesture of unity after the war, 2,111 unknown Civil War soldiers from both sides and several battles were buried together in a vault located near the mansion.

The government had confiscated Arlington Estate claiming that its rightful owner, Mary Anna Randolph Custis Lee, did not pay her property taxes on time in person (she had sent an agent to pay, who was refused). As per the Custis will, Arlington would later go to her son George Custis Lee. After the War, the property was returned to the Lee family, after a Supreme Court decision determined that the Federal Government had unlawfully refused payment, invalidating the subsequent confiscation. Custis Lee sold the property back to the U.S. with the graves undisturbed.

Arlington House is part of the "Arlington National Cemetery Historical Region" on the National Register of Historic Places. The U.S. flag flies at half-staff there whenever funerals are in progress.

== Construction and early history ==
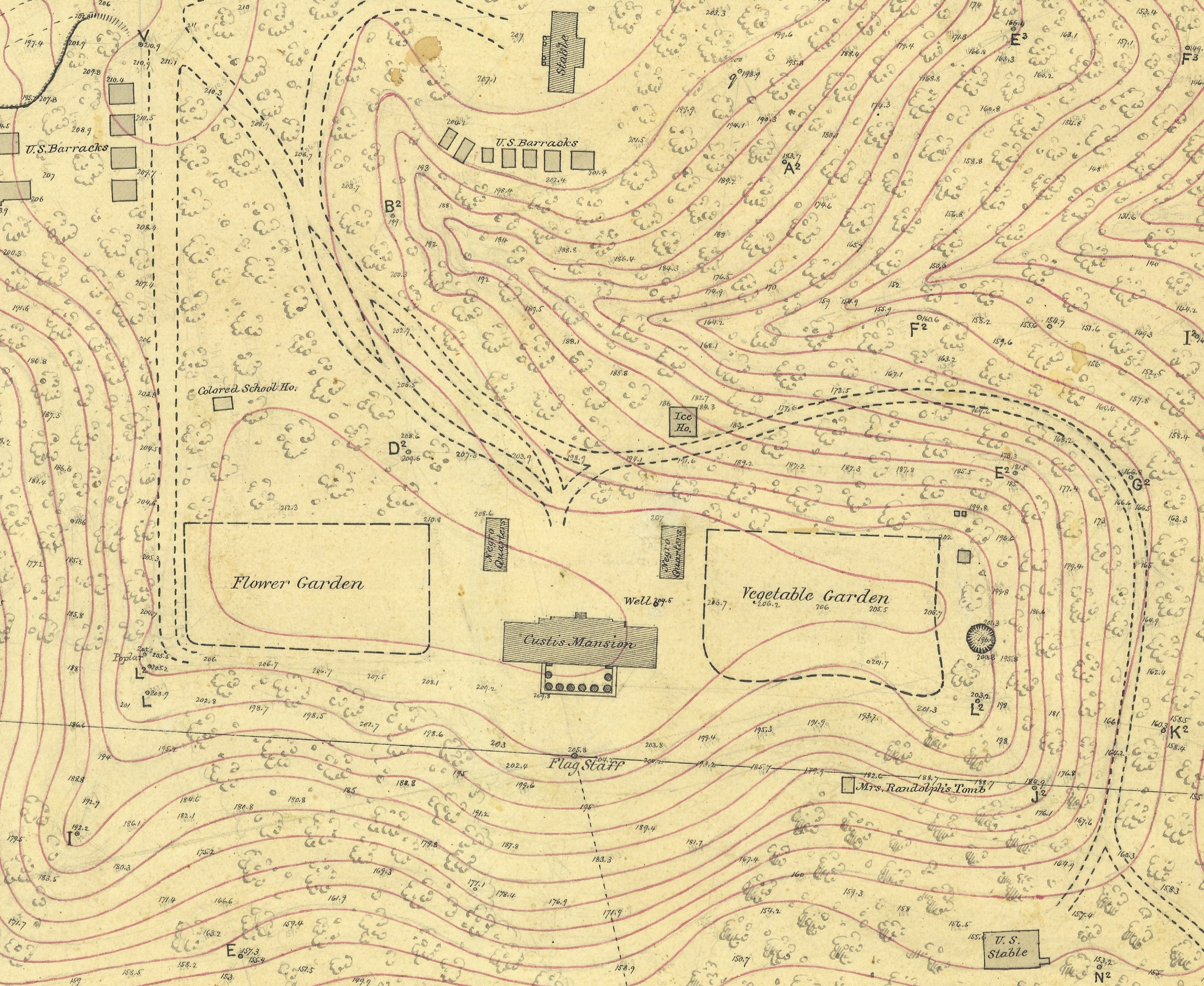
Map of Custis Mansion and its surrounding gardens in 1864

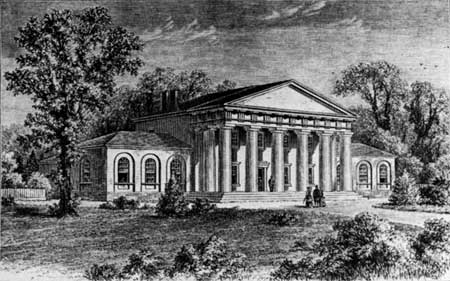
A pre-1861 sketch of Arlington House, published in 1875

The mansion was built on the orders of George Washington Parke Custis. He was the grandson of Martha Dandridge Custis Washington and Daniel Parke Custis, and the son of Eleanor Calvert Custis and John Parke Custis who was the stepson of George Washington. George W. P. Custis and his sister (Nelly) Eleanor Parke Custis were stepchildren and wards of Dr. David Stuart (their mother Eleanor's second husband). Martha's children and grandchildren were raised by the Washingtons at Mount Vernon. Custis became a prominent resident of an area that was then known as Alexandria County, at the time part of the District of Columbia prior to the District of Columbia retrocession.

Arlington House was built at a high point on a 1,100-acre (445 ha) estate that Custis's father, John Parke Custis, had purchased in 1778 and named "Mount Washington". The estate lies on the Potomac River. "Jacky" Custis died during the siege of Yorktown in 1781 after the British surrender. The younger Custis decided to build his home on the property in 1802 following the death of Martha Washington and three years after the death of George Washington. After acquiring the property, Custis renamed it "Arlington" after the Custis family's homestead on the Eastern Shore of Virginia.

Custis began constructing Arlington House on his land, hiring George Hadfield as architect, who constructed a mansion exhibiting the first example of Greek Revival architecture in America. Custis intended the mansion to serve as a living memorial to George Washington and a place for his collection of George Washington artifacts. Its design included elements similar to those of George Washington's plantation house at Mount Vernon.

Construction began in 1803, eleven years after L'Enfant's Plan for the future federal city later called "Washington City" and then Washington, D.C., had designated an area directly across the Potomac River to be the site of the "President's House", later called the "Executive Mansion" and now the White House, and the "Congress House", now the United States Capitol. Custis located the building on a prominent hill overlooking Georgetown-Alexandria Turnpike at the approximate location of the present Eisenhower Drive in Arlington National Cemetery, the Potomac River and growing national capital of Washington, D.C., on the opposite side of the river. The mansion was built using materials on site, though the building was interrupted by the War of 1812, and material shortages after the British burned the American capital city. The Custis mansion's exterior was completed in 1818.

Pierre Charles L'Enfant was an engineer, architect and city planner who served in the Continental Army during the American Revolution. L'Enfant designed the layout of Washington City (now D.C.). He is buried in front of the mansion in section 2, grave S-3 overlooking the city he planned.

The north and south wings were completed in 1804. The large center section and the portico, presenting an imposing front 140 ft (43 m) long, were finished 13 years later. The house has two kitchens, a summer and a winter. The most prominent features of the house are the 8 massive columns of the portico, each 5 feet (1.5 m) in diameter.

Notable guests at the house included Marquis de Lafayette, who visited in 1824. At Arlington, Custis experimented with new methods of animal husbandry and other agriculture. The property also included Arlington Spring, a picnic ground on the banks of the Potomac that Custis originally built for private use but later opened to the public, eventually operating it as a commercial enterprise.

Custis married Mary Lee Fitzhugh. Their only child to survive to adulthood was Mary Anna Randolph Custis. Robert E. Lee, whose mother was a cousin of Mrs. Custis, frequently visited Arlington and knew Mary Anna as they grew up. Two years after graduating from West Point, Lieutenant Lee married Mary Anna Custis at Arlington on June 30, 1831. For 30 years, Arlington House was home to the Lees. They spent much of their married life traveling between United States Army duty stations and Arlington, where six of their seven children were born. They shared this home with Mary's parents. After their deaths, Mary's parents were buried not far from the house on land that is now part of Arlington National Cemetery.

The Custis family extensively developed the Arlington estate. Much of the steep slope to the east of the house became a cultivated English landscape park, while a large flower garden with an arbor was constructed and planted south of the house. To the west of Arlington House, tall grass and low native plants led down a slope into a natural area of close-growing trees the Custises called "the Grove". About 60 feet (18 m) west of the flower garden, "the Grove" contained tall elm and oak trees which formed a canopy. An informal flower garden was planted beneath the trees and maintained by the Custis daughters before 1853.

Upon George Washington Parke Custis's death in 1857, he left Arlington Estate to Mary Anna Randolph Custis Lee for her lifetime when it would then go to her eldest son, George Washington Custis Lee. The estate needed much repair and reorganization, and Robert E. Lee, as executor of Custis's will, took a three-year leave of absence from the Army to begin the necessary agricultural and financial improvements.

== Civil War ==
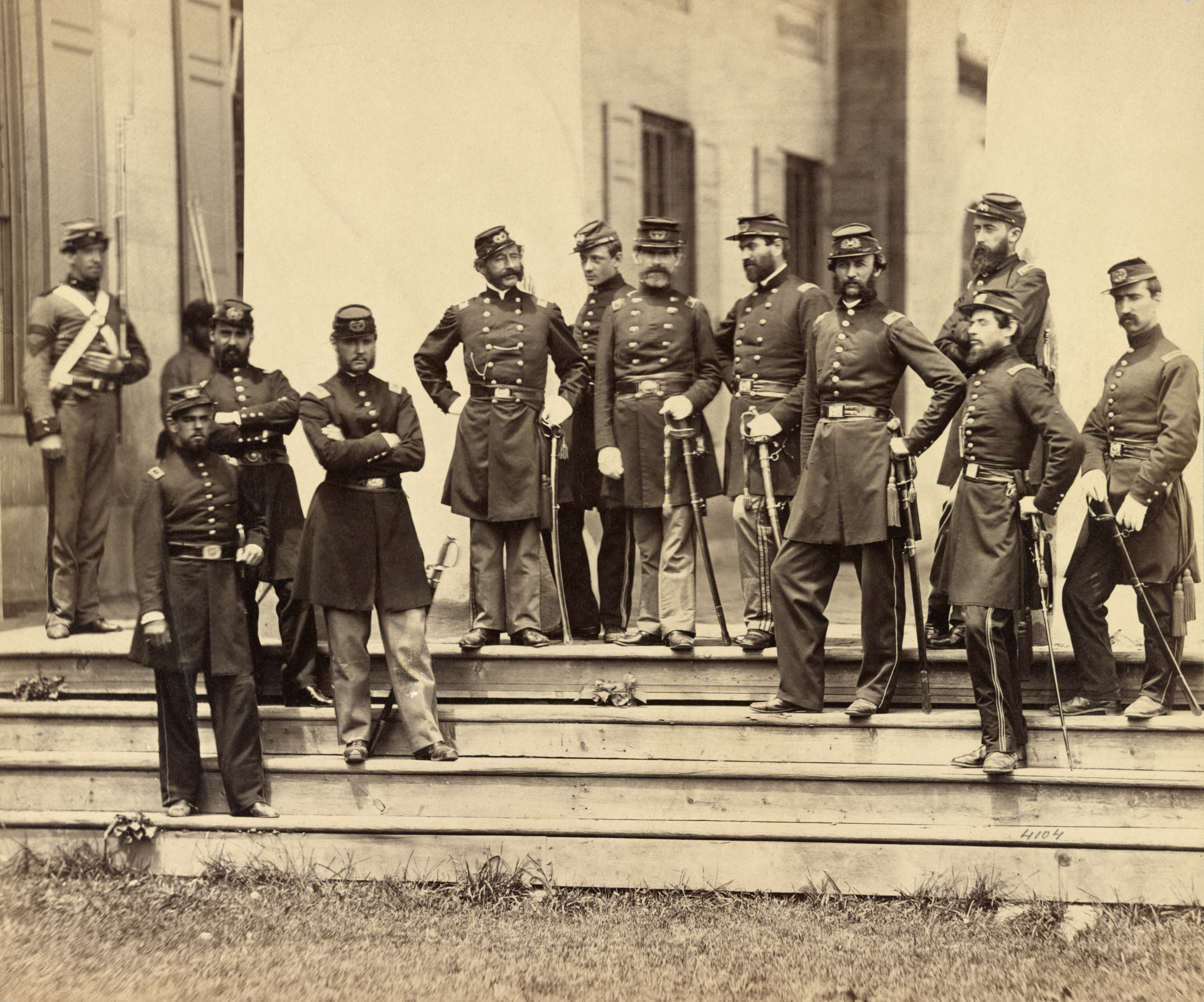
Officers of the 8th New York Infantry Regiment at Arlington House in June 1861

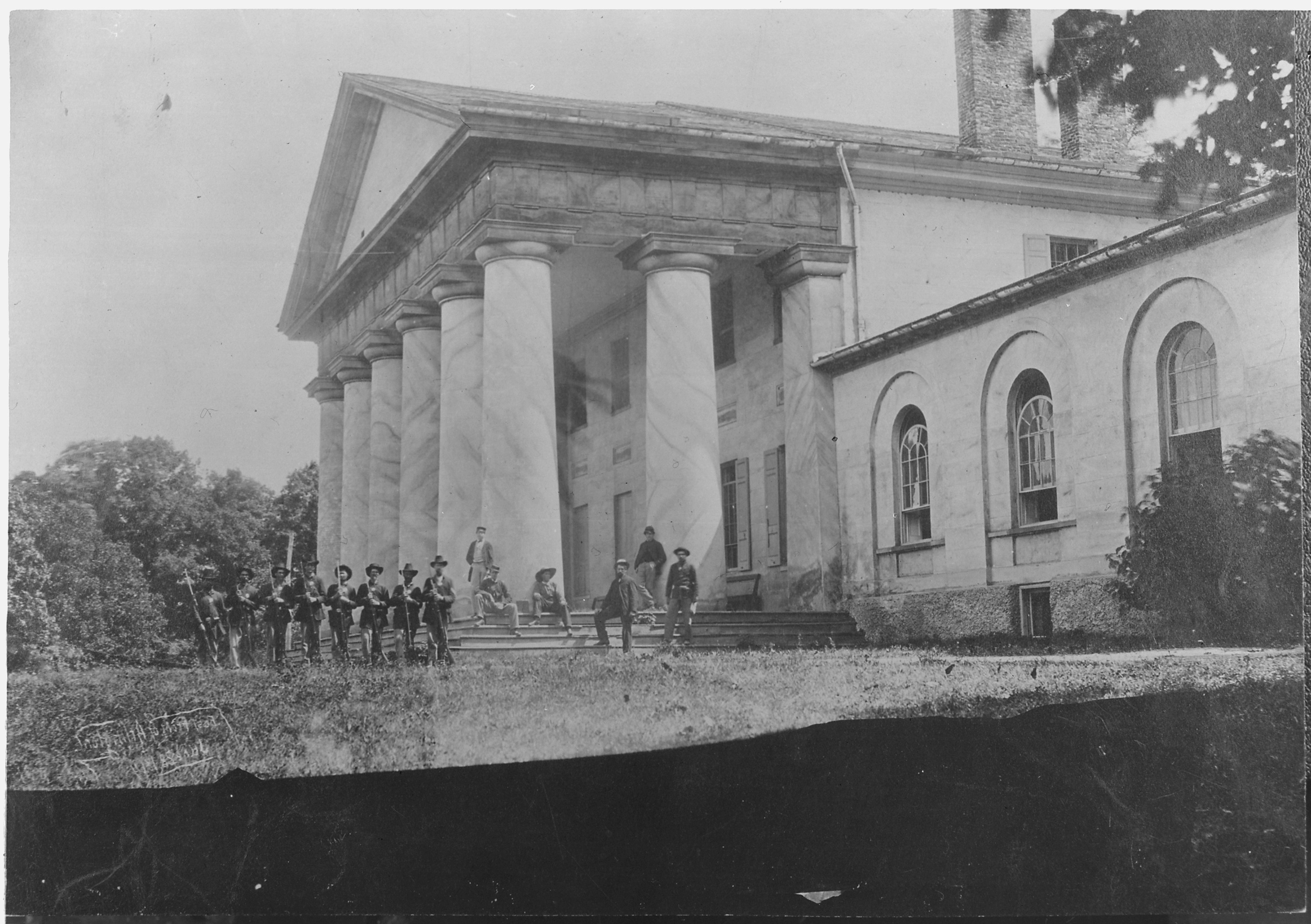
East front of Arlington House with Union Army soldiers on the lawn on June 28, 1864

In April 1861, Virginia seceded from the United States. It was at Arlington House that Lee decided to resign from the U.S. Army to eventually lead the Army of Northern Virginia in the Confederate States Army. Though offered command of the U.S. Army, Robert E. Lee resigned his commission on April 20, 1861 and joined the Confederate States Army. With Arlington House on high ground overlooking the capital, the federal government of the United States knew it needed to occupy the mansion or be left in an untenable military position. Although unwilling to leave Arlington House, Mary Custis Lee believed her estate would soon be occupied by Union Army soldiers and left to stay with relatives on May 14, after being warned by her young cousin William Orton Williams, who was then serving as aide to General Winfield Scott. On May 24, 1861, Union Army troops seized and occupied Arlington without opposition.

In June 1862, the 37th United States Congress enacted legislation that imposed a property tax on all land in "insurrectionary" areas of the United States. The 1863 amendments to the statute required that these taxes be paid in person. Mary Lee, afflicted with severe rheumatoid arthritis and behind Confederate lines, could not pay the tax in person, resulting in the Arlington estate being seized for nonpayment of taxes. It was auctioned off on January 11, 1864, and the U.S. government acquired the property for $26,800 ($563,674 today).

During the Civil War, Union Army troops cut down many of the trees on the Arlington estate, especially those to the north and east of Arlington House in and near Fort Whipple, which was north of the house and Arlington Springs near the Potomac River. However, a number of large trees remained, particularly those in a forested area now known as Arlington Woods, located west of the house.

By early 1864, the military cemeteries of Washington, D.C., and Alexandria, Virginia, were rapidly filling with war dead. Quartermaster General of the U.S. Army Montgomery C. Meigs proposed using 200 acres (81 ha) of the Arlington Estate as a cemetery. United States Secretary of War Edwin M. Stanton approved the establishment of a military cemetery on June 15, 1864 and created Arlington National Cemetery. Meigs decided that a large number of burials should occur close to Arlington House to render it unlivable. Officers were to be buried next to the main flower garden south of the house, and the first burial occurred here on May 17. Meigs ordered that additional burials commence immediately on the grounds of Arlington House in mid-June. When Union officers bivouacked in the mansion complained and had the burials temporarily stopped, Meigs countermanded their orders and had another 44 dead officers buried along the southern and eastern sides of the main flower garden within a month.

In September 1866, the remains of 2,111 Union and Confederate soldiers killed in the First Battle of Bull Run, Second Battle of Bull Run, and along the Rappahannock River were buried on the former site of the Grove, southeast of the mansion beneath the Civil War Unknowns Monument.

== Post-Civil War ==
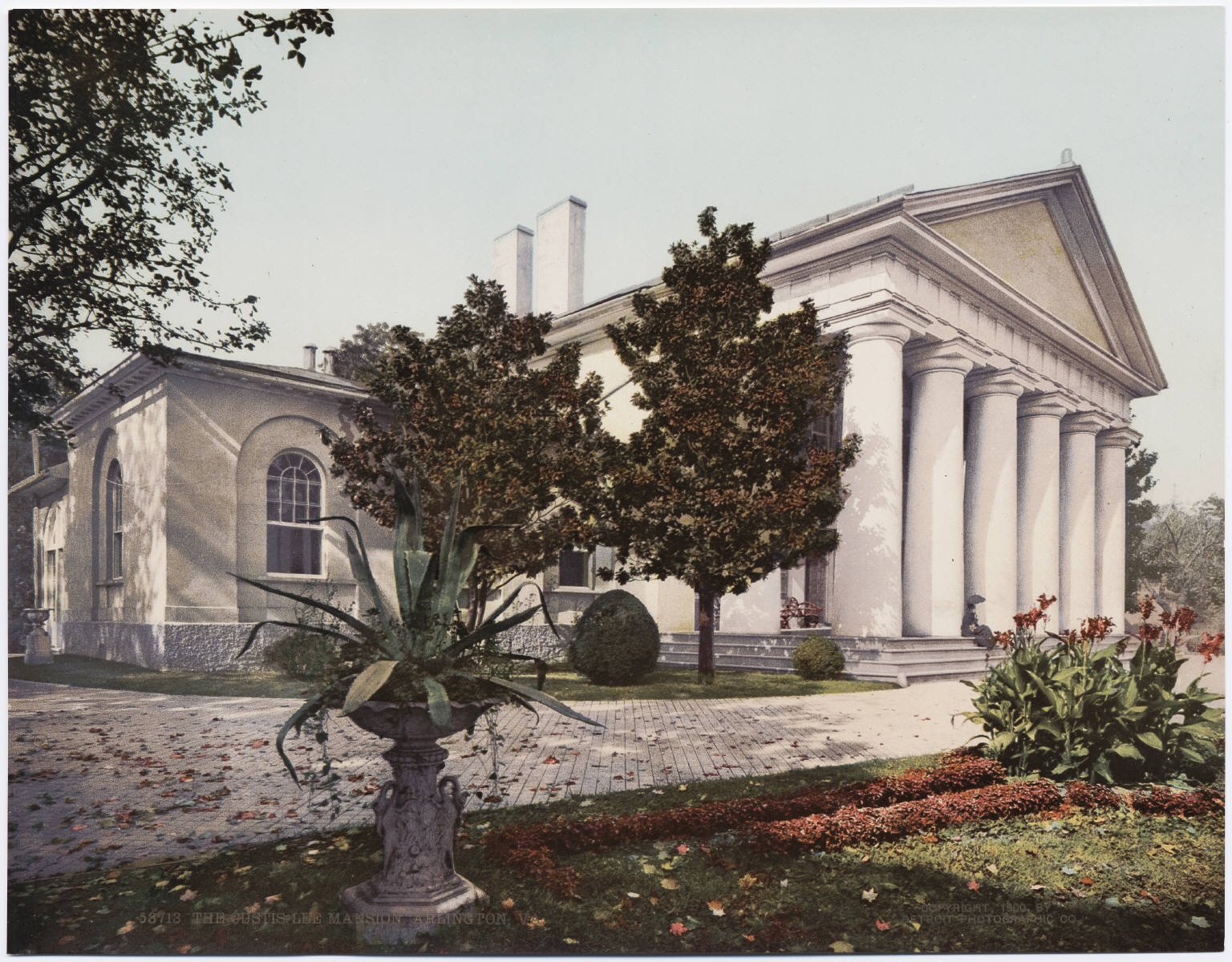
The east side of Arlington House depicted in a photochrom postcard, circa 1900

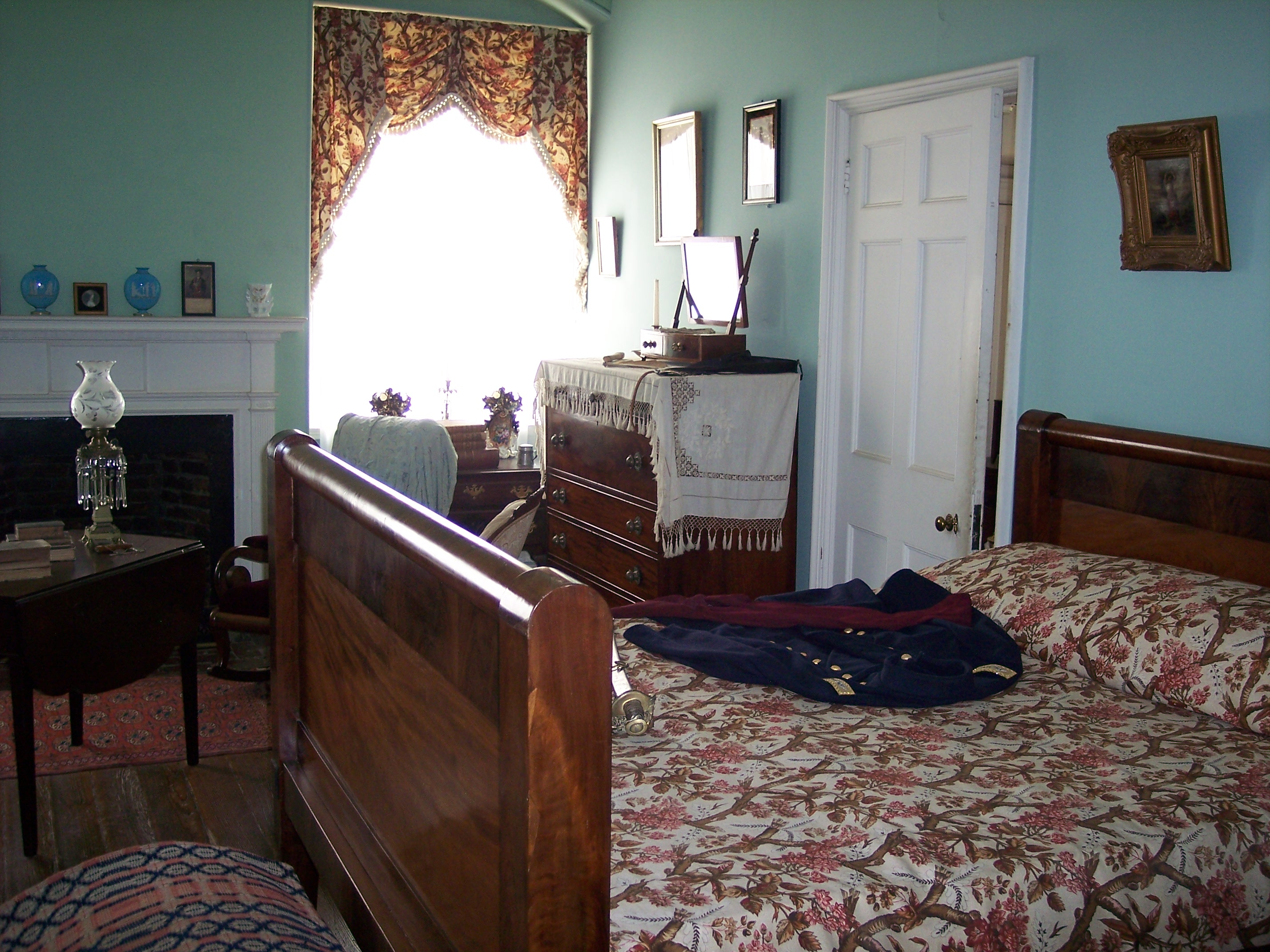
The restored second-floor chamber shared by Lee and his wife, featuring a replica pattern of a 1858 U.S. Army colonel of cavalry uniform across the bed in 2005

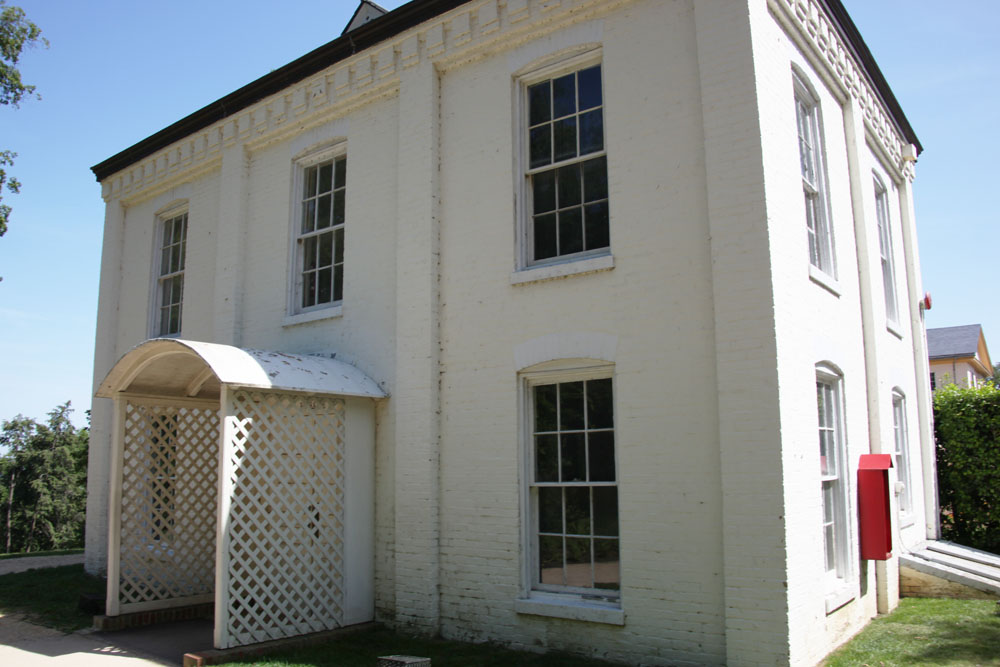
The potting shed near Arlington House converted to a museum in 2012

Robert E. Lee did not visit Arlington after the war. He died as president of Washington College in 1870. Mary Lee died in 1873, having visited the house only one more time, a few months before her death. Too upset at its condition, she refused to enter and left after just a few moments.

In April 1874, Robert E. Lee and Mary Custis Lee's eldest son, George Washington Custis Lee, filed suit against the United States government in a Virginia circuit court to regain the property. Custis Lee, who during the Civil War had fought against the United States as a Confederate major general, had been captured by Union forces at the Battle of Sailor's Creek on April 6, 1865 (see David Dunnels White). A jury found in favor of Custis Lee, leading to extensive appeals by both parties. In 1882, the Supreme Court of the United States ruled in favor of Lee in United States v. Lee, 106 U. S. 196. The court, by a 5–4 majority, found that the estate had been "illegally confiscated" in 1864 and ordered it returned. But Lee was less interested in obtaining the estate than he was a cash compensation for its value. After several months of difficult negotiations, Lee and the federal government settled on a sale price of $150,000 ($5,183,036 in 2025 dollars). Congress enacted legislation funding the purchase on March 3, 1883; Lee signed over the title on March 31; and the title transfer was recorded on May 14, 1883.

In 1920, the Virginia General Assembly changed the name of Alexandria County to Arlington County to end ongoing confusion between Alexandria County and the independent city of Alexandria. The name Arlington was chosen to reflect the presence of the Arlington House.

On March 4, 1925, the 68th United States Congress enacted Public Resolution 74, which authorized the restoration of the Lee Mansion in the Arlington National Cemetery, Virginia. The War Department then began to restore Arlington House, and the Department of the Army continues to manage over half of the original plantation's 1,100 acres (450 ha), as Arlington National Cemetery. However, for several years after Congress enacted the authorizing legislation, the War Department, which was responsible for managing the house and grounds, largely ignored the legislation. Contradicting the authorizing legislation, the department, largely at the insistence of Charles Moore, the director of the United States Commission of Fine Arts, furnished and interpreted the Mansion to "the first half of the republic." This decision was based, in part, on the popularity of the Colonial Revival movement which was still popular in 1925. The Mansion was restored to the period of George Washington Parke Custis, and no furniture manufactured after 1830 was accepted. This approach negated Lee's role and presence at Arlington.

In 1955, the 84th United States Congress enacted Public Law 84–107, a joint resolution that designated the manor as the "Custis-Lee Mansion" as a permanent memorial to Robert E. Lee. The resolution directed the United States Secretary of the Interior to erect on the premises a memorial plaque and to correct governmental records to bring them into compliance with the designation, "thus ensuring that the correct interpretation of its history would be applied". Gradually the house was furnished and interpreted to the period of Robert E. Lee as specified in the original legislation. The National Park Service received jurisdiction over the building and some 28 acres (11 ha) of adjacent gardens (distinguished from the cemetery) beginning June 10, 1933. In 1972, the 92nd United States Congress enacted Public Law 92-333, an Act that amended Public Law 84–107 to designate the manor as "Arlington House, The Robert E. Lee Memorial".

In 2020, members of Congress began to introduce bills to change the name again, to "The Arlington House National Historic Site". By 2022 they won the support of a variety of descendants of former residents, including the Lees.

== Gray family ==
One of the lesser-known histories about Arlington House concerns the Gray family, who helped to preserve the legacy of George Washington Parke Custis as well as the Lee family. Selina Norris Gray, the daughter of Leonard and Sally Norris, was a second-generation Arlington slave. In 1831, Selina married Thornton Gray, a fellow enslaved person at Arlington, and eventually had eight children who grew up at Arlington. With the onset of the Civil War, the Lee family had to evacuate their home before the Union troops came and occupied the property. Even though Selina was a personal maid to Mrs. Lee, she and her family were left behind; however, before leaving, Mrs. Lee left the house keys to Selina and the responsibility to protect the treasures of the home. Several of these treasures included cherished family heirlooms that had once belonged to Mrs. Lee's great-grandmother, Martha Custis Washington, and President George Washington.

Within months of Union Army General Irvin McDowell occupying the home in 1861, Selina realized that several precious heirlooms were missing due to soldiers looting the property. When she discovered that some of the Washington relics had also disappeared, she promptly provided a list of the missing objects to General McDowell and convinced him that the significance of the collection required his involvement. He first secured the attic and basement areas to prevent further theft, then had the remaining Lee heirlooms shipped to the Patent Office in Washington, D.C., for safekeeping. While Selina is credited with saving the heirlooms and treasures of Arlington House, her children later on are credited with helping to restore the home as well as provide accurate details about the layout of the home, personal stories of the Lee family, and help preservationists in the early twentieth century.

During major restorative efforts to Arlington House from 1929 to 1930, the Gray family made another important contribution to the history of Arlington County and the nation. Four of Selina and Thornton's daughters provided crucial details about the house and its furnishings, and their input proved vital to the authenticity of the project. In 2014, the National Park Service acquired a rare photograph of Selina.

== Recent history ==
=== Arlington National Cemetery expansion ===
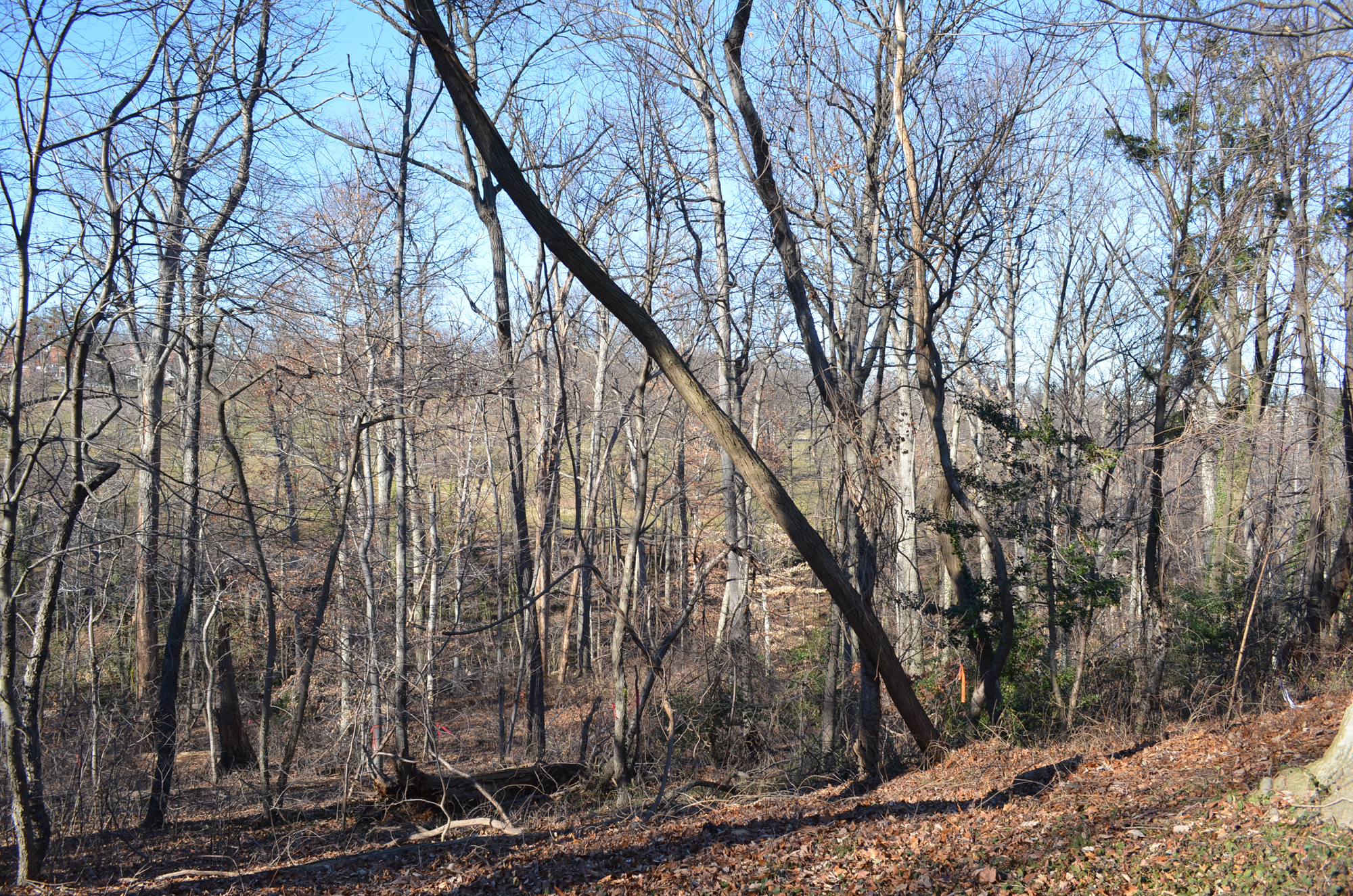
A portion of Arlington Woods on Humphreys Drive in 2013

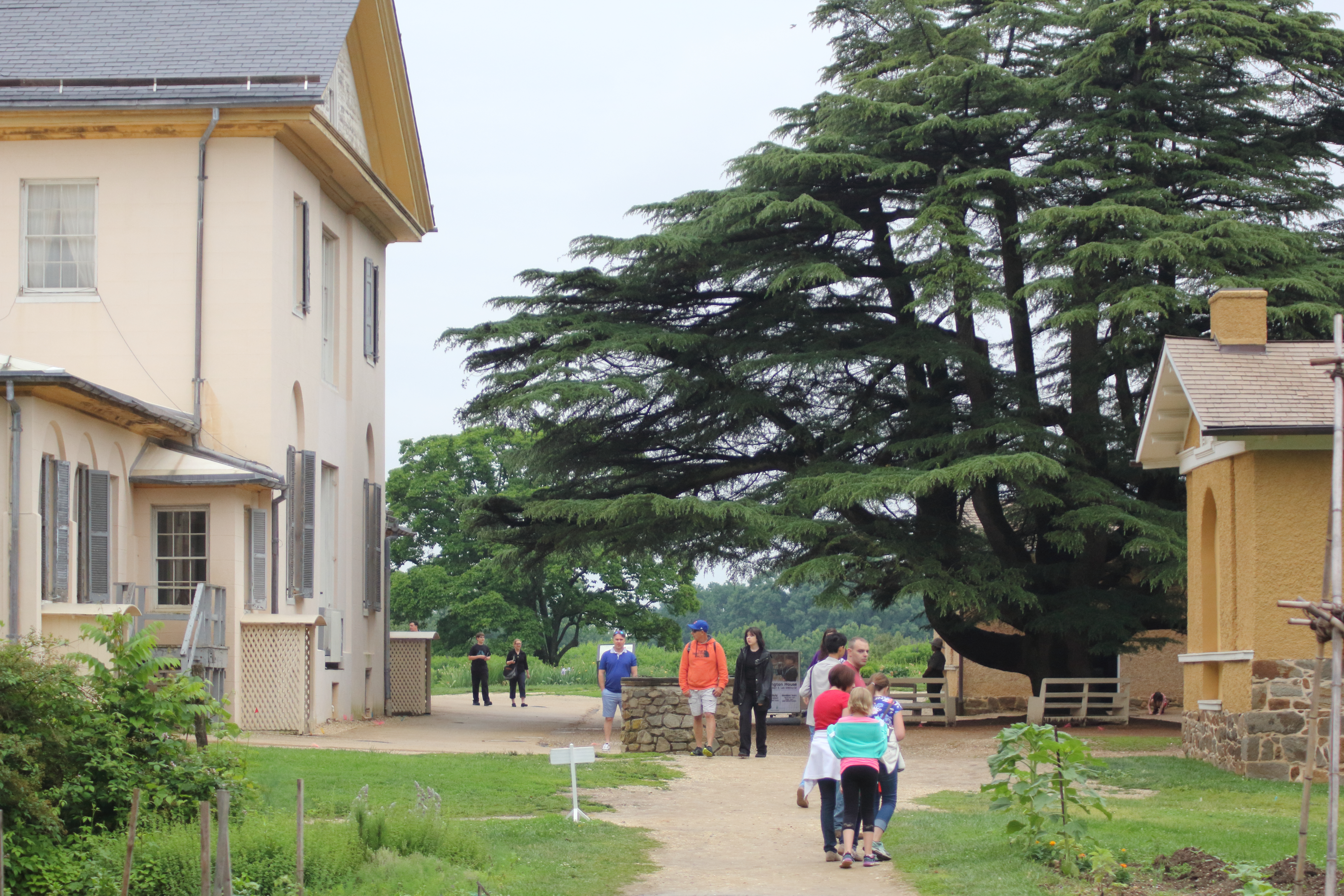
The back of Arlington House at Arlington National Cemetery on Memorial Day 2017

In 1995, officials of the United States Department of the Interior and the United States Department of the Army signed an agreement to transfer from Arlington House, The Robert E. Lee Memorial, to the Army a part of Arlington Woods, which was located in Section 29 of the NPS at Arlington National Cemetery between Arlington House and Fort Myer. The property transfer, which involved 12 acres (4.9 ha) of NPS land, was intended to enable the Cemetery to increase its space for burials.

Environmentalists expressed concerns that the agreement would result in the partial destruction of the 24 acres (9.7 ha) remnant of a historically important stand of native trees. Congress enacted legislation in September 1996 authorizing the transfer.

On June 5, 2013, after reviewing 100 public comments that it had received on a draft environmental assessment (EA) for the Cemetery expansion project, the United States Army Corps of Engineers released a final EA and a signed Finding of No Significant Impact (FONSI) for the project. The final EA stated that, of the 905 trees to be removed, 771 trees were healthy native trees that had diameters between 6 and 41 inches. The project would remove approximately 211 trees from a less than 2.63 acres (1.06 ha) area containing a portion of a 145-year-old forest that stood within the property boundaries of a historic district that a National Register of Historic Places nomination form for Arlington House had described in 1966. About 491 trees would be removed from an area of trees that was approximately 105 years old. At a public hearing on July 11, 2013, the National Capital Planning Commission approved the site and building plans for the project.

=== Studies, damages and restorations ===
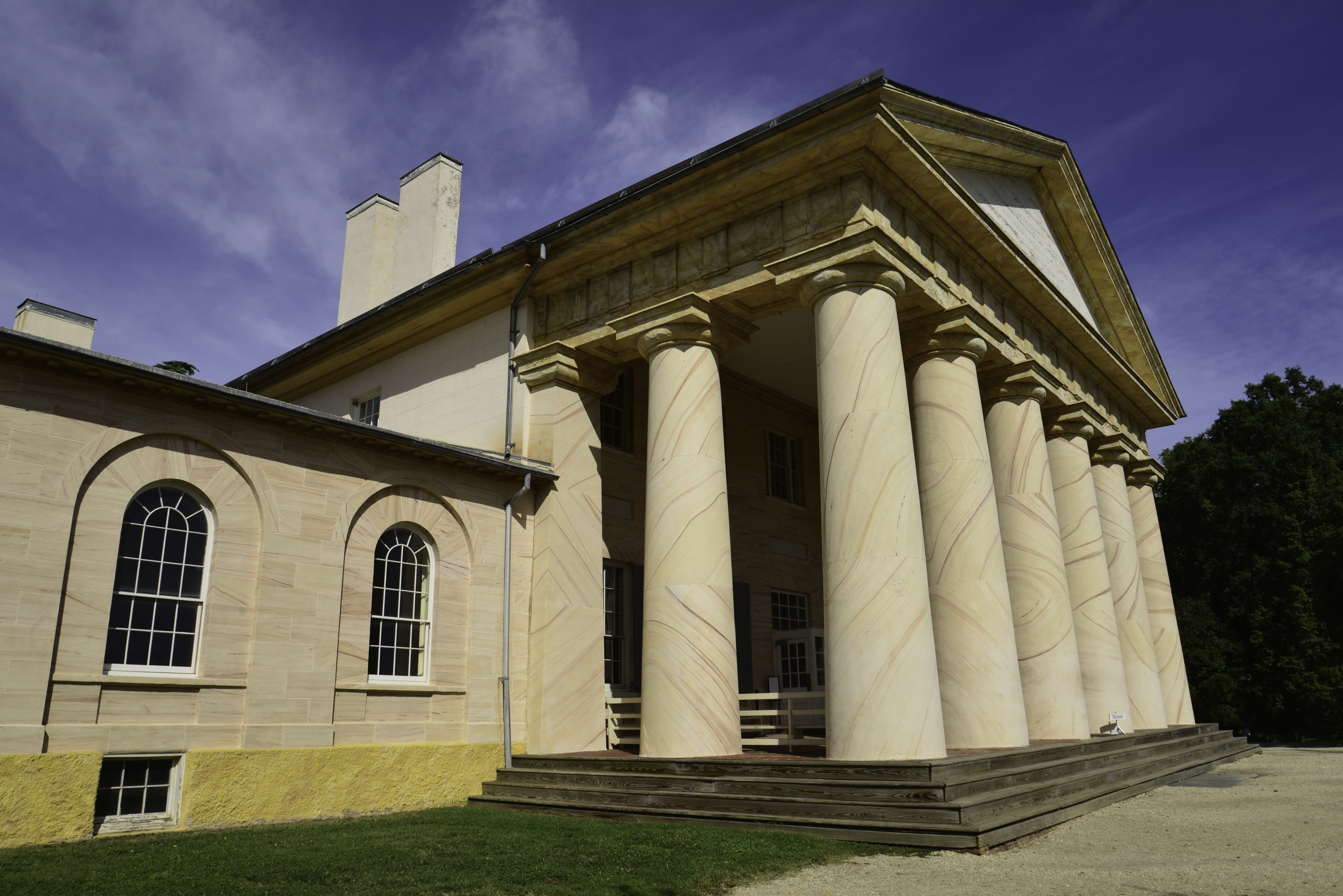
The east side of Arlington House in 2012

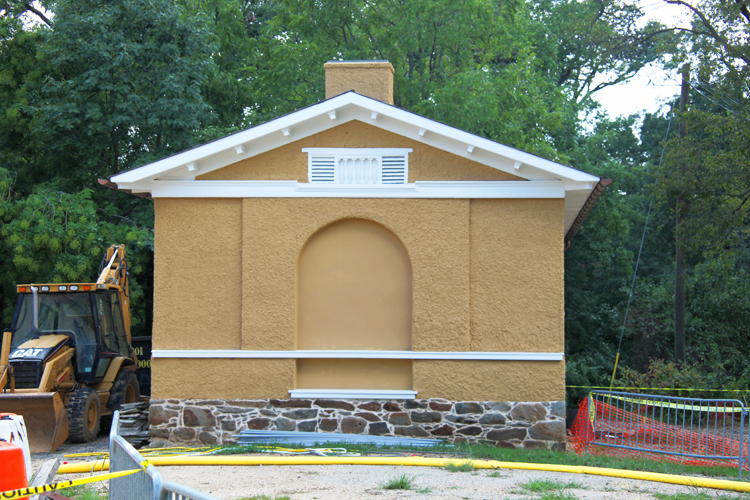
The east façade of Arlington House's north slave quarters during restoration in 2011

From 2003 to 2007, the National Park Service conducted an archeological excavation of two outbuildings that once held Arlington House's slave quarters. In 2009, the Park Service published reports that described the history of the slave quarters and the findings of the excavations, as well as proposals for the restoration of the quarters.

From 2007 through 2013, Arlington House underwent its first renovation since 1925. During that period, the National Park Services placed the House's furnishings on display at the Friendship Hill National Historic Site near Point Marion, Pennsylvania. The Park Service held a rededication ceremony after it had completed the renovation and returned the furnishings to the House.

Arlington House suffered significant damage in the 2011 Virginia earthquake, requiring the closure of the back halls and upper floor pending an architectural assessment. On July 17, 2014, philanthropist David Rubenstein donated $12.5 million (~$16.7 million in 2025) to the National Park Foundation (the arm of the National Park Service which raises funds through private contributions) to rehabilitate Arlington House, its outbuildings, and grounds. The 30-month project is intended to restore the mansion, buildings, and grounds to the way they looked in 1860. The project will repair the earthquake-damaged foundation, and add new interior lighting and a modern climate-control system. National Park Service officials said they are likely to close Arlington House and the slave quarters for several months in 2016, during which most of the work will be done.

== Replicas ==
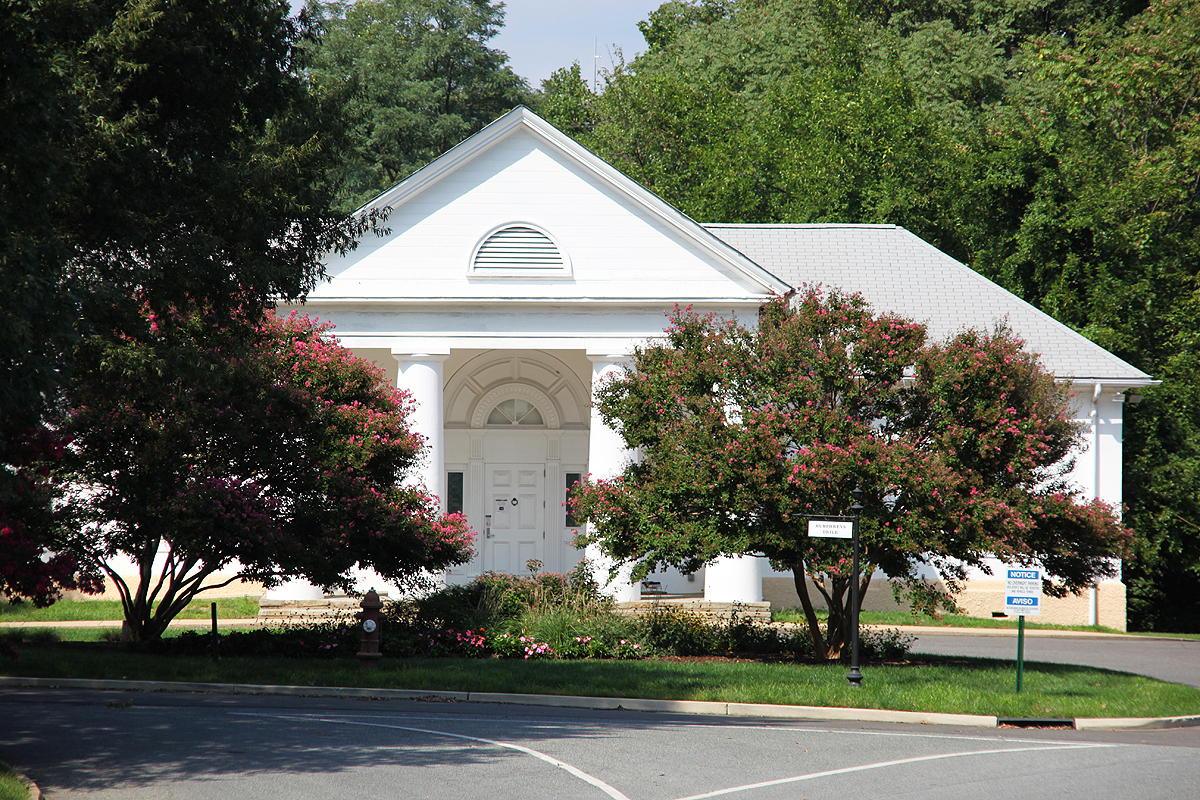
The Old Administration Building at Arlington National Cemetery in 2011

In 1919, a replica was built for the short-lived Lanier University in Atlanta, designed by architect A. Ten Eyck Brown. It is still standing at 1140 University Drive NE, and houses the Ben H. Zimmerman Religious School and the Canterbury School. Arlington Hall, a two-thirds scale replica of Arlington House, was built in 1939 in Robert E. Lee Park, now Turtle Creek Park, in Dallas, Texas.

The façade of the Old Administration Building in Arlington National Cemetery resembles that of Arlington House. The building is 500 feet (150 m) west of Arlington House.

== See also ==
- List of memorials to Robert E. Lee
- List of National Historic Landmarks in Virginia
- List of national memorials of the United States
- National Register of Historic Places listings in Arlington County, Virginia

== Bibliography ==
- Amar, Akhil Reed (June 1987). "Of Sovereignty and Federalism". Yale Law Journal. 96 (7): 1425–1520. doi:10.2307/796493. JSTOR 796493.
- Heidler, David Stephen; Heidler, Jeanne T.; Coles, David J., eds. (2000). "Arlington". Encyclopedia of the American Civil War: A Political, Social, and Military History, Volume 1. New York: W.W. Norton & Co. ISBN 9781576070666.
- Pencak, William, ed. (2009). "Arlington National Cemetery". Encyclopedia of the Veteran in America. Santa Barbara, Calif.: ABC-CLIO. ISBN 9780313340086.
- Atkinson, Rick (2007). Where Valor Rests: Arlington National Cemetery. Washington, D.C.: National Geographic Society. ISBN 9781426200892.
- Chase, Enoch Aquila (1930). "The Arlington Case: George Washington Custis Lee Against the United States of America". Records of the Columbia Historical Society: 207–233.
- Davis, Ren; Davis, Helen (2011). Atlanta Walks: A Comprehensive Guide to Walking, Running, and Bicycling the Area's Scenic and Historic Locales. Atlanta: Peachtree Publishers. ISBN 9781561455843.
- Fellman, Michael (2003). The Making of Robert E. Lee. Baltimore, Md.: Johns Hopkins University Press. ISBN 0679456503.
- Fernandez, Martin (2013). Best Bike Rides Washington, D.C.: Great Recreational Rides in the Metro Area. Guilford, Conn.: Globe Pequot Press. ISBN 9780762780815.
- Gerem, Yves (2004). A Marmac Guide to Dallas. Gretna, La.: Pelican Publishing Co. ISBN 1565544072.
- Grant, Eric (Fall 1996). "A Revolutionary View of the Seventh Amendment and the Just Compensation Clause". Northwestern University Law Review: 144–242.
- Hanna, Jennifer (October 2001). "Cultural Landscape Report: History: Volume 1" (PDF). Arlington House: The Robert E. Lee Memorial. Washington, D.C.: National Park Service: United States Department of the Interior. Archived from the original (PDF) on September 5, 2016.
- Holt, Dean W. (2010). American Military Cemeteries. Jefferson, N.C.: McFarland & Co. ISBN 9780786440238.
- McCaslin, Richard B. (2004). Lee in the Shadow of Washington. Baton Rouge, La.: Louisiana State University Press. ISBN 0807126969.
- Meyer, Randy L. (Fall 1998). "The Supreme Court's Analysis in Idaho v. Coeur D'Alene Tribe of Idaho: Is the Young Exception to the Eleventh Amendment Inapplicable to Indian Tribe Claims?". Toledo Law Review: 131–182.
- Peters, James Edward (1986). Arlington National Cemetery: Shrine to America's Heroes. Bethesda, Md.: Woodbine House. ISBN 1890627143.
- Perry, John (2010). Lee: A Life of Virtue. Baton Rouge: Louisiana State University Press.
- Poole, Robert M. (2009). On Hallowed Ground: The Story of Arlington National Cemetery. New York: Walker & Co. ISBN 9780802715487.
- Randall, J.G. (1913). The Confiscation of Property During the Civil War. Indianapolis: Mutual Printing and Lithographing Co. "The Confiscation of Property During the Civil War."
- Rudy, William George (2010). Interpreting America's First Grecian Style House: the Architectural Legacy of George Washington Parke Custis and George Hadfield. College Park, Maryland: University of Maryland. Archived from the original on March 7, 2016.
- United States Army Corps of Engineers, Norfolk District (March 2013). Arlington National Cemetery Millennium Project Environmental Assessment (PDF). Norfolk, Virginia. Archived from the original (PDF) on August 1, 2013.
- United States Department of the Interior (2003). The National Parks: Index 2001–2003. Washington, D.C.: U.S. Department of the Interior.
