= Marburg (Virginia) =

NRHP landmark in Virginia

- "Carillon Neighborhood Historic District" - Marburg
- U.S. National Register of Historic Places
- Virginia Landmarks Register
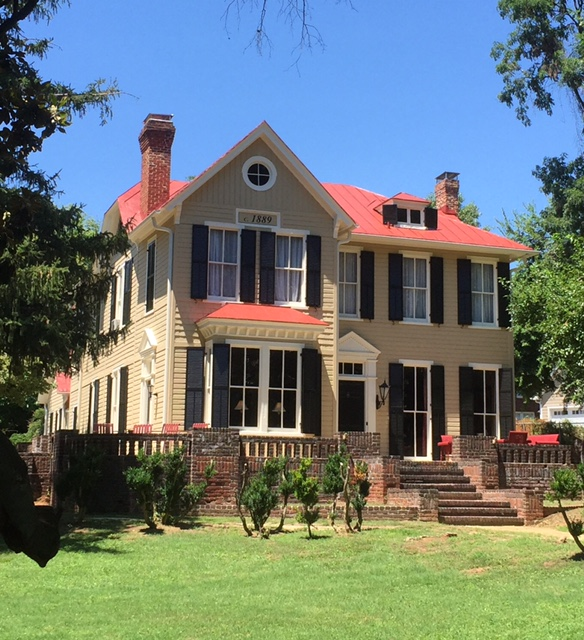
- Marburg, August 2015

- Location within Virginia
- Location: 3102 Bute Lane, Richmond, VA 23221
- Coordinates: 37°32′30″N 77°29′12″W
- Area: 0.355 acres (0.144 ha)
- Built: c. 1889
- NRHP reference No.: 15001045
- VLR No.: 127-6756

Significant dates
- Added to NRHP: February 2, 2016
- Designated VLR: December 10, 2015

Tenant Farmer Cottage 2015

Formal Parlor 2015

Marburg is a historic home located in the Carillon/Byrd Park area of Richmond, Virginia. It is the oldest standing residence in this area of Richmond, predating nearby Maymont by 4 years. The house was slated for demolition in 2013 to make way for 6 new homes but was saved by an ardent group of preservationists and the Historic Richmond Foundation. The redesigned development will now incorporate and encircle the existing house. An exterior restoration was completed in 2015 returning the house to its original colors after being stark white for many years. The barn red roof color was also restored. Two antebellum structures survive on this property: a 2-room servant cottage and a kitchen, both of which pre-date the house itself by over 30 years (see below). As of February 2021, the house and dependencies have been repainted white with green shutters and roof, retaining a classic feel amongst the newer homes built around it.

== History ==
Built in 1889 by Colonel Charles Euker, the house was named after his hometown of Marburg in Hessen, Germany. Euker was a courier for George Washington Custis Lee during the Civil War and later ran a successful saloon and billiard hall in Richmond. He was later Commandant of the Lee Confederate Soldier's Home, now the site of the Virginia Museum of Fine Arts. After Euker's ownership, it passed through a series of prominent Richmond families, largely as a summer residence. Alterations and improvements were made over the years, the last being renovations after a 1939 fire which necessitated new flooring and paneling on the first floor. New improvements and interior painting were started in January 2018.

== Architectural style ==
Features of Free Classic Queen Anne style architecture and Folk Victorian predominate the structure. Colonial Revival Style entry doors and surrounds were added in a 1939 renovation influenced by the recent Colonial Williamsburg restoration. Other interesting architectural elements abound including false windows, clipped gables, vertical beading, shingle tile siding, dentil mouldings, and functional exterior shutters. One standout feature is the striking Art Deco brick patio which wraps around the front of the home. It was added in the 1920s while the summer home of U.S. Tobacco Association President Tazewell M. Carrington.

== Tenant farmer cottage and kitchen ==
The land on which Marburg was built was previously part of a larger 90-acre farm called "Beechwood Farm" owned by wealthy merchant Bolling Haxall during the mid-19th century. Haxall did not reside at Beechwood Farm, but instead used it as a tenant farming operation for added income. Maps from the period show several farm structures in the general vicinity of these cottages but all were thought to have been lost over time. Dixon Kerr, a noted window restoration expert who rehabilitated the old windows, discovered they were single hung sashes with mortise and tenon joinery, both of which date to the antebellum period. Gordon Lohr, an architecture expert and past Revolving Fund Manager for the APVA, also reviewed the buildings and found nails, saw marks, hand-made bricks, and roof ridge boards indicative of the 1840s-1850s period. The 2-room cottage with central chimney was, in all likelihood, used for the tenant farmers and their families. The kitchen retains a massive brick fireplace (although the exiting chimney has clearly been replaced as it is not in scale with the fireplace. As the Marburg tract was the first parcel to be sold off from Beechwood Farm in 1888, it was likely chosen to include the cottage and kitchen to reduce building costs, as Euker was not especially wealthy.
