= Theodore Marburg Jr. =

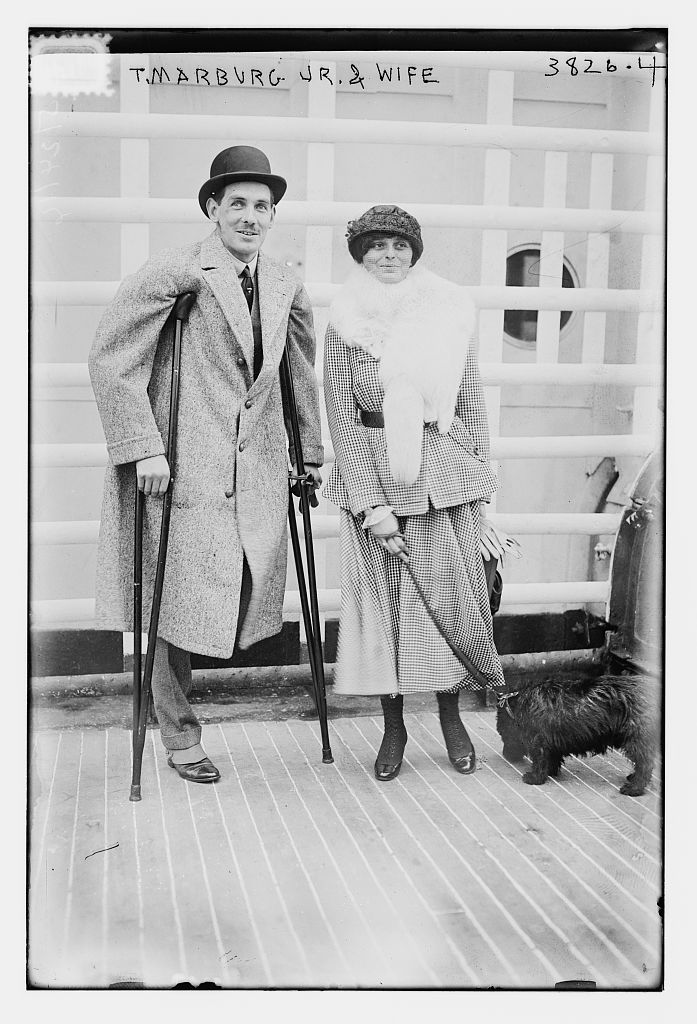
- Theodore Marburg Jr. in 1916
- Born: November 27, 1893; France
- Died: February 24, 1922 (aged 28); Mexico
- Spouse: Gesell de Vavario (m. 1916; div. 1921)
- Parent: Theodore Marburg

Captain Theodore Marburg Jr. (November 27, 1893 - February 24, 1922) was an American citizen who lost his U.S. citizenship when he became a member of the Royal Flying Corps. An act of Congress restored his citizenship, and other Americans who volunteered with allied forces.

== Biography ==
He was born on November 27, 1893, in France to Theodore Marburg, the United States Ambassador to Belgium from 1912 to 1914. He was educated at Oxford University. After graduation he joined the Royal Flying Corps in England. While on a mission to photograph the German lines in 1915, his plane crashed and a strut pierced his left knee, requiring the leg to be amputated. In 1917 he served as a wing examining officer at Canadian headquarters in Canada, and then he returned to England and flew at Shoreham in the south of England before becoming an instructor at Gosport.

In 1916 the United States Department of State refused to issue him a passport since according to the department taking the oath of allegiance to the British breaks allegiance to the United States. This case, which was widely publicized, led to a bill, signed in October 1917 by President Wilson, that restored US citizenship to US citizens who enlisted in Canadian, British, and French services before the US declaration of war if they took an oath of allegiance at a US consulate. An important reason Marburg wished to return to the US was to secure an American made artificial leg, and when he returned to the US he was treated at the Johns Hopkins Hospital. After the war, Marburg moved to the American Southwest where he purchased a cattle ranch, believing an outdoor life would be good for his health.

He married Baroness Gesell de Vavario of Belgium in Southampton, England, in April 1916. Unhappy with ranch life, she abandoned him and they divorced on August 15, 1921, in Santa Cruz County, Arizona. On January 3, 1922, he married Harriet de Forest Brown, the daughter of George Brown. After Marburg's death, Harriet would marry John Wentworth, son of Moses J. Wentworth.

He shot himself in the head on February 17, 1922, in Mexico. The shot to the head did not kill him immediately, he was brought to a hospital but died on February 24, 1922. He was buried in Druid Ridge Cemetery in Pikesville, Maryland.
