= Theodore Marburg =

American jurist and diplomat

Theodore Marburg Sr.
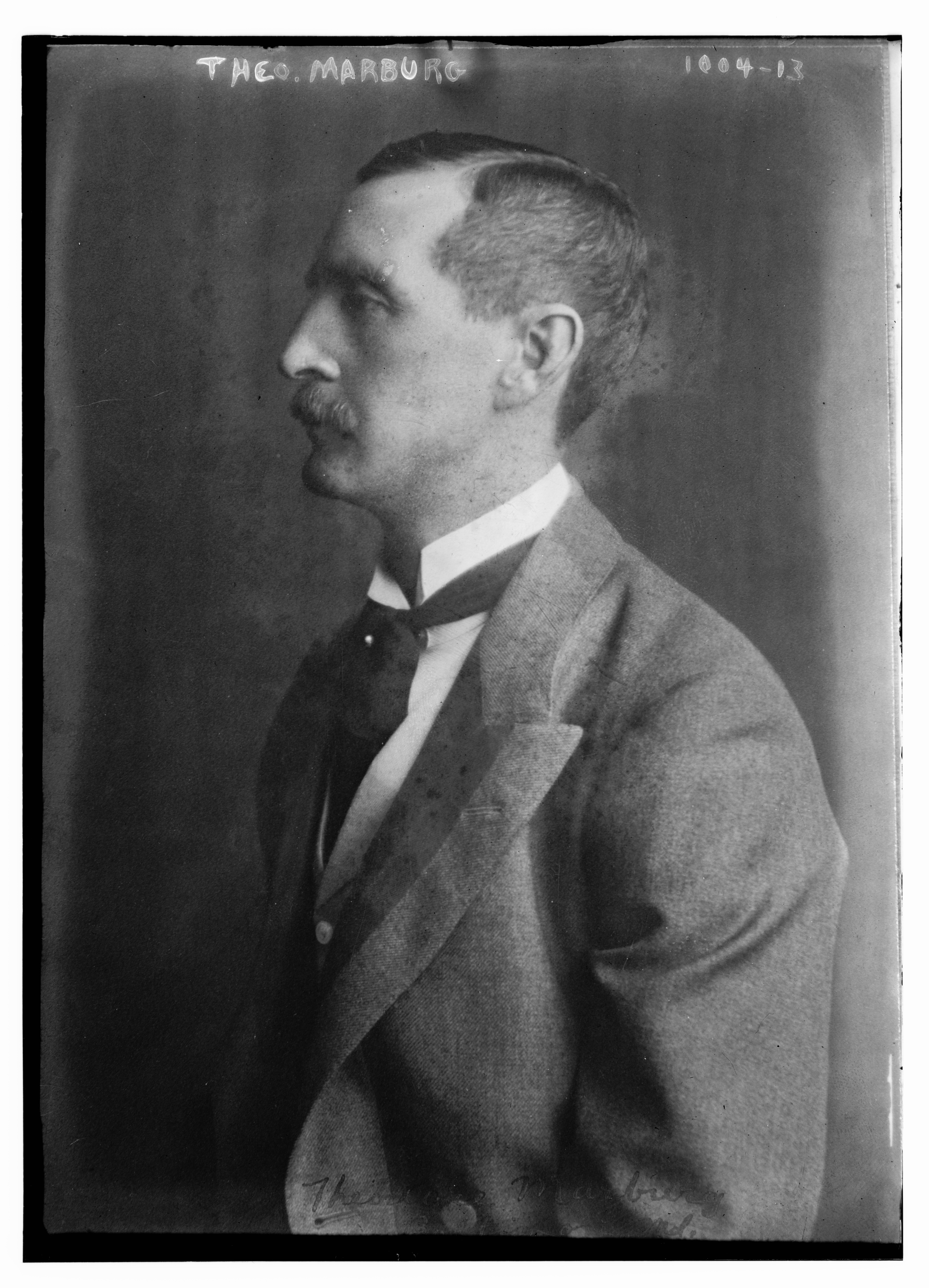

United States Ambassador to Belgium
- In office 1912–1914

Personal details
- Born: July 10, 1862 Baltimore, Maryland, United States
- Died: March 3, 1946 (aged 83) Vancouver, British Columbia, Canada
- Children: Theodore Marburg Jr.
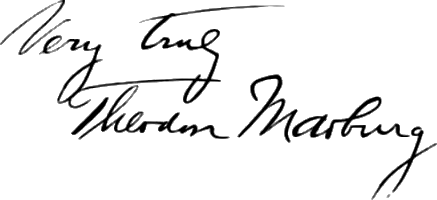
- Signature

Theodore Marburg Sr. (July 10, 1862 – March 3, 1946) was an American jurist, diplomat and internationalist.

== Biography ==
He was born on July 10, 1862, in Baltimore, Maryland. He was the United States Minister to Belgium from 1912 to 1914. He was the executive secretary of the League to Enforce Peace, and a prominent advocate of the League of Nations.

He died in Vancouver on March 3, 1946.

== Legacy ==
His papers are archived at the Library of Congress. His daughter, Christine, married Dutch statesman Alidius Tjarda van Starkenborgh Stachouwer. His son, Theodore Marburg Jr. was one of a small number of Americans who joined the British to fight in World War I before the Americans joined the war.
