= 37th Massachusetts Infantry Regiment =

37th Regiment Massachusetts Volunteer Infantry
- Massachusetts state flag
- Active: July 1862–April 1865
- Country: United States of America
- Allegiance: Union
- Branch: Infantry
- Size: 1,324

The 37th Regiment Massachusetts Volunteer Infantry was an infantry regiment in the Union army during the American Civil War.

== History ==
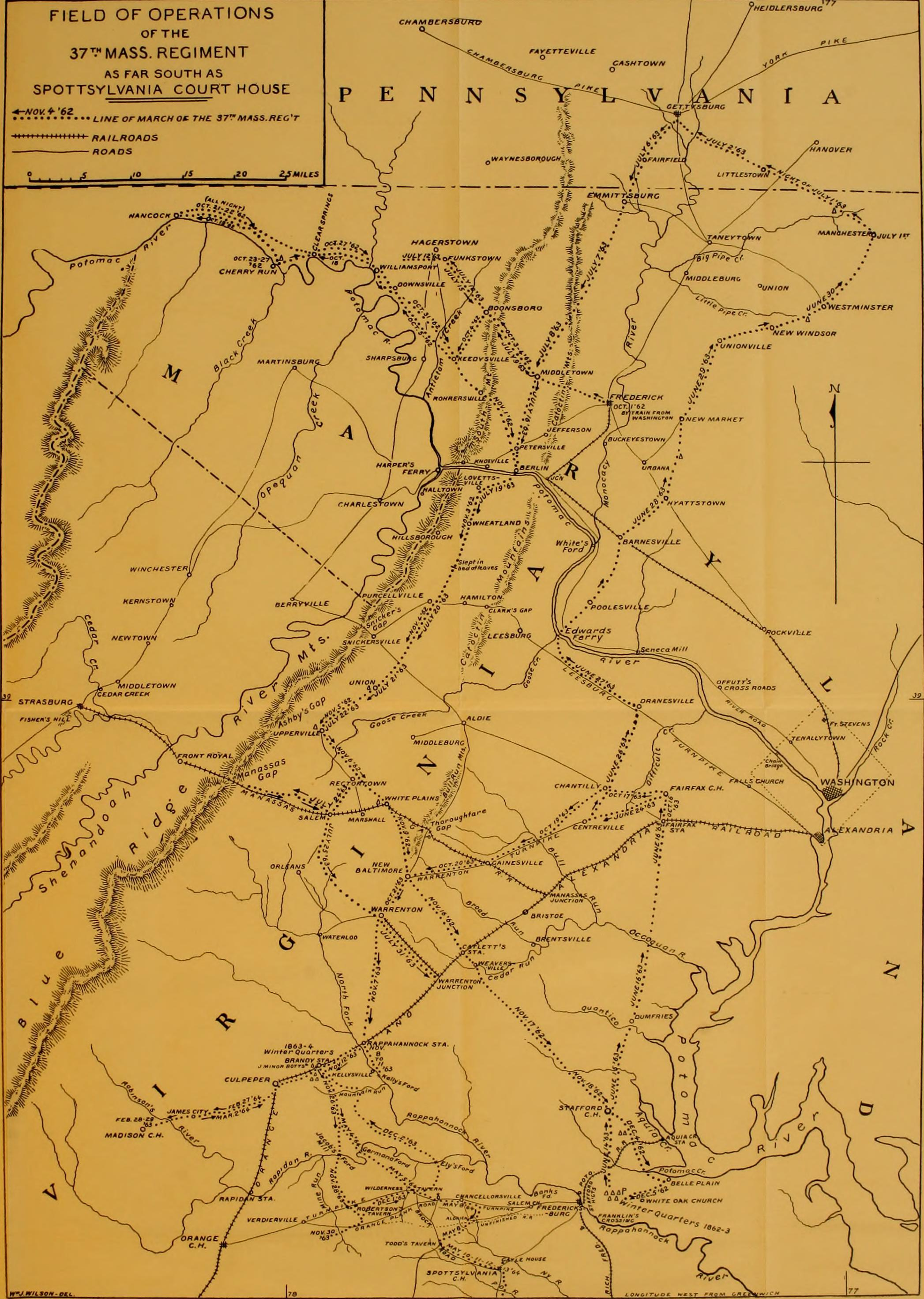
Field of operations of the 37th Massachusetts

The regiment was formed in September 1862 at Camp Briggs, in Pittsfield, Massachusetts under Major Oliver Edwards and served until the end of the war in April 1865. Companies A, B, and C were Zouaves units known as the "Tremont Zouaves" under the command of Capt. C.S. Bird. Their uniforms consisted of a dark blue jacket with red trim, a long red wool sash, chasseur trousers of dark blue wool, a red stocking fez cap, and white canvas leggings.

The 37th Massachusetts saw action at many battles including Fredericksburg and Gettysburg, including duty in New York City after the draft riot. They participated in the Siege of Petersburg and the final pursuit and destruction of Robert E. Lee's army.

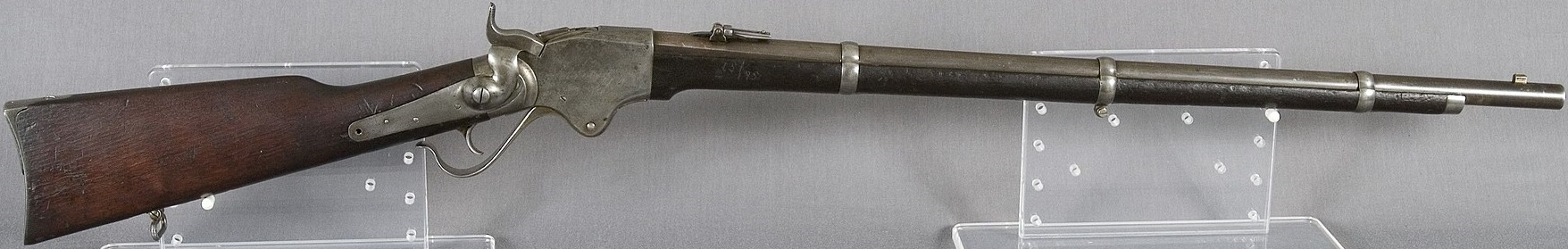
In the summer of 1864, the regiment received the Spencer repeating rifle which greatly increased its firepower.

It was formed from volunteers mainly from the far western counties of Massachusetts, and it subsequently absorbed members of other units (notably the 7th and the 10th Massachusetts) in May and June 1864. The 37th was one of the first regiments to be issued the new Spencer repeating rifle, on July 15, 1864, increasing their firepower. During service in the regiment a total of 4 Officers and 165 enlisted men were killed or mortally wounded, and 92 enlisted men were killed by disease. Total 261.

During the Battle of Sailor's Creek Virginia, April 6, 1865, Private David Dunnels White of the 37th Massachusetts Regiment, was credited with capturing Confederate Major General George Washington Custis Lee, eldest son of the famed General Robert E. Lee.
