= George Washington Custis Lee =

Confederate Army general (1832–1913)

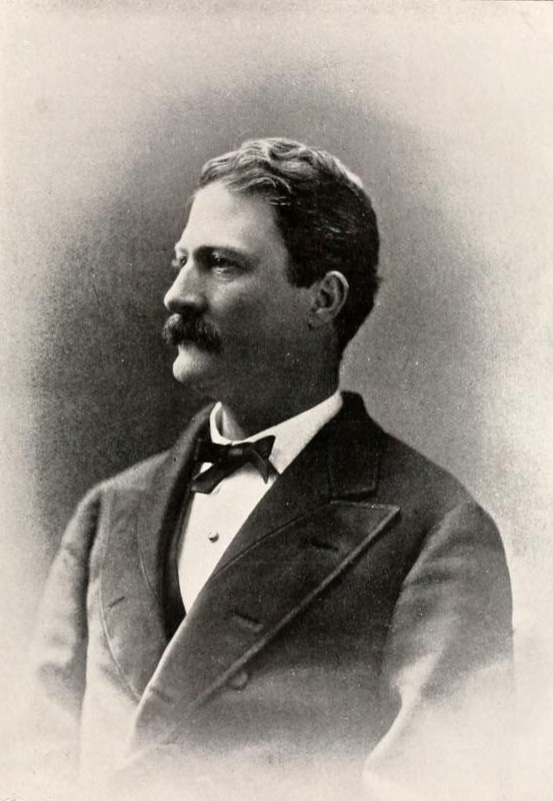
- Custis Lee, c. 1897
- Born: September 16, 1832; Fort Monroe, Virginia, U.S.
- Died: February 18, 1913 (aged 80); Alexandria, Virginia, U.S.
- Burial place: University Chapel, Lexington, Virginia, U.S.
- Education: United States Military Academy
- Military career
- Allegiance: United States; Confederate States
- Branch: United States Army; Confederate States Army
- Service years: 1854–1861 (USA), 1861–1865 (CSA)
- Rank: First Lieutenant (USA); Major General (CSA)
- Conflicts: American Civil War

George Washington Custis Lee (September 16, 1832 – February 18, 1913), also known as Custis Lee, was the eldest son of Robert E. Lee, of the Lee Family of Virginia, and Mary Anna Randolph Custis Lee. His grandfather, George Washington Parke Custis, was the grandson of Martha Dandridge Custis Washington (the wife of George Washington). He served as a Confederate general in the U.S. Civil War, primarily as an aide-de-camp to President Jefferson Davis, and succeeded his father as president of Washington and Lee University in Lexington, Virginia.

== Early life ==
George Washington Custis Lee was born in Fort Monroe, Virginia. He was educated at numerous boarding schools to prepare him in his father's footsteps. He was educated at the classical school of Reverend George A. Smith in his younger years. He then entered the mathematical school of Benjamin Hallowell. When Lee was not admitted to West Point at age 16, his father, Robert E. Lee, sent a letter to General Winfield Scott on his son's behalf, which precipitated a nomination from Zachary Taylor. Lee was then accepted to West Point at 17.

== West Point and U.S. Army ==
From 1850 to 1854, Lee attended West Point. During his first year, Lee excelled both academically and militarily. Toward the end of his first year he was almost expelled, when alcohol was found in his room. He claimed that he did not put it there, and got away with only minor punishments. He did well in his second year also. At the beginning of his third year, his father became the Superintendent of the U.S. Military Academy. Lee graduated first in his class of forty-six, in 1854. Other members of his class included J.E.B. Stuart, William Dorsey Pender, Oliver Otis Howard, John Pegram, James Deshler, Horace Randal, and John Villepigue.

Custis Lee was then commissioned in the Corps of Engineers, as his father before him. He was given the rank of brevet second lieutenant. He served primarily in California, Georgia, and Florida during his time in the United States Army. In 1855, he was given the rank of second lieutenant in the Regular Army. In 1859, Lee was commissioned a first lieutenant. Lee was then stationed in Washington D.C., during the period of secession and Fort Sumter. He then resigned from the Army, in the spring of 1861 after Virginia seceded from the Union. He resigned about two weeks after his father had done the same. Lee then offered his services to his father's Virginia state forces.

== American Civil War ==
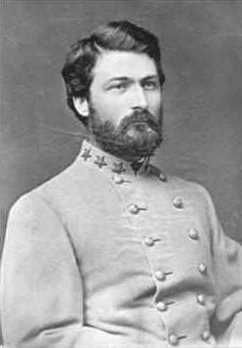
Lee in uniform, c. 1862

Custis Lee served in the Virginia state forces until July 1861. At that time he was given a commission as a captain in the Confederate States Army. During the next few months, Lee worked in the Confederate Engineers. He spent his time constructing fortifications for the new capital city, Richmond. At the end of August 1861, Lee was offered and accepted the position of aide-de-camp to Confederate President Jefferson Davis. He was then promoted to the rank of colonel. Lee served in his position for the next three years of the war. He was often sent on missions to assess the military, and would then return to report to Davis. When Robert E. Lee became the commander of the Army of Northern Virginia, Custis Lee had constant contact with his father. In 1862, during the Peninsula Campaign, Custis Lee was put in charge of supervising the engineers at Drewry's Bluff.

In June 1863, he was promoted to brigadier general. Lee was discouraged from taking a field command by Davis, but encouraged by his father. Lee asked his father for a field command, but his father replied that his highest duty was obedience to his superiors. For the most part, he obeyed Davis, but during the Battle of Gettysburg, Custis Lee was given the command of the troops in Richmond. In 1864, Custis Lee was placed in command of Richmond's local defenses against General Grant and General Benjamin Butler. He did so well that he was given command of Richmond's eastern defenses at Chaffin's Bluff. Lee remained at Chaffin's Bluff throughout the next months, and in 1864, he was promoted to major general. Shortly before the end of the war, he commanded troops in the field and was captured at Sayler's Creek by David Dunnels White a private in the 37th Massachusetts Infantry Regiment on April 6; three days before his father surrendered on Palm Sunday April 9, 1865, to Lieutenant-General Ulysses S. Grant at the McLean House in the village of Appomattox Court House, Virginia (see: Appomattox Court House National Historical Park).

== Later life ==
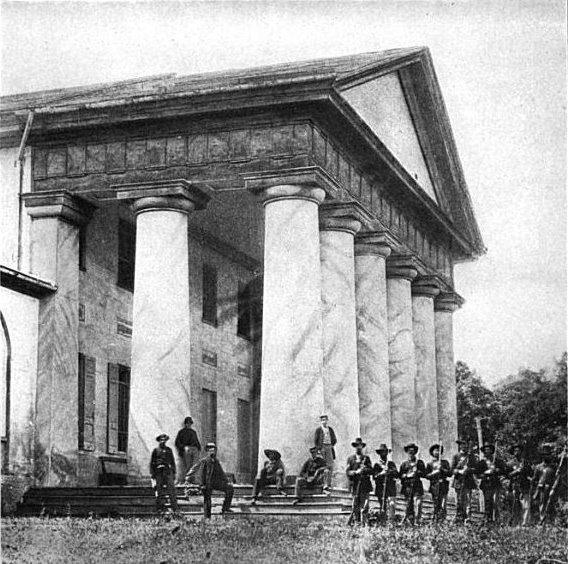
Arlington House, c. 1862

In late 1865, Lee was hired as a professor at the Virginia Military Institute. Lee held this position until the death of his father. Between 1871 and 1897, Lee served as the ninth president of Washington and Lee University. In 1877, seven years after his father's death, Custis Lee sued in a case with assistance from Robert Lincoln that went all the way to the United States Supreme Court to regain title to the family mansion, Arlington House and plantation, which had become Arlington National Cemetery. Lee's case, United States v. Lee (106 U.S. 196), was decided in his favor by a 5–4 vote, in 1882. Lee won both the house and the 1,100 acres (4.5 km^{2}) surrounding the mansion, but was less interested in retaining the estate than gaining a cash compensation for its value. In 1883, Lee sold Arlington House back to the United States Government for $150,000. In 1897, Lee resigned as president of Washington and Lee University. He then moved to the home of his late brother, Major General William Henry Fitzhugh Lee's Ravensworth Mansion. Custis Lee died on February 18, 1913, in Alexandria, Virginia, and is buried in the University Chapel, near his family members. He never married, and had no children.

== See also ==
- List of American Civil War generals (Confederate)

== Bibliography ==
- Eicher, John H., and David J. Eicher, Civil War High Commands. Stanford: Stanford University Press, 2001. ISBN 978-0-8047-3641-1.
- Heidler, David Stephen, Heidler, Jeanne T., Coles, David J.; "Encyclopedia of the American Civil War: a political, social, and military history", W. W. Norton & Company, (2002)
- Lee, Edmund Jennings; "Lee of Virginia, 1642–1892: biographical and genealogical sketches of the descendants of Colonel Richard Lee", Genealogical Publishing Company, (1974)
- Miller, Francis Trevelyan, Lanier, Robert Sampson; "The Photographic History of the Civil War ...: Poetry and eloquence of Blue and Gray", Review of Reviews Co., (1911)
- McCabe, William Gordon; "Major-General George Washington Custis Lee", (1914)
- Sifakis, Stewart. Who Was Who in the Civil War. New York: Facts On File, 1988. ISBN 978-0-8160-1055-4.
- Warner, Ezra J. (1959). Generals in Gray: Lives of the Confederate Commanders (1st ed.). Baton Rouge: Louisiana State University Press. OCLC 445052.
- White, Frank Everett Jr. (2008). Sailor's Creek: Major General G. W. Custis Lee, Captured with Controversy. Lynchburg, Virginia: Schroeder Publications. ISBN 978-1-889246-40-6.

Academic offices
Preceded by Nicholas B. Worthington	President of the Maryland Agricultural College; 1867	Succeeded by Charles Minor
Preceded by Robert E. Lee	President of Washington and Lee University; 1871–1897	Succeeded by William Lyne Wilson
