= David Dunnels White =

American soldier & farmer (1844–1924)

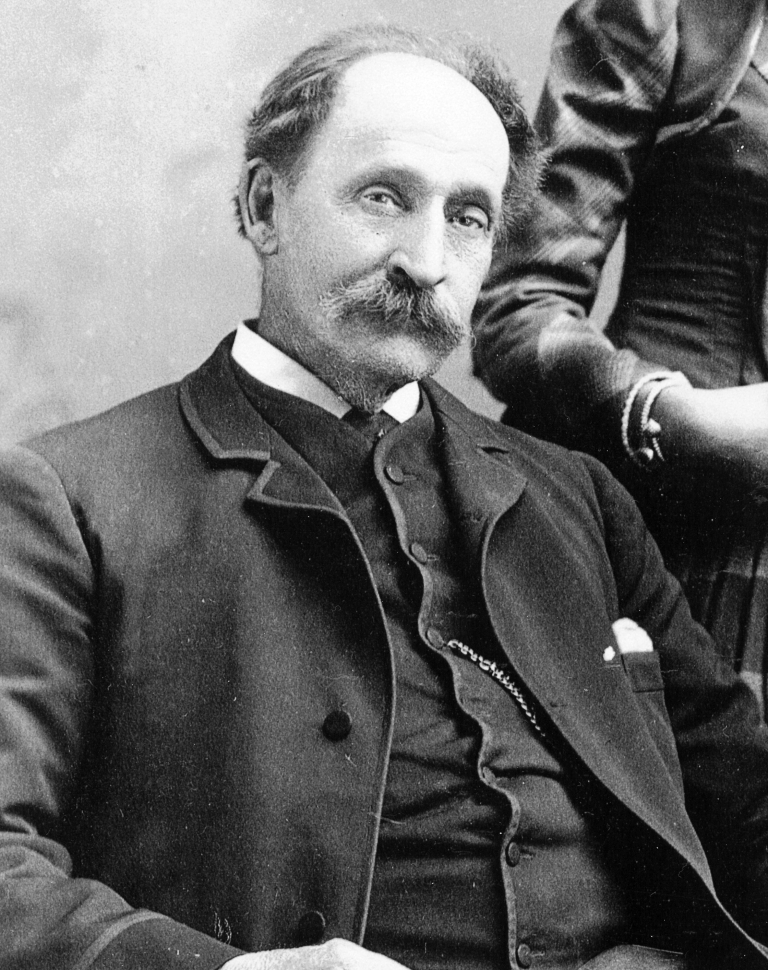
- White, circa 1885
- Born: David Dunnels White; April 14, 1844; Cheshire, Massachusetts, U.S.
- Died: September 9, 1924 (aged 80) Hawley, Massachusetts, U.S.
- Buried: Bozrah Cemetery, Hawley, Massachusetts, U.S.
- Allegiance: United States
- Branch: United States Army
- Service years: 1862–1865
- Rank: Corporal
- Conflicts: American Civil War

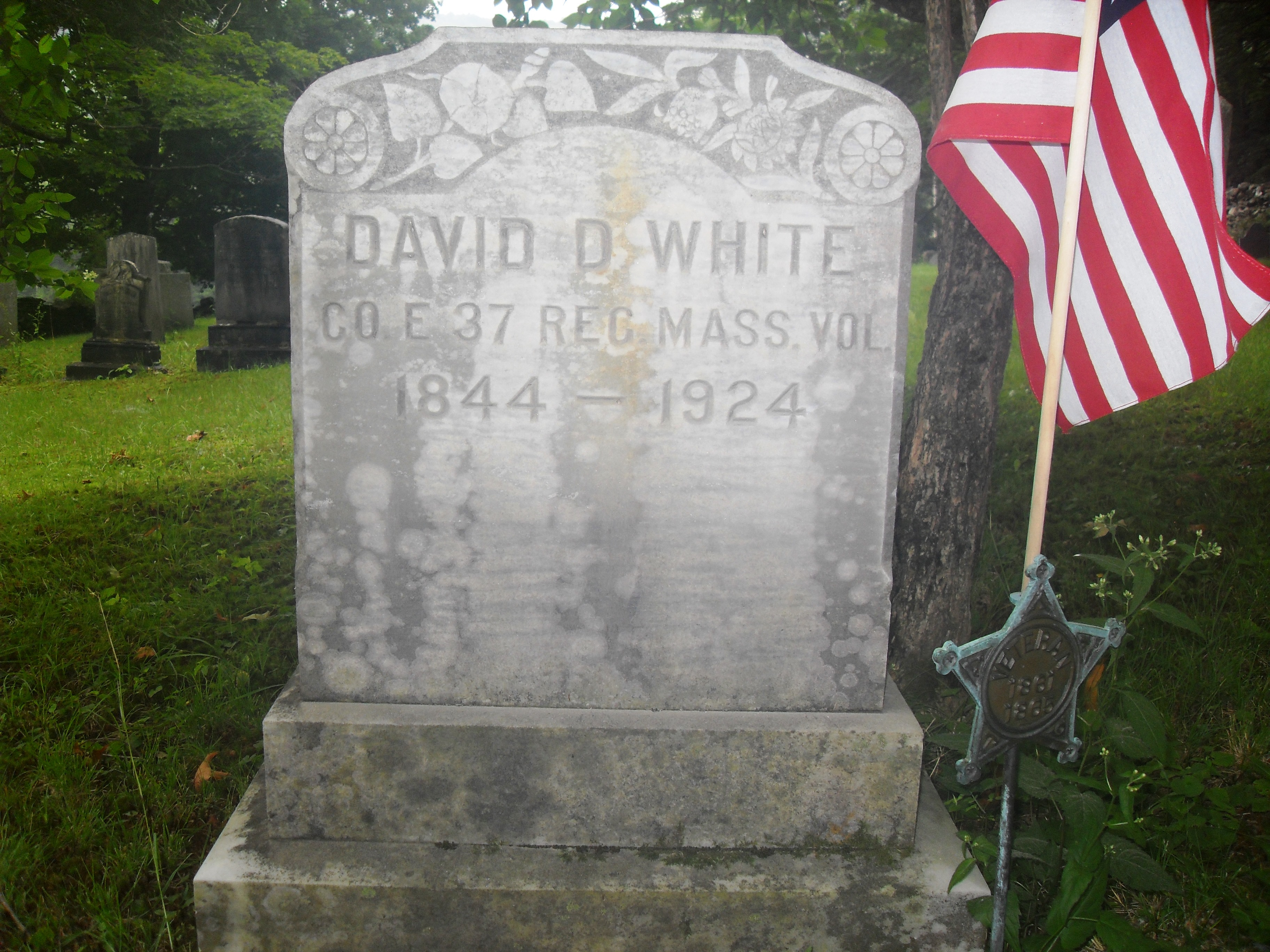
Tombstone of David Dunnels White, located in the Bozrah Cemetery, East Hawley, Massachusetts

David Dunnels White (April 14, 1844 – February 9, 1924) was an American farmer who served as a Union soldier during the American Civil War. His "single-handed capture of Confederate Major General George Washington Custis Lee" in 1865 became widely publicized in 2011 as an act that possibly ended the war early, saving many lives. His nomination for a Medal of Honor was declined by the United States Army in 2016.

== Biography ==
David Dunnels White was born in Cheshire, Massachusetts, the son of Stewart and Elizabeth White née Ames. A farmer, White enlisted in the Union Army on August 21, 1862, as a private soldier within the 37th Massachusetts Infantry Volunteers of the VI Corps.

On April 6, 1865, Private White spotted a Confederate general officer during hand-to-hand combat in the Battle of Sailor's Creek, Virginia. Private White broke through the Union/Confederate battle line and confronted the officer, halted him at gunpoint, and demanded his surrender. The Confederate officer was Major General G. W. Custis Lee, a major general within the Army of Northern Virginia. Initially, Lee refused to surrender to an enlisted man, but he did surrender when White took him to his commanding officer, Lieutenant William Morrill. In White's own words, he was "thunderstruck" to learn that he had just captured the eldest son of General Robert E. Lee, the commander of the Army of Northern Virginia. Harris S. Hawthorne of the 121st New York Infantry also laid claim to Lee's capture and was awarded a Medal of Honor for it in 1894. Three years later, a protest was lodged on behalf of White, but was rejected, as was an appeal of the rejection. In an appeal for the Army to reconsider its denial, Civil War historian Sharon MacDonald argues that Hawthorne lied; White's account was Lee was recaptured after he escaped, having already been disarmed, and in the 2011 Medal of Honor request for White, the United States Army Center of Military History supports White's claim.

White was discharged in Virginia on July 3, 1865, with the rank of corporal, returned to farming in Massachusetts. He married Maria Hannah McVee on July 21, 1866, in Adams, Massachusetts. She died on October 25, 1869, and was buried in Maple Street Cemetery in Adams. On November 28, 1872, he married Belle L. Gillett in Cheshire, Massachusetts. He died on February 9, 1924, in Hawley, Massachusetts, and is buried in Bozrah Cemetery there. He was survived by his wife, who died on October 9, 1928, in Hawley, Massachusetts, and is also buried in Bozrah Cemetery.

== Medal of Honor nomination ==
White was nominated to receive a posthumous award of the Medal of Honor by former Massachusetts senators John Kerry and Scott Brown, current Massachusetts Senators Elizabeth Warren and Ed Markey, Massachusetts Representatives Richard Neal and Niki Tsongas, New Jersey Representative Leonard Lance and Oklahoma Senator Jim Inhofe. This Medal of Honor case is still under review by the United States Army. The Army Decorations Board in Fort Knox, Kentucky, however, recommended on July 11, 2011, that David D. White receive a Medal of Honor for the capture of Confederate Major General Custis Lee at the Battle of Sailor's Creek, Virginia. His official citation is: "...for the single-handed capture of Confederate Major General George Washington Custis Lee during the 'hand to hand' Battle of Sailor's Creek, Virginia, on April 6, 1865". White's capture of Confederate Major General Custis Lee, a Confederate Division commander at the Battle of Sailor's Creek, brought an early end to the fighting, saving many lives on both sides.

David Dunnels White's nomination was under consideration for the capture of Confederate Major General G. W. Custis Lee, eldest son of General Robert E. Lee, at the Battle of Sailor's Creek, Virginia, on April 6, 1865. The nomination was not recommended for further consideration by the Army's Senior Decorations Board that considers the Medal of Honor, and was disapproved by the Secretary of the Army on March 8, 2016.
