= Atlanta in the American Civil War =

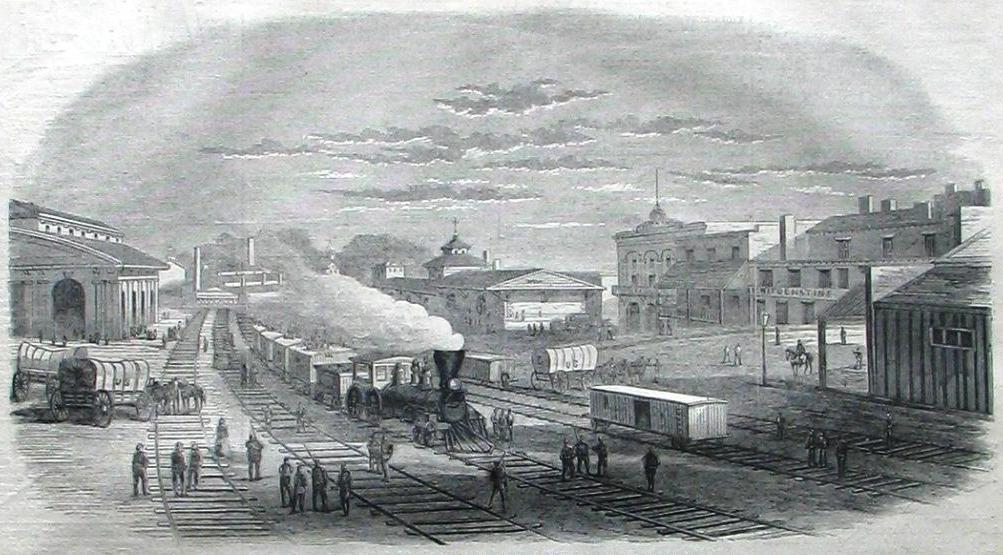
View in Atlanta, Georgia, 1864

The city of Atlanta, Georgia, in Fulton County, was an important rail and commercial center during the American Civil War. Although relatively small in population, the city became a critical point of contention during the Atlanta campaign in 1864 when a powerful Union Army approached from Union-held Tennessee. The fall of Atlanta was a critical point in the Civil War, increasing the North's confidence and (along with the victories at Mobile Bay and Winchester) leading to the re-election of President Abraham Lincoln and the eventual dissolution of the Confederacy. The capture of the "Gate City of the South" was especially important for Lincoln in his contentious election campaign against the Democratic opponent George B. McClellan.

== Early war years ==
Population in 1860
Region	Fulton	Georgia
Total population	14,427	1,057,286
Total white persons	11,441	591,550
Total slaveholders	478	41,084
aggr. Slaves	2,955	462,198
aggr. Free colored persons	31	3,500
Families	1,995	109,919
% of families owning slaves (Note: Total Slave holders / Number of families.)	23.86%	37.38%

The city that would become Atlanta began as the endpoint of the Western and Atlantic Railroad (aptly named Terminus) in 1837. Atlanta grew quickly with the completion of The Georgia Railway in 1845 and the Macon & Western in 1846. The city was incorporated in 1847 and extended 1 mile in all directions from the zero-mile post. In 1860, Atlanta was a relatively small city ranking 99th in the United States in size with a population of 9,554 according to the 1860 United States (U.S.) Census. However, it was the 13th-largest city in what became the Confederate States of America. A large number of machine shops, foundries and other industrial concerns were soon established in Atlanta. The population swelled to nearly 22,000 as workers arrived for these new factories and warehouses.

The city was a vital transportation and logistics center, with several major railroads in the area. The Western & Atlantic Railroad connected the city with Chattanooga, Tennessee, 138 miles to the north. The Georgia Railway connected the city with Augusta to the east and the Confederate Powderworks on the Savannah River. The Macon & Western connected Atlanta to Macon and Savannah to its south. The fourth line, Atlanta and West Point Railroad, completed in 1854, connected Atlanta with West Point, Georgia. At West Point the line linked up with the Western Railway of Alabama, thus connecting Atlanta with Montgomery to its west. A series of roads radiated out from the city in all directions, connecting Atlanta with neighboring towns and states.

Thought to be relatively safe from Union forces early in the war, Atlanta rapidly became a concentration point for the Confederate quartermasters and logistics experts; warehouses were filled with food, forage, supplies, ammunition, clothing and other materiel critical to the Confederate States of America armies operating in the Western Theater.

Some of the major manufacturing facilities supporting the Confederate war effort were:

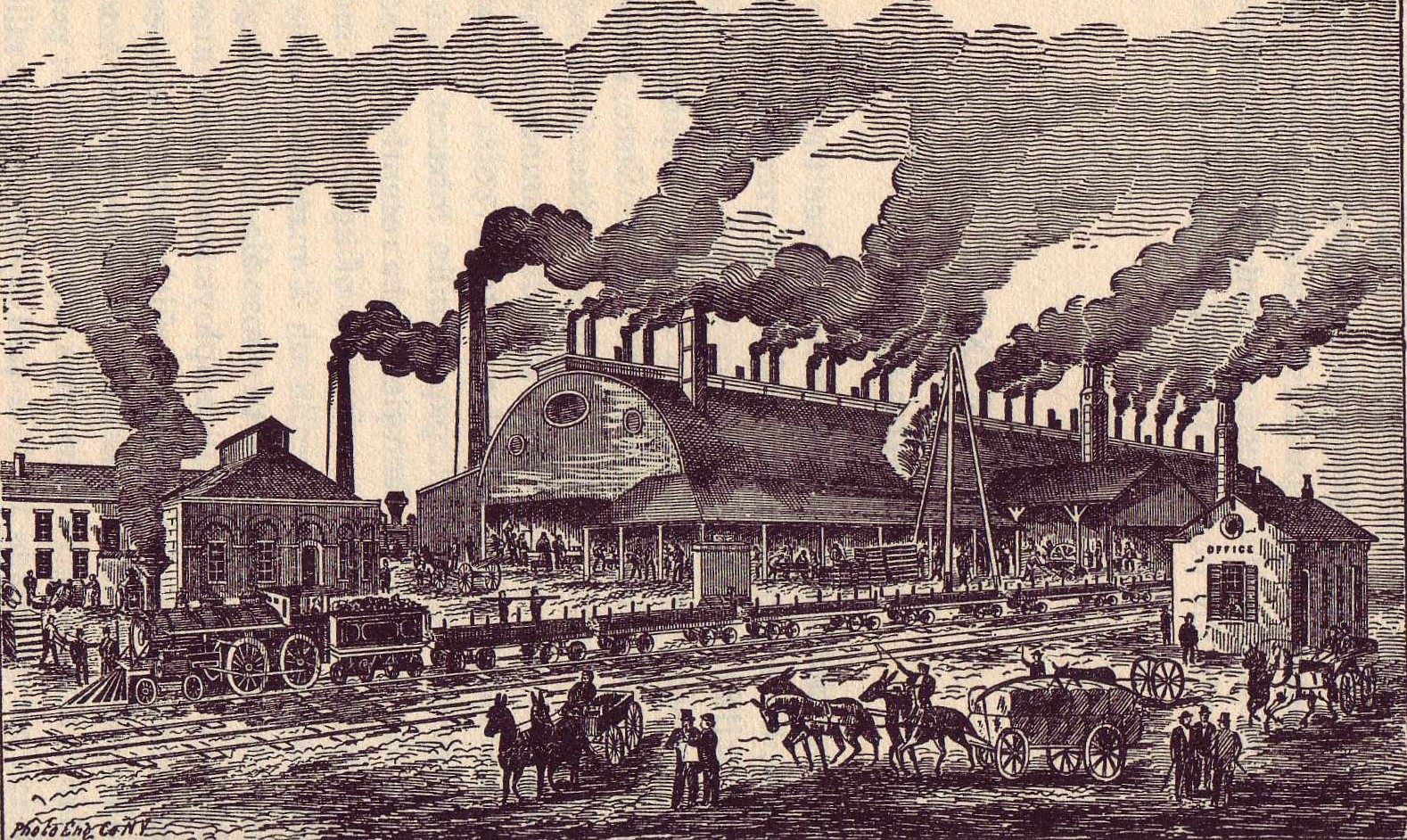
The Atlanta Rolling Mill produced armor plating for ironclads

- The Atlanta Rolling Mill, established before the war, was significantly expanded and provided a major source for armor plating for Confederate Navy ironclads, including the CSS Virginia. It also refurbished railroad tracks.
- The Confederate Pistol Factory made pistols.
- The Novelty Iron Works produced ordnance supplies.
- Confederate Arsenal was located at the northwest corner of Walton and Peachtree Street.
- The Empire Manufacturing Company made Railroad cars and bar iron.
- Winship Foundry produced great quantities of metal products, railroad supplies, freight cars, and iron bolts.
- Atlanta Machine Works produced ordnance. The cannons produced by the Atlanta Machine Works were rifled at the Western and Atlantic Roundhouse.
- W. S. Withers and Solomon Solomon Foundry made buttons, spurs, bits, buckles, etc.
- A Flour Mill was located at the northwest corner of Marietta and North Avenue.
- Hammond Marshall Sword Factory manufactured swords.
- Atlanta Steam Tannery made leather goods for the army.
- The Naval Ordnance Works was set up in early 1862 by Lieutenant David Porter McCorkle using stores and machinery he was able to move to Atlanta from New Orleans before it fell. The works produced gun carriages and 7-inch (180 mm) shells for the Confederate navy.
- The Confederate Iron and Brass Foundry produced all kinds of iron and brass works.

In addition to the transportation and manufacturing facilities, there were several hospitals in Atlanta.

- The General Hospital was located on the fairground, on Fair Street.
- The Distribution Hospital was located on the southeast corner of Alabama and Pryor Streets.
- The Atlanta Female Institute on Courtland Street was used as a hospital.
- The Atlanta Medical College was used as a surgical hospital.
- Kiles Hotel on Decatur and Loyd Streets was used as a hospital.
- A hotel on Peachtree was used as a hospital.
- The convalescent hospital was located on the Ponder property at Means Street and Ponder Avenue.
- The hospital for contagious diseases was located on 155 acres of property taken from William Markham.

On July 5, 1864, General Joseph E. Johnston issued orders that all hospitals and munitions works in Atlanta be evacuated. On July 7, Colonel Josiah Georgas, ordnance chief in Richmond, issued orders to Colonel M. H. Wright, commanding the arsenal in Atlanta: "Send the bulk of machinery & stores to Augusta and to Columbia, S.C., send workmen in same direction when it becomes necessary."

A number of newspapers flourished in Atlanta during the Civil War. Among the more prominent ones were the Atlanta Southern Confederacy and the Daily Intelligencer, both of which moved to Macon, Georgia, during the Union occupation in 1864. The Daily Intelligencer was the only Atlanta paper to survive the war and resume publication from Atlanta after Union forces began their "March to the Sea".

== Atlanta as a target ==
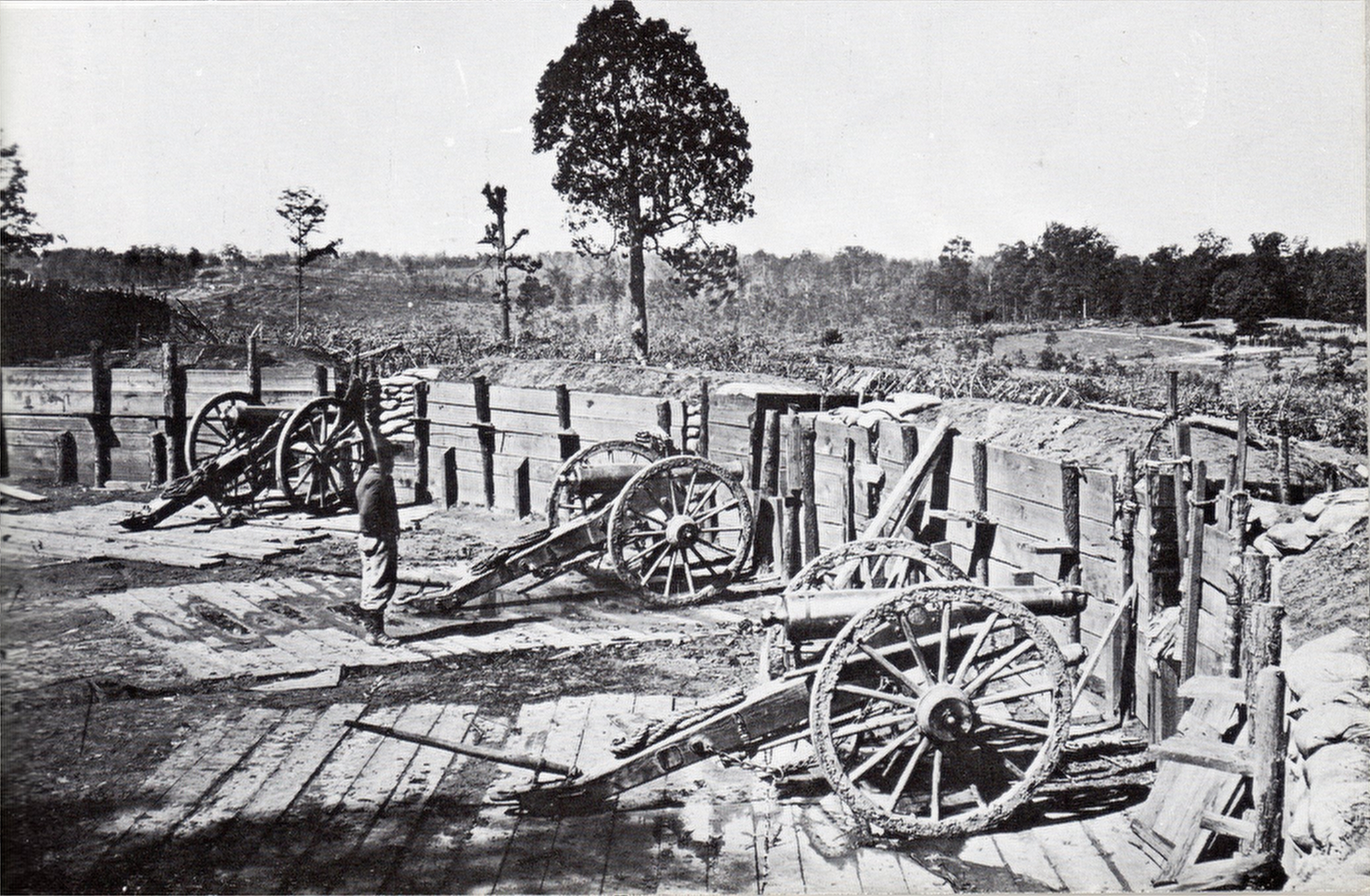
Confederate sappers constructed a number of artillery emplacements covering the avenues of approach to Atlanta. The artillery in this fortification overlooks Peachtree Street

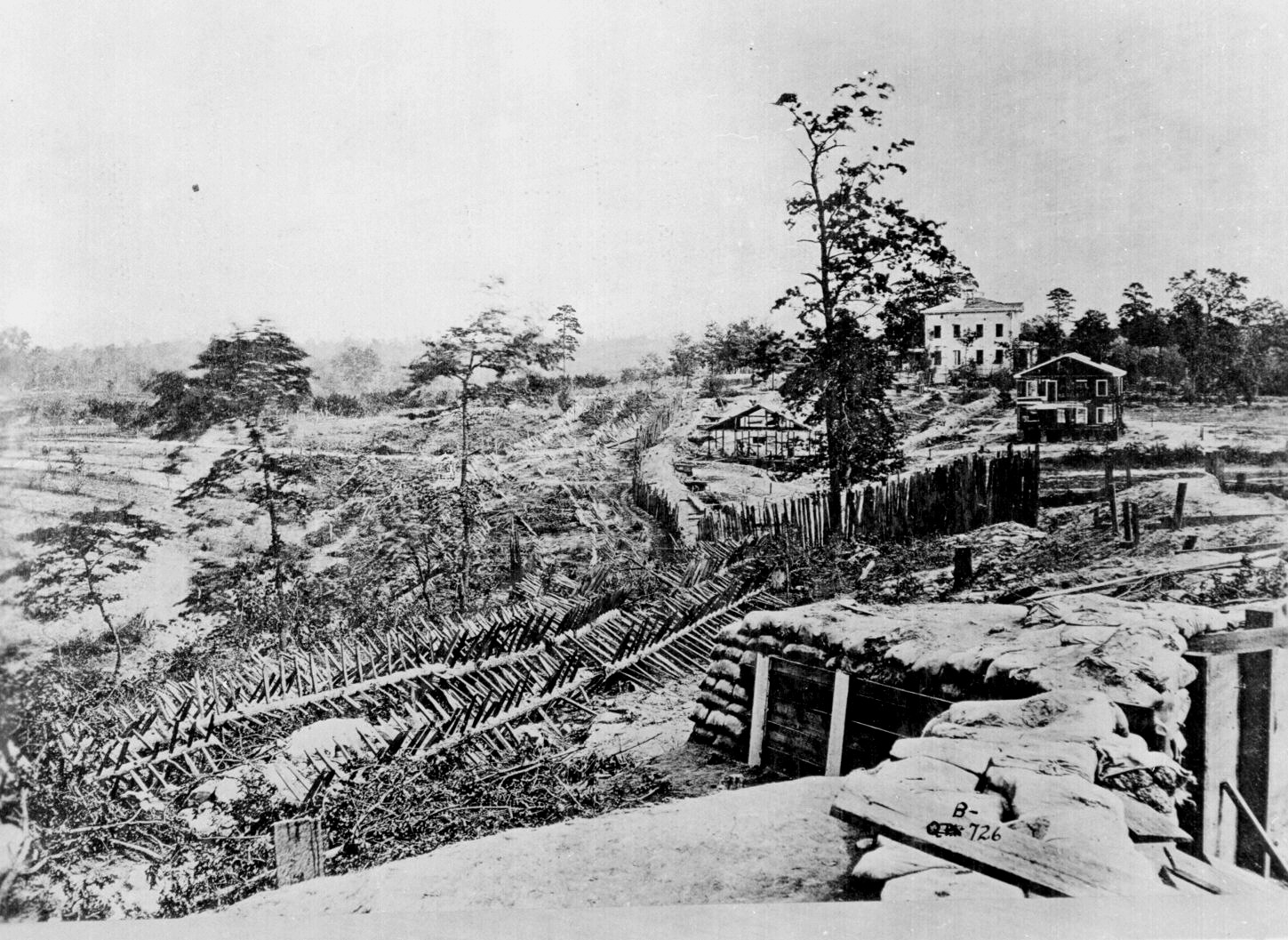
Palisades and chevaux de frise in front of the Ponder House, Atlanta, Georgia, 1864

Concerned after the fall of Vicksburg on July 4, 1863, that Atlanta would be a logical target for future Union Army attacks, Jeremy F. Gilmer, Chief of the Confederate Engineer Bureau, contacted Captain Lemuel P. Grant, Chief Engineer of the Department of Georgia, and asked him to survey possible enemy crossings of the Chattahoochee River, a broad waterway that offered some protection from a northern approach. Grant complied, and after a thorough investigation and survey, explained that the fortification of Atlanta would involve "an expenditure second only to the defense of Richmond". Captain Grant planned "a cordon of enclosed works, within supporting distance of each other", with twelve to fifteen strong forts sited specially for artillery and connected by infantry entrenchments in a perimeter "between 10 and 12 miles in extent". Gilmer gave Grant the approval to develop a plan to ring Atlanta with forts and earthworks along the key approaches to the city. Gilmer advised that the earthen forts should be connected by a line of rifle pits, with ditches, felled timbers or other obstruction to impede an infantry charge. Gilmer also suggested that the perimeter should be "far enough from the town to prevent the enemy coming within bombarding distance"

General Gilmer knew that the construction of the Atlanta Fortification would, by its scope, impact private property. He advised Col. M. J. Wright:

HEADQUARTERS, ETC.,
Charleston, S. C., October 21, 1863.

Col. M. J. WRIGHT
Commanding, Atlanta, Ga.:

COLONEL: In order to make the works constructed for the defense of Atlanta effective, the timber must be cut down in front of the lines for a distance of, say, 900 to 1,000 cubic yards, and the cutting should be continuous.

The true rule should be to clear away as far as our own guns can (command the ground, well and no farther, as the ranges of the enemy's artillery are generally greater than ours. The work ought to be commenced at once, as it will require some time to complete it; the forest in front of the batteries to be cleared away first. In all cases have the trees thrown from the lines and the branches that stand up from the felled trees cut off so that they may offer no cover. The stumps ought not to be high.

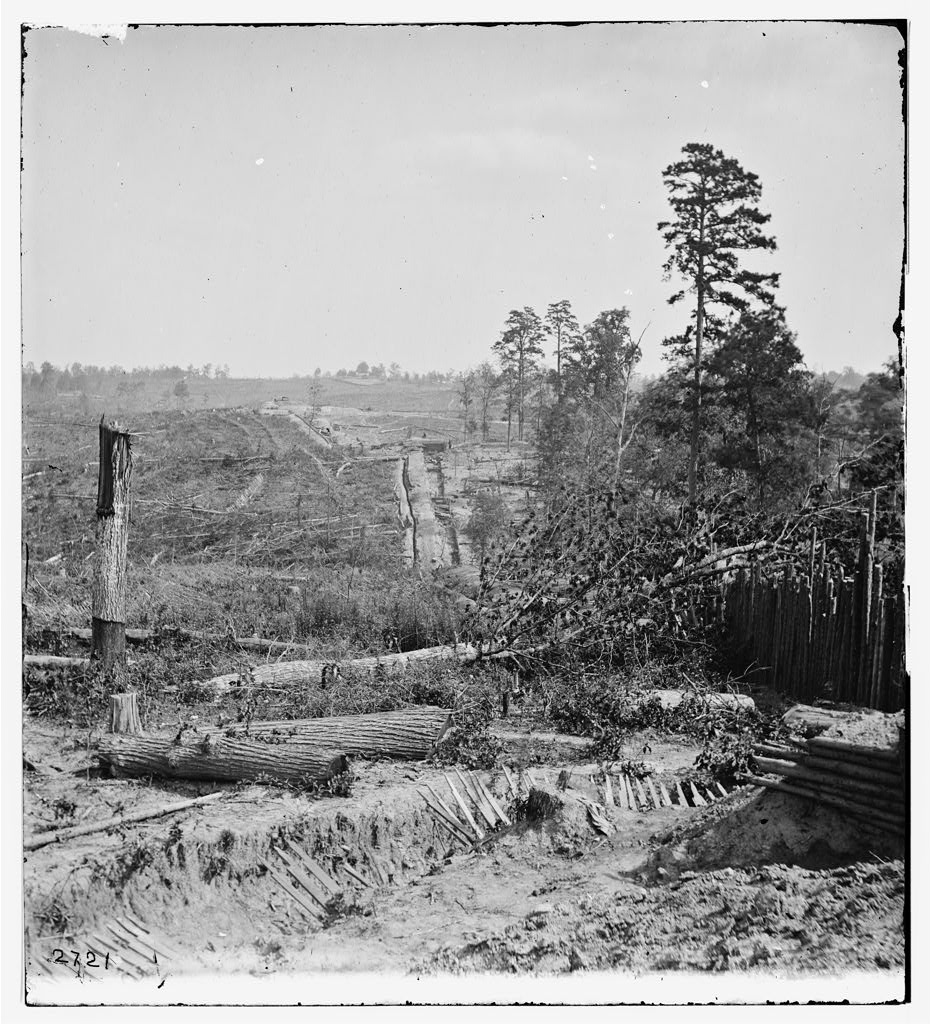
Part of the fortifications surrounding Atlanta, Georgia, in 1864 during the Civil war.

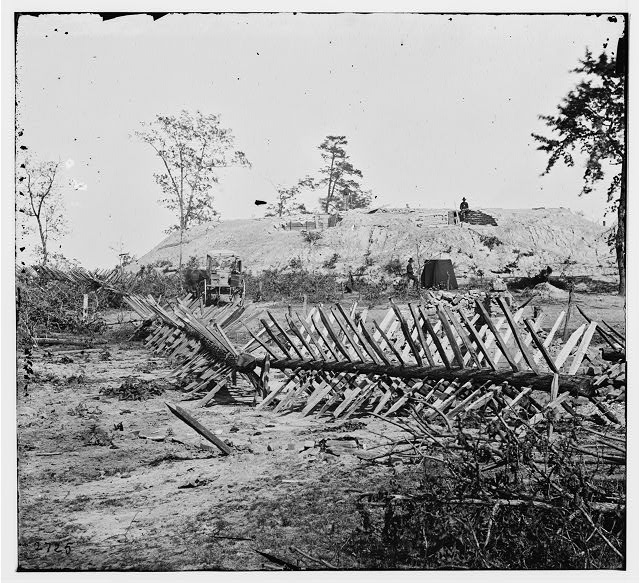
Confederate fortifications around Atlanta, Georgia, in 1864. The wagon and portable darkroom of photographer George N. Barnard is visible in the photograph.

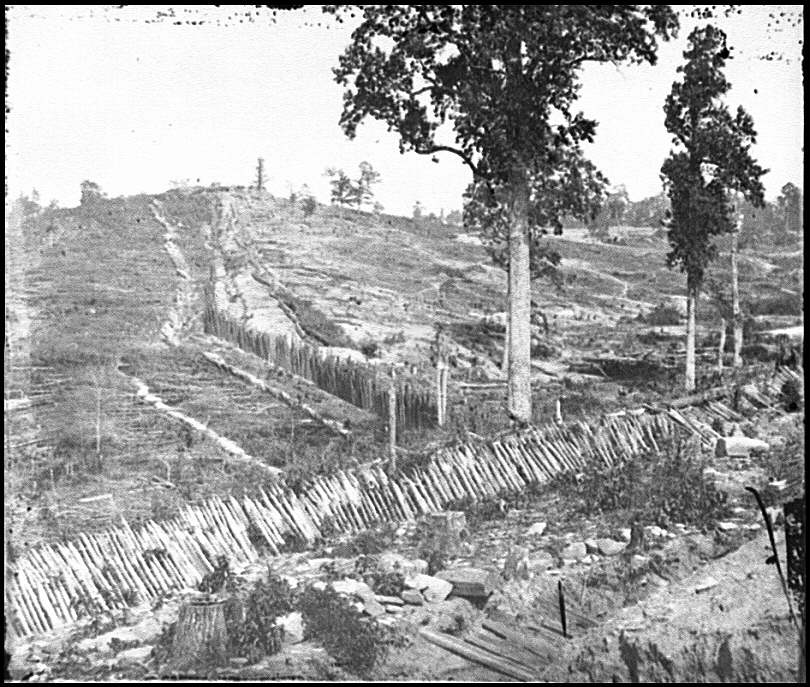
Confederate palisades, on north side of Atlanta, Georgia, 1864

As to damages for putting up works on private lands and cutting timber, they should be assessed by impartial and intelligent persons. A good plan (one that we have resorted to in previous cases) is to appoint an officer of good judgment and the local proprietors to select a second, to make the appraisements and report the same to the engineer officer (Captain Grant) for transmission to the Engineer Bureau. That office will have the appraisement examined and make such indorsements thereon as may be thought just and proper, and then forward them to the Attorney-General, whose duty it is by law to examine them, and, if the claims be well founded, to ask Congress to appropriate for their payment. Should the two appraisers fail to agree they must choose a third as umpire. In each case the property damaged should be described with care. I would like to have the indorsements of yourself and Captain Grant on the appraisements before they are forwarded to the Engineer Bureau.

It is not necessary to apply to Richmond concerning the exterior lines. If you have the labor, press them forward at once, particularly on the front. Direct Captain Grant to apply to the Engineer Bureau for all necessary funds. If needed a reasonable supply of intrenching tools, axes, &c., can be sent him on his application, but I hope you have sufficient from the battle-field of Chickamauga. I am, colonel, very respectfully, your obedient servant,

J. F. GILMER,
Major-General and Chief of Engineer Bureau

Captain Grant planned a series of 17 redoubts forming a 10-mile (16 km) circle over a mile (1.6 km) out from the center of town. These would be interlinked with a series of earthworks and trenches, along with rows of abatis and other impediments to enemy troops. Construction on the extensive defensive works began in August 1863. They were bounded on the north by high ground (the present location of the Fox Theatre), the west by Ashby Street, the south by McDonough Drive and the east by what is today known as Grant Park. Gilmer inspected the completed work in December 1863 and gave his approval. Because of how the subsequent campaign unfolded, most of these fortifications were never really put to the test.

By late October Captain Grant had nearly completed his encirclement of Atlanta and the number of forts had risen to seventeen. Of the seventeen planned forts, thirteen had been completed. Due to topographical features of the land and the manning requirements for the fortifications, Grant's design had, by necessity, left Atlanta within artillery range. The section of the line protecting the north west approach to Atlanta was inside the city limits. To help protect this area, an additional string of forts was constructed further out from the city. A report from Captain Grant to Gen. Wright places the length of the fortifications at 10.5 mi (16.9 km) and requiring about 55,000 troops to fully man the line.

In addition to the fortifications surrounding Atlanta, the local militia was reorganized by Brig. Gen. M. J. Wright during March 1864. The militia was "composed exclusively of detailed soldiers and exempts, all those liable to conscription". The total strength was 534 men.

In 1864, as feared by Jeremy F. Gilmer, Atlanta did indeed become the target of a major Union invasion. The area now covered by metropolitan Atlanta was the scene of several fiercely contested battles, including the Battle of Peachtree Creek, the Battle of Atlanta, Battle of Ezra Church and the Battle of Jonesboro. On September 1, 1864, Confederate Gen. John Bell Hood evacuated Atlanta, after a five-week siege mounted by Union Gen. William Sherman, and ordered all public buildings and possible Confederate assets destroyed.

== Siege of Atlanta (July–August 1864) ==
In the spring of 1864, the Confederate Army of Tennessee, commanded by General Joseph E. Johnston, was entrenched near the city of Dalton, Georgia. In early May, 1864, Union forces under the command of Maj. Gen. William T. Sherman began the Atlanta campaign. By early July the Confederate forces had been forced back to the outskirts of Atlanta. Both the Union and Confederate forces used the Western & Atlantic Railroad to supply their troops.

The last remaining natural obstacle separating the Union forces from Atlanta was the Chattahoochee River. By July 9, the Federal forces had secured three good crossings over the Chattahoochee: one at Powers' Ferry, a second at the mouth of Soap Creek and a third at the shallow ford near Roswell, Georgia. The federal forces rested and moved troops around to prepare for their advance on the city of Atlanta beginning on July 16.

On July 10, Maj. Gen. Sherman sent orders via telegraph to Gen. Lovell H. Rousseau then stationed at Decatur, Alabama, with a force of 2,500 cavalry to cut the rail line linking Atlanta with Montgomery, Alabama. On July 16, Gen. Rousseau's men cut about 25 miles of the rail line, west of Opelika, Alabama, as well as three miles of the branch toward Columbus, Georgia, and two miles towards West Point, Georgia. Gen. Rousseau's cavalry force then joined General Sherman in Marietta, Georgia, on July 22.

Union cavalry forces under the command of Brig. Gen. Kenner Garrard supported by a brigade of infantry cut the Georgia Railroad that connected Atlanta with Augusta, Georgia, near the town of Stone Mountain, GA, on July 18, 1864.

On July 18, 1864, General Joseph E. Johnston was relieved of command of the Confederate forces. General John Bell Hood was given command of the Army of Tennessee.

General Sherman issued Special Order 39, detailing the Union advance on Atlanta on July 19, 1864.

HDQR. Mil. Div. OF THE MISS.

Special Order

In the Field, near Decatur, Ga.,

No. 39.

July 19, 1864.

The whole army will move on Atlanta by the most direct roads tomorrow, July 20, beginning at 5 a. m., as follows:

I. Major-General Thomas from the direction of Buck Head, his left to connect with General Schofields right about two miles northeast of Atlanta, about lot 15, near the houses marked as Hu. and Col. Hoo.
II. Major-General Schofield by the road leading from Doctor Powell's to Atlanta.
III. Major-General McPherson will follow one or more roads direct from Decatur to Atlanta, following substantially the railroad.

Each army commander will accept battle on anything like fair terms, but if the army reach within cannon-range of the city without receiving artillery or musketry fire he will halt, form a strong line, with batteries in position, and await orders. If fired on from the forts or buildings of Atlanta no consideration must be paid to the fact that they are occupied by families, but the place must be cannonaded without the formality of a demand.

The general-in-chief will be with the center of the army, viz, with or near General Schofield.

By order of Maj. Gen. W. T. Sherman:
L. M. DAYTON, aide-de-Camp.

With the Union forces spread out over such a wide front, General Hood launched an attack against the Union right at Peachtree Creek on July 20, 1864. The Confederate advance was repulsed at the Battle of Peach Tree Creek. The Confederates then launched a second attack on July 22, this time against the Union left, east of Atlanta near the Augusta railroad. The Confederates were again repulsed with heavy losses at the Battle of Atlanta. During the Battle of Atlanta Union General James B. McPherson and Confederate General William H. T. Walker were killed. General Sherman had now cut two of the four rail lines leading into Atlanta.

In an effort to cut the Confederate supply lines between West Point, GA, and Atlanta, General Sherman moved forces along the west side of Atlanta. General Hood sent two of his corps to protect his supply lines. Expecting an attack, the Union forces entrenched near Ezra Church. The Confederates attacked on July 28, and were repulsed in the Battle of Ezra Church. Even though the Union forces were victorious in the Battle of Ezra Church, the Union forces failed to cut the rail line supplying Atlanta from West Point.

The Union forces continued to move south on the west side of Atlanta, but the Confederates were able to extend their lines to match these movements. The two sides once again clashed on August 4–7, at Utoy Creek. The Union forces were repulsed with heavy losses and failed in an attempt to break the Atlanta and West Point Railroad.

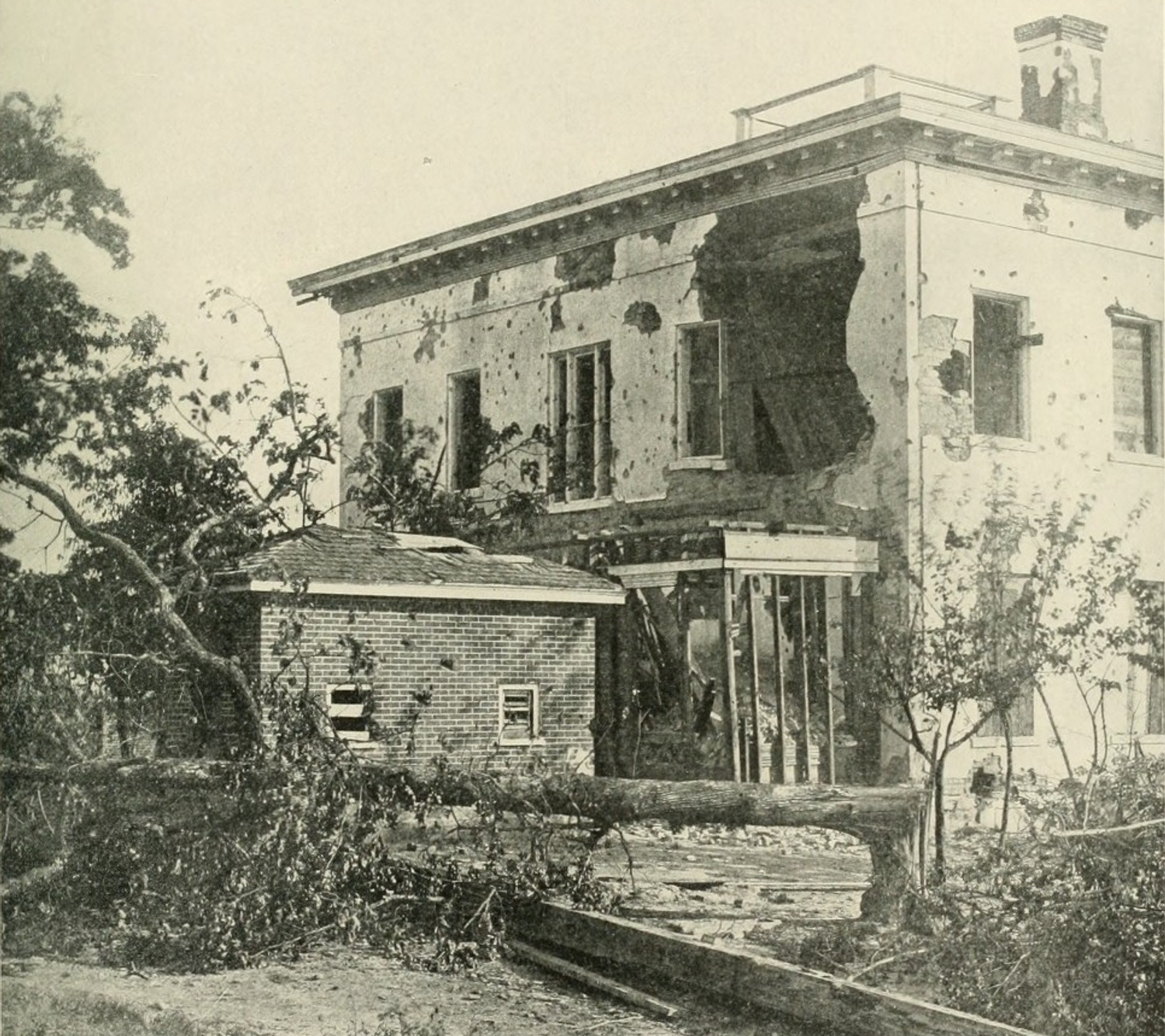
The Ponder House in Atlanta housed Confederate sharpshooters until Union artillery made a special target of it.

On July 20, 1864, Battery H, First Illinois Light Artillery commanded by Capt. Francis De Gress, came into battery near the Troup Hurt Home. De Gress opened fire on downtown Atlanta from this point. He reported that:

Advanced on the 20th, taking up position several times during the day and engaging rebel batteries. At 1 o'clock fired three shells into Atlanta at a distance of two miles and a half, the first ones of the war.

— Capt. Francis De Gress, O.R. Series 1, Volume 38, Part 3, OR# 486, page 265

The shelling of Atlanta continued from July 20 until August 25. In addition to the cannons the Union forces had with them, four 4 1/2-inch (110 mm) siege cannons were brought by rail from Chattanooga. These four cannons began firing on the city on August 10. In total, these four cannons fired over 4,500 rounds on Atlanta. On August 9, 1864, General Sherman reported that:

Maj. Gen. H. W. HALLECK,

Washington, D. C.:

Schofield developed the enemy's position to below East Point. His line is well fortified, embracing Atlanta and East Point, and his re-doubts and lines seem well filled. Cavalry is on his flanks. Our forces, too, are spread for ten miles. So Hood intends to stand his ground. I threw into Atlanta about 3,000 solid shot and shell to-day, and have got from Chattanooga four 4-1/2 Inch rifled guns, and will try their effect. Our right is below Utoy Creek. I will intrench it and the flanks and study time ground a little more before adopting a new plan. We have had considerable rain, but on the whole the weather is healthy. Colonel Capron, of Stoneman's command, with several squads of men are in at Marietta, and will reduce his loss below 1,000.

W. T. SHERMAN,

Major-General.

— W. T. Sherman, O.R. Series 1, Volume 38, Part 5 - Union and Confederate Correspondence, etc., p 434

There are no official records of the number of people killed by the bombardment of Atlanta.

During the early part of August, several attempts were made to cut the two remaining rail lines to Atlanta using cavalry. Even though the Union cavalry successfully tore up sections of the rail line, they were not able to do sufficient damage to prevent the Confederate forces from easily repairing the affected sections of railroad. Union forces also continued to probe the Confederate lines looking for weak spots. Even though no frontal assault was ever made on Atlanta there was a constant skirmishing between the lines and casualties occurred on both sides.

On August 20, the Atlanta and West Point Railroad was cut near Red Oak Station. On August 25, the Union forces withdrew from their entrenchments around Atlanta. Part of the Union forces pulled back to prepare defensive positions at the Chattahoochee River while the remainder of the Union forces marched south of Atlanta to attack the Macon & Western Railroad. On August 31 – September 1, the Confederate forces once again failed to stop the Union troops at the Battle of Jonesboro.

== Fall of Atlanta (September 1–2, 1864) ==
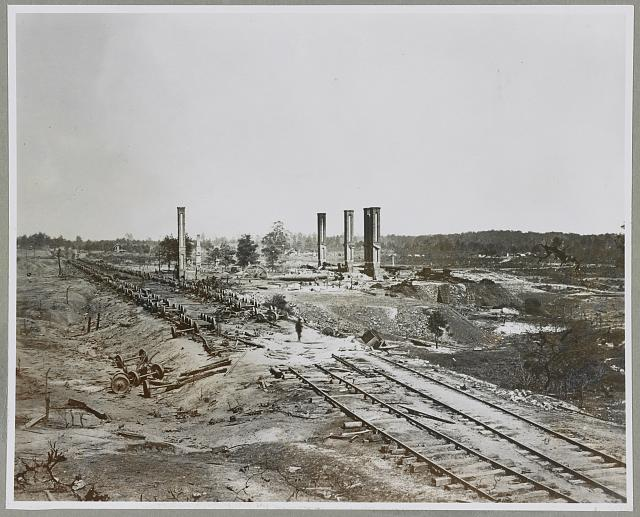
Ruins of Rolling Mill and cars destroyed by rebels on evacuation of Atlanta

With all of his supply lines cut, General Hood abandoned Atlanta. On the night of September 1, his troops marched out of the city to Lovejoy, Georgia. General Hood ordered that the 81 rail cars filled with ammunition and other military supplies be destroyed. The resulting fire and explosions were heard for miles. In his Official Report, General Sherman stated:

... About 2 o'clock that night the sounds of heavy explosions were heard in the direction of Atlanta, distant about twenty miles, with a succession of minor explosions and what seemed like the rapid firing of cannon and musketry. These continued about an hour, and again about 4 a.m. occurred another series of similar discharges apparently nearer us, and these sounds could be accounted for on no other hypothesis than of a night attack on Atlanta by General Slocum or the blowing up of the enemy s magazines. Nevertheless at daybreak, on finding the enemy gone from his lines at Jonesborough, I ordered a general pursuit south, General Thomas following to the left of the railroad, General Howard on its right, and General Schofield keeping off about two miles to the east. We overtook the enemy again near Lovejoy's Station in a strong intrenched position, with his flanks well protected behind a branch of Walnut Creek to the right and a confluent of the Flint River to his left. We pushed close up and reconnoitered the ground and found he had evidently halted to cover his communication with the McDonough and Fayetteville road.

— William T. Sherman, Official Report of the Atlanta Campaign

On September 2, Major General Slocum, in command of the XX Corp near the Chattahoochee River, sent reconnaissance parties towards Atlanta. Mayor James M. Calhoun and several prominent citizens rode out Marietta St. under a flag of truce to surrender the city of Atlanta to the Union Army. The mayor encountered Col. John Coburn and formally surrendered the city to him. When General Slocum received word that the Confederates had evacuated Atlanta, he moved forward seven brigades to occupy Atlanta.

... On the 2d of September, at 6 a. m., under orders from Brigadier-General Ward, I marched on a reconnaissance from Turners Ferry to find the position of the enemy toward Atlanta. I had under my command 900 infantry, composed of 500 men of my brigade, commanded by Captain Crawford, Eighty-fifth Indiana; Captain Baldwin, Nineteenth Michigan; Captain May, Twenty-second Wisconsin, and Lieutenant Freeland, Thirty-third Indiana, and 400 of the Third Brigade, under command of Major Wickham, Fifty-fifth Ohio, together with 40 mounted men under Captain Scott, Seventieth Indiana. Two hundred and forty men were thrown forward as skirmishers and flankers, and so advanced without opposition until we reached the earth-works recently abandoned by us near Atlanta. Here, after a short delay, occasioned by a slight skirmish with a few mounted men and sentinels, we proceeded through the lines of the enemy's works, finding them abandoned. A brigade of the enemy's cavalry was found to be in the city and we advanced cautiously. I was met in the suburbs by Mr. Calhoun, the mayor, with a committee of citizens bearing a flag of truce. He surrendered the city to me, saying he only asked protection for persons and property. This was at 11 a. m. I asked him if the rebel cavalry was yet in the city. He replied that Ferguson's brigade was there, but on the point of leaving. I replied that my force was moving into the city and that unless that force retired there would be a fight in which neither person nor property would be safe, and that if necessary I would burn the houses of citizens to dislodge the enemy; that I did not otherwise intend to injure persons or property of the citizens unless used against us. I ordered my skirmishers to advance, and they proceeded through the city, the cavalry rapidly evacuating the place. I at once sent dispatches to Brigadier-General Ward, at Turners Ferry, and to Major-General Slocum, at the railroad bridge, of the occupation of the city by my command. General Slocum came at once to the city. Immediately preceding him came a portion of the First and Second Divisions of the Twentieth Corps. General Ward directed a portion of my brigade to move up from Turners Ferry, under command of Lieutenant-Colonel Bloodgood, Twenty-second Wisconsin, which reached Atlanta about sunset, and the remainder, under Major Miller, the next morning. Soon after General Slocum's arrival he directed me to move my command, which then occupied the works of the enemy on the southeastern part of the city, to the right of the Augusta railroad. This was done, and General Knipe's brigade was posted on the left of the road in single line, deployed at intervals of three paces. Here the brigade has remained in camp until this date. The command captured 123 prisoners, including those in hospital. Some 200 small-arms were found in the City Hall, and about 16 pieces of artillery abandoned in the works and burned with the train of cars. The ammunition abandoned had been fired in the night and continued to explode with loud reports after we had entered the city in the forts and among the ruins of the burning shops and buildings where it had been deposited. The works of the enemy were left almost perfect, and there seemed to have been no attempt at destruction of anything but of the material of war. As we passed through the streets many of the citizens ran gladly out to meet us, welcoming us as deliverers from the despotism of the Confederacy; others regarded us with apprehension and begged to be spared from robbery. I assured them they would be safe from this. Many of the buildings were found to be much injured by our artillery, but such as will be needed for public use can be taken at once with slight repairs. My command on the reconnaissance behaved with remarkable promptness and energy, and deserved to be first, as they were, of our army to enter the city. The losses in this time are 5 killed and 22 wounded. I am, sir, very respectfully, your obedient servant

J. COBURN, Colonel, Commanding Brigade.

Capt. JOHN SPEED, Assistant Adjutant-General

— Col. John Coburn, OR 261, Vol. 38, part 2, Reports, etc.

== Occupation of Atlanta (September 3 – November 16, 1864) ==
On September 3, General Sherman was with the bulk of his troops near Lovejoy's Station when he received word from Gen. Henry W. Slocum that the Confederates had withdrawn from Atlanta. He immediately ordered Slocum to take possession of Atlanta and to advise all people that he intended to have all civilians leave the city.

When General Sherman decided not to pursue the Confederate forces commanded by General Hood on September 4, 1864, he issued Special Field Orders No. 64. The Army of the Cumberland commanded by Maj. Gen. Thomas was to move to Atlanta. The Army of the Tennessee commanded by Maj. Gen. Howard was to move to East Point and the head of Camp Creek, while the Army of the Ohio, commanded by Maj. Gen. Schofield, moved to Decatur.

On Sept. 7, General Sherman established his headquarters in the two and one-half-story home of John Neal (1796–1886) located on Washington St. After the Federal troops left Atlanta, it was noted that Sherman had left the "Neal house in excellent condition with the furniture stored in the parlor and disturbed but little".

General George Thomas made his headquarters in the Greek revival home of William Herrington and his son-in-law Austin Leyden. The house was located on the west side of Peachtree Street between Ellis and Cain Streets. In the 20th century, this lot would be occupied by a department store.

Other homes used by the Federal Offices where:

- Brig. Gen. John W. Geary, the home of Edward E. Rawson
- Maj. Gen. David S. Stanley, the home of Lewis Scofield
- Maj. Gen. Henry W. Slocum, the home of William H. Dabney
- Col. William Gates LeDuc, Home of the Mayor, James Calhoun

On September 8, Sherman reported to Maj. Gen. H. W. Halleck that his "whole Army" was encamped around Atlanta. He reported that Gen. Howard was in Atlanta and that Gen. Scofield was in Decatur. At the time of his report to Halleck, he had not heard from Gen. Howard, but he assumed he was in East Point. He promised his troops rest and pay.

The federal forces occupied Atlanta until November 15/16 when they began their "March to the Sea". During this approximately 73 days, General Sherman and his troops would not only keep an eye on Gen. Hood and the Confederate army, but evacuate all civilians from Atlanta, build their own shelters, construct fortifications, forage for fresh food, some would get a furloughs to visit home, and finally destroy all assets of military value in Atlanta.

=== Evacuation of all civilians (September 8–21, 1864) ===
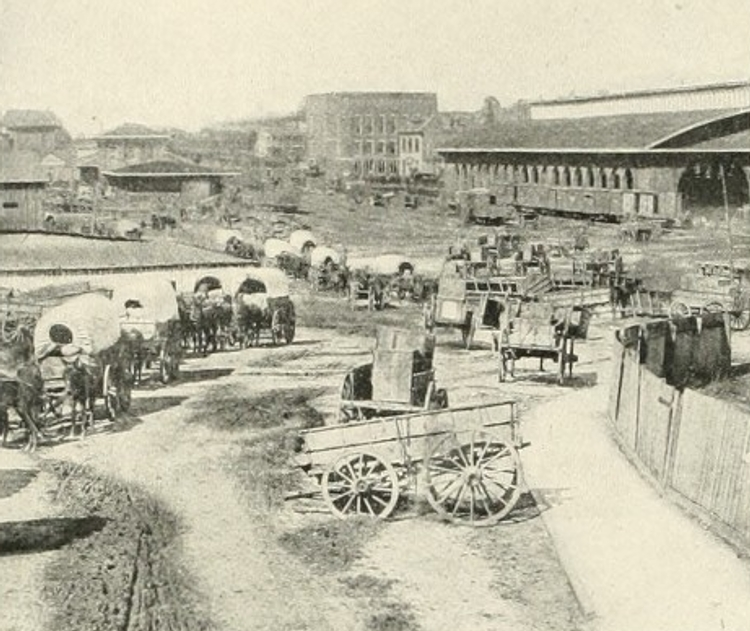
Civilians of Atlanta scramble to board the last train to leave under the mandatory evacuation order. Many wagons and belongings had to be abandoned.

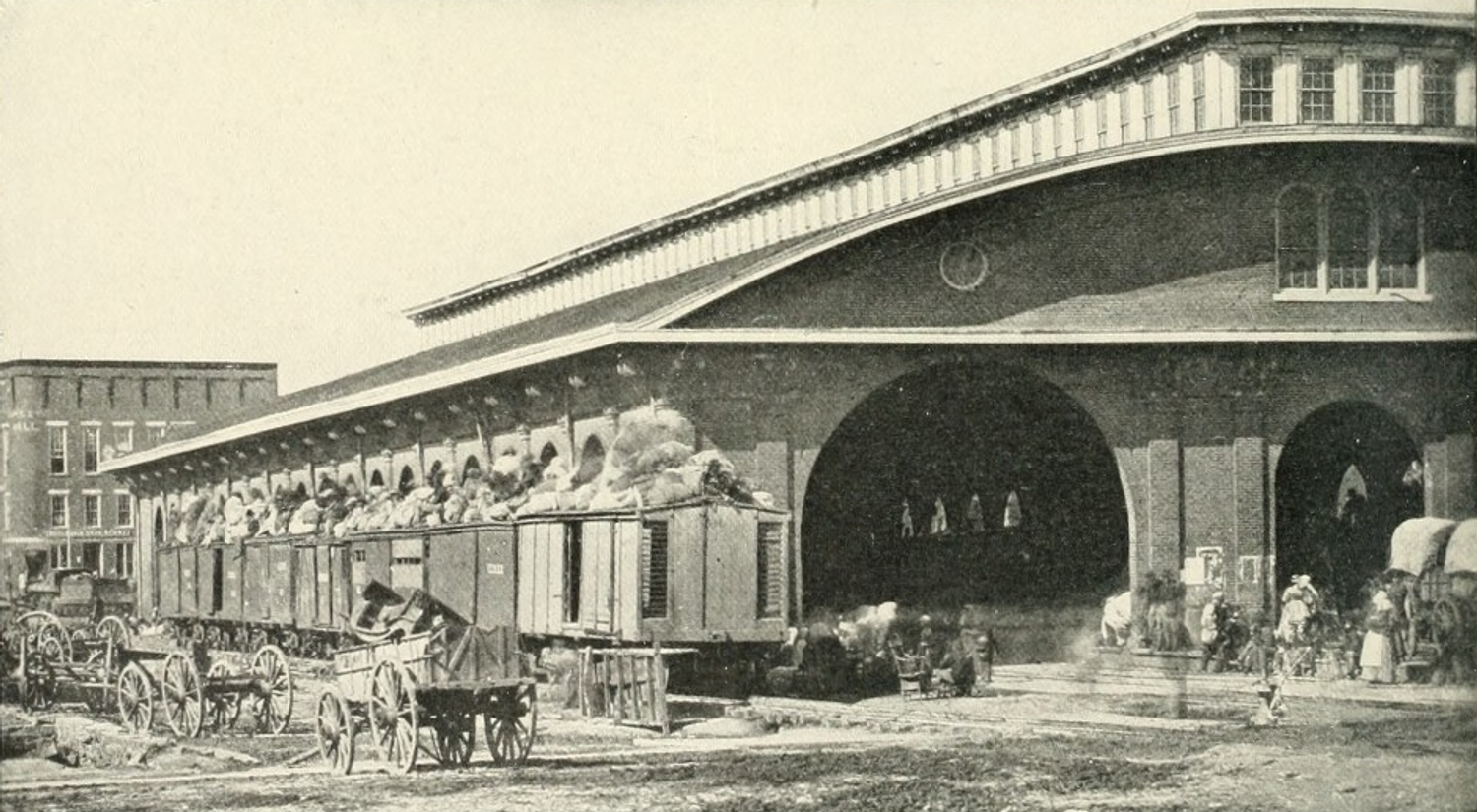
General Sherman's mandatory evacuation order led to this photograph of the last train leaving Atlanta. With overloaded cars, it will not have enough room for civilians to bring all of their belongings which can be seen littered beside the tracks beside the wagons they left behind and the two chests.

On September 5, the commander of the Provost Guard of Atlanta, Col. William Cogswell, issued the following order: "All families now living in Atlanta, the male representatives of which are in the service of the Confederate states, or who have gone south, would leave the city within five days. They will pass the lines and go South". The next day, Lt. Col. C. F. Morse, the provost marshal instructed that the population was to assemble at the City Hall for registration on September 12. Those planning to go South were permitted to take wearing apparel, a limited amount of furniture and a small quantity of food. When General Sherman informed General Hood of his intent to evacuate all the citizens from Atlanta, a series of heated letters were exchanged between the two generals. Mayor Calhoun also appealed to Sherman to relent, but to no avail.

On September 8, 1864, General Sherman issued special order No 67, "The city of Atlanta, being exclusively required for warlike purposes, will at once be vacated by all except the armies of the United States". The order also instructs the chief engineer to survey the city for the permanent defense and to mark all structures that stand in his way to be set apart for destruction. The order also prohibited soldiers from occupying any house. The order allowed soldiers to "use boards, shingles, or materials of buildings, barns, sheds, warehouses, and shanties" to build their own quarters.

On September 8, the mayor of Atlanta, James M. Calhoun, notified its citizens that they would have to evacuate the city. Each citizen was required to register with Lt. Col. LeDuc the number of adults, children, servants and a count of the number of packages or parcels they were taking with them.

NOTICE,

ATLANTA, GA., September 8, 1864.
To the Citizens of Atlanta:

Major-General Sherman instructs me to say to you that you must all leave Atlanta; that as many of you as want to go North can do so, and that as many as want to go South can do so, and that all can take with them their movable property, servants included, if they want to go, but that no force is to be used, and that he will furnish transportation for persons and property as far as Rough and Ready, from whence it is expected General Hood will assist in carrying it on. Like transportation will be furnished for people and property going North, and it is required that all things contemplated by this notice will be carried into execution as soon as possible.

All persons are requested to leave their names and number in their families with the undersigned as early as possible, that estimates may be made of the quantity of transportation required.
JAMES M. CALHOUN

Mayor

— James M. Calhoun, Notice to the Citizens of Atlanta

Lieut. Col. LeDuc sat behind a table on the porch of Richard Peters house at Mitchell and Forsyth Streets. He began registering and issuing travel permits to the citizens that were evacuating Atlanta to the South. Between September 10 and September 20, Col. LeDuc registered 1,651 individuals. There were 705 adults, 860 children and 86 servants. Together they all they carried 8,842 packages of baggage.

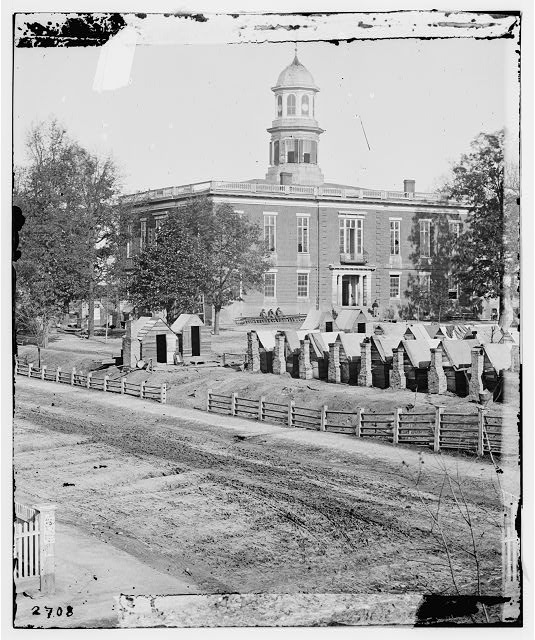
Camp of 2d Massachusetts Infantry on the grounds of the Atlanta, Ga. City Hall

=== Building the inner defensive ring (October 3 – November 1, 1864) ===
Gen. Sherman's Special Field Orders No. 67, section 3, ordered the chief engineer, Capt. Orlando M. Poe to construct new defensive works around Atlanta. Capt. Poe first evaluated the existing Confederate fortifications. Finding them too extensive for the number of troops planned to garrison Atlanta, Capt. Poe designed a new set of fortifications. The new line was less than three miles in length along a system of heights nearer the center of town. This new line passed through the northern part of town rendering the destruction of a great many buildings necessary. Gen. Sherman approved of the plan but instructed Capt. Poe not to begin construction.

On September 18, 1864, the confederate forces, commanded by Gen. John B. Hood, began moving from their position near Lovejoy Station, GA, and crossed to the west side of the Chattahoochee River on September 29. Gen. Sherman began moving five of his Army Corps (the IV, XIV, XV, XVII and the XXIII Corps) to try to defeat the Confederates in the field. The XX Corps, commanded by Gen. Slocum, was left in Atlanta to guard the city. With only one corps remaining in Atlanta Gen. Sherman instructed Capt. Poe to begin the construction of the new inner defense line.

Capt. Poe and his Engineering detachment began constructing the new fortifications on October 3, 1864. During the first week, he was assisted by 2,000 soldiers of the XX Corps. On October 5, Capt. Poe reported to Gen. Sherman that they had completed positions for thirty guns. Work continued until November 1 with a much smaller work force until preparations for the March to the Sea began.

=== Destruction of military assets (November 7–16, 1864) ===
Gen. Sherman realized that the occupation of Atlanta would tie up substantial manpower resources, so he devised a plan to abandon Atlanta. The plan called for the destruction of all military assets within the city, the reorganization of the forces under his command and for reinforcing Gen. George Thomas in Tennessee. Once these preparations were completed, he and his troops would set out on a campaign designed to destroy the state of Georgia's war-making capabilities and the will of its population to continue the war.

On October 19, 1864, General Sherman notified Maj. Gen. H. W. Halleck that he "now consider myself authorized to execute my plan to destroy the railroad from Chattanooga to Atlanta, including the latter city (modified by General Grant from Dalton, & c.), strike out into the heart of Georgia, and make for Charleston, Savannah, or the mouth of the Apalachicola". On that same day, he notified Col. Amos Beckwith in Atlanta that "Hood will escape me. I want to prepare for my big raid. On the 1st of November I want nothing but what is necessary to war. Send all trash to the rear at once and have on hand thirty days food and but little forage. I propose to abandon Atlanta and the railroad back to Chattanooga, and sally forth to ruin Georgia and bring up on the seashore. Make all dispositions accordingly. I will go down the Coosa until sure that Hood has gone to Blue Mountain." Additionally, he notified Col. L. C. Easton in Chattanooga, "Go in person to superintend the repairs of the railroad, and make all orders in my name that will expedite its completion. I want it finished to bring back to Chattanooga the sick, wounded, and surplus trash. On the 1st of November I want nothing in front of Chattanooga save what we can use as food and clothing and haul in our wagons. There is plenty of corn in the country, and we only want forage for the posts. I allow ten days to do all this, by which time I expect to be near Atlanta."

On October 20, 1864, General Sherman informed Major-General Thomas of his planned March to the Sea. Part of his plan was to insure that Gen. Thomas had sufficient strength to hold Tennessee, or if Hood followed Sherman into Georgia, Gen. Thomas was instructed to move south as far as Columbus, Miss., and Selma. General Stanley, with the IV Corps, was assigned to Gen. Thomas.

General Sherman instructed Col. Cogswell and Capt. Poe to develop plans for the destruction of Atlanta as a transportation hub and as a war material manufacturing center. In late October Col. Cogswell ordered his officers in the three provost regiments to begin planning the demolition of designated buildings and areas of the city assigned to them and the railroad. The plan of destruction was to include the buildings to be destroyed, the method and manpower needed and time estimates to complete the work. The 33rd Massachusetts was to destroy the area around Whitehall and Peachtree. The 2nd Massachusetts was assigned the Car Shed and structures to its east while the 111th Pennsylvania would target things to the Northwest including the Western and Atlantic roundhouse and gasworks. In addition to these troops, four regiments of the XXIII Corps would tear up railroad tracks in the city. The plan of destruction as drawn up by Col. Cogswell and his provost marshals did not include any private homes. On November 7, Gen. Sherman sent instruction to Capt. Poe to:

Hdqrs. Military Division of the Mississippi
In the field, Kingston, Ga., November 7, 1864.

Capt. O. M. POE, Atlanta, Ga:
I want you to take special charge of the destruction in Atlanta of all depots, car-houses, shops, factories, foundries, & c., being careful to knock down all furnace chimneys, and break down their arches; fire will do most of the work. Call on General Slocum for details and be all ready by the 10th. Beauregard still lingers about Florence, afraid to invade Tennessee, and I think slightly disgusted because Sherman did not follow him on his fool's errand.

W. T. SHERMAN,

Major-General

On Nov. 7, 1864, General Sherman sent a message to Maj-Gen. Slocum in Atlanta telling him that "All houses used for storage along the railroad are to be destroyed". In a second correspondence, Gen. Sherman told Gen. Slocum that Capt. Poe would be in charge of the destruction of Atlanta's military assets. On Nov. 10, Gen.l Corse to move from Rome, GA, to Atlanta, Gen. Davis was to begin moving from the area of Kinston, GA, towards Atlanta on Nov. 12. General Corse was ordered to "destroy to-night all public property not needed by your command, all foundries, mills, workshops, warehouses, railroad depots, or other store-houses convenient to the railroad, together with all wagon-shops, tanneries, or other factories useful to our enemy. Destroy the bridges completely, and then move your command to-morrow to Kingston and beyond, passing General Davis command," (Note: For a transcript of this order see: Sherman: Special Order 115 (O.R. 39, part 3, p 627). In response to the order from Sherman, General Corse issued General Order 17 (O.R. 39, part 3, pp 729–30).) On Nov. 11, 1864, Capt. Poe, in Atlanta, received instructions from Gen. Sherman, "You may commence the work of destruction at once, but don't use fire until toward the last moment."

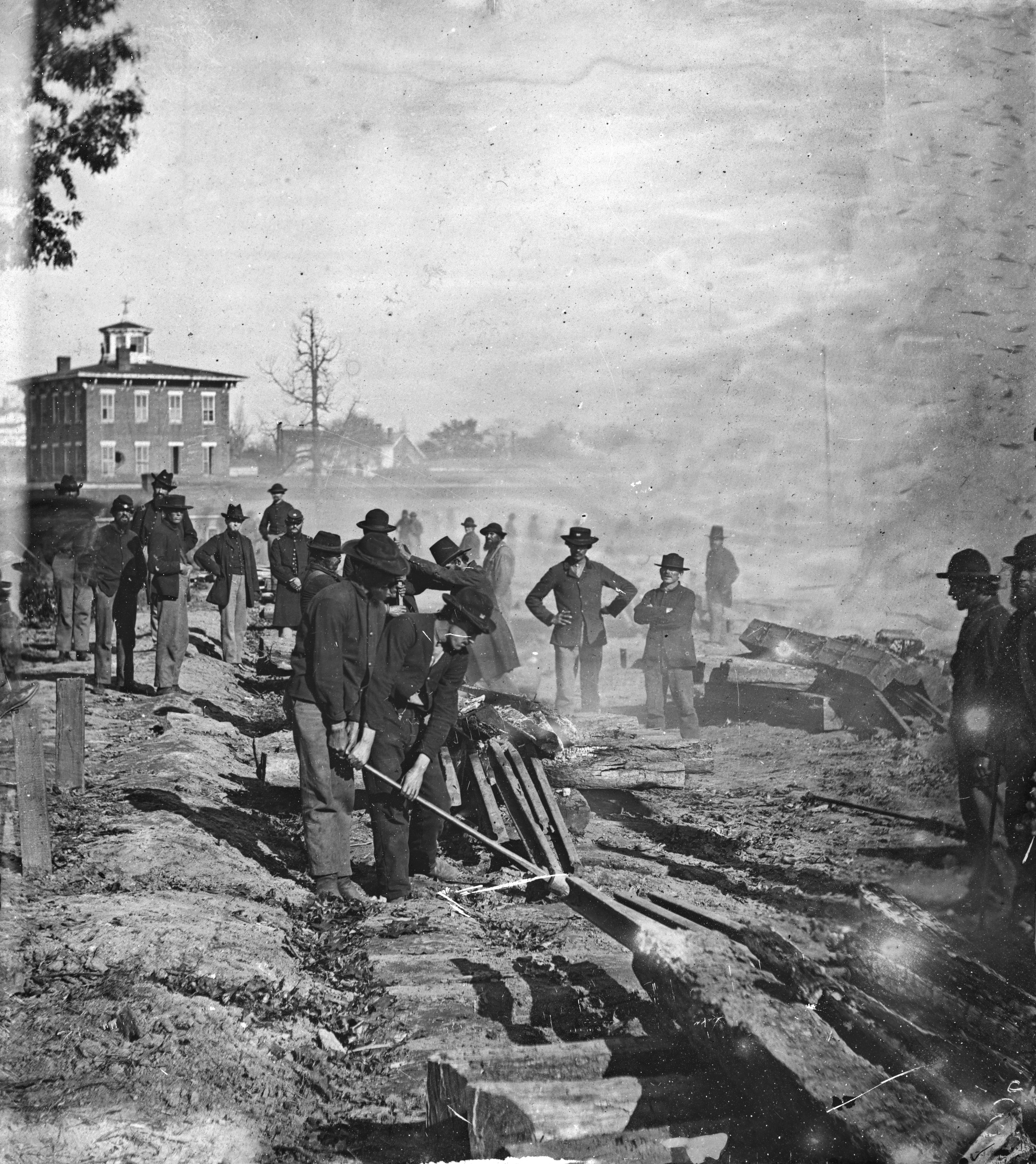
Sherman's army destroying rail infrastructure in Atlanta, 1864

The work of destroying Atlanta's military assets began under the direction of the Chief Engineer, Capt. Poe, on Nov 12, and would continue until the evening of November 15, 1864. In his official report, Captain Poe states:

The engineer regiments were divided into detachments, under picked officers, each of whom received a written order as follows:

You will please take the detachment now under your orders to the first high chimney (stating locality and building) and throw it down, and continue to work along (stating the route) until you reach (the point designated as the limit of work for this detachment), being careful not to use fire in doing the work, since it would endanger buildings which it is not intended to destroy.

These orders were faithfully carried out, and neither fire nor power were used for destroying buildings until after they had been put in ruins by battering down the walls, throwing down smokestacks, breaking up furnace arches, knocking steam machinery to pieces, and punching all boilers full of holes. The railroads within the limits of the old rebel defenses were destroyed by tearing up the rail, piling up the ties, and after putting the rails across them firing the wood which heated the iron and then the rails were twisted. The rails were torn up by using a small but very strong iron "cant hook", devised by myself, and after they were heated were twisted by applying the same hooks at each end of each rail in twisting the iron bar around its horizontal axis, being careful to give the rail at least a half turn. The length of railroad destroyed in this manner, within the limits indicated above, was about ten miles. The depot, car sheds, machine shops, and water tanks were also destroyed.

It was not until the evening of the 15th of November that fire was applied to the heaps of rubbish we had made. I was upon the ground in person to see that the work was done in a proper and orderly manner; and, as far as engineer troops were concerned, this was the case. But many buildings in the business part of the city were destroyed by lawless persons, who, by sneaking around in blind alleys, succeeded in firing many houses which it was not intended to torch.

— Capt. Orlando M. Poe, O.R. Series 1, Volume 44, OR# 4, page 60

Gen. Sherman returned to the city on Nov. 14. In his memoirs, he recalls:

... I reached Atlanta during the afternoon of the 14th, and found that all preparations had been made-Colonel Beckwith, chief commissary, reporting one million two hundred thousand rations in possession of the troops, which was about twenty days' supply, and he had on hand a good supply of beef-cattle to be driven along on the hoof. Of forage, the supply was limited, being of oats and corn enough for five days, but I knew that within that time we would reach a country well stocked with corn, which had been gathered and stored in cribs, seemingly for our use, by Governor Brown's militia. Colonel Poe (Note: Captain Poe was promoted after the March to the Sea during the Carolina's campaign. After the war during President Grant's administration General Sherman severed as the General of the Army. Colonel Poe served as one of General Shaman's aid-de-camps.), United States Engineers, of my staff, had been busy in his special task of destruction. He had a large force at work, had leveled the great depot, round house, and the machine-shops of the Georgia Railroad, and had applied fire to the wreck. One of these machine-shops had been used by the rebels as an arsenal, and in it were stored piles of shot and shell, some of which proved to be loaded, and that night was made hideous by the bursting of shells, whose fragments came uncomfortably, near Judge Lyon's house, in which I was quartered. The fire also reached the block of stores near the depot, and the heart of the city was in flames all night, but the fire did not reach the parts of Atlanta where the court-house was, or the great mass of dwelling houses.

— William T. Sherman, Memoirs of General W.T. Sherman, Chapter 21

After a plea by Father Thomas O'Reilly of the Immaculate Conception Catholic Church, Sherman did not burn the city's churches or hospitals. However, the remaining war resources were then destroyed in Atlanta and in Sherman's March to the Sea. One of the major buildings that was destroyed was Edward A. Vincent's railroad depot, built in 1853. In his diary, Capt. Poe would bemoan the "destruction of private property" that occurred.

=== Sherman's march to the sea begins (November 15–16, 1864) ===
On November 15, the work of destroying the military assets continued in downtown under Capt. Poe, while the bulk of the Union forces began their "March to the Sea". The Union forces now consisted of approximately 60,000 men divided into two wings; each wing comprised two Corps. The right wing under Maj. Gen. Oliver O. Howard took the McDonough Road (later Capital Ave.) following the Macon & Western Railroad towards Jonesboro while the left wing, commanded by Maj. Gen. Henry W. Slocum, took Decatur Street along the Georgia Railroad towards Decatur and Stone Mountain.

The XVII Corps, commanded by Major General Frank P. Blair Jr, marched south along the McDonough road, and moved, via McDonough and Jackson, to the Ocmulgee River, at Planters Factory. The XV Corps, commanded by Major General Peter J. Osterhaus, followed the XVII Corps on the McDonough Road.

The, 4th Division of the XV Corps was north of Atlanta and "by consecutive marches passed through Kingston, Allatoona, and Marietta, and arrived at Atlanta on the morning of the 15th [November] just as the Fifteenth Corps debouched from the town. Twenty days' supplies were loaded on the trains, and the command moved to overtake the corps, and encamped near East Point on the night of the 15th". The XV Corps arrived in the vicinity of McDonough on the 16th.

The XX Corps, commanded by Brig. Gen. Alpheus S. Williams, took Decatur Street following the Georgia Railroad through Decatur and past Stone Mountain. Their destination was Lithonia. The corps camped near the Georgia railroad, south of Stone Mountain on the evening of the 15th and near Rock Bridge Post-Office on the 16th.

The XIV Corps, commanded by Bvt. Maj. Gen. Jefferson C. Davis, having been north of Atlanta in Rome, reached Atlanta on the morning of November 15. The corps bivouacked in the suburbs of the city. The remainder of the day and night was spent in issuing clothing to the men, filling up empty wagons with provisions, equalizing and assigning trains to the different commands with a view to rapid marching. The XIV Corps left Atlanta on the 16th, taking the Decatur Rd, passed through Decatur and then moved to Covington.

As Gen. Sherman departed Atlanta at 7:00 a.m. on Nov. 16 with the army, he noted his handiwork:

... We rode out of Atlanta by the Decatur road, filled by the marching troops and wagons of the Fourteenth Corps; and reaching the hill, just outside of the old rebel works, we naturally paused to look back upon the scenes of our past battles. We stood upon the very ground whereon was fought the bloody battle of July 22d, and could see the copse of wood where McPherson fell. Behind us lay Atlanta, smoldering and in ruins, the black smoke rising high in air, and hanging like a pall over the ruined city.

— William T. Sherman, Memoirs of General W.T. Sherman, Chapter 21

== Atlantans return (November 17, 1864 – May 4, 1865) ==
After the Union forces left Atlanta, one of the first Atlantans to return was Zachary Rice. On Nov. 20, 1864, Mr. Rice reported that, "there is not a house standing on Whitehall Street from Rowark's corner to Wesley Chapel on Peachtree Street and on Marietta from the street running from the Baptist church ..." He goes on to report that:

"all the houses on Marietta Street are burned except a short space from Dr. Powell's to Robinson's house, opposite the state depot. Except Norcross's mills, L. Dean's and B. O. Jones's, no houses are burned on Peachtree Street, beyond Wesley Chapel. Inman's, Holbrook's, Landale's, and Nox buildings are burned. Colonel Glenn and Rawson's dwellings are not burn..."

Mr. Rice reports that all of the churches near City Hall were saved but that the new Episcopal and Pain's churches were destroyed.

In a letter to his wife, dated Dec. 1, 1864, James R. Crew, Mayor Calhoun's emissary to Gen. Sherman wrote,

"You have heard before this that the Federals have burned and evacuated Atlanta, but for information to the refugees and the exiles who have been driven from their homes, allow me to trouble you with a few lines, as all will be anxious to know whether their homes have been spared by the vandal hands."

He also notes that many private homes were destroyed and that Dr. Quintard's "Rebel" chapel had been destroyed. Mr. Crew estimates that two-thirds of the city had been destroyed.

On Nov. 26, 1864, the commander of the Georgia state troops, Gen. Howell Cobb, appointed Col. Luther J. Glenn as the commander of the post of Atlanta. On Dec. 5, 1864, Capt. Thomas L. Dodd was appointed as the Atlanta Provost-Marshal. On Nov. 25, 1864, Gov. Joseph E. Brown ordered Gen. W. P. Howard to inspect the State property in Atlanta, and the city itself, and protect the same.

Gen. Howard's report, dated Dec. 7, 1864, details the destruction that he witnessed. His report states that several major buildings were not destroyed, including the City Hall, the Gate City hotel, the Masonic Hall, the Medical College, and several of the churches located downtown. His report also relays to Gov. Brown that "The property of the State was destroyed by fire, yet a vast deal of valuable material remains in the ruins. Three-fourths of the bricks are good and will be suitable for rebuilding if placed under shelter before freezing weather. There is a quantity of brass in the journals of burned cars and in the ruins of the various machinery of the extensive railroad shops; also, a valuable amount of copper from the guttering of the State depot, the flue pipes of destroyed engines, stop cocks of machinery, etc." His report also states that many businesses, private homes, and several churches were destroyed. In addition to the destruction caused by the war, Gen. Howard notes that: "There were about 250 wagons in the city on my arrival, loading with pilfered plunder; pianoes, mirrors, furniture of all kinds, iron, hides without number, and an incalculable amount of other things, very valuable at the present time. This exportation of stolen property had been going on ever since the place had been abandoned by the enemy. Bushwhackers, robbers and deserters, and citizens from the surrounding country for a distance of fifty miles have been engaged in this dirty work."

The destruction of Atlanta was the result of nine major events that began in the summer of 1863 and culminated with the fires set as the Federal troops left the city on Nov 15, 1864. The events are as follows:

1. The construction of the Confederate fortification around Atlanta during the summer of 1863.
2. The Siege of Atlanta and the ensuing bombardment July 20 – August 25, 1864.
3. The Federal demolition of houses behind their lines to the Chattahoochee River for shelter and firewood.
4. Fighting around Atlanta and the destruction of homes by both sides in the no-man's-land between the two armies.
5. Confederate evacuation and destruction of military supplies and the rolling mill, Sept. 1–2, 1864.
6. Occupation of the city and surrounding towns and the building of "shanties" for shelter by the Federal troops.
7. The construction of the inner defensive ring by the Federal troops during October 1864.
8. The authorized destruction of the rail road, factories, warehouses and other military assets, by the Federal troops, Nov 12 – 15, 1864.
9. The unauthorized fires set by the Federal troops Nov. 11–15, 1864.

During the month of Dec. 1864, articles appeared in several newspapers about the destruction of Atlanta. On December 10, 1864, Atlanta Intelligence published a front-only broadside (a one-page newspaper). This broadside emphasized what was still standing rather than what was destroyed in order to encourage the citizens of Atlanta to return to the city and rebuild. The article states: "to our absent citizens we would say return as soon as possible, with one mind commence to extricate ourselves from the ruin detailed upon us ..." In a second article published on Dec. 22, 1864, the paper's editors reported that: "As you reach the city limits, you see the awful effects of one vast extended conflagration. A city destroyed by FIRE! Two-thirds at least devoured by flames. Doomed to utter desolation, one-third of Atlanta still lives. This will be the nucleus, the cornerstone, the foundation upon which the city will again be restored. Of this, more anon." The article goes on to describe, street by street, some of the destruction the editors of the paper witnessed.

On December 21, 1864, the Augusta Chronicle & Sentinel published a letter from a correspondent named "Civis". His letter was dated December 15 and reiterated the amount of damage done to Atlanta during the war. The reporter estimated that "about three fourths of the buildings have been torn down or burned, and about nine-tenths of the property value destroyed".

Throughout the month of December 1864 more and more citizens returned to the city. An article appeared in the December 15, 1864, issue of the Augusta Chronicle & Sentinel. The paper reported that "many of the old citizens are returning, and the general watchword is repair and rebuild". The article states that "Whit Anderson had opened a barroom on Decatur Street where he serves his customers with dignity and grace and Sid Holland a small grocery on Peachtree Street". The article goes on to describe a city rebuilding.

Elections were held with James Calhoun being reelected as Mayor. The city council held its first meeting on Jan. 6, 1865; the city treasury held $1.64. Rev. H. C. Horandy preached a service at the First Baptist Church on Sunday, Dec. 25, 1864. By April, 1865, five churches where holding services.

After the Battle of Bentonville, Gen. Joseph E. Johnston surrendered the Army of Tennessee and all remaining Confederate forces still active in North Carolina, South Carolina, Georgia, and Florida at Bennett Place, NC, on April 26, 1865. On May 4, 1865, Union Col. Beroth B. Eggleston of the First Ohio Cavalry received the surrender of Confederate and state troops in Atlanta from Lt. Col. L. J. Glenn, commander of the post of Atlanta.

== Aftermath ==
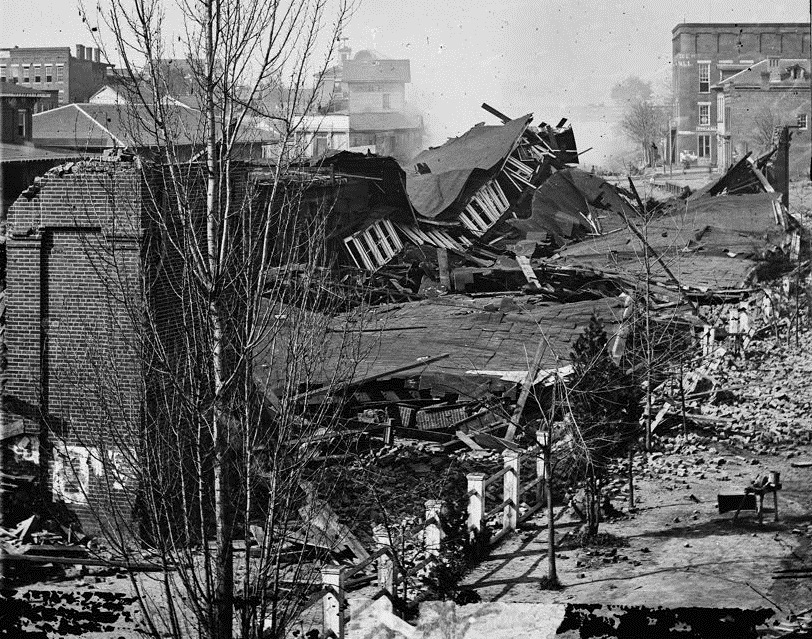
Ruins of Atlanta Union Depot, 1864

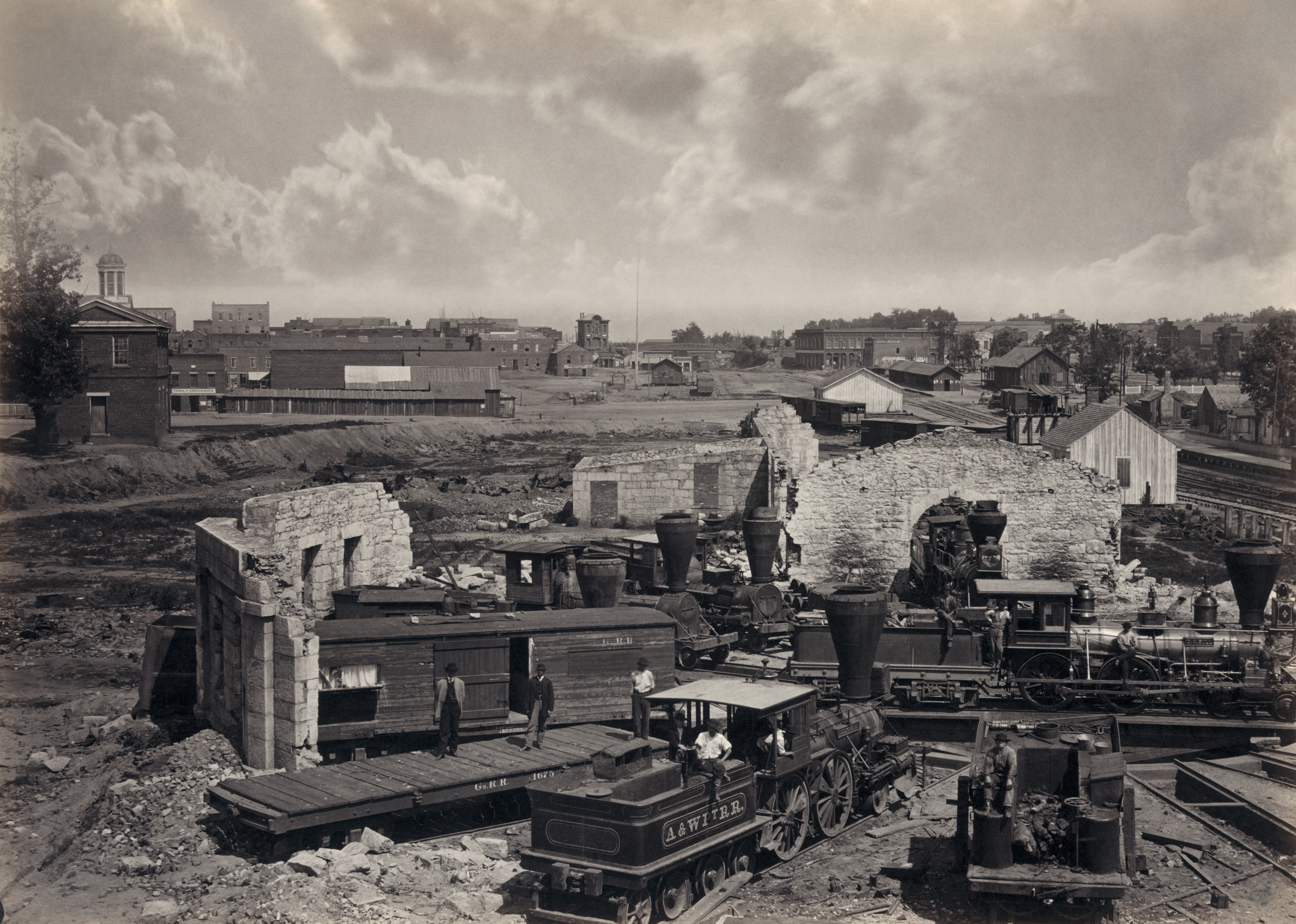
Roundhouse following extensive damage, 1866

The fall of Atlanta was especially noteworthy for its political ramifications. The capture and fall of Atlanta were extensively covered by Northern newspapers, and significantly boosted Northern morale. Lincoln was re-elected easily.

Following the war Federal troops returned to Atlanta to help enforce the provisions of Reconstruction.
