= Fort Marcy (New Mexico) =

Former fort in Santa Fe, New Mexico, United States

Coordinates: 35°41′22″N 105°55′56″W

Fort Marcy was a military reservation in Santa Fe, New Mexico used during the American Civil War and Mexican–American War. It was decommissioned in the 1890s.

== History ==
=== Construction ===
Hired workers and troops assembled the fort, building 9-foot high and 5-foot thick adobe walls to construct the irregular tridecagon structure. Outside of the defense, an adobe blockhouse and powder magazine were established to store artillery and weapons. Fort Marcy was "ample enough to hold 1000 soldiers." No garrisons were inside the actual fort. Limited quarters were located and constructed on the outside mesa. The fort was never required to defend Santa Fe, resulting in the men being headquartered and horses stabled near the old Spanish military establishment, 600 yards from the governor's palace. Kearney named the newly established fort after William L. Marcy, the secretary of war and his boss at the time. Fort Marcy engaged in little action during the American Civil War and became abandoned upon an executive order from President Andrew Johnson on August 28, 1868.

Wood for the construction of the fort was milled at a sawmill built in 1847, later known as the Randall Davey House.

=== Mexican–American War ===
In May 1846, the United States declared war on the Republic of Mexico after a dispute arose over the location of the southern border of the newly annexed State of Texas. Led by General Stephen W. Kearney, his Army of the West, with approximately 1,700 troops, marched into the city of Santa Fe to claim the city and the entire New Mexico Territory on August 18, 1846. On the next day, Kearney ordered two of his chief engineers, William Emory and Jeremy Gilmer, who later served as a major general and chief engineer for the Confederate States Army during the American Civil War, to stake out a good site for a defensive fort. This was crucial in order to prevent an upheaval by the already conquered population. Lt. Emory found the perfect spot in what he called "the only point which commands the entire town." At the location was a summit positioned on a flat-topped hill, 650 yards northeast of Santa Fe's plaza.

=== Demise ===
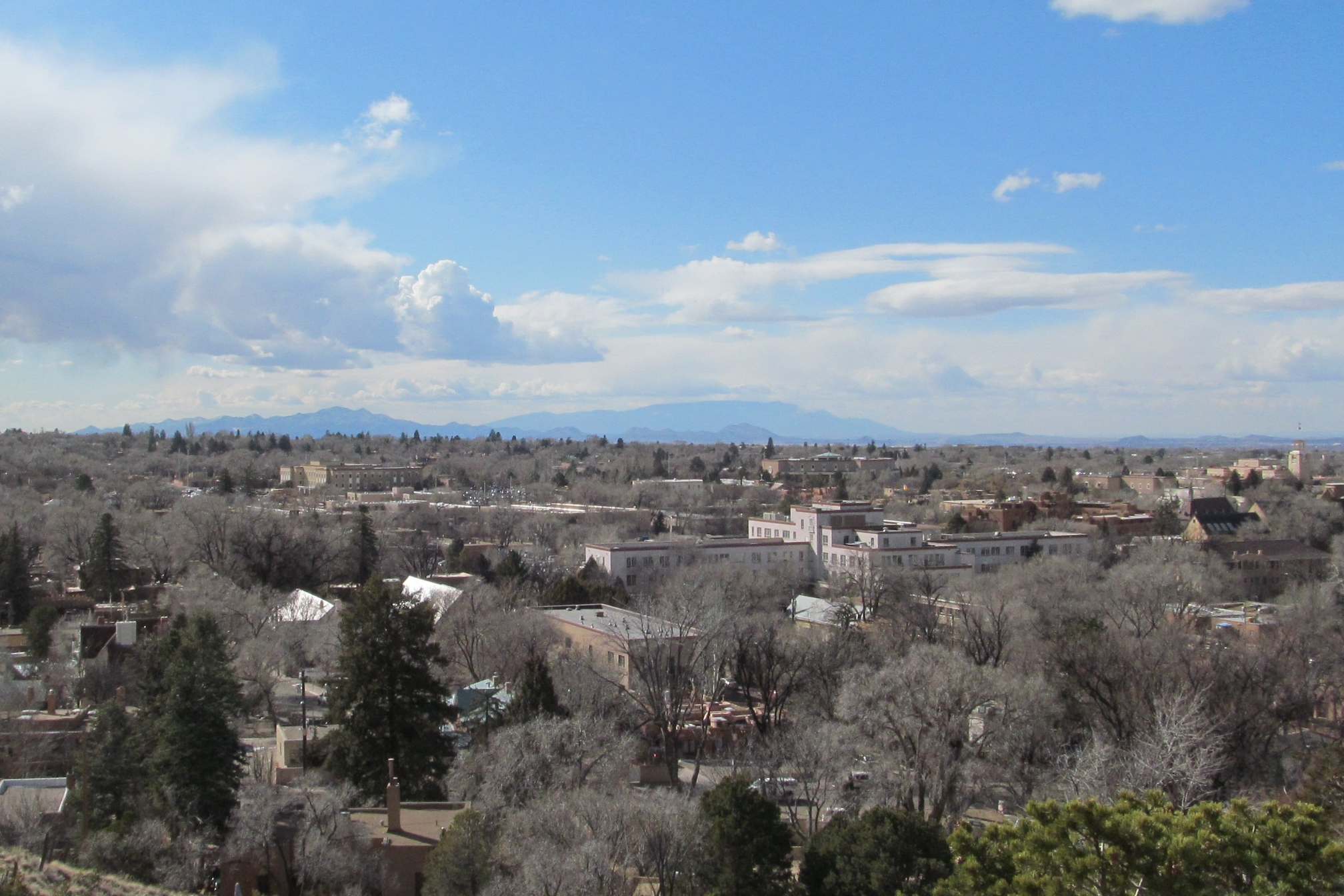
View from Old Fort Marcy Park

In 1887, a Silver City citizen, Tassie Wilson, went to the territorial capital for a visit. During her stay, she and her friends discovered Spanish coins hidden beneath the walls of old Fort Marcy. This incident, first reported by the Silver City Enterprise on September 30, claimed her find to be more than $2,300 worth of coins, the oldest of which dated back to 1740 and 1726 and were donated to the Historical Society of New Mexico. The paper went on to state: "After the discovery was made, large numbers of Santa Fe citizens turned out and dug the whole country up in the vicinity of the fort, but without finding anything new."

The hunt was ultimately the destructive force that ended the remaining standing walls. The government sold the Fort Marcy location at auction in 1891. The city of Santa Fe acquired the site on the hill in 1961, and landscaped it as a scenic overlook of the city.

The Fort Marcy Officer's Residence, built in the early 1870s, also known as the "Edgar Lee Hewett House", survives and is listed on the National Register of Historic Places.

== See also ==
- Jeremy Francis Gilmer
- Santa Fe, New Mexico
