= Special Field Orders No. 67 =

Special Field Orders No. 67 (series 1864) were military orders issued during the American Civil War, on September 14, 1864, by General William Tecumseh Sherman, commander of the Military Division of the Mississippi of the United States Army. The order stated that "The city of Atlanta, being exclusively required for warlike purposes, will at once be vacated by all except the armies of the United States". The order also instructs the chief engineer to survey the city for the permanent defense and to mark all structures that stand in his way to be set apart for destruction. The order also prohibited soldiers from occupying any house. The order allowed soldiers to "use boards, shingles, or materials of buildings, barns, sheds, warehouses, and shanties" to build their own quarters.

== Impact of the Order ==
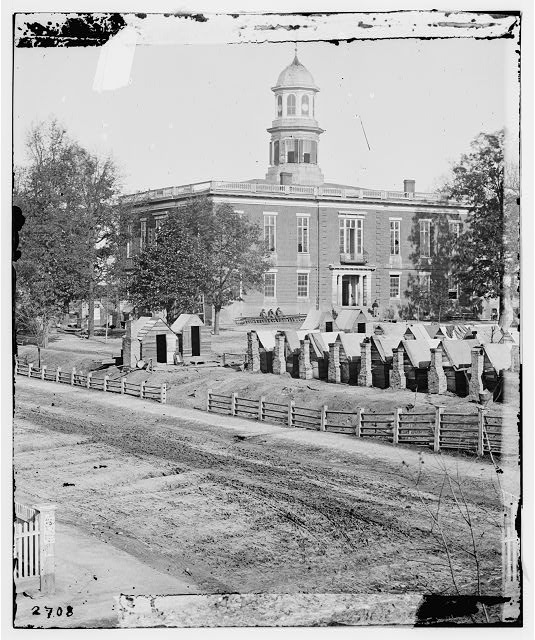
Camp of 2d Massachusetts Infantry on the grounds of the Atlanta, Ga. City Hall.

This order specified that all civilians had to leave Atlanta. Lieut. Col. Le Duc was in charge of issuing travel permits to the citizens that were evacuating Atlanta to the South. Between September 10 and September 20, Col. Le Duc registered 1,651 individuals. There were 705 adults, 860 children and 86 servants. Together they all they carried 8,842 packages of baggage.

Section 3 of the order directed the chief engineer, Capt. Orlando M. Poe to construct new defensive works around Atlanta. In addition to digging trenches and constructing gun emplacements, Poe's men also had to cut down trees and tear down building to make way for the fortifications and to clear lines of fire in case the confederates attacked to recapture the city of Atlanta. One building of note that was taken down was the three-story brick Atlanta Female Institute located on Ellis Street.

Section 4 of the order did not allow the troops to occupy homes within Atlanta. In accordance with this order the troops constructed their own lodgings for their stay. They obtained building material by tearing up fences, homes, and even removing the bricks from chimneys. The order applied to all federal troops south of Chattanooga (section 6). This resulted in troops in towns other than Atlanta deconstructing private home to build shelters for themselves.

== Orders ==
Special Field Orders No. 67.

Headquarters department of the Mississippi,
In the field, Atlanta Ga.
September 8, 1864.

1. The city of Atlanta, being exclusively required for warlike purposes, will at once be vacated by all except the armies of the United States and such civilian employs as may be retained by the proper departments of government.
2. The chief quartermaster, Colonel Easton, will at once take possession of buildings of all kinds, and of all staple articles, such as cotton, tobacco, & c., and will make such disposition of them as is required by existing regulations, or such orders as he may receive from time to time from the proper authorities.
3. The chief engineer will promptly reconnoiter the city and suburbs, and indicate the sites needed for the permanent defense of the place, together with any houses, sheds, or shanties that stand in his way, that they may be set apart for destruction. Colonel Easton will then, on con siltation with the proper officers of the ordnance, quartermaster, commissary, medical, and railroad departments, set aside such buildings and lots of ground as will be needed for them, and have them suitably marked and set apart. He will then, on consultation with Generals Thomas and Slocum, set apart such as may be necessary to the proper administration of the military duties of the Department of the Cumberland and of the post of Atlanta, and all buildings and materials not thus embraced will be held subject to the use of the Government as may hereafter arise, according to the just rules of the quartermasters department.
4. No general, staff, or other officers, or any soldier will on any pretense occupy any house or shanty, unless it be embraced in the limits assigned as the camp of the troops to which such general or staff belongs, but the chief quartermaster may allow the troops to use boards, shingles, or materials of buildings, barns, sheds, warehouses, and shanties, not needed by the proper departments of government, to be used in the reconstruction of such shanties and bivouacs as the troops and officers serving with them require, and he will also provide as early as practicable the proper allowance of tents for the use of the officers and men in their encampments.
5. In proper time just arrangements will be made for the supply to the troops of all articles they may need over and above the clothing, provisions, & c., furnished by Government, and no pretense whatever will traders, manufacturers, or sutler be allowed to settle in the limits of fortified places, and if these manage to come in spite of this notice, the quartermaster will seize their stores and appropriate them to the use of the troops, and deliver the parties or other unauthorized citizens who thus place their individual interests above that of the United States, in the hands of the provost-marshal, to be put to labor on the forts or conscripted into one of the regiments or batteries already in service.
6. The same general principles will apply to all military posts south of Chattanooga.

By Order of Maj. Gen. W. T. Sherman:

L. M. DAYTON, Aide-de-camp.

— William T. Sherman, O.R. Series 1 - Volume 38 (Part V) p 837-838

== Publication in the Official Record ==
This order is part of the Official Records of the American Civil War. It can be found in Series I — Military Operations, Volume XXXVI, Part V, Page 308. The volume was published in 1891.

== See also ==
- Atlanta campaign
- Atlanta in the American Civil War
