= Special Field Orders No. 64 =

Special Field Orders No. 64 (series 1864) were military orders issued during the American Civil War, on September 4, 1864, by General William Tecumseh Sherman, commander of the Military Division of the Mississippi of the United States Army, and was issued during the Atlanta campaign after learning that the Confederate forces commanded by Lieut. Gen. John B. Hood had evacuated Atlanta on Sept. 1, 1864.

This order signaled the end of the Atlanta campaign that began with the Battle of Rocky Face Ridge fought May 7–13, 1864, north of Dalton, Georgia. This order detailed the occupation of Atlanta and the country near the city. The Army of the Cumberland was to occupy Atlanta. The Army of the Tennessee was to occupy East Point and the head of Camp Creek. The Army of the Ohio was to occupy Decatur. General Sherman announced to his troops:

The army having accomplished its undertaking in the complete reduction and occupation of Atlanta will occupy the place and the country near it until a new campaign is planned in concert with the other grand armies of the United States. ...

— William T. Sherman, Official Report of the Atlanta Campaign

By Sept. 8, Gen. Sherman reported to Maj. Gen. H. W. Halleck that his “whole Army” was encamped around Atlanta. Gen. Sherman promised his troops rest and pay. Thus began the occupation of Atlanta. During their stay in Atlanta, the troops would build their own quarters, evacuate most of the civilian population, rest, replace worn out equipment, reorganize, and make preparations for their next campaign. When Sherman’s troops began their March to the Sea on November 15, all assets of military value in Atlanta would be destroyed.

== Orders ==
Special Field Orders No. 64.

In the Field, near Lovejoys, September 4, 1864.

The army having accomplished its undertaking in the complete reduction and occupation of Atlanta will occupy the place and the country near it until a new campaign is planned in concert with the other grand armies of the United States.

1. The Army of the Cumberland will occupy the city and its communications with Chattanooga, the Army of the Tennessee will occupy East Point and the right flank, and the Army of the Ohio the town of Decatur and the left flank; the cavalry will occupy Sandtown, Roswell, and other points on the flanks and along our line of communication.
2. To withdraw to the posts herein designated, the Army of the Cumberland will withdraw, first, to Jonesborough; second, to Rough and Ready, and third, to Atlanta, leaving the cavalry to bring up the rear in the manner herein prescribed.
3. The Army of the Tennessee will move in concert with that of the Cumberland, first, to its old position near Jonesborough; second, across the Flint River to about Morrows Mill and third to East Point and the head of Camp Creek.
4. The Army of the Ohio will also move in concert with that of the Cumberland, first, to a point near Jonesborough; second, to some point within two miles and east of Rough and Ready, and last to Decatur.
5. General Kilpatricks cavalry will cover the left rear of the Army of the Tennessee, and that of General Garrard the right rear of the Army of the Ohio until they reach the positions assigned in this order, when the cavalry commands will move to the points designated, viz, Sand- town and Roswell.
6. The general-in-chief will give notice when the movement will begin, and after reaching Atlanta will establish headquarters in Atlanta, and afford the army an opportunity to have a full months rest, with every chance to organize, receive pay, replenish clothing, and prepare for a fine winters campaign.

By order of Maj. Gen. W. T. Sherman:

L. M. DAYTON, Aide-de-camp.

— William T. Sherman, O.R. Series 1 - Volume 38 (Part V) p 801

== Subsequent Orders issued ==
Upon the receipt of Sherman’s Special Field Orders, No. 64, each commander of the three Federal Armies in turn issued Special Field Orders to each of their Cops. The commanders and each Corp. then issued Special Field Orders to their Division Commanders.

Subsequent Orders Issued by commanders under Maj. Gen. William T. Sherman.
Army	Corps.	Date		
		Sept. 5, 1864	Sept. 6, 1864	Sept. 7, 1864
Army of the Cumberland Maj. Gen. George H. Thomas; Destination: Atlanta
Army of the Cumberland Maj. Gen. George H. Thomas; Destination: Atlanta	Army	SO # 245		
Army of the Cumberland Maj. Gen. George H. Thomas; Destination: Atlanta	4th AC	Order of the day (Note: Maj. Gen. Stanley issued an “Order of the day” to the 4th AC detailing their movements from their location on Sept. 5th to Jonesborough.)	Message (Note: On Sept. 6th, a message was sent to Maj. Gen. D. S. Stanley, commanding the 4th AC to move his Corp to Rough and Ready, started at precisely 7 am on the 7th.)	
Army of the Cumberland Maj. Gen. George H. Thomas; Destination: Atlanta	14th AC	Circular (Note: Bvt. Maj. Gen. Jefferson C. Davis issued a “Circular’’ alerting the Corps to be read to move.)	SO # 5	SO # 6
Army of the Cumberland Maj. Gen. George H. Thomas; Destination: Atlanta	20th AC	In Atlanta (Note: The 20th Corps had remained at the crossings over the Chattahoochee River to protect the Federal supply lines. On Sept. 2, a patrol led by Col. John Coburn, formally accepted the surrender of Atlanta from Mayor James M. Calhoun. When General Slocum received word that the confederates had evacuated Atlanta, he moved forward seven brigades to occupy the city.)		
Army of the Tennessee Maj. Gen. Oliver O. Howard; Destination: East Point and the head of Camp Creek
Army of the Tennessee Maj. Gen. Oliver O. Howard; Destination: East Point and the head of Camp Creek	Army	SO # 118	SO # 119	SO # 120
Army of the Tennessee Maj. Gen. Oliver O. Howard; Destination: East Point and the head of Camp Creek	15th AC	SO # 94	SO # 95	SO # 96
Army of the Tennessee Maj. Gen. Oliver O. Howard; Destination: East Point and the head of Camp Creek	16th AC	SO # 76	SO # 77	SO # 78
Army of the Tennessee Maj. Gen. Oliver O. Howard; Destination: East Point and the head of Camp Creek	17th AC			SO # 221
Army of the Ohio Maj. Gen. John M. Schofield; Destination: Decatur
Army of the Ohio Maj. Gen. John M. Schofield; Destination: Decatur	Army	SO # 101	SO # 102	SO # 103
Army of the Ohio Maj. Gen. John M. Schofield; Destination: Decatur	23rd AC	Only Corps (Note: The Army of Ohio only had one Corp.)		

Abbreviations used

AC - Army Corps
SO # - Special Field Order

== Publication in the Official Record ==
This order is part of the Official Records of the American Civil War. It can be found in Series I — Military Operations, Volume XXXVI, Part V, Page 308. The volume was published in 1891.

== See also ==
- Atlanta campaign
- Battle of Jonesborough
- Atlanta in the American Civil War
