= Fort Marcy Officer's Residence =

Historic house in New Mexico, United States

- U.S. National Register of Historic Places
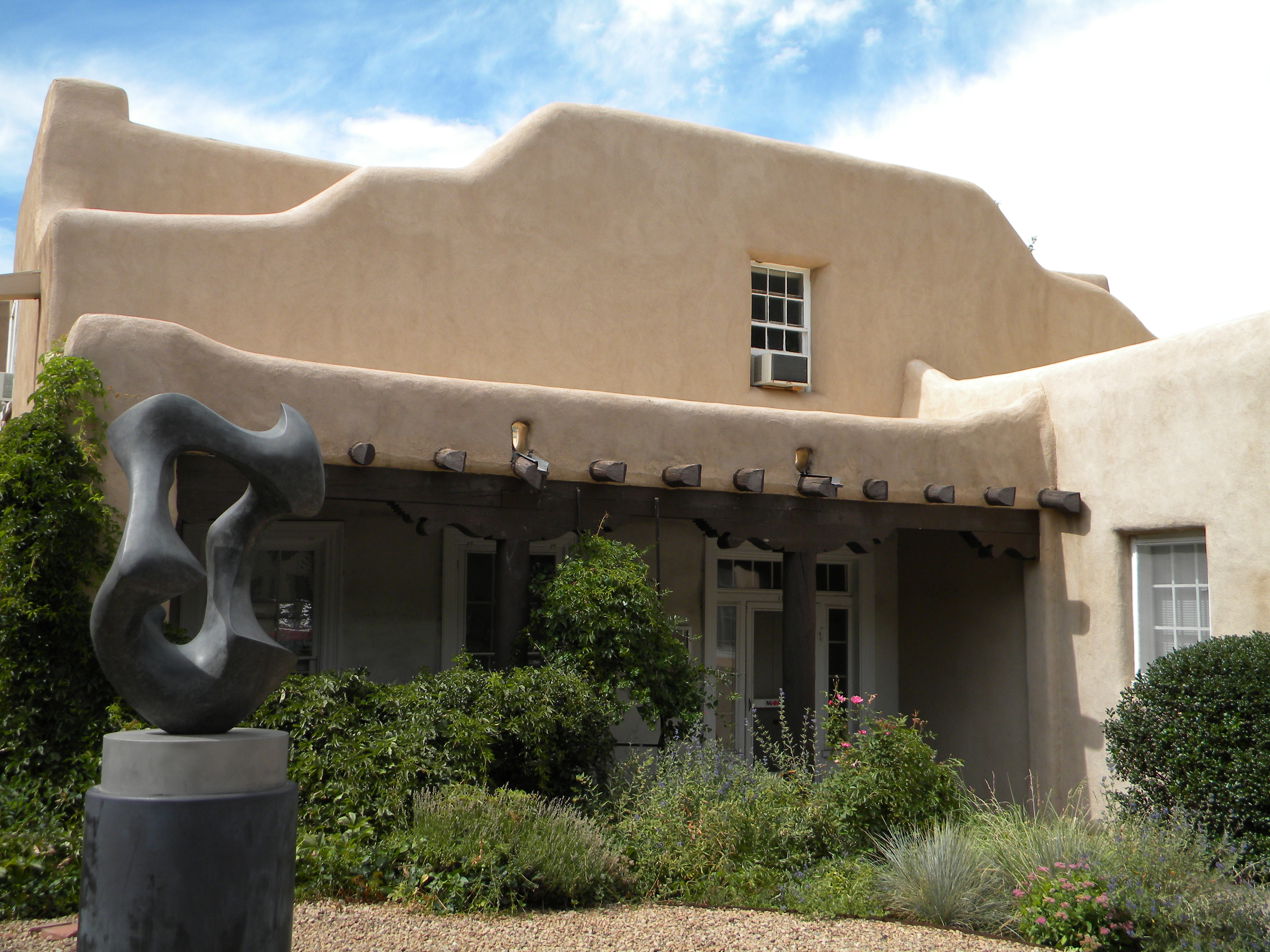

- Location within New Mexico Location within the United States
- Location: 116 Lincoln Ave., Santa Fe, New Mexico
- Coordinates: 35°41′19″N 105°56′17″W
- Area: 0.3 acres (0.12 ha)
- Built: c.1870
- Built by: U.S. Army
- Architectural style: Pueblo
- NRHP reference No.: 75001168
- Added to NRHP: June 20, 1975

The Fort Marcy Officer's Residence, also known as the Edgar Lee Hewett House, in Santa Fe, New Mexico, was built in the early 1870s. It was listed on the National Register of Historic Places in 1975.

It is located at 116 Lincoln Ave., at Fort Marcy. Built by the United States Army, it was the home of Edgar Lee Hewett.

It later served as offices for the Museum of New Mexico Foundation.
