= Jeremy Francis Gilmer =

American soldier and civil engineer

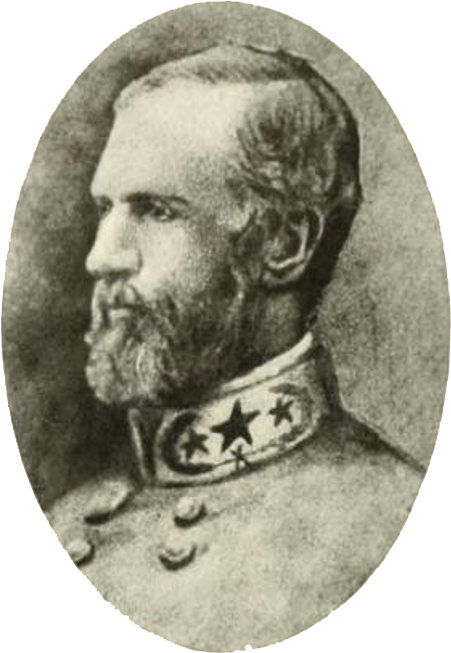
- Gilmer in a 1911 publication
- Born: February 23, 1818; Guilford County, North Carolina, U.S.
- Died: December 1, 1883 (aged 65); Savannah, Georgia, U.S.
- Burial place: Laurel Grove Cemetery
- Military career
- Allegiance: United States of America; Confederate States of America
- Branch: United States Army; Confederate States Army
- Service years: 1839–1861 (USA); 1861–1865 (CSA)
- Rank: Captain (USA); Major General (CSA)
- Conflicts: Mexican–American War; American Civil War; Battle of Shiloh (WIA); Siege of Atlanta
- Other work: President of Savannah Gas Company; Director and engineer of Georgia Central Railroad

Jeremy Francis Gilmer (February 23, 1818 – December 1, 1883) was an American soldier, mapmaker, and civil engineer most noted for his service as the Chief Engineer of the Confederate States Army during the American Civil War. As a major general, he oversaw the planning of the elaborate defenses of the city of Atlanta, Georgia.

== Early life ==
Gilmer was born in Guilford County, North Carolina, on February 23, 1818. He entered the army corps of engineers as a second lieutenant upon his graduation from the United States Military Academy at West Point, New York, on July 1, 1839. He ranked fourth in a graduating class that included future fellow Civil War generals Halleck, Canby, Hunt, and Ord. He was an assistant professor of engineering at West Point until June 1840, when he was reassigned to New York City where he was assistant engineer in the construction of Fort Schuyler in New York Harbor.

Gilmer served in the Mexican War as Chief Engineer of the Army of the West in the New Mexico Territory and helped design and construct Fort Marcy in Santa Fe. He also surveyed battlefields near Mexico City.

Assigned to Georgia, he superintended the improvement of the Savannah River and the construction of Fort Jackson and Fort Pulaski.

Until 1861, he was active in making surveys, constructing fortifications in various locations including San Francisco, California, and executing various river and harbor improvements.

== Civil War ==
Upon the outbreak of the Civil War, he left California, and entered the Confederate service. He was appointed on March 16, 1861 as a Confederate lieutenant of engineers. He resigned from the U.S. Army on June 29, 1861. He soon became chief engineer on the staff of General A. S. Johnston as a lieutenant colonel. Gilmer was severely wounded in his right arm at the Battle of Shiloh, where Johnston was killed. After his recovery in Georgia, Gilmer was promoted to chief engineer of the Department of Northern Virginia in early August 1862. He was stationed at Richmond with the rank of brigadier general.

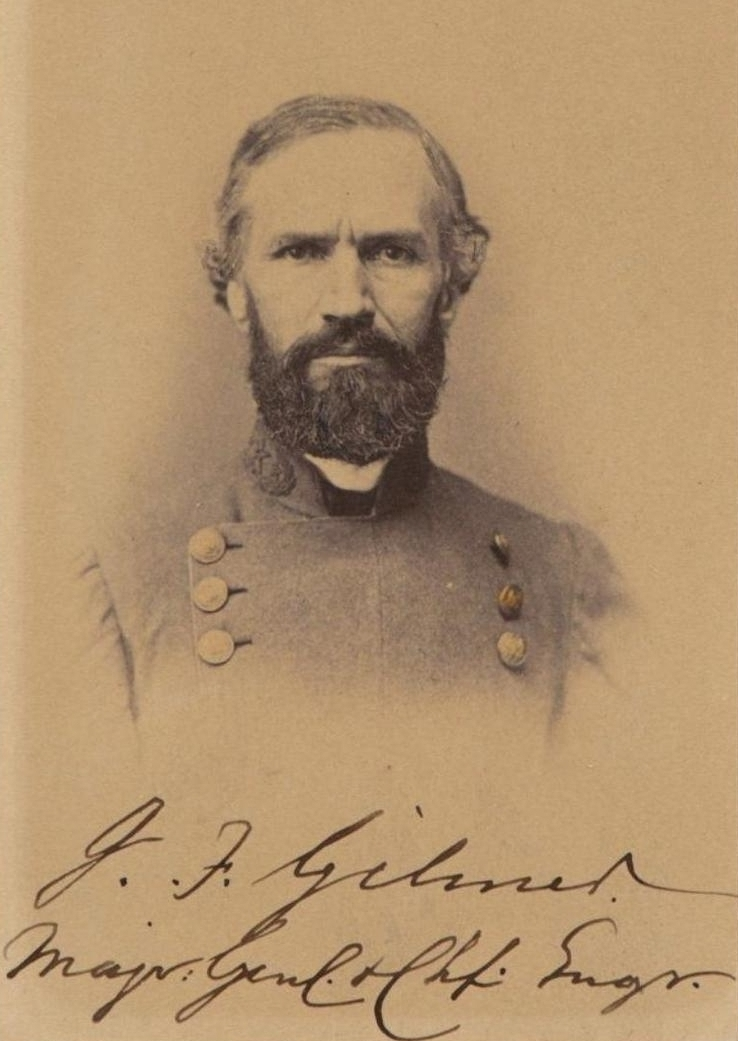
Gilmer, Chief of the Confederate Engineering Bureau

On August 25, 1863, Gilmer was given a temporary appointment to the grade of major general. He was appointed Chief of the Engineer Bureau for the Confederacy. He spent time overseeing the defenses of Charleston, South Carolina, although he was still plagued by recurring health problems from his Shiloh wound. Concerned that the vital rail and manufacturing center of Atlanta would be targeted by Union forces, he commissioned Atlanta businessman and entrepreneur Lemuel P. Grant to develop a plan to ring the city with forts and earthworks along all the key approaches. These elaborate defenses would prove difficult to seize in frontal assaults, forcing the Union army to lay siege to Atlanta in the summer of 1864.

Gilmer helped improve the defenses of Mobile, Alabama, in June and July. He returned to Richmond in July 1864 and spent the rest of the war there as Chief of the Engineer Bureau.

== Post-War career ==
After the war, from 1867–1883 Gilmer was president and engineer of the Savannah Gas Company. He was also a director of the Georgia Central Railroad.

== Death ==
Jeremy F. Gilmer died from heart disease in Savannah, Georgia, and is buried in the city's Laurel Grove Cemetery.

== See also ==
- List of American Civil War generals (Confederate)
