= Pat Kuleto =

Pat Kuleto (born 1945) is an American designer, restaurant impresario, builder, innkeeper, and winemaker, credited with being the first American to bring recognition to restaurant design as a distinct form of interior design. Based in the San Francisco Bay Area, Kuleto had designed nearly 400 restaurants as of late 2009, including some of the most popular fine dining restaurants in the United States.

== Biography ==
Kuleto has no formal interior design education. He was born and grew up in La Crescenta, an unincorporated suburb of Los Angeles. The son of a building contractor, he often built things for himself as a child, including a large play fort with indoor plumbing when he was ten. He left home at age 18 in a camper he had built. He started in the restaurant business as a busboy, then rose to the positions of waiter and cook. Upon settling in Tahoe City he found work as a carpenter and building contractor to remodel restaurants. When the contractor business was slow he offered to design several steakhouses for William McCormick's Refectory Steakhouse chain for free in exchange for serving as the general contractor for construction. By age 28 he had designed 60 restaurants, including 20 Refectory Steakhouses.

Kuleto was married to Shannon. Their son Daniel was born in 1996. In September 2011, he married the former Jennifer Astrup.

== Projects ==
=== Design style ===
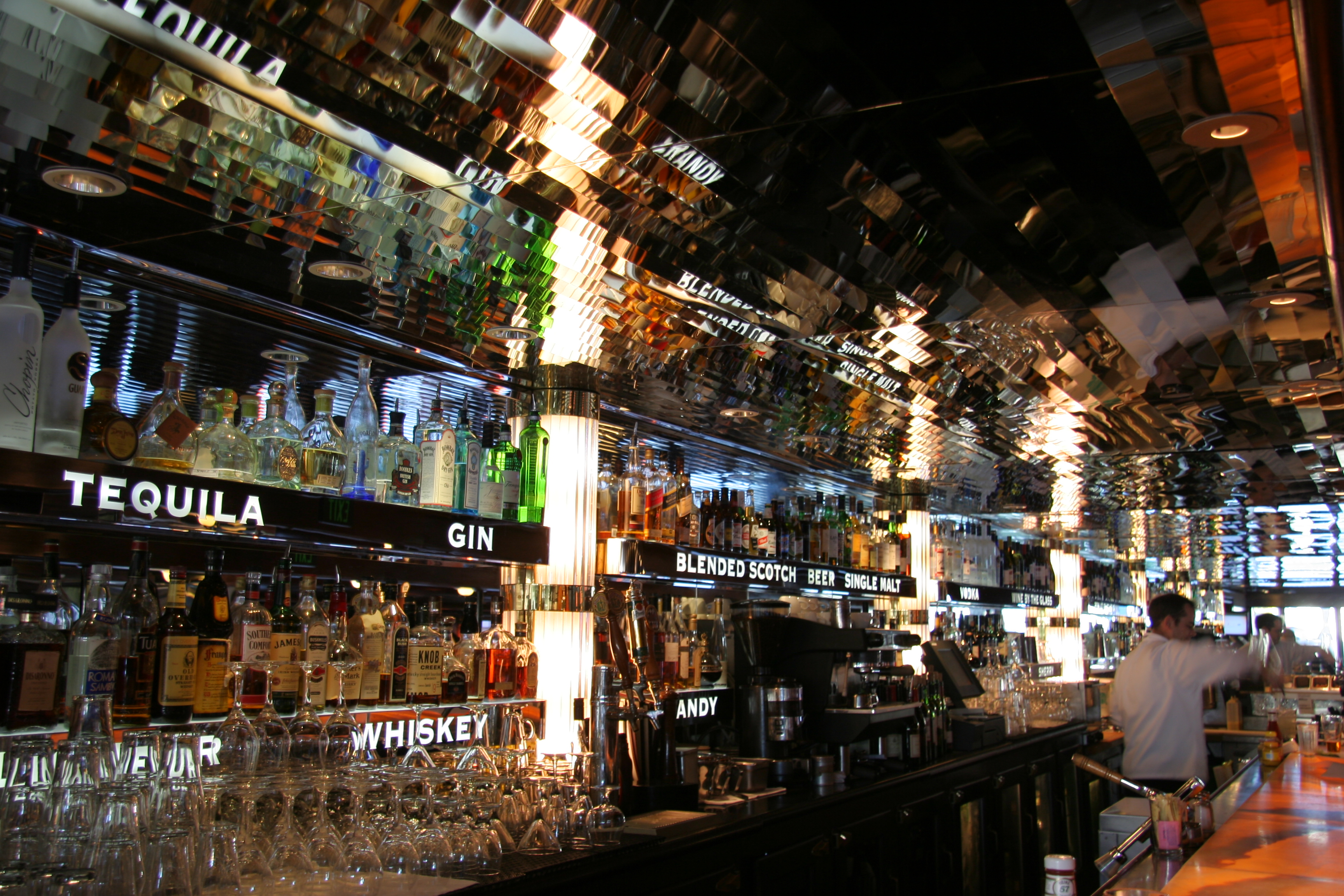
Fog City Diner in San Francisco, California

Kuleto's work does not fit a specific school of design, and is often described as being heavily themed and unique to him. His projects are known for "whimsical" features, and use of expensive, hand-crafted ornamental materials. He says he finds inspiration in many real-life objects, situations, books, places, and landscapes. Most feature multiple dining rooms, a large bar that Kuleto describes as an "altar" that "legitimizes the drinking experience", and an "exhibition kitchen" so that diners can watch their food being cooked.

Kuleto's design process is often extemporaneous, rather than fully planned at the beginning of a project. He usually creates a fictional story about each location, imagining an old invented history. As an example, Epic Roasthouse is imagined as (and is close to the real-life location of) a pump house that was proposed but never built as a backup fire protection system in San Francisco, and would likely have prevented most of the destruction from the fires caused by the 1906 San Francisco earthquake, which ruptured most of the cities primary water mains. The restaurant is the pump house that would have saved the city.

=== Restaurants ===
Kuleto is considered "one of the West Coast's most sought-after restaurant designers". Generally large, expensive, and independently owned, restaurants he has built have tended to be successful. Kuleto's 110th design, the Fog City Diner on San Francisco's Embarcadero, built in 1985 to resemble an American diner, is generally credited as Kuleto's first project to gain critical attention and widespread popularity.

As of 1989, 122 of the 125 restaurants he had designed so far had lasted more than 5 years. Boulevard, which opened in 1993 at a cost of $2.3 million repaid its initial investors within three years and as of 2008 was the second highest grossing independent restaurant in San Francisco, and 59th in the United States.

One restaurant that did not last five years was a branch of Carnegie Deli in Beverly Hills, California, which opened in 1989 at a cost of $4 million, financed and run by oil billionaire Marvin Davis in response to Davis' belief that existing delis in California were of low quality. Davis' unwise business decisions and micromanagement of the restaurant are credited as causes of the decline of the restaurant, which went out of business in 1993. Other projects include Splendido (which closed in 2001) in San Francisco, Buckhead Diner in Atlanta, and Papagus in Chicago.

Restaurants in which Kuleto served as designer and co-owner include Jardinière (with chef Traci Des Jardins), San Francisco's Postrio (with Wolfgang Puck), Farallon (an "undersea fantasy" with Mark Franz), Epic Roasthouse (with Jan Birnbaum), Waterbar (also with Mark Franz), Boulevard (a Belle Époque design in an 1889 brick building that survived the 1906 earthquake, with Nancy Oakes), Kuleto's, McCormick & Kuleto's (a joint project with the McCormick & Schmick's restaurant group at the site of the former Maxwell's Plum), all in San Francisco, and Martini House in Napa Valley (with Todd Humphries). Cafe Gigi in the Eldorado Hotel Casino in Reno, Nev.

=== Other projects ===
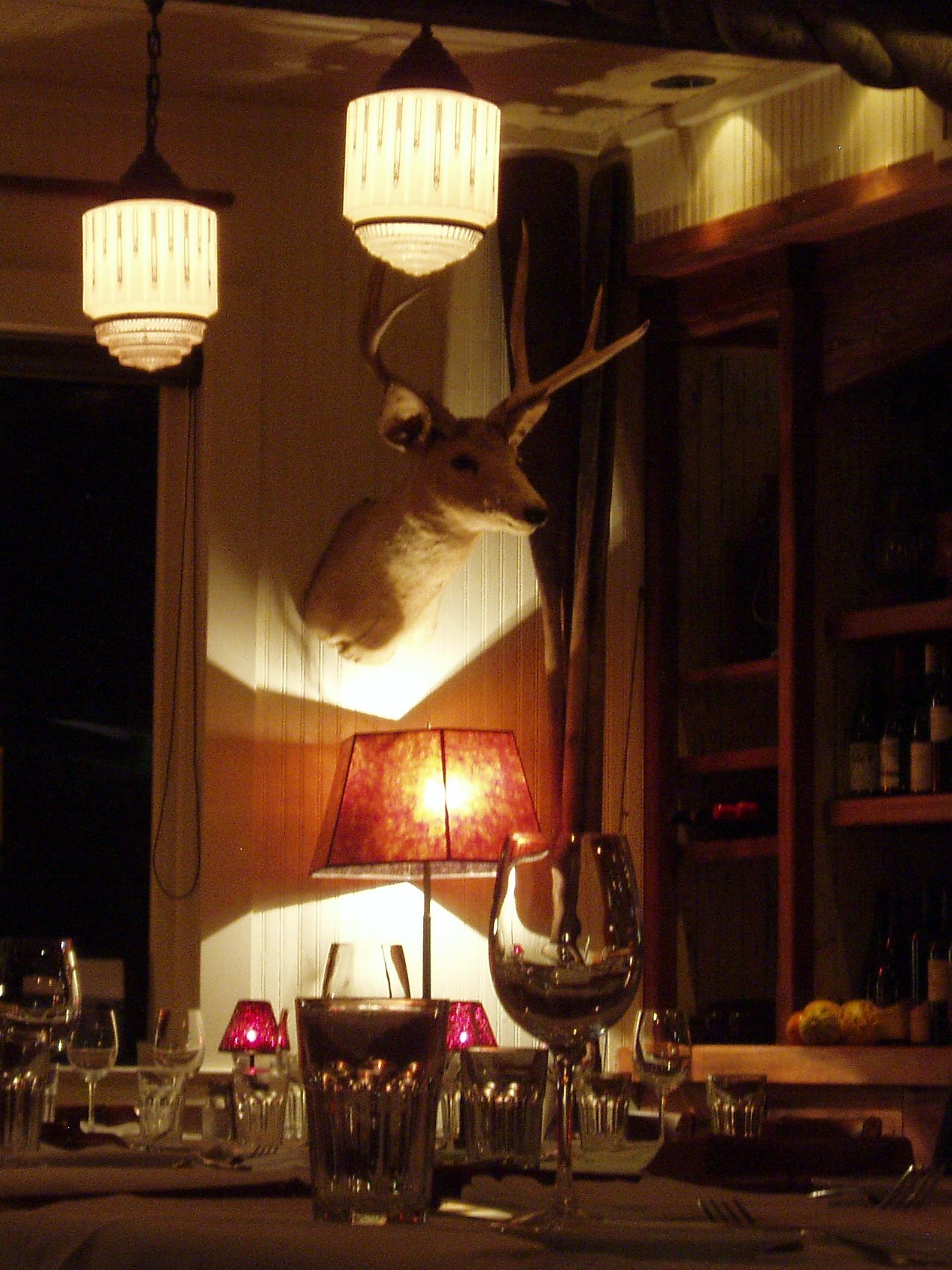
In the dining room at Nick's Cove, in Tomales Bay, California

After making wine for 25 years, Kuleto established the Kuleto Estate Family Winery on an 800-acre (3.2 km^{2}) property in Napa Valley. He purchased the estate in 1992 as a replacement for his old home, which had burned down, and spent the next five years building a 6,000-square-foot (560 m^{2}) home there, which he called Villa Cucina. Although he began growing grapes on the ranch in 1993, and made his own wine, he had not opened up a commercial winery. Construction of the new winery began in 1999 and ended in 2003. As of 2005 the winery was producing 7,500 cases per year of wine, which it sold in the range of $20 to $50 per bottle, from 91 acres (370,000 m^{2}) of grapes. Kuleto served as owner, builder, designer, and co-winemaker. He also raises livestock and farms fish, produce and olives on the property, most of which are processed for private events held on the property. In 2009 Kuleto sold a controlling interest in the wine business (but only a small portion of the grounds and vineyards) to a small wine conglomerate run by financier William P. Foley, who planned to increase production to more than 14,000 cases per year.

In 2000 Kuleto bought the Nick's Cove & Cottages, in the isolated unincorporated town of Nick's Cove, between Marshall, California and Tomales, California along the beach at Tomales Bay in Marin County north of San Francisco. He restored the property to a rustic 1930s appearance at a cost of $14 million, then reopened it in 2007 as an inn of twelve cabins and 130-seat restaurant. The 8-year project involved environmental mitigation (the restaurant's kitchen is above a stream bed; the California red-legged frog, an endangered species, was discovered on the property during construction), restoration of dilapidated building, and a fishing pier.

Nick's Cove re-opened just as the Great Recession was beginning. Saddled with the burden of $13 million in debt during a time of economic insecurity, the venture was unable to become profitable. In a letter to investors, Kuleto said that the venture had been a "complete disaster," with the result being a "complete loss of your financial investment." Kuleto's own losses were $5 million.

The business was sold to Prescott Ashe of Golden Gate Capital in 2011, and is still in operation.
