= Mark Gilbert =

American baseball player and diplomat (born 1956)

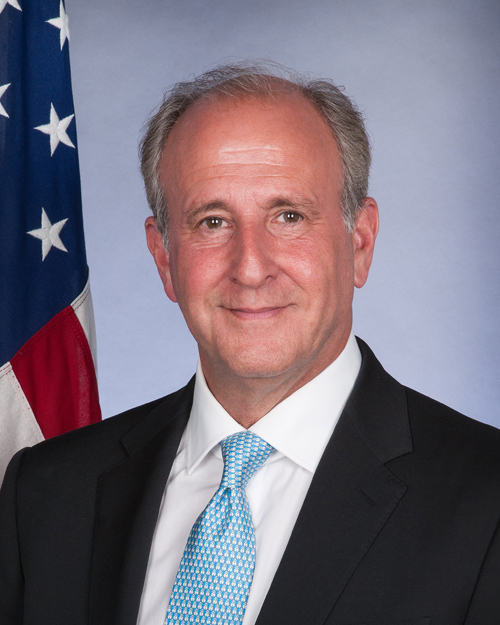
- Official portrait, c. 2015

United States Ambassador to Samoa
- In office May 12, 2015 – January 20, 2017
- President: Barack Obama
- Preceded by: David Huebner
- Succeeded by: Scott Brown

United States Ambassador to New Zealand
- In office February 9, 2015 – January 20, 2017
- President: Barack Obama
- Preceded by: David Huebner
- Succeeded by: Scott Brown

Personal details
- Born: Mark David Gilbert; August 22, 1956 (age 69) Atlanta, Georgia, U.S.
- Party: Democratic
- Education: Florida State University (BS)
- Baseball career
- Outfielder
- Batted: Both Threw: Right

MLB debut
- July 21, 1985, for the Chicago White Sox

Last MLB appearance
- July 27, 1985, for the Chicago White Sox

MLB statistics
- Batting average: .273
- Home runs: 0
- Runs batted in: 3
- Stats at Baseball Reference

Teams
- Chicago White Sox (1985)

Mark David Gilbert (born August 22, 1956) is an American former outfielder in Major League Baseball who served as the United States Ambassador to New Zealand and Samoa from 2015 to 2017.

Gilbert played for the Chicago White Sox in 1985. Subsequently, he had a career as an investment banker.

In 2013, United States President Barack Obama nominated Gilbert to be United States Ambassador to New Zealand and Samoa. The U.S. Senate confirmed Gilbert on December 12, 2014.

== Early and personal life ==
Gilbert is Jewish and was born to a Jewish family in Atlanta, Georgia. He was raised in Pittsburgh, Pennsylvania, with his younger brother and sister until 1973, when they moved to Pompano Beach, Florida, where his father and grandfather owned a furniture store. His father Herbert had played professional baseball as an infielder with the Chicago White Sox organization (reaching Triple A), and his grandfather Joseph Gilbert had played semi-pro baseball as a pitcher and was offered a pro baseball contract with the 1919 Philadelphia Athletics.

He is married to Nancy Gilbert. She owns The Masorti Travel Bureau, which developed the itinerary of the first trip of Birthright Israel, an organization that arranges free trips to Israel for first-time visiting Jewish students ages 18 to 25. The couple has two daughters, Dani and Elizabeth. Gilbert served for three terms as the president of B'nai Torah Congregation in Boca Raton, Florida, and the Gilberts live in Boca Raton.

== High school and college ==
Gilbert starred in baseball, basketball (as a point guard), and track at Churchill High School in Pennsylvania (which later merged with two other schools forming Woodland Hills High School), and subsequently at Pine Crest High School in Fort Lauderdale, Florida. He was a High School All American in basketball and all-state in baseball.

Gilbert earned a bachelor's degree in finance from Florida State University. In his senior year at Florida State, he batted .322 for the Seminoles baseball team, with 48 stolen bases. He also played basketball for the Florida State Seminoles basketball team for one season.

== Professional baseball career ==
Gilbert was picked by the Chicago Cubs in the 14th round of the 1978 Major League Baseball draft and signed with the Cubs that summer. In his debut professional year, in 1978, he batted .338 (5th in the Class A- New York-Pennsylvania League), led the league with 83 runs scored, and stole 35 bases (2nd in the league) for the Geneva Cubs, while playing 65 games as a switch-hitting center fielder. In 1979, he batted .314 (2nd in the Class A Midwest League) and stole 50 bases (3rd in the league) while scoring 80 runs (7th in the league) for the Quad Cities Cubs.

On October 12, 1979, Gilbert was traded by the Chicago Cubs to the Cincinnati Reds, completing a trade in which the Reds had traded Doug Capilla to the Cubs in exchange for a player to be named later on May 3, 1979. He played for the Waterbury Reds in 1980–82, batting .300 (7th in the Class AA Eastern League) with 41 stolen bases (4th in the league) his last year with the team. In 1983, he played for the Indianapolis Indians of the AAA American Association, and in 1984 he played for the Wichita Aeros of the American Association, batting .280 and stealing 55 bases (3rd in the league) and tying for the league lead in walks (77). He became a free agent due to his length of service in the minor leagues on October 11, 1984, and that December 25, he was signed by the Chicago White Sox.

Gilbert was promoted to the major league team from the Chicago White Sox's Triple-A Buffalo Bisons of the American Association in July 1985 and went on to play seven games for the team. He had six hits (five singles, and a double off Dennis Martínez). After a week with the White Sox, Gilbert dove for a line drive, injured his right knee, and was sent back to the minor leagues. On October 15, he was granted free agency. The following year, he left baseball and had knee surgery in February 1986.

Gilbert told the Chicago Tribune's Jerome Holtzman that during his career he endured through seven and a half years of playing in baseball's minor leagues because of his ambition to be listed in the Baseball Encyclopedia. In 1992, Gilbert reflected on his baseball career to Holtzman, saying, "I think everybody thought I would flip out after I was told I couldn't play anymore. I didn't. I had played 22 straight years of organized baseball, since I was 7. I had had enough. I would have continued playing if I hadn't hurt my knee. But I was looking forward to doing something else." He added that his career was worth it: "Absolutely. Everywhere I played I had fun. The most impressive thing being with the White Sox was how congenial everybody was. Carlton Fisk. Harold Baines. Tom Seaver. They were all superstars. Yet they were extremely nice to me and tried to help me as much as they could. No question. It was worth it."

After Gilbert was nominated to be a U.S. Ambassador in 2013, his former major league manager, Tony La Russa, told the Associated Press: "Sure, I remember him. I was always taken with his intelligence and how he was committed to what we were trying to teach — to become a teammate, a competitor, and to pursue excellence as a professional. You do that and get a proper foundation and out of the bottom, out drops your fame and fortune. I think he's now raised his excellence to a new level."

== Finance career ==
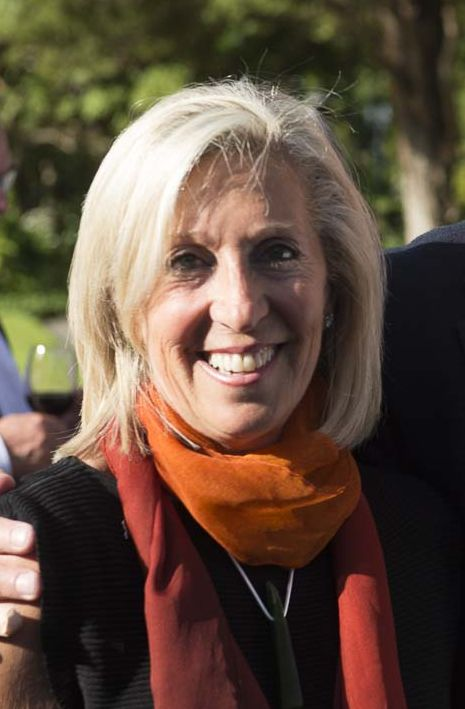
Nancy Gilbert in January 2017

After baseball, Gilbert worked as an investment banker at Drexel Burnham Lambert in Boca Raton, Florida from 1986 until 1989 and then as a senior vice president in the equities division at Goldman Sachs in Miami from 1989 until 1996. Gilbert then joined Lehman Brothers in West Palm Beach, Florida, in 1996, and remained with the firm as it became Barclays Wealth.

== Political fundraising ==
In 2004, Gilbert was a trustee on the national finance committee for the presidential campaign of John Kerry. In 2007, Gilbert began a close relationship as a fundraiser for then-Sen. Barack Obama and quickly became an early supporter of Obama's successful presidential bid. In 2007, Gilbert was appointed deputy national finance chairman for the Democratic National Committee. Ultimately, Gilbert served as a fundraiser for both of Obama's presidential campaigns. In 2012, The New York Times reported that Gilbert had raised $1.23 million for Obama in 2011 and 2012 and a total of $3.36 million since 2007.

== Ambassadorship ==
On October 30, 2013, Obama nominated Gilbert to be United States Ambassador to New Zealand and Samoa. The United States Senate confirmed Gilbert in a voice vote on December 12, 2014.

The United States State Department has no record of any other former major league baseball player serving as an ambassador. While Dennis Martínez, Cal Ripken Jr., and Barry Larkin have served the State Department in roles such as diplomacy envoys, goodwill ambassadors, and baseball sports envoys, Gilbert is the first credentialed ambassador who is a veteran of major league baseball.

== See also ==
- List of ambassadors of the United States to New Zealand
- List of Jewish Major League Baseball players
- Gilbert Marks

Diplomatic posts
Preceded by David Huebner	United States Ambassador to New Zealand; 2015–2017	Succeeded by Scott Brown
Preceded by David Huebner	United States Ambassador to Samoa; 2015–2017	Succeeded by Scott Brown
