= Jeffrey Grayson =

American businessman and criminal

- Born: May 4, 1942; Salem, Oregon, U.S.
- Died: November 27, 2009 (aged 67); Portland, Oregon
- Education: University of Oregon
- Occupation: Co-founder of Capitol Consultants
- Spouse: Susan Grayson

Jeffrey Lloyd Grayson (May 4, 1942 - November 27, 2009) was an American businessman and criminal. A native of Oregon, he co-founded and later was Chief executive officer (CEO) of Capital Consultants. Grayson made legally questionable loans to Wilshire Credit Corporation and its CEO Andrew Wiederhorn. Grayson was convicted of mail fraud along with his son Barclay Grayson.

== Early life ==
Jeffrey Grayson was born on May 4, 1942, in Salem, Oregon. He and his twin sister Janet were born to N. Philip and Blossom Grayson, though the parents divorced in the 1950s. His father was a small business owner. He attended Duniway School in Portland and later graduated from Cleveland High School, also in Portland. Grayson then attended the University of Oregon in Eugene where he spent one year on the cheerleading squad and was a member of the Beta Theta Pi fraternity.

While in college his mother and stepfather were convicted of perjury and concealing assets during bankruptcy in 1961. Grayson graduated with a business degree from Oregon and then enrolled at Willamette University College of Law in Salem. He left after a single year to work for U.S. Bank in securities. Grayson’s twin sister died in a car wreck in 1967.

== Capital Consultants ==
In 1968, Grayson and law school roommate Charles Swindells founded Capital Consultants. The company dealt with investment management. The company grew and by 1976 had $140 million in assets under its management including the pensions for Tektronix and county workers in Multnomah County. Capital Consultants was then the largest independent funds manager in the Pacific Northwest, and at one point had $1 billion in assets under management. The company then had a series of legal issues that included a suspension of the company’s trading license by the SEC and an investigation by the Oregon Attorney General.

Grayson was diagnosed with multiple sclerosis at the age of 42, leading him to join the board of the National Multiple Sclerosis Society’s local chapter. He also was the chairman of the board for the Oregon Museum of Science and Industry. Grayson’s pledge of $1.5 million to the University of Oregon and chairing their endowment campaign led to the naming of a building on campus for the Graysons, which was later revoked.

In the late 1990s, the company and Grayson became involved in a scheme similar to a Ponzi scheme. The U.S. Securities and Exchange Commission sued the company and Grayson in September 2000. On September 21, 2000, the district court placed CCL into receivership and appointed appellee Thomas F. Lennon as receiver. A judge later removed Grayson from control of the company, and federal prosecutors filed a charges for 22 separate counts in October 2001. Grayson pleaded guilty to mail fraud and another charge in the case, and could have received up to four years in jail. He suffered a stroke in 2002 that left him unable to appear or testify in court, and prevented him from being sentenced to prison.

== Later life and death ==
Grayson blamed the crimes on an attempt to recover the investment losses of his clients. Following the stroke, Grayson was sent to a long-term care facility in Southwest Portland. Jeffrey Grayson died on November 27, 2009, at the age of 67 in Portland, Oregon.
