= David Huebner =

American lawyer and diplomat (born 1960)

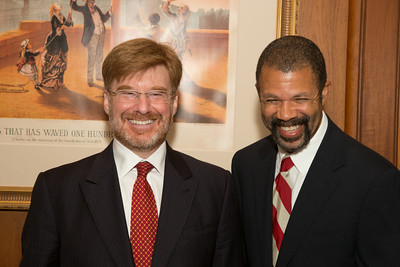
- David Huebner, former United States Ambassador to New Zealand and Samoa (left) with spouse, Dr. Duane McWaine

United States Ambassador to New Zealand
- In office December 4, 2009 – January 17, 2014
- President: Barack Obama
- Preceded by: William McCormick
- Succeeded by: Mark Gilbert

United States Ambassador to Samoa
- In office February 3, 2010 – January 17, 2014
- President: Barack Obama
- Preceded by: William McCormick
- Succeeded by: Mark Gilbert

Personal details
- Born: 1960 (age 65–66) Mahanoy City, Pennsylvania, U.S.
- Party: Democratic
- Spouse: Duane McWaine
- Education: Princeton University (BA); Yale University (JD)

David Huebner (born 1960) is an American lawyer. He is an international arbitrator based in Southern California. He previously served as the United States Ambassador to New Zealand and Samoa. He was the first openly gay ambassador in the Obama administration and the third openly gay ambassador in United States history.

== Early life ==
Huebner was born in Mahanoy City, Pennsylvania, a small coal mining town in Schuylkill County. He attended Mahanoy Area High School after which he earned an A.B. degree summa cum laude from Princeton University's Woodrow Wilson School of Public and International Affairs. While at Princeton he was named a David Lawrence Scholar, served as president of Quadrangle Club, and was inducted into Phi Beta Kappa. He earned his Juris Doctor degree at Yale Law School, where he served as editor-in-chief of the Yale Journal on Regulation, was director of the Street Law Project (which taught civics and basic law classes in local high schools), and was a member of the Yale AIDS Law Project, a student group that assisted with the publication of AIDS and the Law. From 1984 to 1985, Huebner was on leave of absence from Yale as a Henry Luce Scholar, serving as a special assistant to the Hon. Koji Kakizawa, a member of the lower house of Japan's Diet.

== Legal career ==
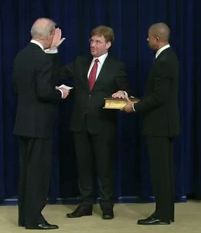
Huebner, accompanied by his partner Duane McWaine, sworn in as ambassador by U.S. Vice President Joe Biden in 2009.

After graduating from law school in 1986, Huebner moved to Los Angeles, California as a Fellow at the Center for Law in the Public Interest. A year later, he began his career in private legal practice at Irell & Manella. In 1992, Huebner joined the international law firm Coudert Brothers where he specialized in international arbitration and corporate compliance work and served as managing partner of the Los Angeles office, on the global executive board, and for a term as global chairman and chief executive officer. In September 2005, he joined Sheppard, Mullin, Richter & Hampton LLP, moving to Shanghai to open the firm's first overseas office. He served as the firm's chief representative in China and managing partner of the Shanghai office, where he specialized in international arbitration, corporate compliance, and trade until leaving to become Ambassador.

In April 2014, Huebner joined the law firm Arnold & Porter LLP as a partner in its international arbitration, public international law, energy, and national security practices. He represented governments and corporations in international disputes, trade, and investment matters with an emphasis on intellectual property-intensive sectors as well as energy, infrastructure, and construction projects. He also handled cross-border regulatory, corporate compliance, and cyber and supply chain security matters. In 2016, President Barack Obama appointed him to the Panel of Arbitrators of the International Centre for the Settlement of Investment Disputes (ICSID). The White House press release announcing the designation mentioned that the key administration appointment is for a six-year term. In early 2017 he left private law practice to become an independent arbitrator and mediator, and he affiliated with the arbitration institution JAMS International.

He is admitted as a Fellow of the London-based Chartered Institute of Arbitrators, serves on the Paris-based International Chamber of Commerce's Commission on Arbitration and ADR, and serves on the panels or lists of arbitrators of several arbitration institutions, including the International Center for Dispute Resolution, Hong Kong International Arbitration Centre, Shanghai International Arbitration Center, Kuala Lumpur Regional Center for Arbitration, World Intellectual Property Organization, American Arbitration Association, China International Economic and Trade Arbitration Commission, and JAMS. He is the chairman of the Southern California chapter of the Chartered Institute of Arbitrators.

In 1999 Huebner was appointed to the California Law Revision Commission by Governor Gray Davis and was reappointed in 2005 by Governor Arnold Schwarzenegger. From 1999 to 2007 he taught full-semester courses in international law at the University of Southern California Gould School of Law. He has also served as an arbitrator for more than a decade at the annual Willem Vis International Commercial Arbitration Moot competitions in Hong Kong and Vienna.

== Diplomatic career ==
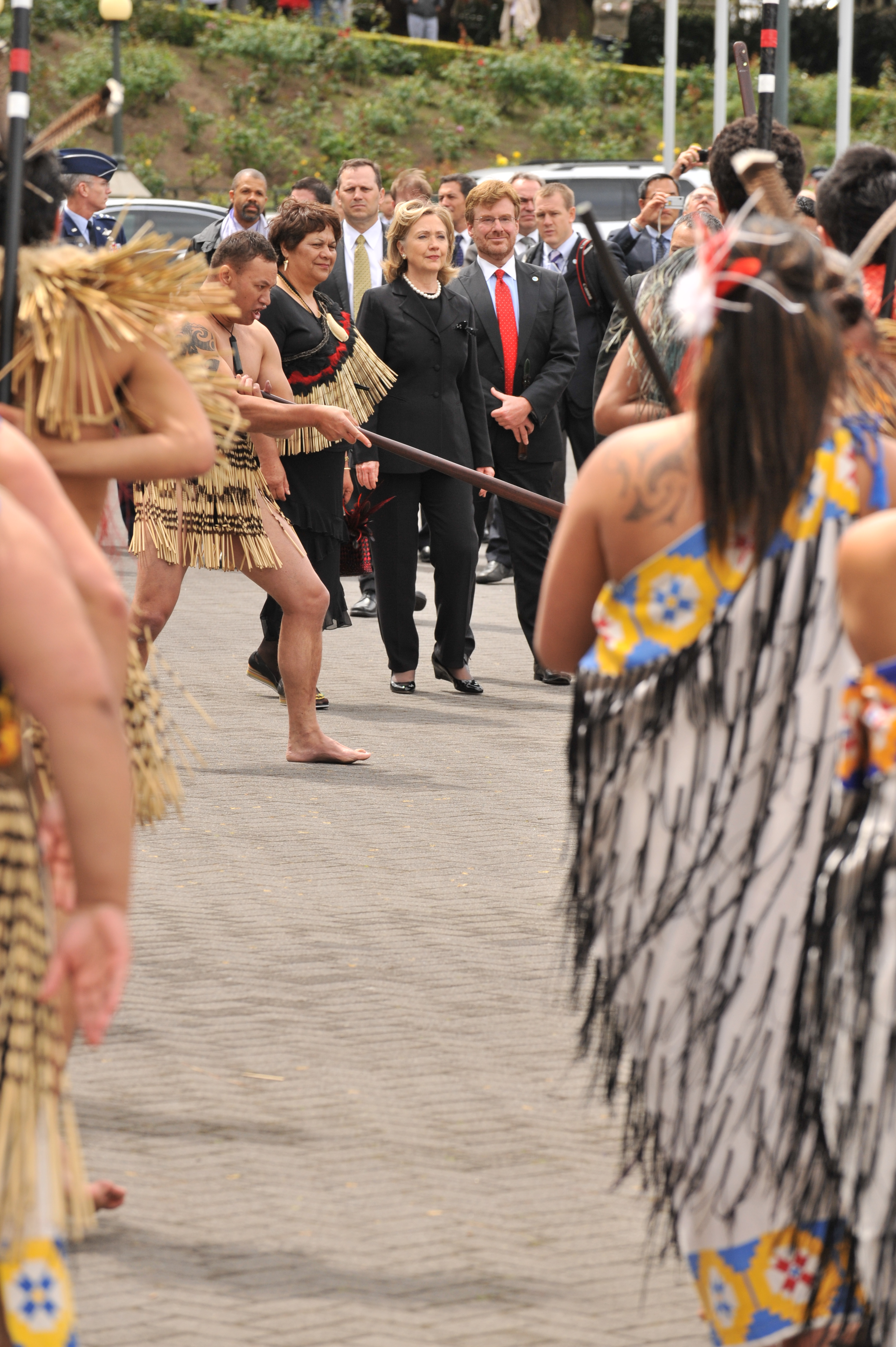
Former Secretary of State Hillary Clinton with Ambassador Huebner during a Pōwhiri at Parliament forecourt - Wellington, November 2010.

In October 2009, President Barack Obama nominated Huebner as U.S. Ambassador to New Zealand and Samoa, a post held by William McCormick until January 2009. Huebner was confirmed by the U.S. Senate on November 20, 2009. Huebner, a Democrat, was the first openly gay ambassador in the Obama administration, and the third openly gay ambassador in U.S. history. He was the first LGBT ambassador in American history knowingly confirmed by the U.S. Senate. During his confirmation hearing before the Senate Committee on Foreign Relations, Huebner introduced his partner of 20 years, Duane McWaine; the hearing was held on the couple's 20th wedding anniversary, which Huebner acknowledged in his remarks. Huebner was sworn in as ambassador at the White House by Vice President Joseph Biden on December 4, 2009.

Separately accredited to New Zealand and Samoa, he has responsibility as well for U.S. relations with the small island nations of Cook Islands and Niue. During his time as ambassador, Huebner reengineered his two embassies around youth outreach, whole-of-society engagement, expanding exchange programs, developing new approaches and tools of “21st Century Statecraft,” and identifying practical, mutually beneficial opportunities for bilateral and multilateral cooperation on economic, science/technology, political, security, and civil society projects. In February 2013, The Sosaiete o Fa’afafine in American Samoa (S.O.I.F.A.S) hosted a welcoming event for Ambassador Huebner as a way of recognizing the role of human rights in the region raise awareness on "organizational issues" (in Samoan culture, being transgender has traditionally been tolerated and celebrated, while homosexuality is illegal). During this visit, Ambassador Huebner was given an official shirt embroidered with the S.O.I.F.A.S logo that is currently available in the LGBT Collection at the Smithsonian National Museum of American History. The U.S. State Department and outside commentators have suggested that current relations between the United States and New Zealand are the best they have been in decades.

=== Bilateral relations ===
Huebner hosted an unusually large number of visits by senior officials during his tenure as ambassador, including visits to New Zealand by Secretary of State Hillary Clinton in 2010 (the first such visit to Wellington in a quarter century), Secretary of Homeland Security Janet Napolitano in 2012, Secretary of Defense Leon Panetta in 2012 (the first visit by a Secretary of Defense in more than 30 years), and Attorney General Eric Holder in 2013, as well as a visit to Cook Islands by Secretary of State Hillary Clinton in 2012. During her 2010 visit to Wellington, Secretary Clinton and New Zealand Minister of Foreign Affairs Murray McCully signed the Wellington Declaration, reaffirming the historical ties between the U.S. and New Zealand and establishing a framework for renewed strategic partnership and practical cooperation. During a visit to Washington in 2012, New Zealand Defence Minister Jonathan Coleman and Secretary of Defense Leon Panetta signed the Washington Declaration, reaffirming the two countries historical cooperation on security matters and setting a framework for renewed dialogue and practical collaboration in areas such as humanitarian and disaster relief and maritime security.

Huebner successfully advocated for a Shiprider Joint Maritime Law Enforcement Agreement between Samoa and the United States to assist Apia in enforcing its rights within its Exclusive Economic Zone. He also hosted the Pacific Partnership mission in 2013, restructured Embassy Apia around civil society capacity building and economic development, and facilitated construction of a district medical center near Faleolo Airport by the U.S. Pacific Command.

=== Youth outreach ===
Upon his arrival Huebner began forming student adviser groups at each university in New Zealand with whom he meets regularly. All of the adviser groups are brought together annually for a three-day Connecting Young Leaders Conference focused on leadership training, policy discussions, and networking. His student adviser program has been replicated in other jurisdictions. In 2013 he launched a similar annual Future Leaders of the Pacific Conference (FLP) to engage with young leaders under age 25 from the 17 nations of the Pacific Islands Forum. The first FLP was held in Pago Pago, American Samoa. The second FLP is scheduled for 2014 in Apia, Samoa.

Other youth programs included establishing annual travel awards for top science students and social entrepreneurs, adding Samoa to the Fulbright scholarship program, supporting the Vex Robotics competitions in New Zealand, frequently teaching in local secondary schools, regularly lecturing in universities, sponsoring sports exchanges, adding students to the periodic U.S./N.Z. Partnership Forum, and hosting NASA's annual mobile apps competition (NASA Space Apps Challenge). Under his leadership the Embassy organized and hosted in 2013 the inaugural USA Universities Expo in Auckland which drew representatives from 35 American institutions of higher education and more than 2,600 local attendees.

=== Public diplomacy ===
Huebner restructured his Embassies to focus on whole-of-society and digital outreach. He launched new programs to engage indigenous peoples, the Pacific diaspora, faith communities, the LGBT community, veterans, and social entrepreneurs, and he revised Embassy invitation lists and events to reflect and include the full community.

Huebner also retooled Embassy Wellington into a test for the State Department's cyber-diplomacy and 21st Century Statecraft initiatives. In 2010 he launched one of the first ambassador blogs and significantly expanded his Embassies’ social media platforms. In 2013 he built a digital recording and broadcast studio in Embassy Wellington. Under his leadership, Embassy Wellington in 2012 conceived and then partnered with the Auckland University of Technology and Social Media NZ to host the inaugural Project (R)evolution conference, which drew more than 200 digital thinkers from New Zealand, the United States, and elsewhere to discuss the status and future of digital communications and internet-driven change. The next Project conference was scheduled for May 2014.

== Civic and volunteer activities ==
Huebner has been a generous benefactor of youth literacy and education programs including the Mahanoy City Public Library. He currently sits as honorary chairperson of Fulbright New Zealand, a trustee of the New Zealand Antarctic Heritage Trust, and patron for the American Chamber of Commerce. He was a founding member of the Los Angeles Committee on Foreign Relations and was active in the Los Angeles World Affairs Council and the Pacific Council on International Policy. He served as a founding national board member, co-chair, and general counsel of the Gay & Lesbian Alliance Against Defamation (GLAAD) and as a member of the board of the Los Angeles Gay & Lesbian Center.

In 1994 he was appointed by the city council to the Los Angeles Quality & Productivity Commission, where he served as president. In 1999 Huebner was appointed to the California Law Revision Commission by Governor Gray Davis and was reappointed in 2005 by Governor Arnold Schwarzenegger, serving several terms as chairman. He served as a staff counsel to the Independent Commission on the Los Angeles Police Department, formed after the Rodney King incident. He served on California Governor Gray Davis’ Judicial Selection Advisory Committee.

He has a particular interest in education and literacy efforts. For many years he has supported the public library in his hometown of Mahanoy City, and he was recently awarded the key to the City in recognition of his efforts. From 1999 to 2007 he taught full-semester courses in international law at the University of Southern California Gould School of Law and has lectured and led seminars in other universities in China, New Zealand, and the United States.

Huebner was elected to life membership in the Council on Foreign Relations in 2015. He currently serves on the board of the Pacific Council on International Policy, Founder Council of the Williams Institute at the University of California, Los Angeles, School of Law, the executive committee of the Asia Society of Southern California, and the boards of the Swiss International Law School, Yale Center for Environmental Law & Policy, Princeton AlumniCorps, USC Annenberg Center for Public Diplomacy, and Franklin Delano Roosevelt Foundation.

== Honors and awards ==
The communications industry professional association Public Affairs Asia awarded him and his team the Gold Standard Award for Social Media Communications at its annual awards event in Singapore in 2012.

On August 24, 2013, Huebner served as Grand Marshal at celebrations of the 150th anniversary of the founding of his hometown of Mahanoy City. For his public service and his support of the public library he was awarded the key to the city by the Mayor.

On October 20, 2013, Huebner and his spouse Dr. Duane McWaine were honored by GABA (Gay Auckland Business Association) at a black-tie dinner in recognition of their whole-of-society engagement and contributions to the LGBT community in New Zealand.

On October 25, 2013, the Royal Society of New Zealand awarded him an Illuminated Scroll for his efforts in promoting science and technology collaboration and education.

On October 30, 2013, Huebner was made a Fellow of the Auckland University of Technology Faculty of Business and Law in recognition of his commitment to higher education and student achievement. AUT's Vice-Chancellor, Derek McCormack, presented the award at a reception held at Auckland's Mackelvie Gallery.

On August 19, 2014, Huebner's diplomatic passport, his spouse Dr. McWaine's diplomatic passport, and other artifacts of his time as ambassador to New Zealand and Samoa were taken by the Smithsonian Institution into its permanent collection of American history.

In 2015 he was invited to deliver the 7th Annual Franklin Delano Roosevelt Memorial Lecture at Harvard's Adams House and the 10th Annual Robert I. Weil Lecture by the Los Angeles County Bar Association.

In 2016 the Secretary of the Navy awarded Huebner the U.S. Navy's Distinguished Public Service Award for his humanitarian and security work as ambassador.

== See also ==
- Embassy of the United States in Wellington
- List of LGBT ambassadors of the United States

Diplomatic posts
Preceded by William McCormick	United States Ambassador to New Zealand; Also accredited to Samoa; 2009–2014	Succeeded by Mark Gilbert
