= Buffalo's Cafe =

American restaurant chain

- Formerly: Buffalo's Southwest Cafe (2001–2011)
- Industry: Restaurants
- Founded: October 26, 1985; 40 years ago in Roswell, Georgia, United States
- Founders: David Hyde and Ralph Perella
- Headquarters: Los Angeles, California (FAT Brands Inc.)
- Areas served: Asia; North America
- Key people: Shaun Curtis (chief operating officer)
- Parent: FBG Bid Co.
- Website: buffalos.com

Buffalo's Cafe is an American restaurant chain known for its Buffalo-style chicken wings. Buffalo's Cafe began in 1985, as a single restaurant in Roswell, Georgia. In 1991, founders David Hyde and Ralph Perella began franchising the restaurant under the name Buffalo's Franchise Concepts Inc. (BFCI) The company had 40 locations by 1998. In 2001, the chain was renamed Buffalo's Southwest Cafe following the introduction of southwestern food. A location in Kuwait opened at the end of that year.

In 2006, the company launched a fast casual restaurant known as Buffalo's Express. Later that year, Perella sold BFCI to Texas native Drew Alexander and his business partner Shelli Lang, a Las Vegas resident. In 2011, the chain had been renamed Buffalo's Cafe, and was sold to Fog Cutter Capital Group Inc., which also owned Fatburger. Fog Cutter Capital Group subsequently opened several co-branded Fatburger/Buffalo's Express locations. In 2017, ownership of the chain was transferred to FAT Brands, a subsidiary of Fog Cutter Capital Group. The chain has locations in North America and Asia.

== History ==
=== Buffalo's Cafe (1985–2001) ===
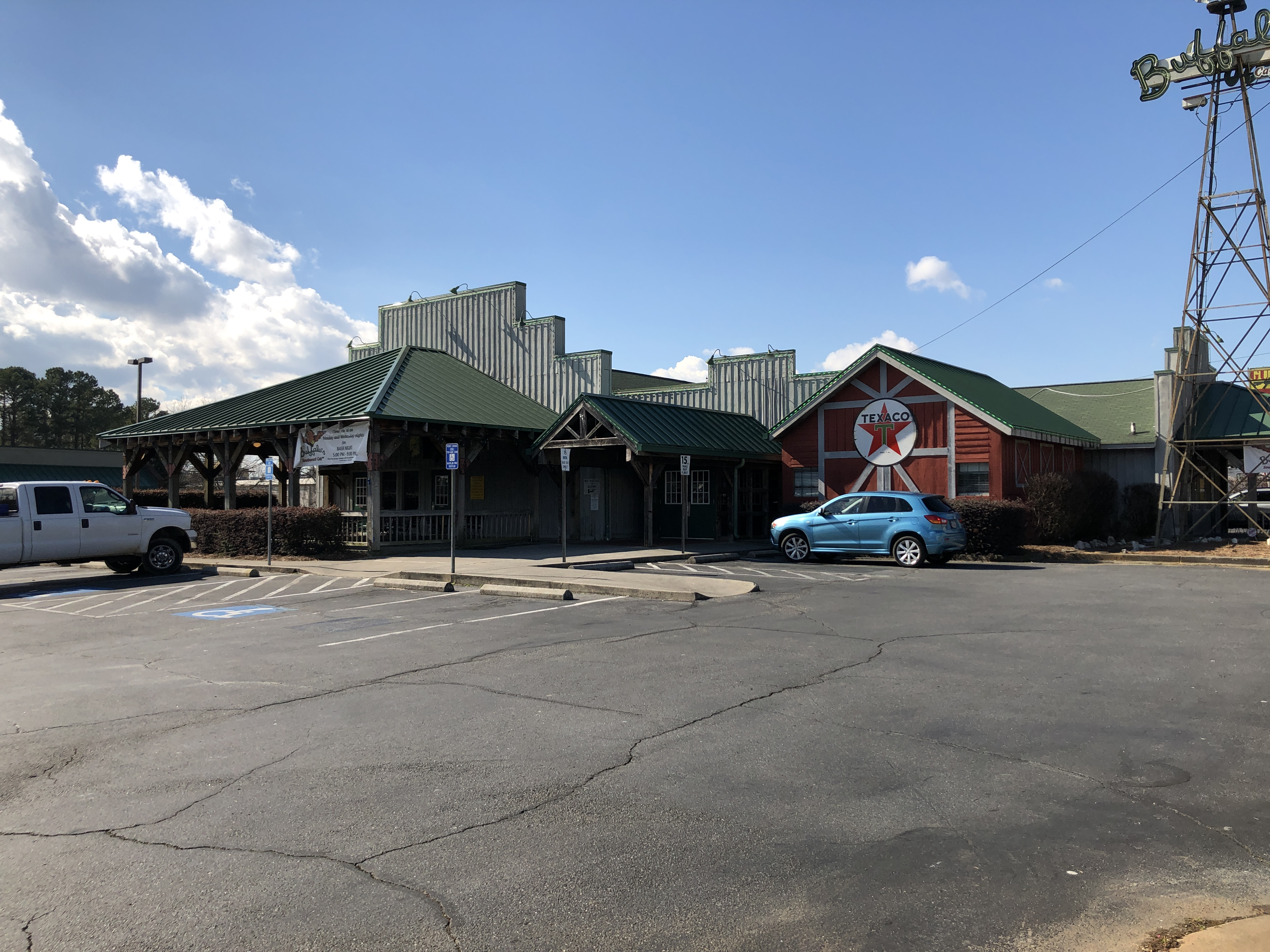
A Buffalo's Cafe in Cartersville, Georgia

Buffalo's Cafe was formed in 1985, by friends David Hyde and Ralph Perrella. They chose a western theme for their first restaurant, which was designed and built by Perella, who was a graduate of Georgia Tech and an architect with construction experience. According to Perella: "We wanted to make it look like it had been there for 30 years. We created a rustic décor to capture the feel of an old Southwest café, with rough wood floors, distressed metal ceilings, American antiques, artifacts, memorabilia and hundreds of period photographs lining the wooded walls."

Hyde and Perella opened their first Buffalo's Cafe in Roswell, Georgia, on October 26, 1985. The restaurant was named for its signature item: Buffalo-style chicken wings. By 1990, there were four Buffalo's Cafe locations operating in the metropolitan Atlanta area. Franchising began the following year, under the name Buffalo's Franchise Concepts Inc. (BFCI). In 1995, the Atlanta-based company had 35 restaurants, located in Florida, Georgia, North Carolina, South Carolina, and Tennessee. Sixteen of its locations were in the metropolitan Atlanta area.

By the end of 1995, the company planned a rapid expansion throughout the Southeast United States that would add 16 new franchised restaurants over the next 18 months, with a total of 100 locations expected in three years. In late 1997, Ray Cabana was named as BFCI's new president, director, and chief executive; he had previously was chief executive and president of Johnny Rockets for four years before joining Buffalo's as a consultant in 1996.

As of 1998, the chain had 40 restaurant locations. The company planned to have 100 locations by 2000, and signed development agreements for the Midwestern United States, as well as Indonesia and Egypt. The company opened its first restaurant in Puerto Rico in December 1998. In 2000 the chain launched a $1 million promotional campaign for its 46 restaurants. The campaign included a cowboy character used as a family-oriented spokesperson in radio and television commercials.

=== Buffalo's Southwest Cafe (2001–2011) ===
In May 2001, the Buffalo's Cafe name was changed to Buffalo's Southwest Cafe to reflect new southwestern food items added to the menu, while retaining Buffalo wings. Restaurant facilities were also updated to include a new design by Perella. The company opened a restaurant in Kuwait, in December 2001.

In 2003, the company expanded to Indiana. At the end of 2003, the company announced plans to open its first Texas location in late 2004, in Houston. Texas was a major component of the company's expansion plan, and several sites in northwestern Houston were being evaluated. During 2006, the company launched Buffalo's Express, a fast casual restaurant concept. The company also began construction on a restaurant location in Riyadh, Saudi Arabia.

During 2006, the company also planned to add two new Nevada locations, in Pahrump and Ely. The Pahrump location was proposed by Texas native Drew Alexander, along with business partner and Las Vegas resident Shelli Lang. The pair owned locations in Las Vegas and Mesquite, Nevada, and had been partners for 14 years, previously as franchisees for Hair Club for Men. Alexander became involved in the company three years earlier when he purchased a franchise territory in Nevada.

In December 2006, Perella sold BFCI to Alexander and Lang. Under the new ownership, Alexander would become company president and chief operating officer; Lang would be vice president, secretary, and treasurer; and Perella would become a consultant. The sale included the new Buffalo's Express concept, which was to be expanded. The company would remain based in Marietta, while opening sales offices in Las Vegas. At the time, the chain had 38 restaurants, located in 10 states, Puerto Rico, and Kuwait; 34 locations were franchised and the other 4 were company-owned and located in Georgia. Because of the Great Recession, the company reduced some of its expansion plans.

=== Buffalo's Cafe (2011–present) ===
During 2011, the restaurant chain had reverted to its "Buffalo's Cafe" name. Fog Cutter Capital Group Inc., which owned Fatburger, announced in December 2011 that it had acquired Buffalo's Cafe and Buffalo's Express Cafe. At the time, the chain had 26 U.S. locations, in Georgia, Florida, Indiana, North Carolina, and Texas, as well as five locations in Kuwait and one in Riyadh. Fog Cutter Capital Group had been interested in the company because of its potential for growth in the Middle East. In 2012, Fog Cutter Capital Group opened a co-branded Fatburger/Buffalo's Express in Los Angeles, in part as a display for international franchisees. The co-branded location had a 33 percent increase over average revenues for standalone locations, which ignited interest among U.S. franchisees for additional Fatburger/Buffalo's Express locations. By September 2013, six co-branded locations had opened while an additional 36 were under development.

In 2017, ownership of Fatburger and Buffalo's Cafe was transferred to FAT Brands, a wholly owned subsidiary formed by Fog Cutter Capital Group and based in Los Angeles. FAT Brands succeeded BFCI. Buffalo's Express expanded to Singapore in September 2018, with the opening of co-branded Fatburger restaurants. Buffalo's Cafe operates 14 restaurants in Georgia, as well as one in Riyadh and two in Doha, Qatar. There are 19 Fatburger/Buffalo's Express locations in California; 13 locations in Canada; two in the Philippines; and one each in Dubai and Malaysia.

On January 26, 2026, parent company FAT Brands filed for Chapter 11 bankruptcy protection in an effort to shed billions of dollars in debt. The company listed assets and liabilities between $1 billion and $10 billion. After receiving court approval for the sale of its assets, FBG Bid Co. officially acquired the remaining assets from FAT Brands for $595 million on June 18, 2026, including Buffalo’s Cafe.

== Buffalo's Sinkhole ==
In August 2002, a Buffalo's Southwest Cafe in Hickory, North Carolina was closed after two sinkholes opened in the restaurant's parking lot following record rainfall. A Chevrolet Corvette fell into one of the sinkholes. The restaurant reopened in 2003, after nine months of repairs to remove the sinkholes. The restaurant owner believed that the sinkhole incident would increase business, but it did not, and the restaurant eventually closed in May 2004. The franchisee then sued the city, the North Carolina Department of Transportation, and the previous owners of the land over the issue of the sinkhole, which would become known as Buffalo's Sinkhole. A sinkhole opened again in the parking lot in July 2005, following Hurricane Cindy. The lawsuit was settled in 2007 and the restaurant was demolished later that year, while Buffalo's Sinkhole remained an issue as of 2016, posing a risk to the nearby Highway 70.
