= Jake's Famous Crawfish =

Seafood restaurant in Portland, Oregon, U.S.

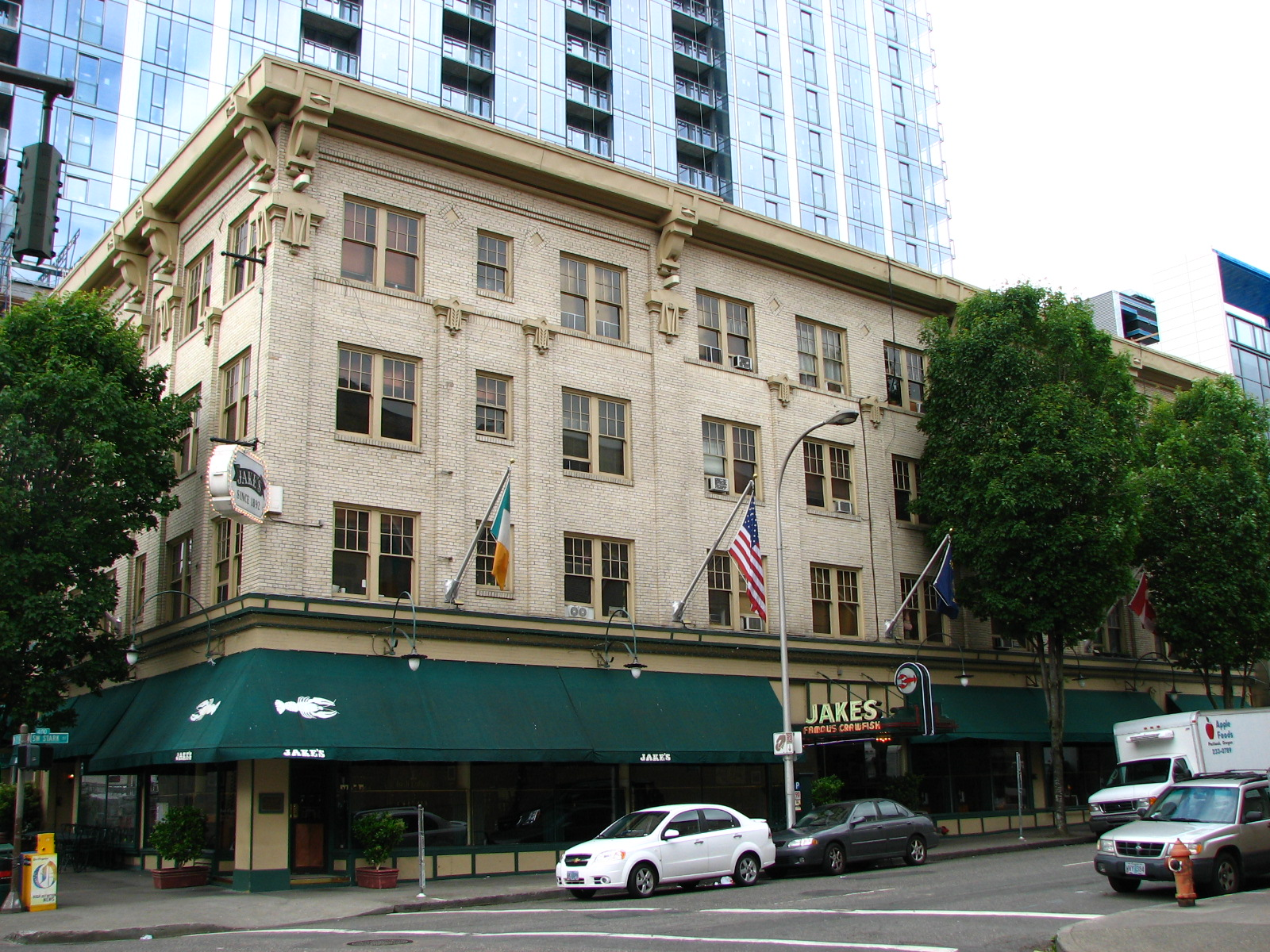
- Exterior of the restaurant within the Whitney and Gray Building
- Interactive map of Jake's Famous Crawfish

Restaurant information
- Established: 1892
- Owner: Landry's, Inc.
- Food type: Seafood
- Location: 401 SW 12th Avenue, Portland, Oregon, U.S.
- Coordinates: 45°31′21.2″N 122°41′0.5″W
- Website: www.jakesfamous.com

Jake's Famous Crawfish is a seafood restaurant in downtown Portland, Oregon, founded in 1892 by Jacob "Jake" Lewis Freiman. It is housed in the Whitney and Gray Building, completed in 1910.

== History ==
Since the opening of the building, the lower level has housed Portland's landmark restaurant, Jake's Famous Crawfish Restaurant. The current Jake's Restaurant and its predecessor establishments date back to 1892, establishing it as Portland's second oldest continuously operating restaurant. The original restaurant was called Mueller and Meier, a saloon established in 1892 at 18th and Washington Streets. This restaurant was one of two crawfish houses in Portland at the turn of the century. Mueller and Meier moved to the Whitney & Gray Building in 1911, where it operated as a saloon until 1913, when it became Mueller and Meier Cafe. In 1916 statewide prohibition took effect in Oregon and the restaurant began a soft drink service, a focus that continued throughout Prohibition.

In 1920, Mueller and Meier sold their interests to Jacob J. Freiman and J. Rometsch. Jake Freiman, the original "Jake", had been a waiter at the Quelle Restaurant, a crawfish house established by Fritz Sichtem and Baron Schlenk in 1893. Freiman, a popular waiter and local character, brought with him the crawfish expertise, a large customer following, and popularity which established the reputation that has continued to the current day.

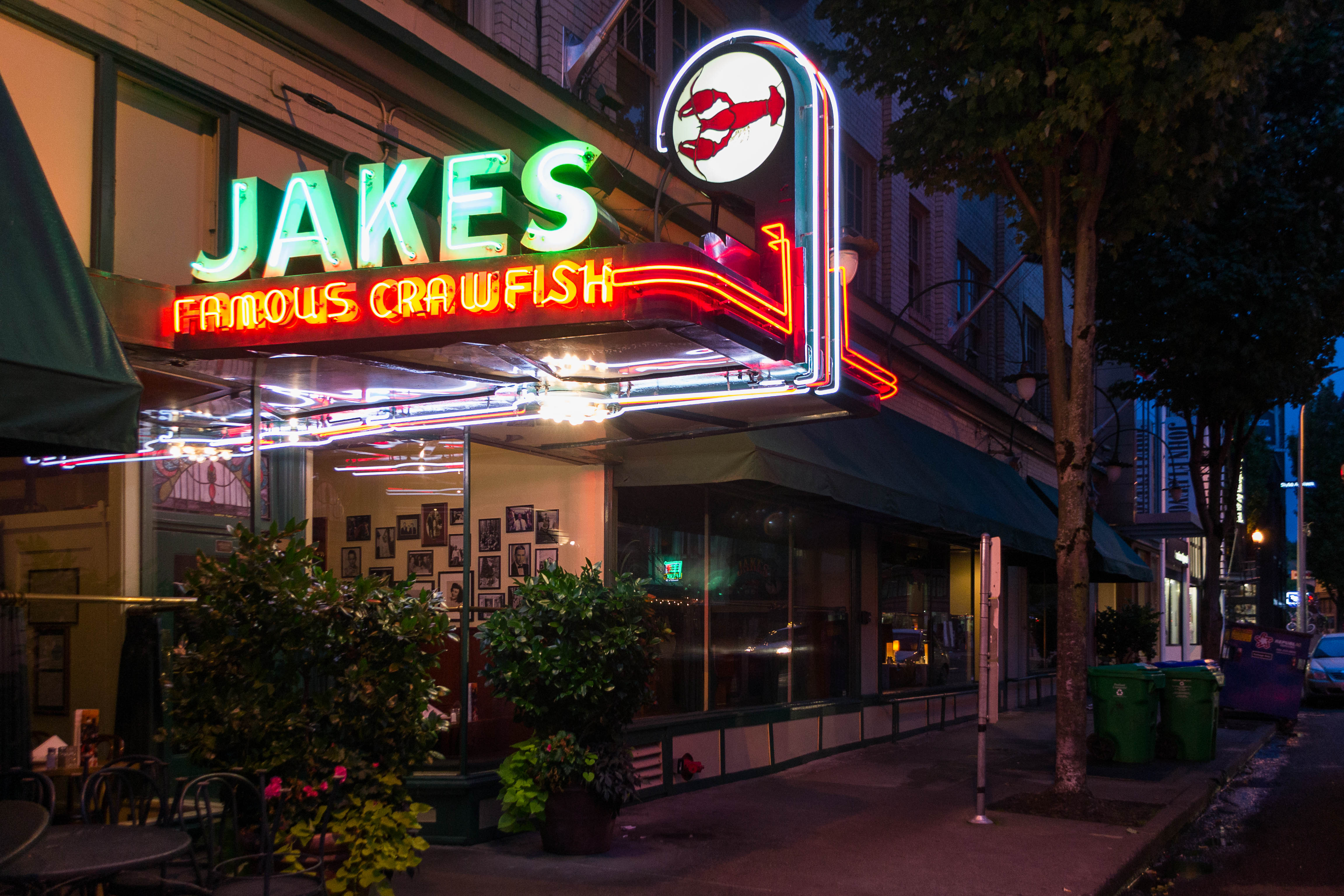
The restaurant at night, 2013

In 1921, or 1922, Rometsch left or was bought out by Clem Hackman, and the latter association continued until 1933 when Jake died. The operation was then sold to Joseph Kaffesieder. Joe Kaffesieder, an outgoing personality himself, maintained the traditions and character of the restaurant and, in fact, also was known to many patrons as "Jake". The restaurant was later operated by Max Kaffesieder, Joe's son. Walter E. Holman Sr., acquired the restaurant in 1946 and operated it until 1958, when he sold the establishment to his son Walter Jr., who operated in until 1960. It was then sold to three investors, Orton Hall, a dentist, Glen Westfall, a contractor, and a third party. In 1961, Howard Wilson, a former manager under Walter Holman, acquired the facility with partner Nick Shewczyk. The current owner, William McCormick, acquired the restaurant in 1971.

In 1972, William "Bill" McCormick purchased Jake's Famous Crawfish and hired Doug Schmick as his manager. Several years later, the pair formed a partnership that would later become the restaurant chain McCormick & Schmick's.

The building that has housed the restaurant since 1911 was added to the U.S. National Register of Historic Places in 1983, as the Whitney & Gray Building and Jake's Famous Crawfish Restaurant.

== Description ==
Rachel Dresbeck described the restaurant as having a "turn-of-the-last-century ambiance, with its maze of booths snug against brick walls, its antique oil paintings, deep wood paneling, beautiful bar and crisp white linen." The menu has included French onion soup.

== Reception ==
Willamette Week readers ranked Jake's Famous Crawfish first place in the "Best Old Hometown Restaurant" category in 2004. In 2008, the Willamette Week included Jake's in its list of the top 100 restaurants in Portland. In 2009, Jake's was recognized in the seafood category in The Oregonian's list of the best restaurants in downtown Portland.

== See also ==
- List of seafood restaurants
- National Register of Historic Places listings in South and Southwest Portland, Oregon
