= Charles Swindells =

American diplomat

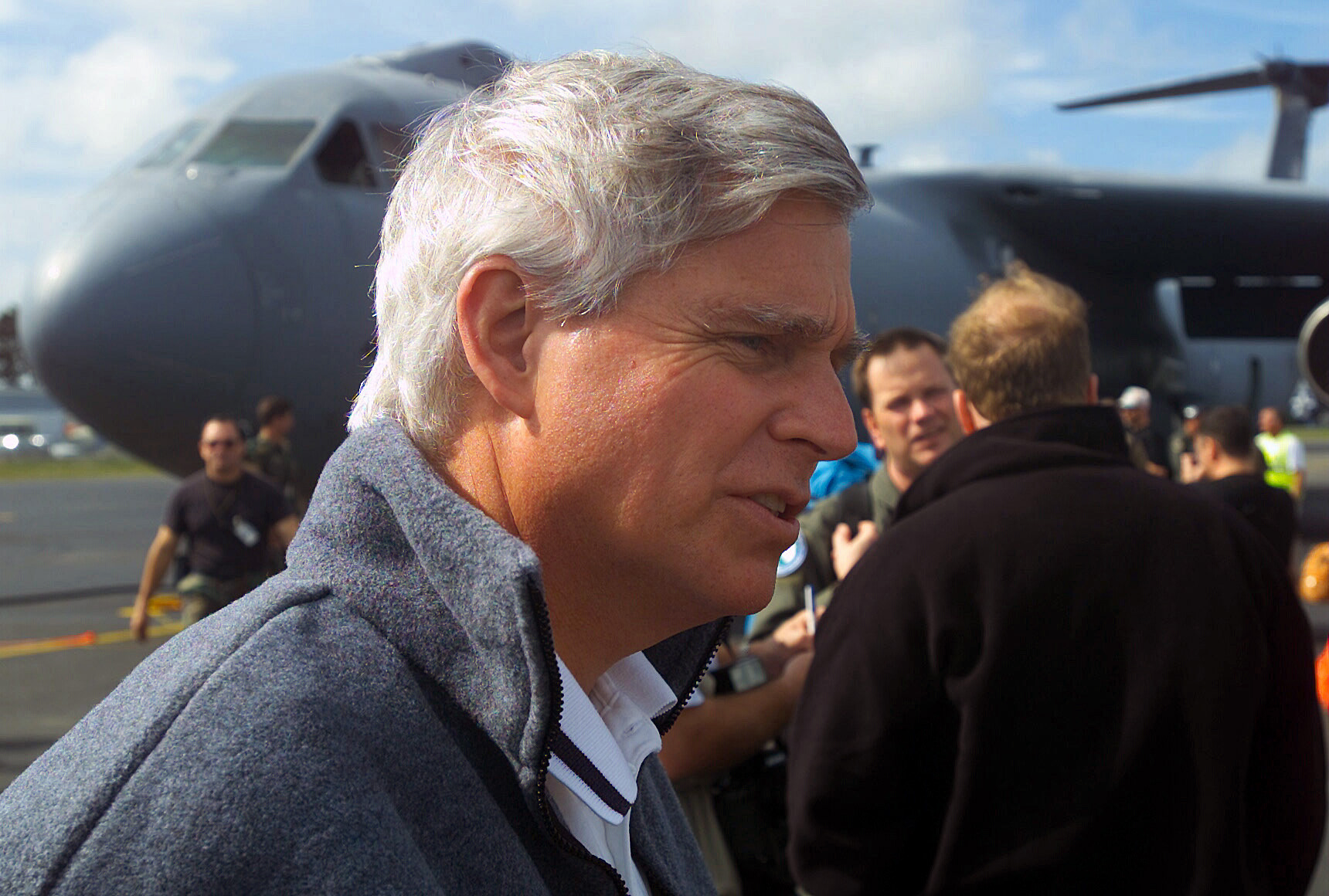
Ambassador Charles J. (Butch) Swindells in Christchurch, NZ in 2002.

Charles Joseph "Butch" Swindells (born 1942) is a former United States Ambassador to New Zealand and Samoa. He was appointed to the position by U.S. President George W. Bush on June 5, 2001 with the strong support of his home state of Oregon's two U.S. Senators. He served from 2001 to 2005.

== Early life and career ==
Swindells earned a B.S. from Lewis & Clark College in 1964, and served as a trustee there from 1998 to 2001. He also attended Willamette University College of Law. After law school, he went into finance and investing. In 1968, he and law school roommate Jeffrey Grayson founded Capital Consultants together; Swindells left that company in 1985 (and was not involved in the company's financial scandal of the late 1990s). He later co-founded Capital Trust Co., which became one of the largest trust companies in the Northwest, in 1981.

Swindells has served on the board of directors of Swift Energy Company and The Greenbrier Companies.

== See also ==
- Contents of the United States diplomatic cables leak (New Zealand)
- Petroleum Exploration and Production Association of New Zealand

Diplomatic posts
Preceded by Carol Moseley Braun	U.S. Ambassador to New Zealand; Also accredited to Samoa; 2001–2005	Succeeded by William McCormick
