= Andrew Wiederhorn =

American businessman (born 1966)

- Born: February 10, 1966 (age 60); Portland, Oregon, U.S.
- Education: Lincoln High School
- Alma mater: University of Southern California
- Occupations: Chairman and Founder of FAT Brands, Inc.
- Spouse(s): Jessica Wiederhorn, (m. 2020)

Andrew A. Wiederhorn (born February 10, 1966) is an American businessman from Portland, Oregon. He is the chairman and founder of FAT Brands Inc., a restaurant franchising company that owns 17 restaurant brands, and franchises over 2,300 units worldwide. Previously, he was CEO and president of FAT Brands from 2017 to 2023.

Prior to FAT Brands, he was founder, chairman, and CEO of Fog Cutter Capital Group Inc., Wilshire Financial Services Group Inc., and Wilshire Credit Corporation, with a then net worth of $140 million.

== Early life ==
Wiederhorn was born and raised in Portland, Oregon. He was raised in a single-parent home by his mother after his father died when he was nine years old. As a teenager, he obtained a permit allowing him to rent jet skis along the Willamette River to earn an income. He graduated from Lincoln High School before attending the University of Southern California, where he earned a Bachelor's degree in business.

== Career ==
=== Wilshire Financial Services Group and controversies ===
Wiederhorn founded Fog Cutter Capital Group, formerly known as Wilshire Real Estate Investment Trust Inc., as well as Wilshire Credit Corporation, a subsidiary of Wilshire Financial Services Group, the latter of which collapsed during the fall of the 1998 Wall Street financial crisis. Litigation began following questionable investments involving union retirement funds. However, US law enforcement continued a criminal investigation into Wiederhorn's activities while at Wilshire Credit Corporation, which was ended when Wiederhorn pleaded guilty to filing a false tax return and an ERISA violation by forgiving a loan guaranty from Jeffrey Grayson, the head of Capital Consultants. Wiederhorn also paid a $2 million fine and served 14 months in federal prison from 2004 to 2005. In April 2013, while conducting a CBS Undercover Boss press interview, Wiederhorn attributed his jail sentence to bad legal advice he had received on a business deal, which led to the violation of the pension fund law, ERISA.

The controversy around Wiederhorn continued when the board of directors of Fog Cutter Capital Group voted to give Wiederhorn a bonus equal to the fine he paid the US government, and paid his salary during his incarceration—despite Federal rules that a convict can not engage in business dealings while imprisoned. The immediate result was that NASDAQ delisted Fog Cutter Capital Group.

The long-term result was that Wiederhorn had his membership in the influential Multnomah Athletic Club suspended in October 2004. The Wall Street Journal described the Club as "the premier social center for executives, politicians and socialities in this city of more than half a million." After finishing his sentence, Wiederhorn initiated a legal fight against the Club, claiming that it had treated him unfairly and that other Multnomah Athletic Club members who have committed crimes were not disciplined as harshly as him. One example he cited was his former business associate Lawrence Mendelsohn, who pleaded guilty in the same case involving Capital Consultants, but served no jail time.

Wiederhorn lost the lawsuit, and found himself "something of a pariah" as a 2011 newspaper article described his situation. Fog Cutter Capital Group owned a major position in Fatburger, a restaurant chain based in southern California, and because he needed to devote more attention to the restaurant chain, moved to Beverly Hills in 2009, saying that will make his commute to Fatburger's then Santa Monica headquarters considerably easier and cheaper. His home in Portland, a 25,000-square-foot (2,300 m^{2}) mansion he dubbed "The Ivy," was put up for sale in July 2011 for $5.7 million. Wiederhorn had acquired the mansion and its properties in a trade from Casey Powell, former CEO of Sequent Computer Systems in 1995, then spent $8.7 million constructing a new wing to the house and other improvements.

=== FAT Brands ===
Fatburger had struggled through the Great Recession, with subsidiaries in California and Nevada entering Chapter 11 bankruptcy in 2009. In 2011 Wiederhorn announced that the 101-outlet chain had successfully restructured. According to the California Corporation Commission, Fatburger has been given the green light to continue selling its franchise.

While expanding the company, Wiederhorn acquired Buffalo's Cafe in 2011 and Ponderosa and Bonanza Steakhouses in 2017. He launched global restaurant franchising company, FAT Brands, which he took public on the NASDAQ in 2017. Through FAT Brands, he also acquired Johnny Rockets in 2020 and then in 2021, Global Franchise Group, Twin Peaks, Fazoli’s and Native Grill & Wings.

The television show Undercover Boss featured Wiederhorn and Fatburger as the subjects of its April 5, 2013, episode.

== Criminal convictions and further charges ==
Wiederhorn served a penitentiary sentence after pleading guilty to multiple felony counts between 2004 and 2005, which included filing a false tax return and an ERISA violation.

In May 2024, Wiederhorn was indicted on federal charges for an alleged scheme to conceal $47 million paid to himself in the form of shareholder loans. In a separate indictment, he was charged with illegally possessing a firearm and ammunition after being convicted of a felony.

All charges were dropped by the Department of Justice in 2025

Additionally, the SEC dropped all cases “based on the facts and circumstances of this case and in light of the evidence developed in discovery”.
