= Whitney and Gray Building =

Historic building in Portland, Oregon, U.S.

- Whitney and Gray Building and Jake's Famous Crawfish Restaurant
- U.S. National Register of Historic Places
- Portland Historic Landmark
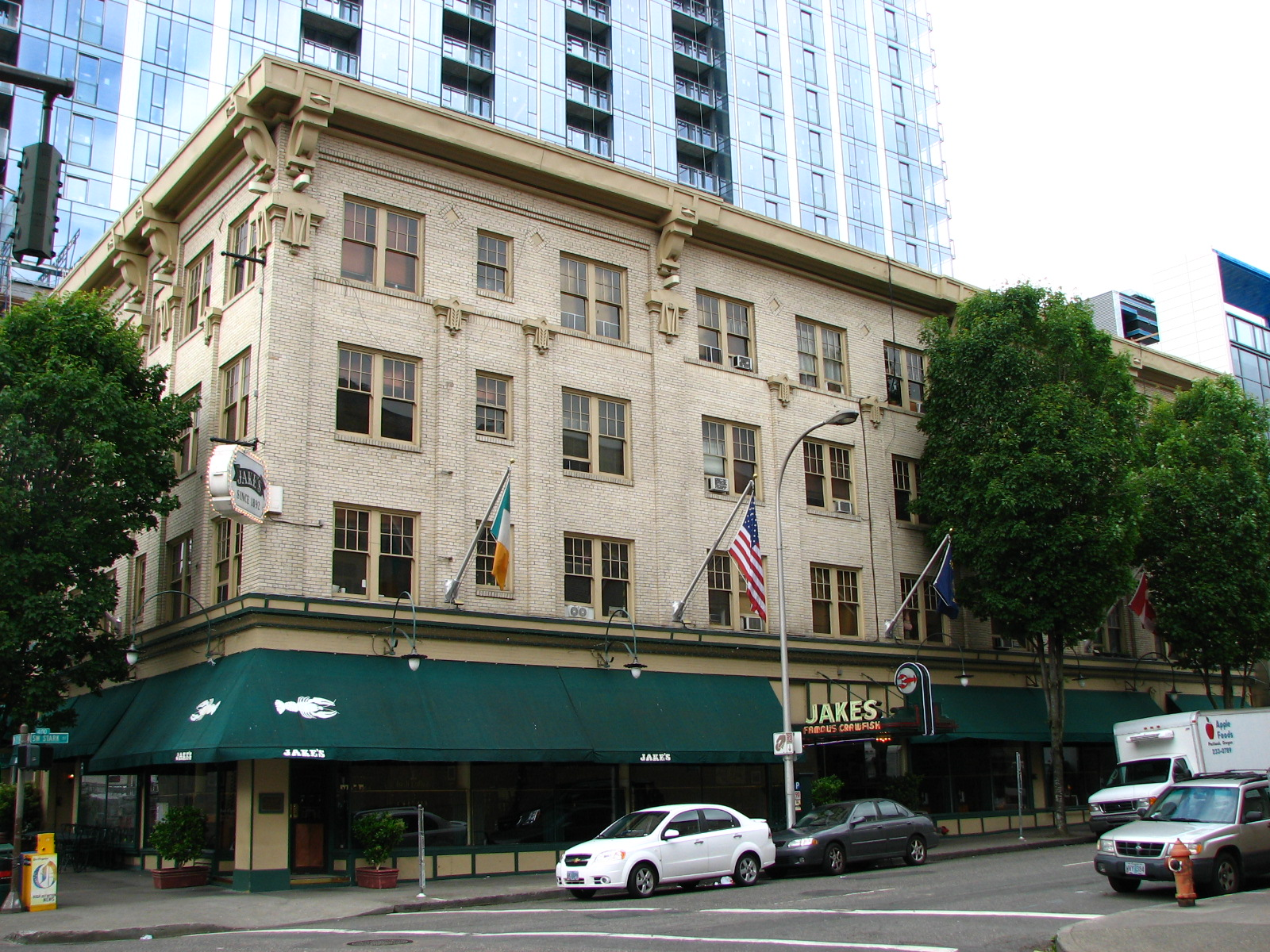
- The building's exterior in 2009

- Location within Portland, Oregon Location within Portland, Oregon Location within Oregon
- Location: 2417 SW 16th Avenue; Portland, Oregon
- Coordinates: 45°31′21″N 122°41′01″W
- Built: 1910
- Architect: Knighton & Root
- NRHP reference No.: 83002177
- Added to NRHP: August 11, 1983

The Whitney and Gray Building is an historic building in Portland, Oregon. It houses the restaurant Jake's Famous Crawfish and is listed on the National Register of Historic Places.

The building that has housed the restaurant since 1911 was added to the U.S. National Register of Historic Places in 1983, as the Whitney & Gray Building and Jake's Famous Crawfish Restaurant.

== See also ==
- National Register of Historic Places listings in South and Southwest Portland, Oregon
