= Nick's Cove, California =

Nick's Cove
- Resort
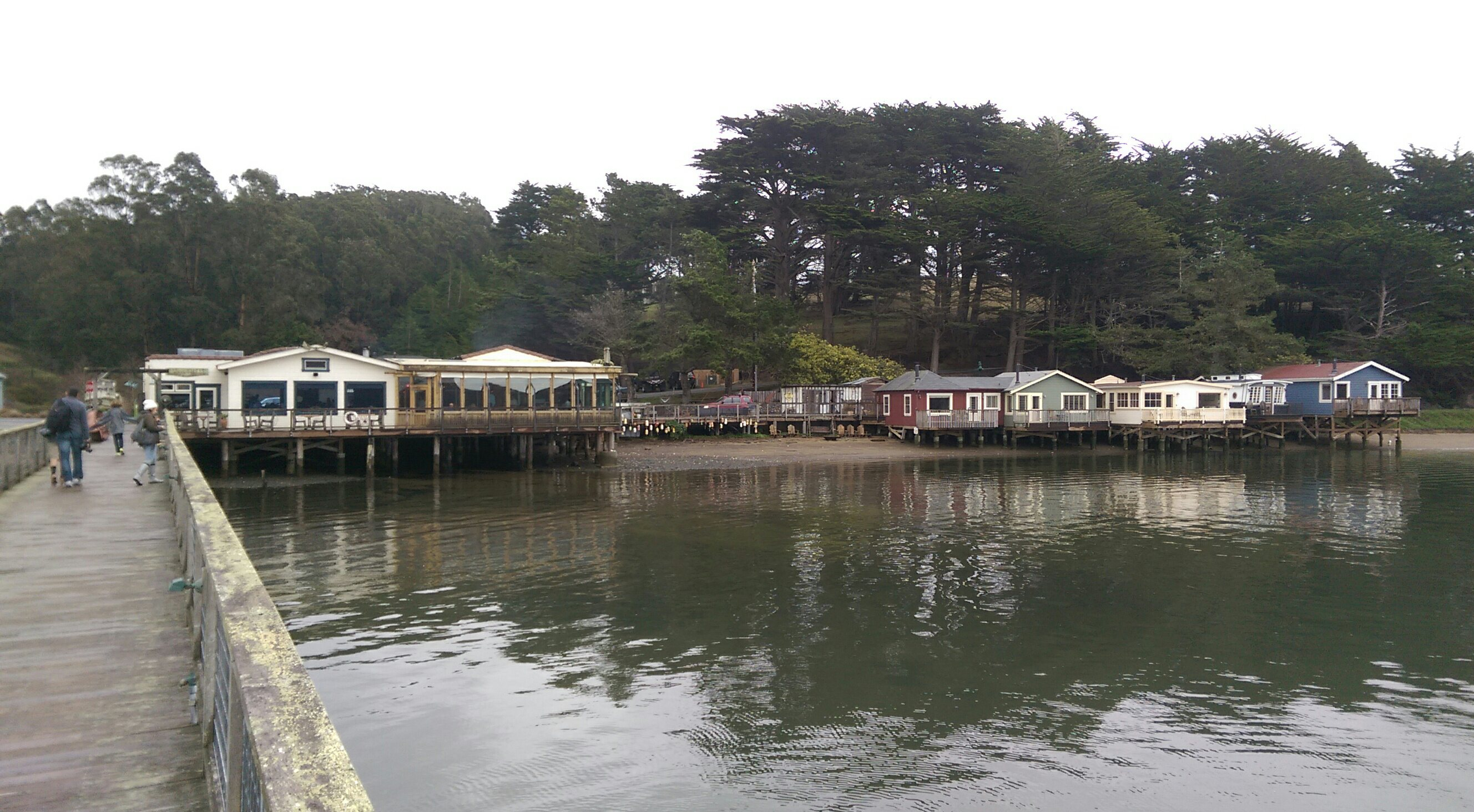

- Location in California Nick's Cove (the United States)
- Coordinates: 38°11′59″N 122°55′16″W
- Country: United States
- State: California
- County: Marin County
- Elevation: 6.6 ft (2 m)

Nick's Cove is the site of a long-standing restaurant and vacation camp in Marin County, California. It is on the northeast shore of Tomales Bay 3.25 miles (5.2 km) south-southwest of Tomales, at an elevation of 7 feet (2 m). Hog Island is in the middle of Tomales Bay, to the west of Nick's Cove, and Point Reyes National Seashore constitutes the western landmass on the opposite side of the bay.

The name honors Nick Kojich, who in 1931 opened a seafood restaurant at this location, which is still in operation.

== History ==
The land was originally settled by the Coast Miwok people. In 1835, a Mexican land grant called Rancho Nicasio was granted to the Miwoks, consisting of 56,807 acres (230 km^{2}). U.S. Army officer Henry Halleck, later a Union Army general during the Civil War, gained ownership of the majority of the rancho in 1850.

Croatian immigrants began settling in and around Marshall, California, a few miles south of what is now Nick's Cove, in 1900. The Markovich brothers, who were Croatian fishermen, operated on Tomales Bay near what later became Nick's Cove in the 1920s. By 1930, there was a small facility for packing smoked herring at the cove. Nick Kojic arrived in the area in 1920, and in 1931, opened a seafood stand in a former herring smokehouse. When Prohibition ended in 1933, he opened a bar. He called the business Nick's Cove. He also rented small cabins and cottages to tourists. Over the years, the business was owned successively by the Matkovich and Gibson families. The bar burned in 1950 but was soon rebuilt. The business closed in the early 1990s.

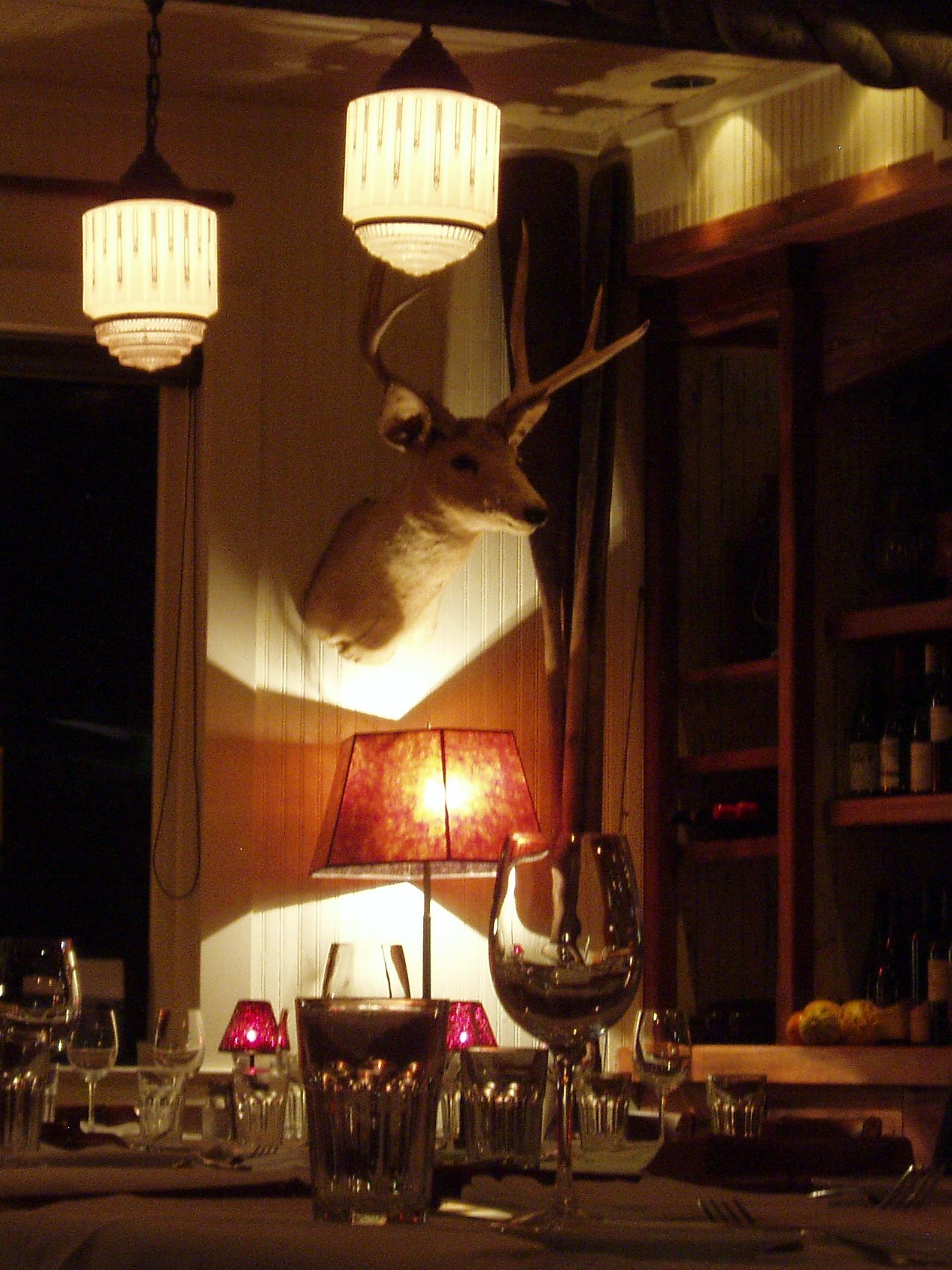
Restaurant interior in 2007 as designed by Pat Kuleto

== Modern reincarnation ==
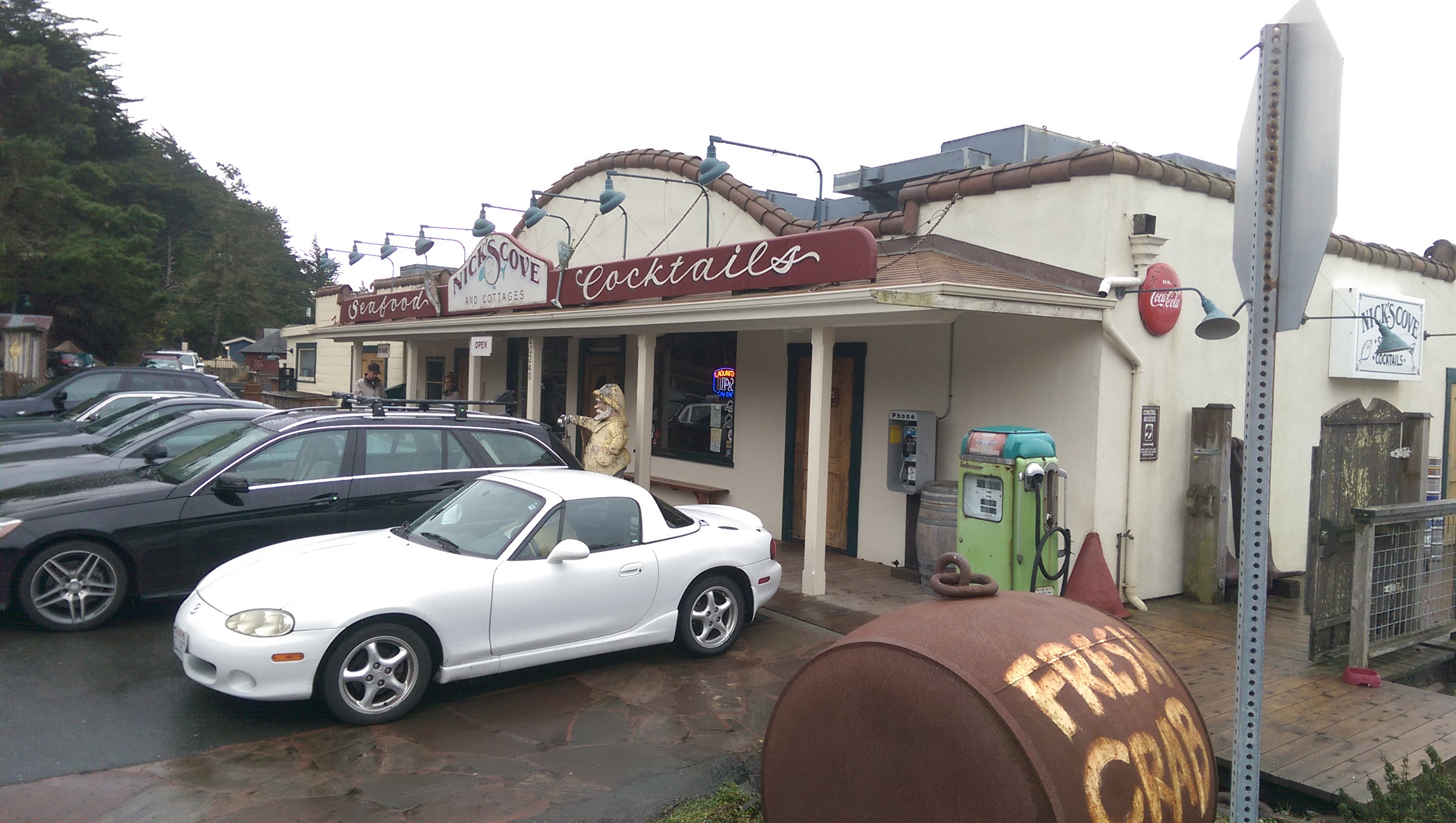
Restaurant at Nick's Cove

In 1999, restaurant developer Pat Kuleto purchased the property in conjunction with chef Mark Franz. It took them and their investors eight years to completely rebuild and modernize the facility at a cost of US$14 million. They encountered major environmental challenges as a stream flows beneath the restaurant's kitchen, and specimens of the California red-legged frog, a threatened species, were found on the site.

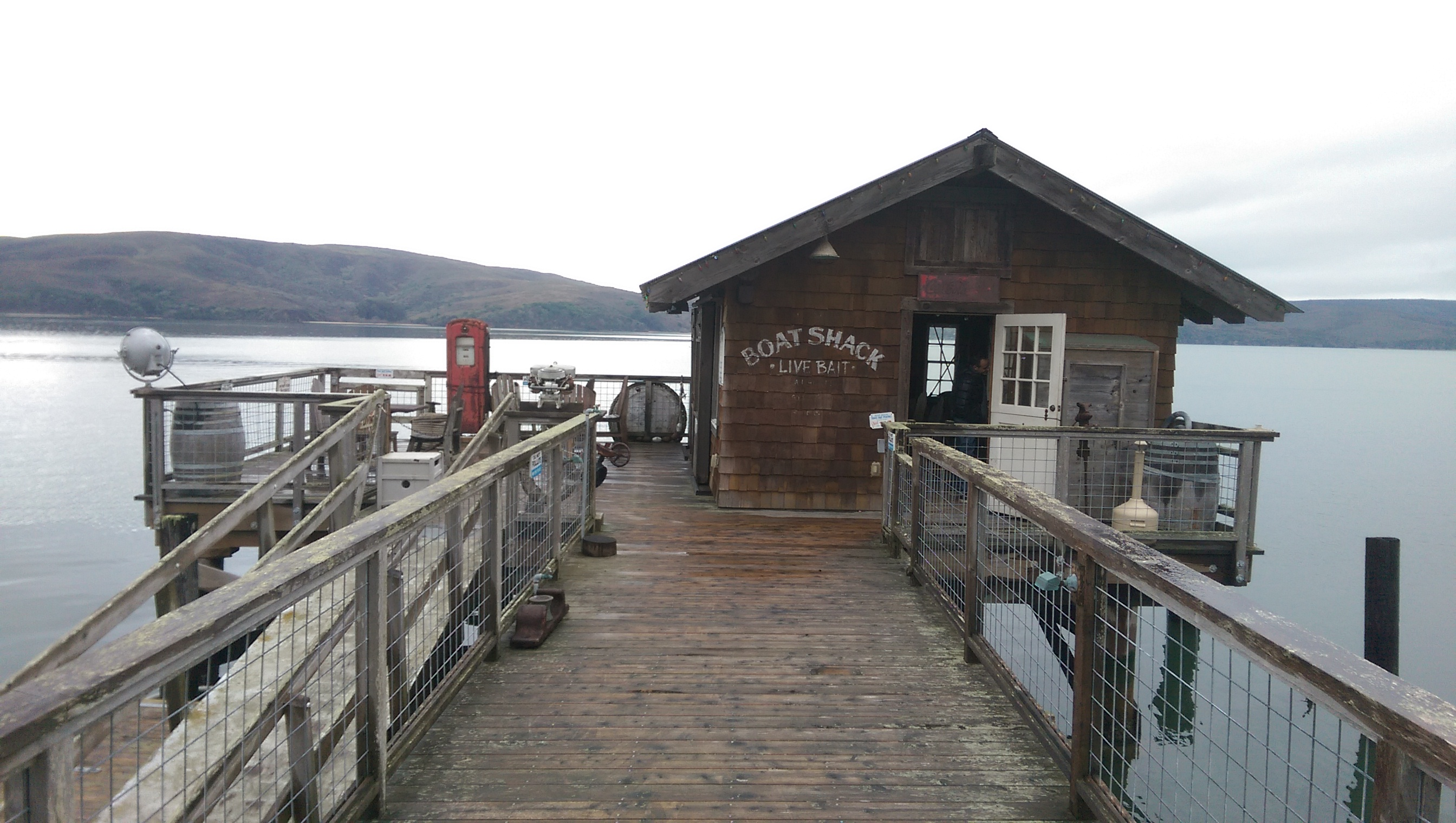
The boat shack at Nick's Cove is at the end of a 400-foot pier.

Nick's Cove re-opened in 2007, with a 130-seat restaurant and 12 luxury cottages, just as the Great Recession was beginning. Saddled with the burden of $13 million in debt during a time of economic insecurity, the venture was unable to become profitable.

In a letter to investors, Kuleto said that the venture had been a "complete disaster," with the result being a "complete loss of your financial investment." Kuleto's own losses were $5 million.

The business was sold to Highway 1 Hospitality LLC in 2011, and is still in operation.

In 2024, the boat shack at the end of the pier was destroyed by fire.
