= William McCormick (diplomat) =

American businessman and diplomat (born 1939)

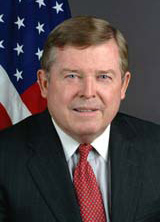

United States Ambassador to New Zealand
- In office October 21, 2005 – December 20, 2008
- President: George W. Bush
- Preceded by: Charles Swindells
- Succeeded by: David Huebner

United States Ambassador to Samoa
- In office October 21, 2005 – December 20, 2008
- President: George W. Bush
- Preceded by: Charles Swindells
- Succeeded by: David Huebner

Personal details
- Born: William Paul McCormick; August 18, 1939 (age 86) Providence, Rhode Island, U.S.
- Children: 6
- Education: Roger Williams University; Boston University

William Paul McCormick (born August 18, 1939) is an American businessman and diplomat who served as the United States ambassador to New Zealand and Samoa from October 21, 2005 until December 20, 2008.

== Biography ==
McCormick attended Roger Williams University and Boston University while serving in the United States Army Reserve Military Police until he was honorably discharged in 1963. He then moved to northern California and worked in the brokerage office of Connecticut General Life Insurance Companyin San Francisco until 1965. It was at this time that he became a partner in the Refectory Steak House Restaurant chain. By the early 1970s McCormick had moved further north to Portland, Oregon, and sold his interest in the Refectory Restaurants.

In 1971, he purchased the restaurant Jake's Famous Crawfish and within the year had partnered with Doug Schmick. While growing the restaurant company, he attended the Harvard Business School, Executive Management Program, in 1979. At that time, there were 60 McCormick & Schmick's Seafood Restaurants in 22 states employing over 8,000 people. McCormick and Schmick's is owned by Landry's, Inc.

Throughout his business career McCormick's civic and charitable involvement was far-reaching. For example, he has provided thousands of pounds of food for the Pasadena, California, food bank and 11,000 books for disadvantaged children in Los Angeles County. He began the Shamrock Run twenty-seven years ago for the benefit of many service organizations in Portland, Oregon. McCormick was awarded the Secretary's Award by the United States Department of Veterans Affairs for his contributions to, and recognition of, the nation's veterans. Each year McCormick & Schmick Seafood Restaurants provides over 17,000 complimentary meals to veterans visiting any McCormick & Schmick Restaurant on Veterans Day.

As co-chair of the Portland Opera Foundation, he was successful in raising $24 million to help sustain that organization in the future. Under President George W. Bush, McCormick served on the President's Committee of the Arts & Humanities, whose Honorary chairman is First Lady of the United States, then Laura Bush.

== Personal life ==
He is married and has six children.

Diplomatic posts
Preceded by Charles J. Swindells	U.S. Ambassador to New Zealand; Also accredited to Samoa; 2005–2008	Succeeded by David Huebner
