= McCormick & Schmick's =

American seafood restaurant chain

McCormick & Schmick's Seafood Restaurants
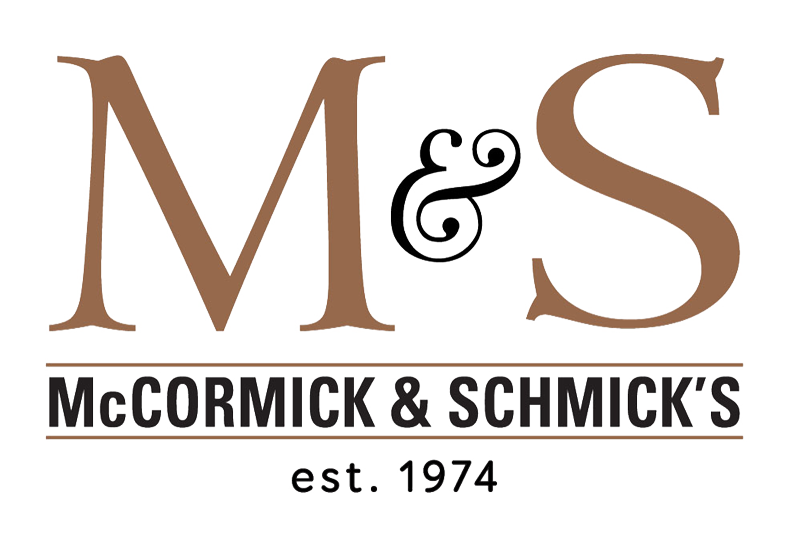
- Type: Subsidiary
- Industry: Restaurant and catering
- Predecessor: Traditional Concepts
- Founded: 1979; 47 years ago
- Founder: Bill McCormick & Douglas Schmick
- Headquarters: Houston, Texas, U.S.
- Number of locations: 15
- Key people: William T. Freeman (CEO); Michelle M. Lantow (CFO)
- Revenue: ▲$414.7 million (2022)
- Operating income: ▼ -$20.8 million (2010)
- Net income: ▼ -$23.1 million (2010)
- Total assets: ▼$157.8 million (2010)
- Total equity: ▼$70.4 million (2010)
- Number of employees: 6582 (2011)
- Parent: Landry's, Inc. (2011-present)
- Subsidiaries: The Boathouse (in Canada)
- Website: mccormickandschmicks.com

McCormick & Schmick's Seafood Restaurants Inc. is an American seafood restaurant chain, formerly based in Portland, Oregon. As of December 2024, the company operates 15 locations and one catering service in the United States and one Canadian location that operates under the Boathouse name. A sale to the parent company, Landry's, Inc., was completed in January 2012. Landry's corporate headquarters in Houston, Texas now manages all restaurant operations.

== History ==
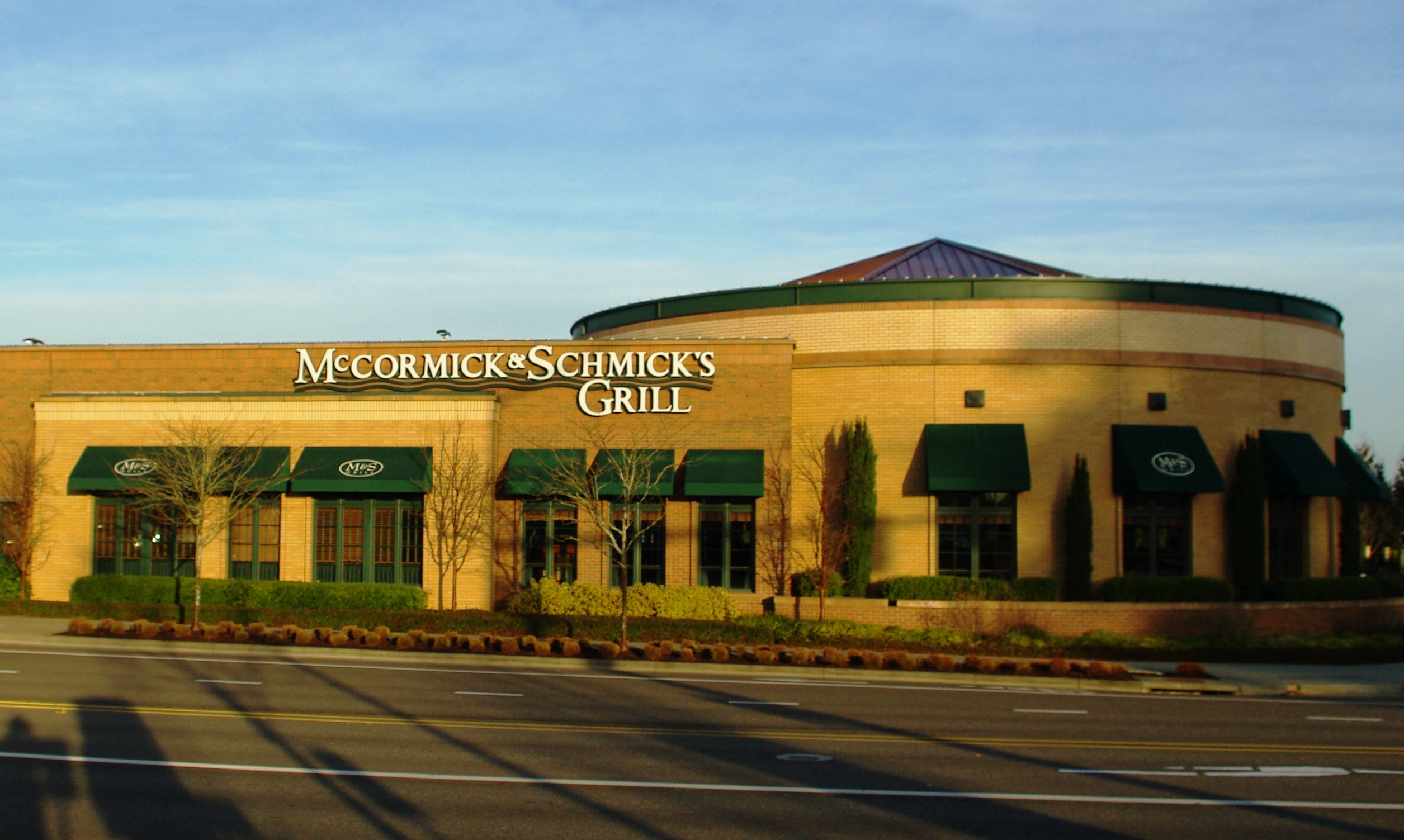
M&S Grill in Tigard, Oregon

The company dates its roots back to the 1970s, with Bill McCormick's purchase of Jake's Famous Crawfish, a 100-plus-year-old restaurant in Portland, Oregon. McCormick hired Douglas Schmick for management, and the two formed Traditional Concepts in 1974, the precursor to the McCormick & Schmick's restaurants.

The original McCormick & Schmick's restaurant was opened in 1979 in Portland. This 9,400-square-foot (870 m^{2}) location in downtown was located in the Henry Failing Building.

In February 1997, the company was acquired by Apple South for $53 million.

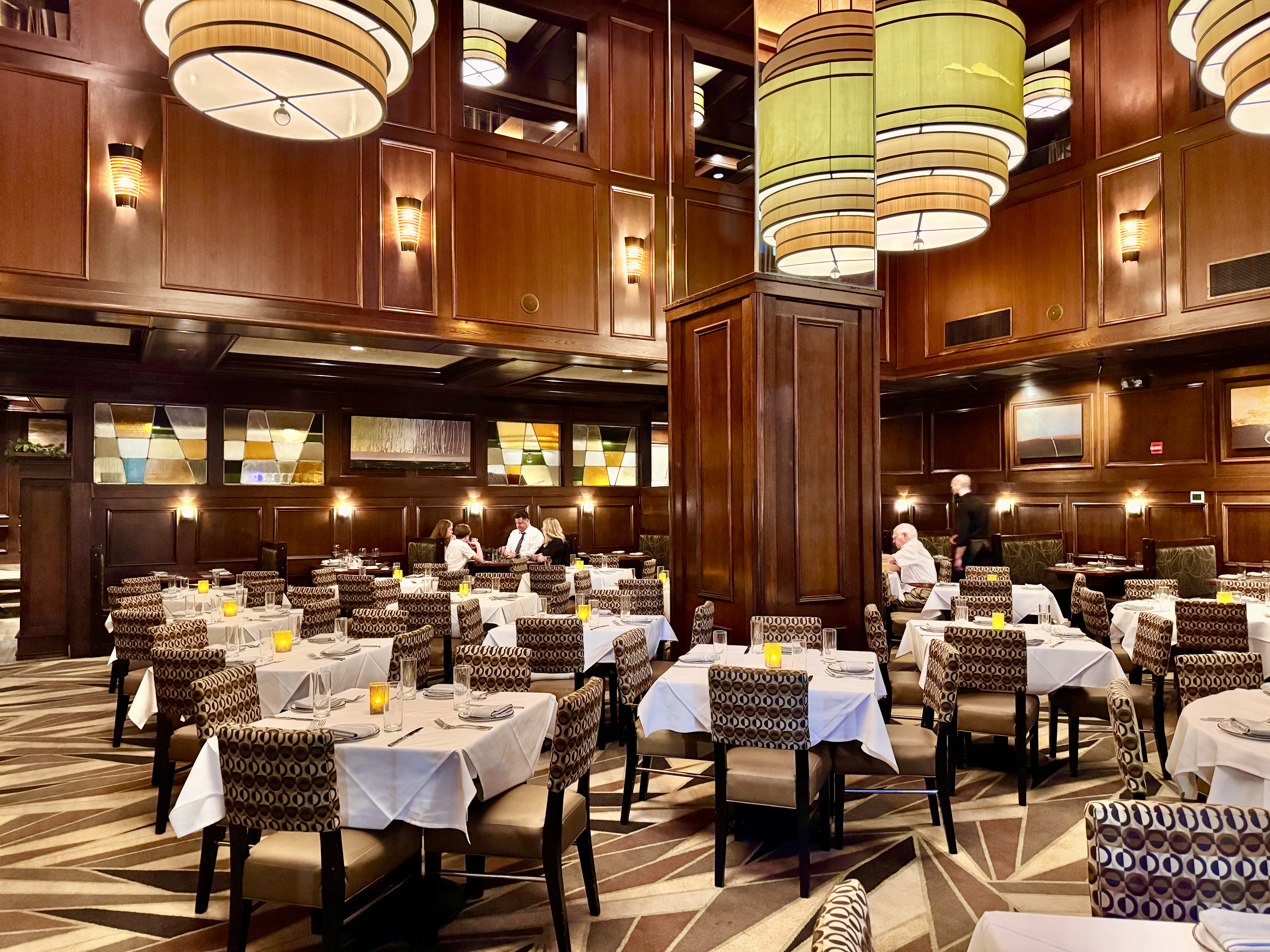
McCormick & Schmick's interior in Philadelphia

In 2004, the company became a publicly traded company after an initial public offering. As of 2009, there were almost 100 restaurants and catering locations in the United States and Canada. In June 2009, the company closed the original location in Portland. The chain is famous for its generous happy hour and landmark $1.95 half-pound cheeseburger. The price was changed to $2.95 in the spring of 2009.

On April 4, 2011, Tilman J. Fertitta, who was already the company's single largest individual shareholder (less than 10%), made a bid to take McCormick & Schmick's private, offering $9.25 per share for the company's outstanding shares, a 30 percent premium over its April 1 closing price. An offer of $8.75 per share was accepted by McCormick & Schmick's board in November 2011, with the purchase expected to be completed by January 2012. Operations would be merged into Landry's Restaurants. However, Fertitta expected to "keep some sort of an office in Portland." The sale to the conglomerate was completed in January 2012, and the once publicly traded company was removed from the NASDAQ exchange after trading under the MSSR symbol from 2004 until 2012.

== See also ==
- List of seafood restaurants
- List of oyster bars
