= Gilbert Marks =

British silversmith (1861-1905)

- Born: Gilbert Leigh Marks; 1 April 1861; Croydon
- Died: 5 February 1905
- Occupation: Silversmith

Gilbert Leigh Marks (1 April 1861 – 5 February 1905) was an English silversmith, who worked in the Arts and Crafts style, during a career of little over ten years.

== Early life ==
Marks was born on 1 April 1861 in Croydon, Surrey (now London), the son of John G. Marks. His family included a number of successful artists, including Henry Stacy Marks (1829–1898) and Frederick Walker (1840–1875), both uncles, and William Walker, his great-grandfather. His grandfather was the jeweller W. H. Walker.

His early career included roles as a clerk (not, as might be expected, as an apprentice silversmith) to a firm of silversmiths, rising to be a manager at a wool merchants, Masurel & Fils (still extant, as Segard Masurel).

In 1888, while still at Masurel & Fils, he married Florence Elizabeth Ford.

== Career ==
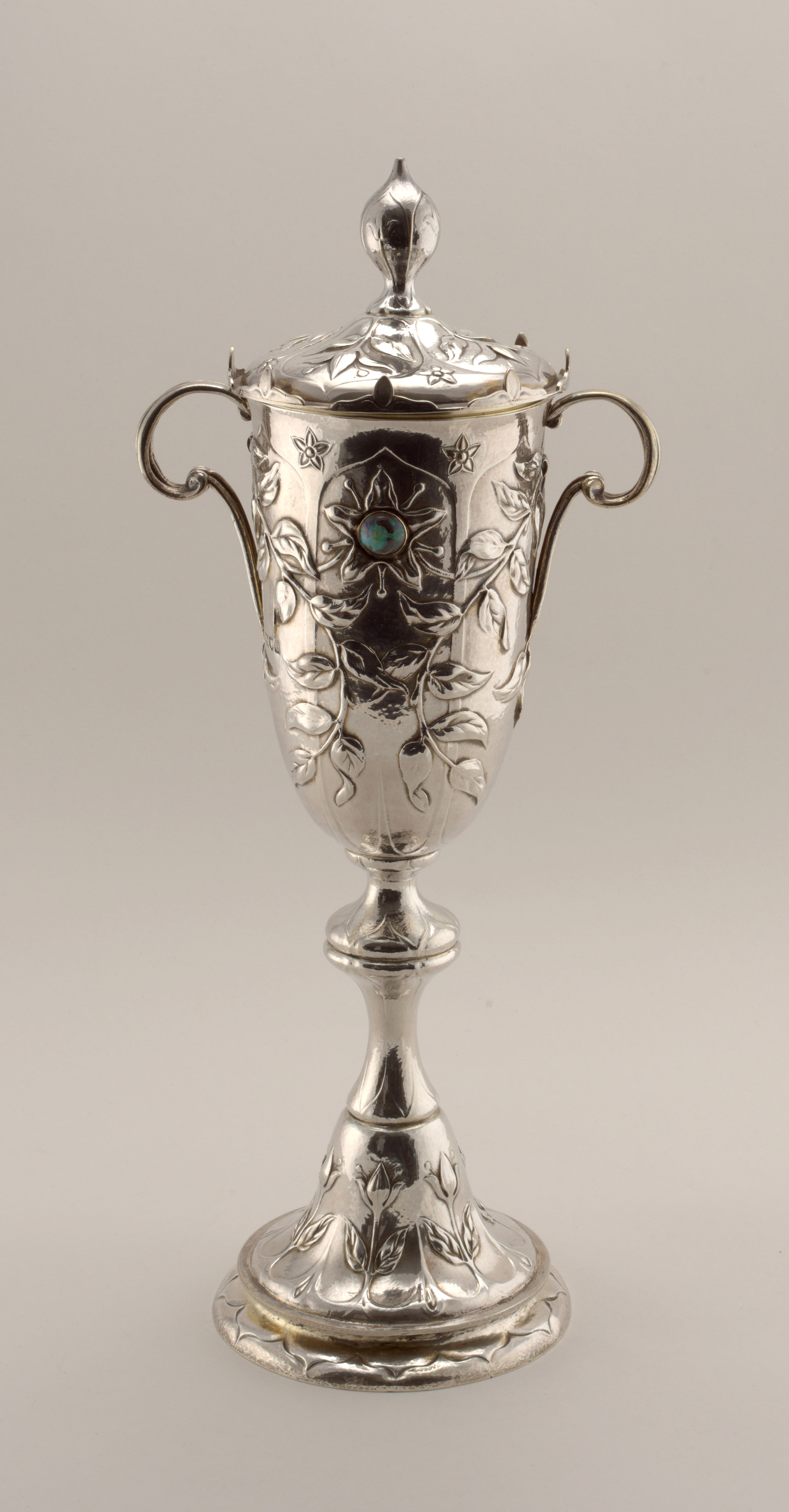
A standing cup and cover (1900–01) by Marks, now in the Cooper Hewitt, Smithsonian Design Museum

Marks gave his first solo exhibition in 1895, at the jewellers Johnson, Walker & Tolhurst, 80 Aldersgate Street, in the City of London. He exhibited there regularly, until 1901. Between 1897 and 1903 exhibited at the Royal Academy, Walker Art Gallery, Glasgow Institute of the Fine Arts, and Leeds City Art Gallery. He had a solo show at the Fine Art Society in London in May 1899.

His maker's mark, his initials 'GM', was registered at Goldsmiths' Hall in 1896.

In 1897 he made the body of a silver casket, to a design by George Frampton, for the Skinner's Company (subsequently presented to the Speaker of the House of Commons, William Court Gully. Frampton made the enamelled lid. It is now in the Victoria and Albert Museum.

His own silver work, in the Arts and Crafts style, was characterised by being unpolished and unturned, so still showing the marks left by his tools. He designed all his own pieces, which were produced by hand, without the use of dies, and with no piece duplicated. They were decorated with repoussé subjects from nature, such as flowers, fruit, and leaves, or, on later works, fish or lizards. and were occasionally embellished with semi-precious stones. He also produced a few works in pewter, and on at last one occasion, a casket in patinated steel, with bronze and silver inlay. His clients included Edward VII, for whom he made cups and bowls, and Croydon Borough Council, for whom he made the official ceremonial mace.

He died on 5 February 1905, aged 43, after a long period of ill health. His estate was valued at probate at £3,120 14s 7d.

== Legacy ==
Marks' works are in a number of significant collections, including those of the Worshipful Company of Goldsmiths, the Worshipful Company of Pewterers, the Honourable Society of the Inner Temple, the Victoria and Albert Museum, the Fitzwilliam Museum (two silver pieces and four in pewter), the Cooper Hewitt, Smithsonian Design Museum and the Museum of New Zealand Te Papa Tongarewa.

The Worshipful Company of Goldsmiths say he was "regarded as one of the most skilled silversmith of his generation". An obituary by Marion Spielmann in The Burlington Magazine estimated that his entire production "cannot fall far short of 750 or 800 pieces". and described him as:

an artist of delicate grace and charm, whose name will probably take high rank in the estimation of the collector and connoisseur.
