= 1894 United States gubernatorial elections =

- November 6, 1894 (Note: Alabama, Arkansas, Georgia, Maine, Oregon, Rhode Island and Vermont held early elections.)

28 governorships
	Majority party	Minority party
Party	Republican	Democratic
Seats before	16	25
Seats after	23	19
Seat change	▲7	▼6
Seats up	12	13
Seats won	19	7
	Third party	Fourth party
Party	Populist	Silver
Seats before	3	0
Seats after	1	1
Seat change	▼2	▲1
Seats up	3	0
Seats won	1	1
- Democratic gain Democratic hold Republican gain Republican hold Populist gain Silver gain

United States gubernatorial elections were held in 1894, in 28 states, concurrent with the House and Senate elections, on November 6, 1894 (except in Alabama, Arkansas, Georgia, Maine, Oregon, Rhode Island and Vermont, which held early elections).

In New York, the governor was elected to a two-year term for the first time, instead of a three-year term.

== Results ==
State	Incumbent	Party	Status	Opposing candidates
Alabama (held, 6 August 1894)	Thomas G. Jones	Democratic	Retired, Democratic victory	William C. Oates (Democratic) 57.10% Reuben F. Kolb (Populist) 42.90%
Arkansas (held, 3 September 1894)	William Meade Fishback	Democratic	Retired, Democratic victory	James Paul Clarke (Democratic) 58.91% Harmon L. Remmel (Republican) 20.54% David E. Barker (Populist) 19.33% J. W. Miller (Prohibition) 1.22%
California	Henry Markham	Republican	Retired, Democratic victory	James Budd (Democratic) 39.34% Morris M. Estee (Republican) 38.92% J. V. Webster (Populist) 18.03% Henry French (Prohibition) 3.71%
Colorado	Davis Hanson Waite	Populist	Defeated, 41.38%	Albert McIntire (Republican) 51.66% Charles S. Thomas (Democratic) 4.61% George Richardson (Prohibition) 2.35%
Connecticut	Luzon B. Morris	Democratic	Retired, Republican victory	Owen Vincent Coffin (Republican) 54.18% Ernest Cady (Democratic) 42.77% DeWitt C. Pond (Prohibition) 1.49% Edwin C. Bingham (Populist) 1.00% James F. Tuckey (Socialist Labor) 0.55% Scattering 0.01%
Delaware	Robert J. Reynolds	Democratic	Term-limited, Democratic victory	Joshua H. Marvil (Republican) 50.81% Ebe W. Tunnell (Democratic) 47.69% Thomas J. Perry (Prohibition) 1.51%
Georgia (held, 3 October 1894)	William J. Northen	Democratic	Term-limited, Democratic victory	William Yates Atkinson (Democratic) 55.54% James K. Hines (Populist) 44.46%
Idaho	William J. McConnell	Republican	Re-elected, 41.51%	James W. Ballantine (Populist) 28.96% Edward A. Stevenson (Democratic) 28.70% Henry C. McFarland (Prohibition) 0.83%
Kansas	Lorenzo D. Lewelling	Populist (Note: Contemporary sources indicate Lewelling ran under a fusion ticket between the Democrats and the Populist Party.)	Defeated, 39.54%	Edmund Needham Morrill (Republican) 49.69% David Overmyer (Democratic) 8.93% I. O. Pickering (Prohibition) 1.84%
Maine (held, 10 September 1894)	Henry B. Cleaves	Republican	Re-elected, 64.32%	Charles Fletcher Johnson (Democratic) 28.21% Luther C. Bateman (Populist) 4.94% Ira G. Hersey (Prohibition) 2.52%
Massachusetts	Frederic T. Greenhalge	Republican	Re-elected, 56.45%	John E. Russell (Democratic) 36.95% Alfred W. Richardson (Prohibition) 2.97% George H. Cary (Populist) 2.69% David G. Taylor (Socialist Labor) 0.93%
Michigan	John T. Rich	Republican	Re-elected, 56.89%	Spencer O. Fisher (Democratic) 31.37% Alva M. Nichols (Populist) 7.20% Albert M. Todd (Prohibition) 4.51% Scattering 0.04%
Minnesota	Knute Nelson	Republican	Re-elected, 49.94%	Sidney M. Owen (Populist) 29.67% George Loomis Becker (Democratic) 18.09% Hans S. Hilleboe (Prohibition) 2.31%
Nebraska	Lorenzo Crounse	Republican	Retired, Populist victory	Silas A. Holcomb (Populist) (Note: Holcomb ran under a fusion ticket between the Democrats and the Populist Party.) 47.98% Thomas Jefferson Majors (Republican) 46.41% P. Sturdevant (Straight-Out Democrat) 3.43% E. A. Gerrard (Prohibition) 2.18%
Nevada	Roswell K. Colcord	Republican	[data missing]	John Edward Jones (Silver) 49.87% Abner Coburn Cleveland (Republican) 36.87% George Peckham (Populist) 6.79% Theodore Winters (Democratic) 6.47%
New Hampshire	John Butler Smith	Republican	Retired, Republican victory	Charles A. Busiel (Republican) 55.98% Henry O. Kent (Democratic) 40.89% Daniel C. Knowles (Prohibition) 2.11% George D. Epps (Populist) 1.00% Scattering 0.03%
New York	Roswell P. Flower	Democratic	Retired, Republican victory	Levi P. Morton (Republican) 52.82% David B. Hill (Democratic) 40.58% Everett P. Wheeler (Reform Democrat) 2.13% Francis E. Baldwin (Prohibition) 1.84% Charles H. Matchett (Socialist Labor) 1.24% Charles B. Matthews (Populist) 0.87% Scattering 0.51%
North Dakota	Eli C. D. Shortridge	Populist (Note: Shortridge ran under a fusion ticket between the Democrats and the Populist Party.)	Retired, Republican victory	Roger Allin (Republican) 57.49% Elmer D. Wallace (Populist) 22.67% F. M. Kinter (Democratic) 19.84% (Note: Some sources mention a fourth candidate called Reeves, but this candidate in fact stood for North Dakota's at-large congressional district)
Oregon (held, 4 June 1894)	Sylvester Pennoyer	Democratic	Term limited, Republican victory	William Paine Lord (Republican) 47.23% Nathan Pierce (Populist) 29.99% William Galloway (Democratic) 20.51% James Kennedy (Prohibition) 2.26%
Pennsylvania	Robert E. Pattison	Democratic	Term limited, Republican victory	Daniel H. Hastings (Republican) 60.32% William M. Singerly (Democratic) 34.98% Charles L. Hawley (Prohibition) 2.46% Jerome T. Ailman (Populist) 2.04% Thomas H. Grundy (Socialist Labor) 0.18% Scattering 0.01%
Rhode Island (held, 4 April 1894)	D. Russell Brown	Republican	Re-elected, 53.15%	David S. Baker (Democratic) 41.28% Henry B. Metcalf (Prohibition) 4.08% Charles G. Baylor (Socialist Labor) 1.08% Henry A. Burlingame (Populist) 0.41%
South Carolina	Benjamin Tillman	Democratic	Retired to run for U.S. Senate, Democratic victory	John Gary Evans (Democratic) 69.57% Sampson Pope (Populist) 30.43%
South Dakota	Charles H. Sheldon	Republican	Re-elected, 52.64%	Isaac Howe (Populist) 34.63% James A. Ward (Democratic) 11.41% M. H. Alexander (Prohibition) 1.32%
Tennessee	Peter Turney	Democratic	Re-elected after disputed election	(Original result); Henry Clay Evans (Republican) 45.20% Peter Turney (Democratic) 44.87% A. L. Mims (Populist) 9.93% (Result declared by General Assembly); Peter Turney (Democratic) 45.06% Henry Clay Evans (Republican) 43.94% A. L. Mims (Populist) 11.00%
Texas	Jim Hogg	Democratic	Retired, Democratic victory	Charles A. Culberson (Democratic) 49.01% Thomas L. Nugent (Populist) 36.13% W. K. Makemason (Republican) 12.90% J. B. Schmitz (Lily-White Republican) 1.19% J. M. Dunn (Prohibition) 0.52% Scattering 0.25%
Vermont (held, 4 September 1894)	Levi K. Fuller	Republican	Retired, Republican victory	Urban A. Woodbury (Republican) 73.54% George W. Smith (Democratic) 24.38% Thomas S. McGinnis (Populist) 1.28% Rodney Whittemore (Prohibition) 0.79% Scattering 0.02%
Wisconsin	George Wilbur Peck	Democratic	Defeated, 37.89%	William H. Upham (Republican) 52.24% D. Frank Powell (Populist) 6.82% John F. Cleghorn (Prohibition) 2.99% Scattering 0.05%
Wyoming	John Eugene Osborne (Note: Osborne ran under a fusion ticket between the Democrats and the Populist Party.)	Democratic	[data missing]	William A. Richards (Republican) 52.61% William H. Holliday (Democratic) 36.11% Lewis C. Tidball (Populist) 11.28%

== See also ==
- 1894 United States elections

== Bibliography ==
- Glashan, Roy R. (1979). American Governors and Gubernatorial Elections, 1775-1978. Meckler Books. ISBN 0-930466-17-9.
- Gubernatorial Elections, 1787-1997. Washington, D.C.: Congressional Quarterly Inc. 1998. ISBN 1-56802-396-0.
- Dubin, Michael J. (2014). United States Gubernatorial Elections, 1861-1911: The Official Results by State and County. Jefferson, North Carolina: McFarland. ISBN 978-0-7864-4722-0.
- The World Almanac and Encyclopedia, 1895. New York, NY: The Press Publishing Co. 1895.
- McPherson, Edward, ed. (1895). The Tribune Almanac and Political Register for 1895. New York, NY: The Tribune Association.
