= 1892 United States presidential election in Tennessee =

- November 8, 1892

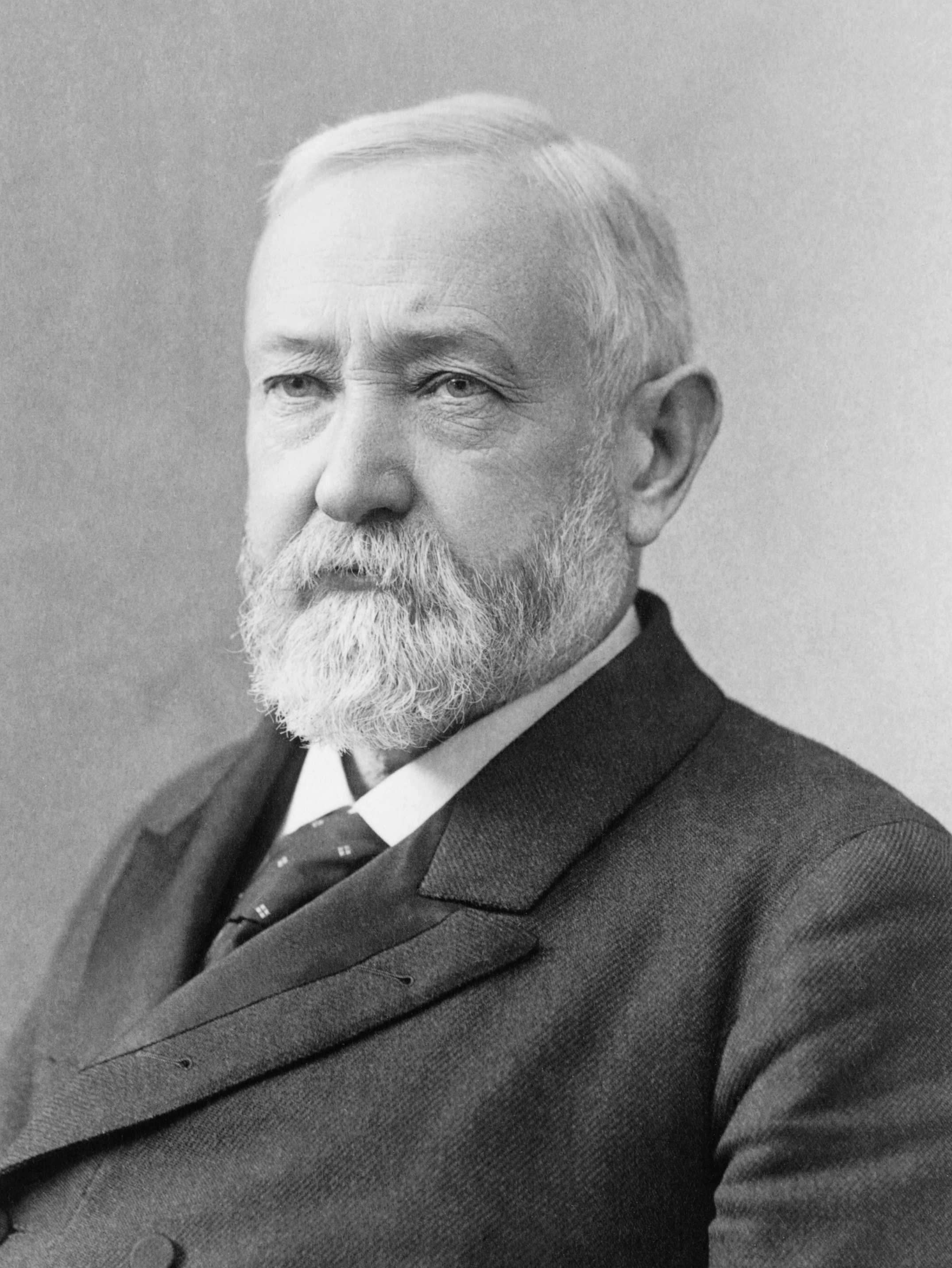

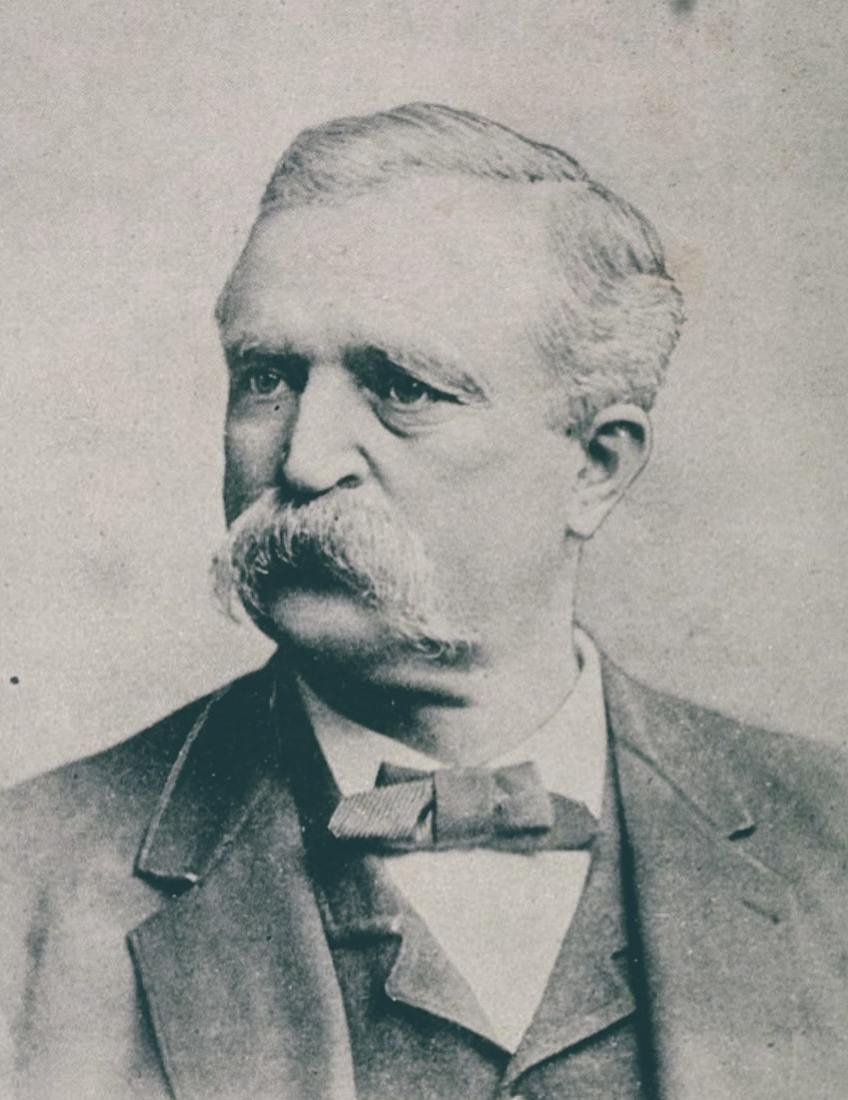
Nominee	Grover Cleveland	Benjamin Harrison	James B. Weaver
Party	Democratic	Republican	Populist
Home state	New York	Indiana	Iowa
Running mate	Adlai Stevenson I	Whitelaw Reid	James G. Field
Electoral vote	12	0	0
Popular vote	136,468	100,537	23,918
Percentage	51.36%	37.83%	9.00%
County results
Cleveland
40–50%
50–60%
60–70%
70–80%
80–90%
90–100%
Harrison
40–50%
50–60%
60–70%
70–80%
80–90%
President before election
Benjamin Harrison
Republican
Elected President
Grover Cleveland
Democratic

The 1892 United States presidential election in Tennessee took place on November 8, 1892. All contemporary 44 states were part of the 1892 United States presidential election. State voters chose twelve electors to the Electoral College, which selected the president and vice president.

For over a century after the Civil War, Tennessee's white citizenry was divided according to partisan loyalties established in that war. Unionist regions covering almost all of East Tennessee, Kentucky Pennyroyal-allied Macon County, and the five West Tennessee Highland Rim counties of Carroll, Henderson, McNairy, Hardin and Wayne voted Republican – generally by landslide margins – as they saw the Democratic Party as the “war party” who had forced them into a war they did not wish to fight. Contrariwise, the rest of Middle and West Tennessee who had supported and driven the state's secession was equally fiercely Democratic as it associated the Republicans with Reconstruction. After the state's white landowning class re-established its rule in the early 1870s, black and Unionist white combined to forge adequate support for the GOP to produce a competitive political system for two decades, although during this era the Republicans could only capture statewide offices when the Democratic Party was divided on this issue of payment of state debt.

White Democrats in West Tennessee were always aiming to eliminate black political influence, which they first attempted to do by election fraud in the middle 1880s and did so much more successfully at the end of the decade by instituting in counties with significant black populations a secret ballot that prevented illiterates voting, and a poll tax throughout the state.

At the time of the next presidential election, third-time Democratic nominee Grover Cleveland was extremely concerned with the lack of loyalty to the gold standard by Tennessee Democrats and the growing influence of the James B. Weaver-led Populist Party over the state, especially after Governor John P. Buchanan joined the Populists and ran for re-election under that party's banner However, the strong emphasis by Cleveland and running mate Adlai Stevenson I on opposing the Lodge Force Bill and on reducing tariffs was able to minimise defections to the Populists or the GOP – which with large Unionist areas was even with incomplete black disenfranchisement more viable than in any other ex-Confederate state. Stevenson's extensive tour of Tennessee and his campaign against the Populists ensured that the state was won comfortably against incumbent president and Republican nominee Benjamin Harrison, whose vote total declined by thirty-eight thousand or over a quarter due to the loss of black voters.

== Results ==
1892 United States presidential election in Tennessee
Party	Candidate	Votes	Percentage	Electoral votes
Democratic	Grover Cleveland	136,468	51.36%	12
Republican	Benjamin Harrison (incumbent)	100,537	37.83%	0
People's	James B. Weaver	23,918	9.00%	0
Prohibition	John Bidwell	4,809	1.81%	0
Totals		265,732	100.00%	12
Voter turnout				—

=== Results by county ===
1892 United States presidential election in Tennessee by county
County	Grover Cleveland Democratic		Benjamin Harrison Republican		James B. Weaver Populist		John Bidwell Prohibition		Margin		Total votes cast
County	#	%	#	%	#	%	#	%	#	%	Total votes cast
Anderson	607	30.40%	1,365	68.35%	23	1.15%	2	0.10%	-758	-37.96%	1,997
Bedford	2,154	56.55%	1,470	38.59%	115	3.02%	70	1.84%	684	17.96%	3,809
Benton	1,001	55.46%	563	31.19%	241	13.35%	0	0.00%	438	24.27%	1,805
Bledsoe	505	40.76%	720	58.11%	12	0.97%	2	0.16%	-215	-17.35%	1,239
Blount	821	28.36%	1,933	66.77%	64	2.21%	77	2.66%	-1,112	-38.41%	2,895
Bradley	871	34.63%	1,522	60.52%	68	2.70%	54	2.15%	-651	-25.88%	2,515
Campbell	513	24.19%	1,561	73.60%	42	1.98%	5	0.24%	-1,048	-49.41%	2,121
Cannon	1,092	65.27%	514	30.72%	63	3.77%	4	0.24%	578	34.55%	1,673
Carroll	1,636	38.11%	2,051	47.78%	552	12.86%	54	1.26%	-415	-9.67%	4,293
Carter	478	19.56%	1,877	76.80%	89	3.64%	0	0.00%	-1,399	-57.24%	2,444
Cheatham	732	47.32%	242	15.64%	554	35.81%	19	1.23%	178 (Note: In this county where Weaver ran second ahead of Harrison, margin given is Cleveland vote minus Weaver vote and percentage margin Cleveland percentage minus Weaver percentage.)	11.51%	1,547
Chester	738	49.13%	480	31.96%	267	17.78%	17	1.13%	258	17.18%	1,502
Claiborne	986	38.26%	1,437	55.76%	144	5.59%	10	0.39%	-451	-17.50%	2,577
Clay	743	58.87%	391	30.98%	96	7.61%	32	2.54%	352	27.89%	1,262
Cocke	874	31.96%	1,831	66.95%	22	0.80%	8	0.29%	-957	-34.99%	2,735
Coffee	1,415	64.14%	414	18.77%	297	13.46%	80	3.63%	1,001	45.38%	2,206
Crockett	1,271	53.14%	830	34.70%	261	10.91%	30	1.25%	441	18.44%	2,392
Cumberland	330	33.54%	632	64.23%	16	1.63%	6	0.61%	-302	-30.69%	984
Davidson	8,480	69.14%	2,993	24.40%	394	3.21%	398	3.25%	5,487	44.74%	12,265
DeKalb	1,377	48.21%	1,283	44.92%	129	4.52%	67	2.35%	94	3.29%	2,856
Decatur	860	53.35%	667	41.38%	85	5.27%	0	0.00%	193	11.97%	1,612
Dickson	1,385	62.73%	494	22.37%	312	14.13%	17	0.77%	891	40.35%	2,208
Dyer	1,848	62.01%	487	16.34%	599	20.10%	46	1.54%	1,249	41.91%	2,980
Fayette	2,167	71.71%	660	21.84%	191	6.32%	4	0.13%	1,507	49.87%	3,022
Fentress	223	24.86%	525	58.53%	149	16.61%	0	0.00%	-302	-33.67%	897
Franklin	1,896	60.27%	577	18.34%	596	18.94%	77	2.45%	1,300	41.32%	3,146
Gibson	3,085	55.90%	1,299	23.54%	924	16.74%	211	3.82%	1,786	32.36%	5,519
Giles	2,722	53.86%	1,551	30.69%	685	13.55%	96	1.90%	1,171	23.17%	5,054
Grainger	882	37.07%	1,342	56.41%	154	6.47%	1	0.04%	-460	-19.34%	2,379
Greene	2,299	42.94%	2,745	51.27%	100	1.87%	210	3.92%	-446	-8.33%	5,354
Grundy	779	73.56%	236	22.29%	26	2.46%	18	1.70%	543	51.27%	1,059
Hamblen	913	41.03%	1,164	52.31%	105	4.72%	43	1.93%	-251	-11.28%	2,225
Hamilton	3,762	51.25%	3,196	43.54%	156	2.13%	226	3.08%	566	7.71%	7,340
Hancock	421	27.37%	971	63.13%	140	9.10%	6	0.39%	-550	-35.76%	1,538
Hardeman	1,940	59.93%	789	24.37%	508	15.69%	0	0.00%	1,151	35.56%	3,237
Hardin	1,126	39.49%	1,537	53.91%	146	5.12%	42	1.47%	-411	-14.42%	2,851
Hawkins	1,710	46.98%	1,847	50.74%	75	2.06%	8	0.22%	-137	-3.76%	3,640
Haywood	1,676	65.52%	662	25.88%	220	8.60%	0	0.00%	1,014	39.64%	2,558
Henderson	1,044	40.48%	1,535	59.52%	0	0.00%	0	0.00%	-491	-19.04%	2,579
Henry	2,206	59.35%	963	25.91%	516	13.88%	32	0.86%	1,243	33.44%	3,717
Hickman	1,179	57.51%	554	27.02%	301	14.68%	16	0.78%	625	30.49%	2,050
Houston	704	69.98%	206	20.48%	83	8.25%	13	1.29%	498	49.50%	1,006
Humphreys	1,178	64.65%	243	13.34%	366	20.09%	35	1.92%	812	44.57%	1,822
Jackson	1,382	63.19%	457	20.90%	346	15.82%	2	0.09%	925	42.30%	2,187
James	263	32.35%	518	63.71%	28	3.44%	4	0.49%	-255	-31.37%	813
Jefferson	764	25.32%	2,058	68.21%	186	6.17%	9	0.30%	-1,294	-42.89%	3,017
Johnson	209	14.91%	1,100	78.46%	13	0.93%	80	5.71%	-891	-63.55%	1,402
Knox	3,987	46.82%	4,182	49.11%	140	1.64%	207	2.43%	-195	-2.29%	8,516
Lake	468	90.35%	6	1.16%	32	6.18%	12	2.32%	436	84.17%	518
Lauderdale	1,218	42.26%	967	33.55%	690	23.94%	7	0.24%	251	8.71%	2,882
Lawrence	1,231	58.23%	758	35.86%	86	4.07%	39	1.84%	473	22.37%	2,114
Lewis	231	63.81%	95	26.24%	34	9.39%	2	0.55%	136	37.57%	362
Lincoln	2,429	59.83%	590	14.53%	806	19.85%	235	5.79%	1,623	39.98%	4,060
Loudon	491	31.04%	1,037	65.55%	10	0.63%	44	2.78%	-546	-34.51%	1,582
Macon	648	35.31%	1,036	56.46%	151	8.23%	0	0.00%	-388	-21.14%	1,835
Madison	2,569	64.65%	900	22.65%	468	11.78%	37	0.93%	1,669	42.00%	3,974
Marion	1,201	44.32%	1,457	53.76%	47	1.73%	5	0.18%	-256	-9.45%	2,710
Marshall	2,185	64.36%	685	20.18%	402	11.84%	123	3.62%	1,500	44.18%	3,395
Maury	3,191	64.08%	1,357	27.25%	313	6.29%	119	2.39%	1,834	36.83%	4,980
McMinn	1,336	40.08%	1,842	55.27%	92	2.76%	63	1.89%	-506	-15.18%	3,333
McNairy	1,132	41.28%	1,143	41.68%	458	16.70%	9	0.33%	-11	-0.40%	2,742
Meigs	564	44.76%	561	44.52%	124	9.84%	11	0.87%	3	0.24%	1,260
Monroe	1,367	46.21%	1,414	47.80%	167	5.65%	10	0.34%	-47	-1.59%	2,958
Montgomery	2,405	44.25%	1,927	35.46%	983	18.09%	120	2.21%	478	8.79%	5,435
Moore	717	69.75%	62	6.03%	213	20.72%	36	3.50%	504	49.03%	1,028
Morgan	302	28.93%	681	65.23%	37	3.54%	24	2.30%	-379	-36.30%	1,044
Obion	2,694	59.56%	771	17.05%	987	21.82%	71	1.57%	1,707	37.74%	4,523
Overton	1,287	64.54%	586	29.39%	114	5.72%	7	0.35%	701	35.16%	1,994
Perry	710	61.69%	371	32.23%	68	5.91%	2	0.17%	339	29.45%	1,151
Pickett	398	47.78%	427	51.26%	0	0.00%	8	0.96%	-29	-3.48%	833
Polk	656	46.59%	694	49.29%	58	4.12%	0	0.00%	-38	-2.70%	1,408
Putnam	1,089	53.04%	682	33.22%	267	13.01%	15	0.73%	407	19.82%	2,053
Rhea	1,099	47.11%	1,163	49.85%	49	2.10%	22	0.94%	-64	-2.74%	2,333
Roane	804	26.46%	1,795	59.08%	178	5.86%	261	8.59%	-991	-32.62%	3,038
Robertson	1,938	53.04%	879	24.06%	604	16.53%	233	6.38%	1,059	28.98%	3,654
Rutherford	2,211	54.51%	1,210	29.83%	593	14.62%	42	1.04%	1,001	24.68%	4,056
Scott	156	10.86%	1,198	83.43%	76	5.29%	6	0.42%	-1,042	-72.56%	1,436
Sequatchie	376	64.83%	189	32.59%	15	2.59%	0	0.00%	187	32.24%	580
Sevier	461	15.38%	2,463	82.18%	44	1.47%	29	0.97%	-2,002	-66.80%	2,997
Shelby	6,307	81.67%	1,110	14.37%	277	3.59%	29	0.38%	5,197	67.29%	7,723
Smith	1,598	53.00%	847	28.09%	535	17.74%	35	1.16%	751	24.91%	3,015
Stewart	1,251	62.33%	387	19.28%	348	17.34%	21	1.05%	864	43.05%	2,007
Sullivan	2,281	58.17%	1,304	33.26%	239	6.10%	97	2.47%	977	24.92%	3,921
Sumner	2,121	58.74%	677	18.75%	775	21.46%	38	1.05%	1,346	37.27%	3,611
Tipton	2,199	62.33%	690	19.56%	639	18.11%	0	0.00%	1,509	42.77%	3,528
Trousdale	622	64.06%	240	24.72%	106	10.92%	3	0.31%	382	39.34%	971
Unicoi	87	14.77%	500	84.89%	2	0.34%	0	0.00%	-413	-70.12%	589
Union	457	23.99%	1,368	71.81%	79	4.15%	1	0.05%	-911	-47.82%	1,905
Van Buren	360	73.17%	89	18.09%	36	7.32%	7	1.42%	271	55.08%	492
Warren	1,568	59.98%	633	24.22%	367	14.04%	46	1.76%	935	35.77%	2,614
Washington	1,722	43.20%	2,056	51.58%	44	1.10%	164	4.11%	-334	-8.38%	3,986
Wayne	661	34.99%	1,156	61.20%	55	2.91%	17	0.90%	-495	-26.20%	1,889
Weakley	2,648	53.15%	1,644	33.00%	578	11.60%	112	2.25%	1,004	20.15%	4,982
White	1,273	56.15%	539	23.78%	399	17.60%	56	2.47%	734	32.38%	2,267
Williamson	1,992	64.86%	575	18.72%	353	11.49%	151	4.92%	1,417	46.14%	3,071
Wilson	2,523	61.72%	1,142	27.94%	321	7.85%	102	2.50%	1,381	33.78%	4,088
Totals	136,468	51.35%	100,577	37.84%	23,918	9.00%	4,809	1.81%	35.891	13.50%	265,772

== See also ==
- United States presidential elections in Tennessee
- 1892 Tennessee gubernatorial election
