= 1890 Tennessee gubernatorial election =

- November 4, 1890
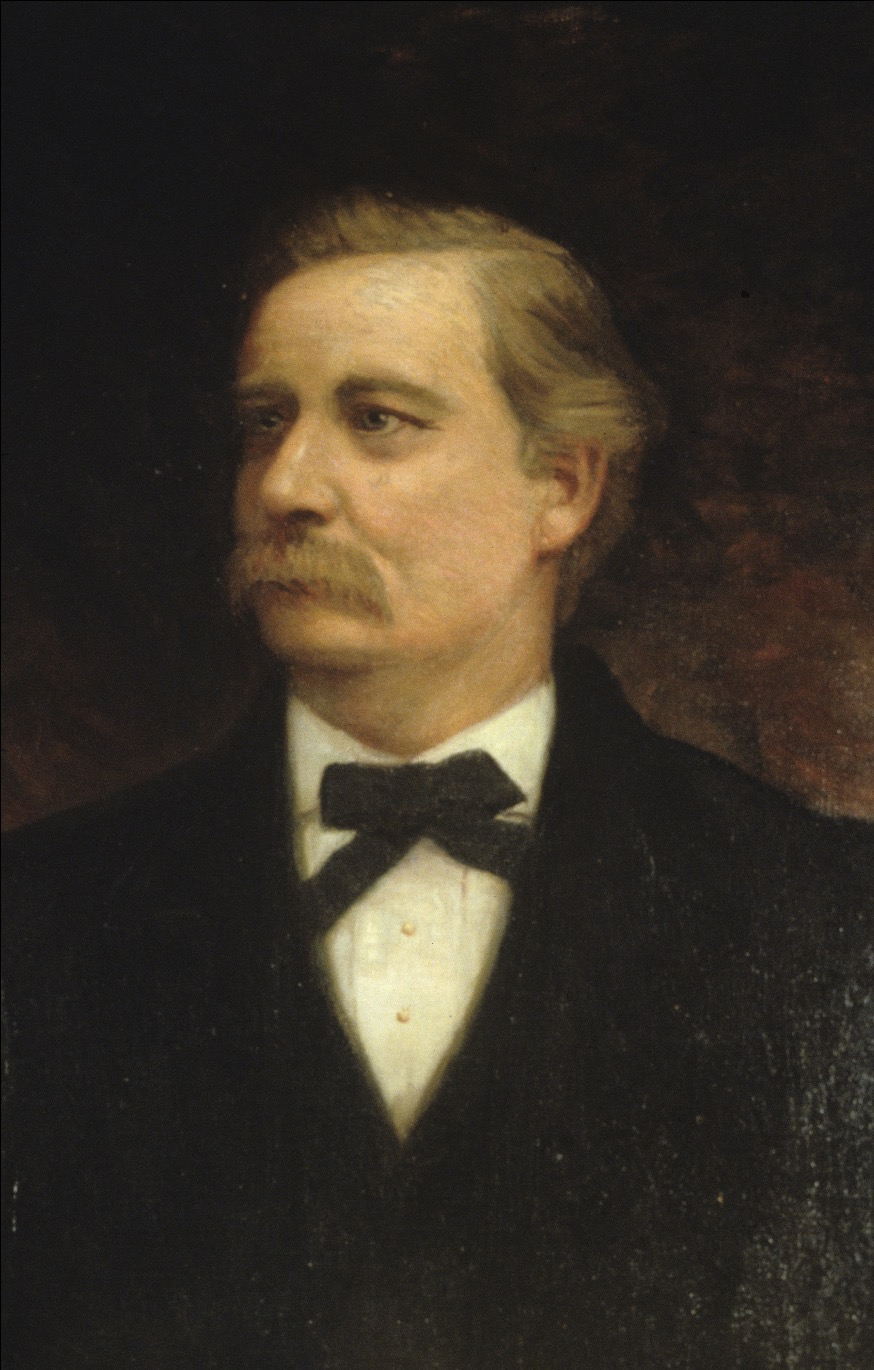

Nominee	John P. Buchanan	Lewis T. Baxter	David C. Kelley
Party	Democratic	Republican	Prohibition
Popular vote	113,549	76,081	11,082
Percentage	56.57%	37.91%	5.52%
- County results Buchanan: 40–50% 50–60% 60–70% 70–80% 80–90% Baxter: 40–50% 50–60% 60–70% 70–80% 80–90% No data
Governor before election
Robert Love Taylor
Democratic
Elected Governor
John P. Buchanan
Democratic

The 1890 Tennessee gubernatorial election was held on November 4, 1890. Incumbent Democratic Governor Robert Love Taylor did not seek re-election. Democratic nominee John P. Buchanan defeated Republican nominee Lewis T. Baxter and Prohibition nominee D. C. Kelley with 56.57% of the vote.

== Nominations ==
Nominations were made by party conventions.

=== Democratic nomination ===
The Democratic convention was held on July 15 to 18 at Nashville. John P. Buchanan was nominated by acclamation on the twenty-sixth ballot.

==== Candidate ====
- John P. Buchanan, President of the Tennessee Farmers' Alliance

==== Withdrew ====
- Jere Baxter, businessman (withdrew during 26th ballot)
- Josiah Patterson, former State Representative (withdrew during 26th ballot)
- John May Taylor, former U.S. Representative (withdrew after 23rd ballot)

==== Results ====
Partial results of the balloting were as follows (excluding fractions).

	Gubernatorial Ballot																			
	1st	2nd	3rd	4th	5th	6th	7th	8th	9th	10th	11th	15th	19th	20th	21st	22nd	23rd	24th	25th	26th
Buchanan	759	749	749	754	735		738		729	749	764	749	719	720	734	751		789	801	acclamation
Patterson	370	370	371	385	364		382		375	360	374	401	374	379	374	349		448	433	withdrew
Baxter	297	312	310	298	314		306		307	306	294	306	355	349	353	360		360	370	withdrew
Taylor	177	170	172	168	158		178		198	169	129	147	144	158	146	141		withdrew		
Turney											7									

=== Republican nomination ===
The Republican convention was held on July 30 at Nashville. Lewis T. Baxter was nominated by acclamation.

==== Candidate ====
- Lewis T. Baxter, banker

== General election ==
=== Candidates ===
- Lewis T. Baxter, Republican
- John P. Buchanan, Democratic
- Rev. David C. Kelley, Prohibition

=== Results ===
1890 Tennessee gubernatorial election
Party	Candidate	Votes	%	±%
Democratic	John P. Buchanan	113,549	56.57%	
Republican	Lewis T. Baxter	76,081	37.91%	
Prohibition	D. C. Kelley	11,082	5.52%	
Majority		37,468	18.66%	
Turnout		200,712	100.00%	
Democratic hold		Swing		

== Bibliography ==
- Glashan, Roy R. (1979). American Governors and Gubernatorial Elections, 1775-1978. Meckler Books. ISBN 0-930466-17-9.
