= 1896 Republican National Convention =

American political convention

- 1896 presidential election
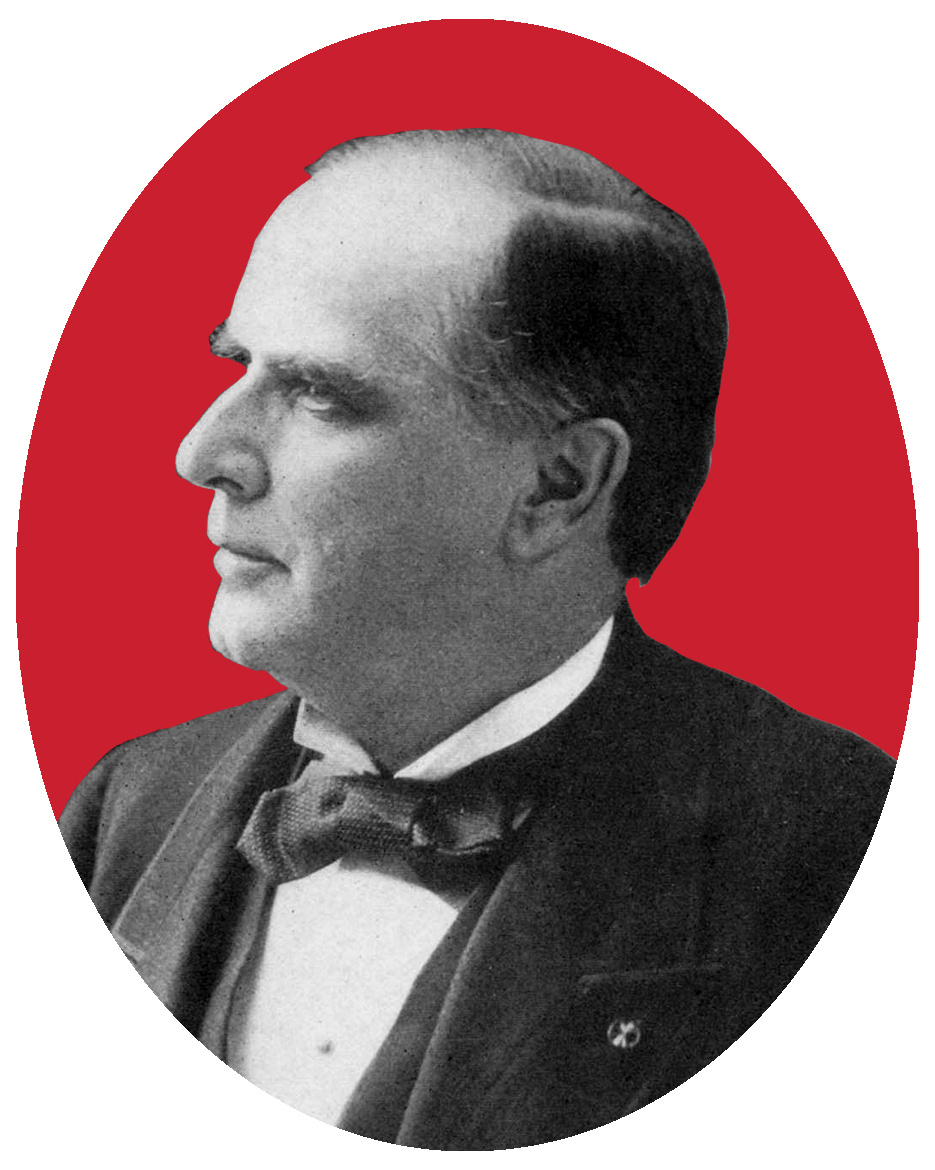
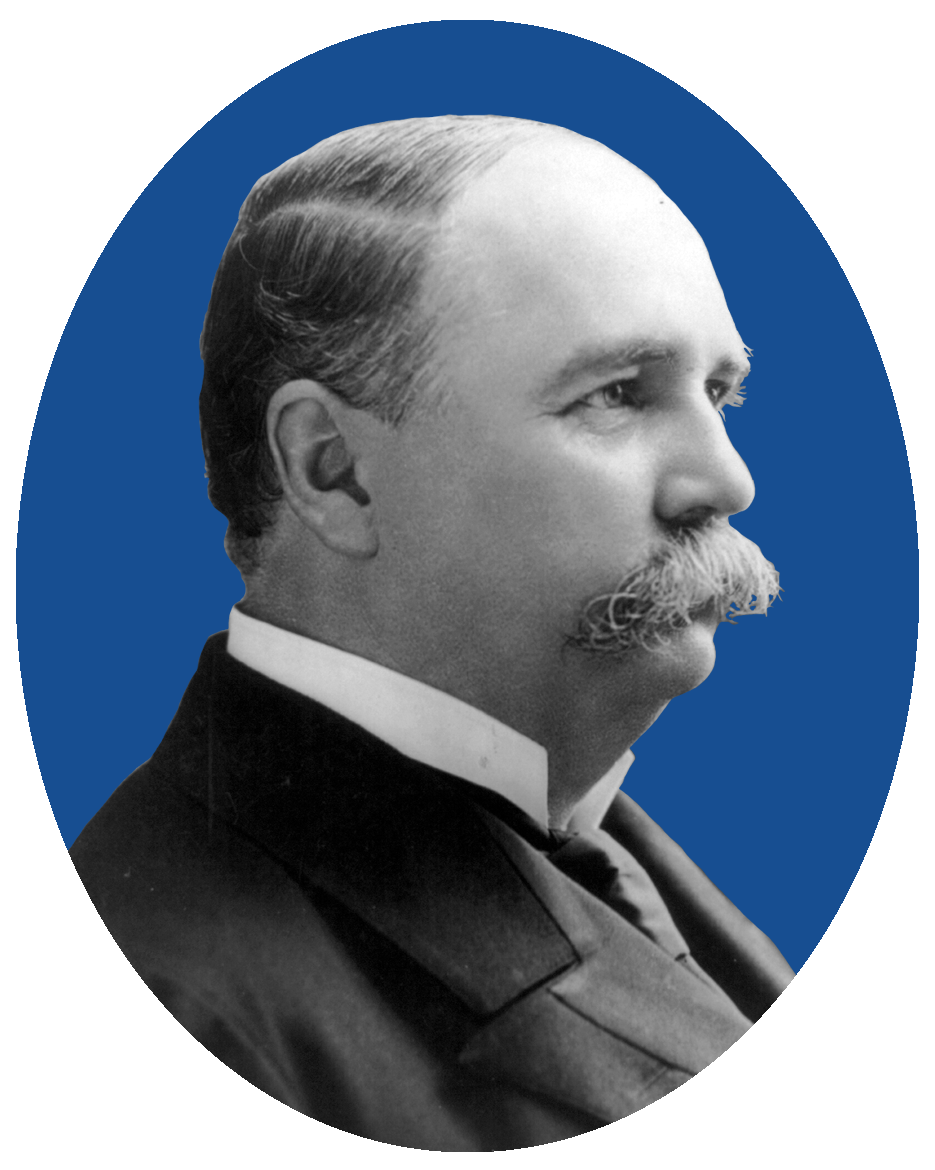
- Nominees; McKinley and Hobart

Convention
- Dates: June 16–18, 1896
- City: St. Louis, Missouri, U.S.
- Chair: John M. Thurston

Candidates
- Presidential nominee: William McKinley of Ohio
- Vice-presidential nominee: Garret A. Hobart of New Jersey

Voting
- Total delegates: 924
- Votes needed for nomination: 463
- Results (president): McKinley (Ohio): 661.5 (71.59%); Reed (Maine): 84.5 (9.15%); Quay (Pennsylvania): 61.5 (6.66%); Morton (New York): 58 (6.28%); Allison (Iowa): 35.5 (3.84%); Not Voting: 22 (2.38%); Cameron (Pennsylvania): 1 (0.11%)
- Ballots: 1

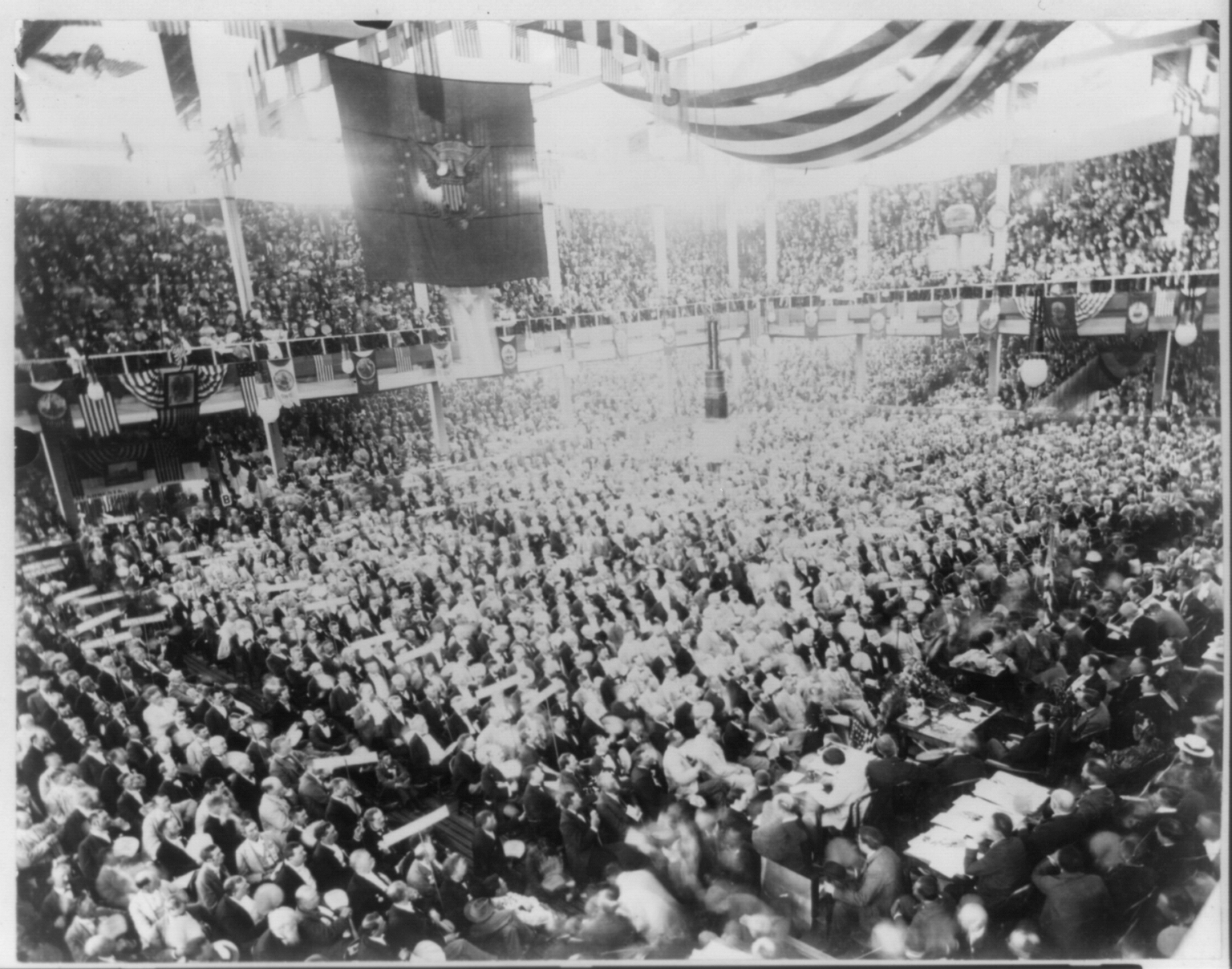
Inside of the convention hall

The 1896 Republican National Convention was held in a temporary structure south of the St. Louis City Hall in St. Louis, Missouri, United States, from June 16 to June 18, 1896.

Former Governor William McKinley of Ohio was nominated for president on the first ballot with 661½ votes to 84½ for House Speaker Thomas Brackett Reed of Maine, 61½ votes for Senator Matthew S. Quay of Pennsylvania, 58 votes for Governor Levi P. Morton of New York who was vice president (1889–1893) under President Benjamin Harrison. New Jersey banker Garret A. Hobart was nominated for vice president over Henry Clay Evans of Tennessee. Joseph B. Foraker of Ohio placed McKinley's name in nomination.

The convention was originally slated for the St. Louis Exposition and Music Hall. However it was determined that necessary repairs and upgrades to the Hall could not be done in time, and so a temporary wooden-construction convention hall was built in 60 days at a cost of $60,000 on the lawn south of the City Hall (which itself was under construction). At the conclusion of the convention, both the temporary building as well as the original Exposition Hall were torn down and a new Coliseum was built.

The 1896 convention was held in St. Louis less than a month after the infamous 1896 tornado that devastated a large swath of the city and killed at least 255 people. There was speculation that it might be unfeasible to hold the convention in the city, but, after a concerted cleanup effort was undertaken, the convention went ahead as planned.

== Platform ==
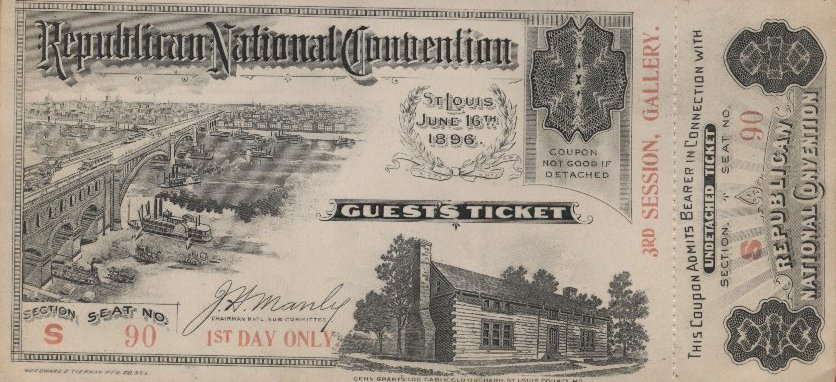
Entrance ticket, including a depiction of the city of St. Louis and the Eads Bridge among other illustrations

The Republican platform of 1896 favored the gold standard but left the door open to free coinage of silver, it also supported acquisition of Hawaii and parts of the Danish West Indies, favored a canal across Central America, naval expansion, sympathized with revolutionaries in Cuba and Armenia, wanted exclusion of all illiterate immigrants, applauded gains in women's rights and pledged "equal pay for equal work". It also supported creation of a "National Board of Arbitration".

== Presidential nomination ==
=== Presidential candidates ===
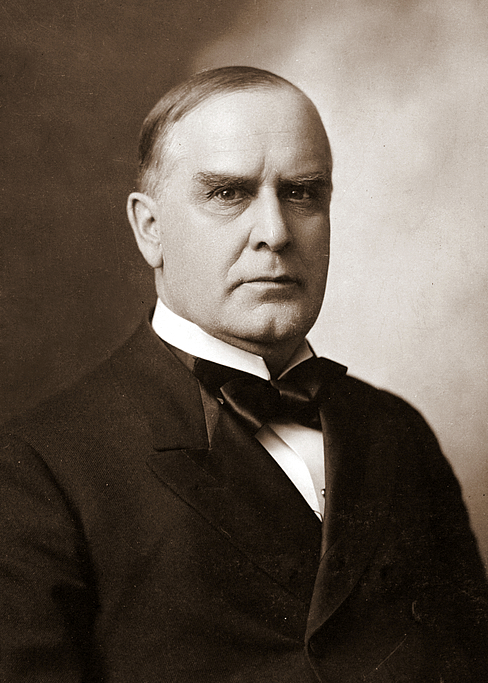
Former Governor
William McKinley
of Ohio

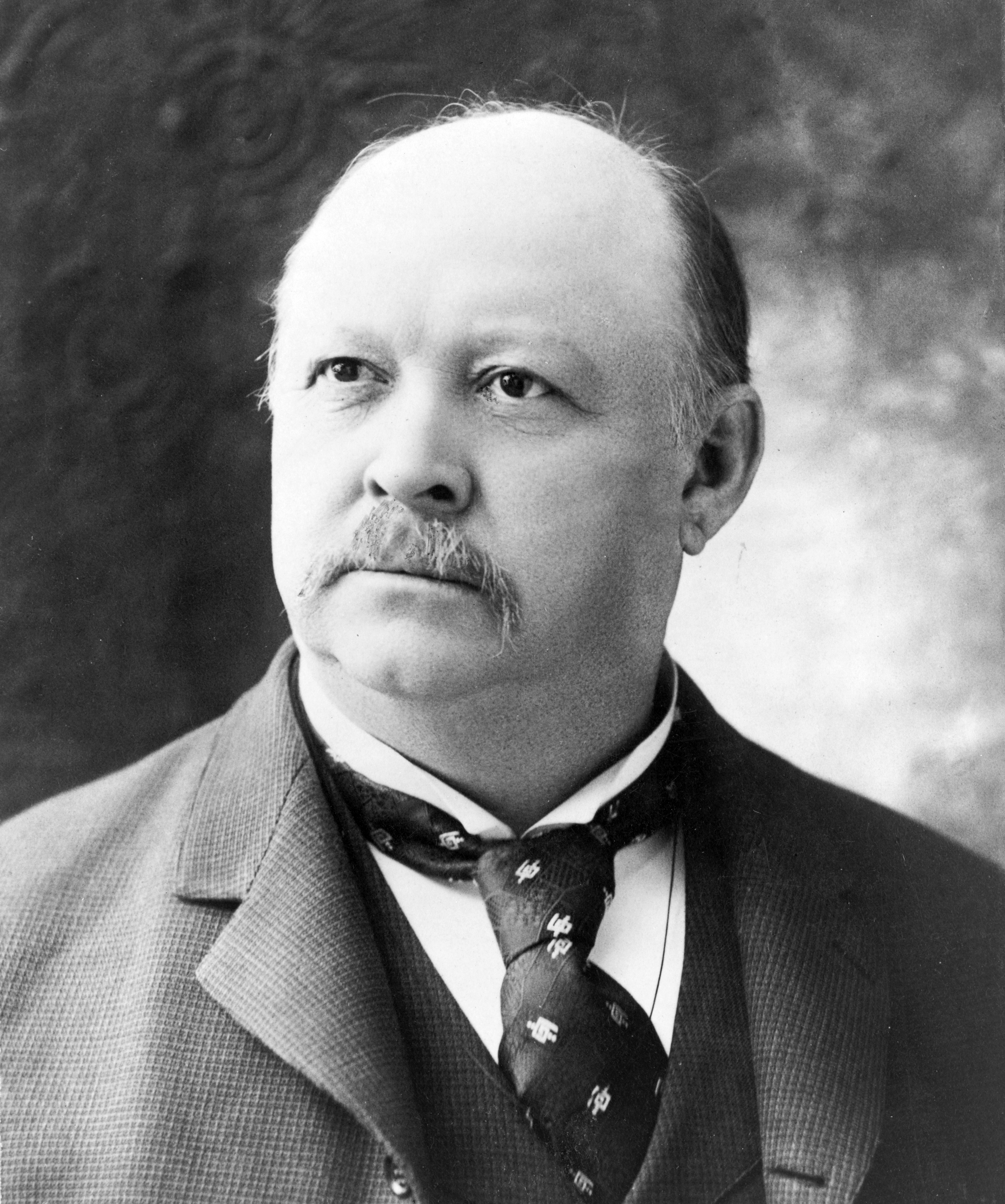
Speaker
Thomas B. Reed
of Maine

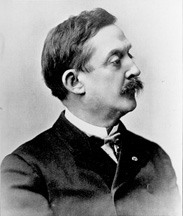
Senator
Matthew S. Quay
of Pennsylvania

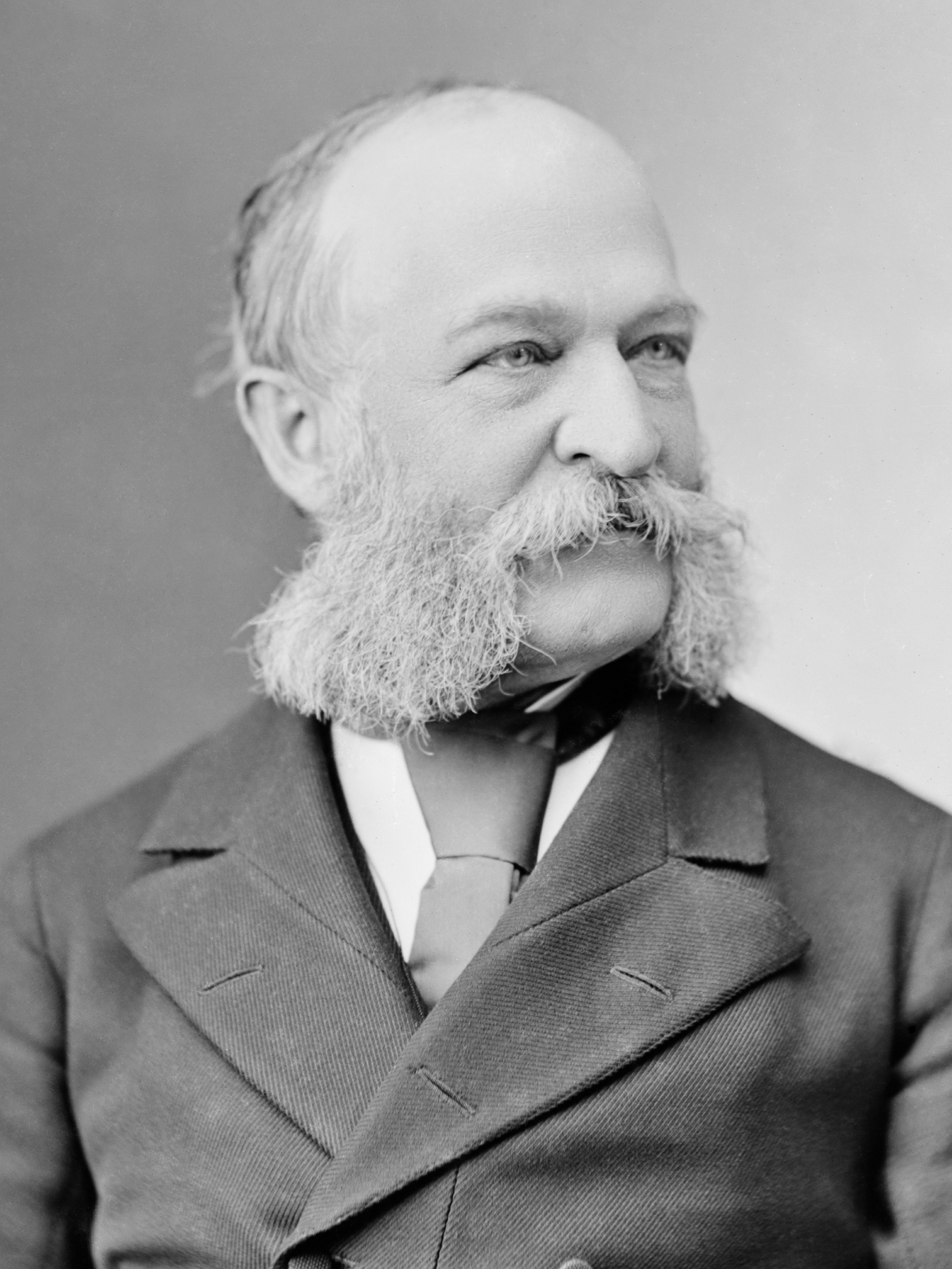
Governor and former Vice-President
Levi P. Morton
of New York

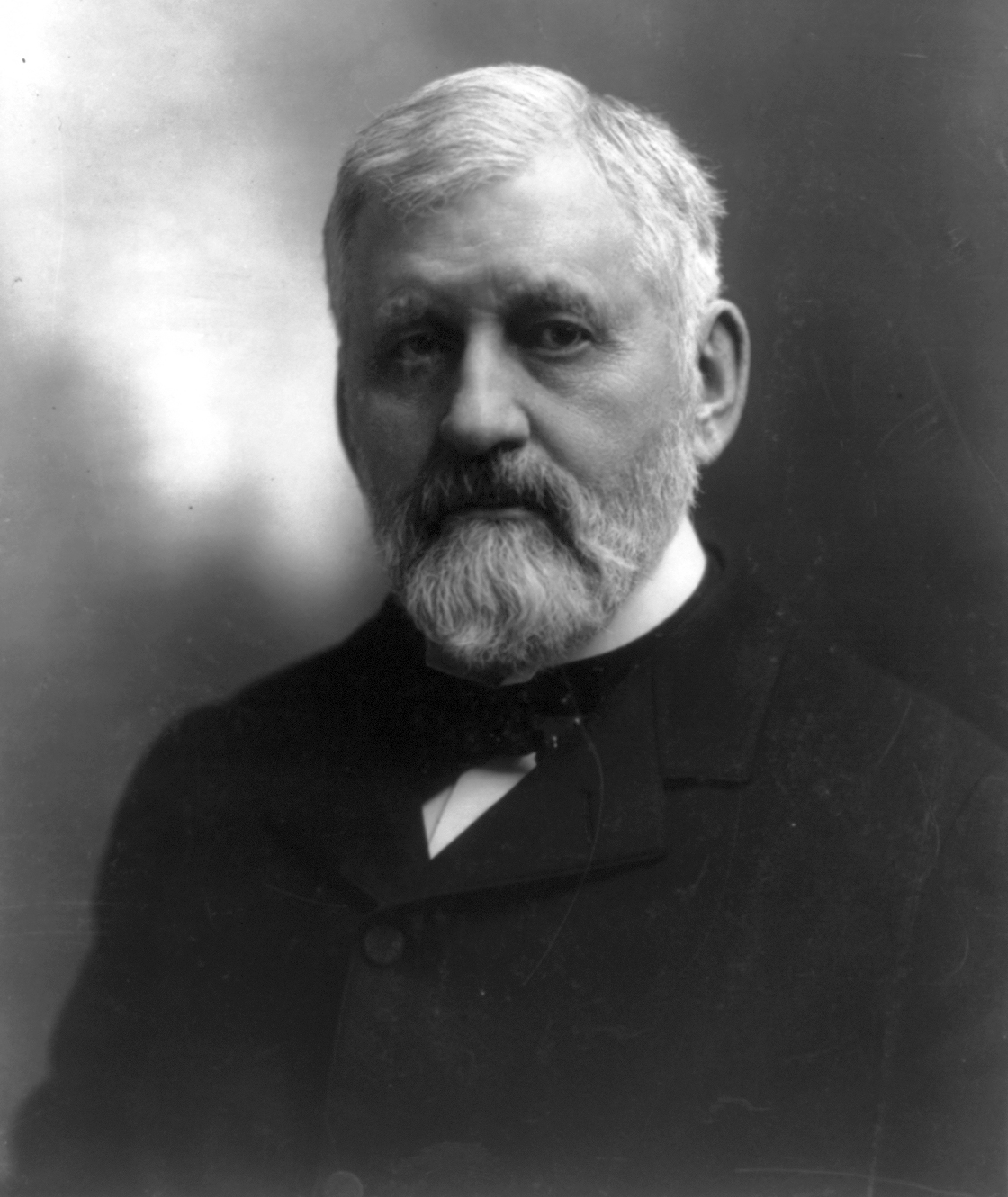
Senator
William B. Allison
of Iowa

Presidential Ballot
Candidate	1st
McKinley	661.5
Reed	84.5
Quay	61.5
Morton	58
Allison	35.5
Cameron	1
Not Represented	14
Not Voting	8

Presidential Balloting / 3rd Day of Convention (June 18, 1896)

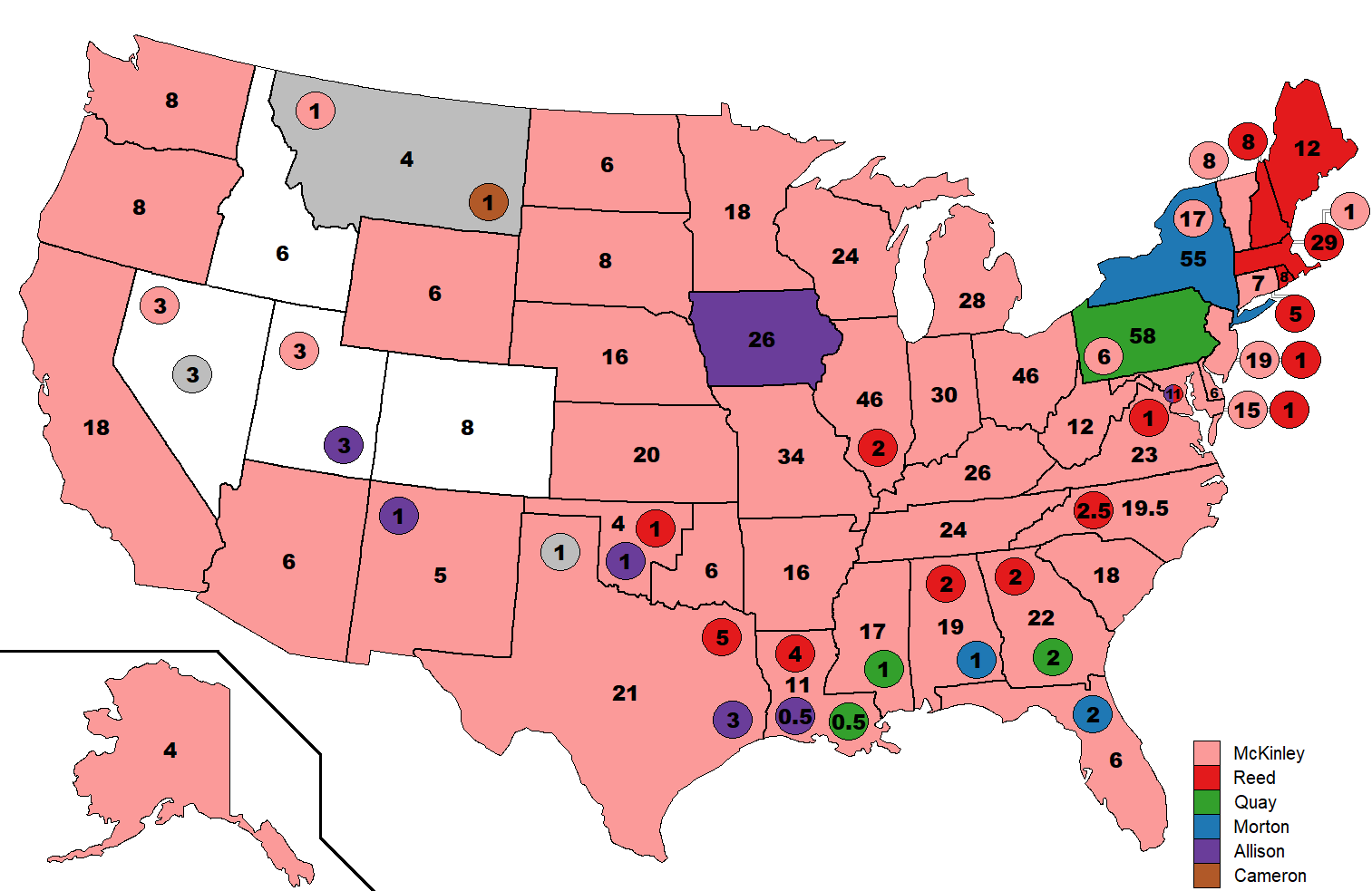
1st Presidential Ballot

== Vice Presidential nomination ==
=== Vice Presidential candidates ===
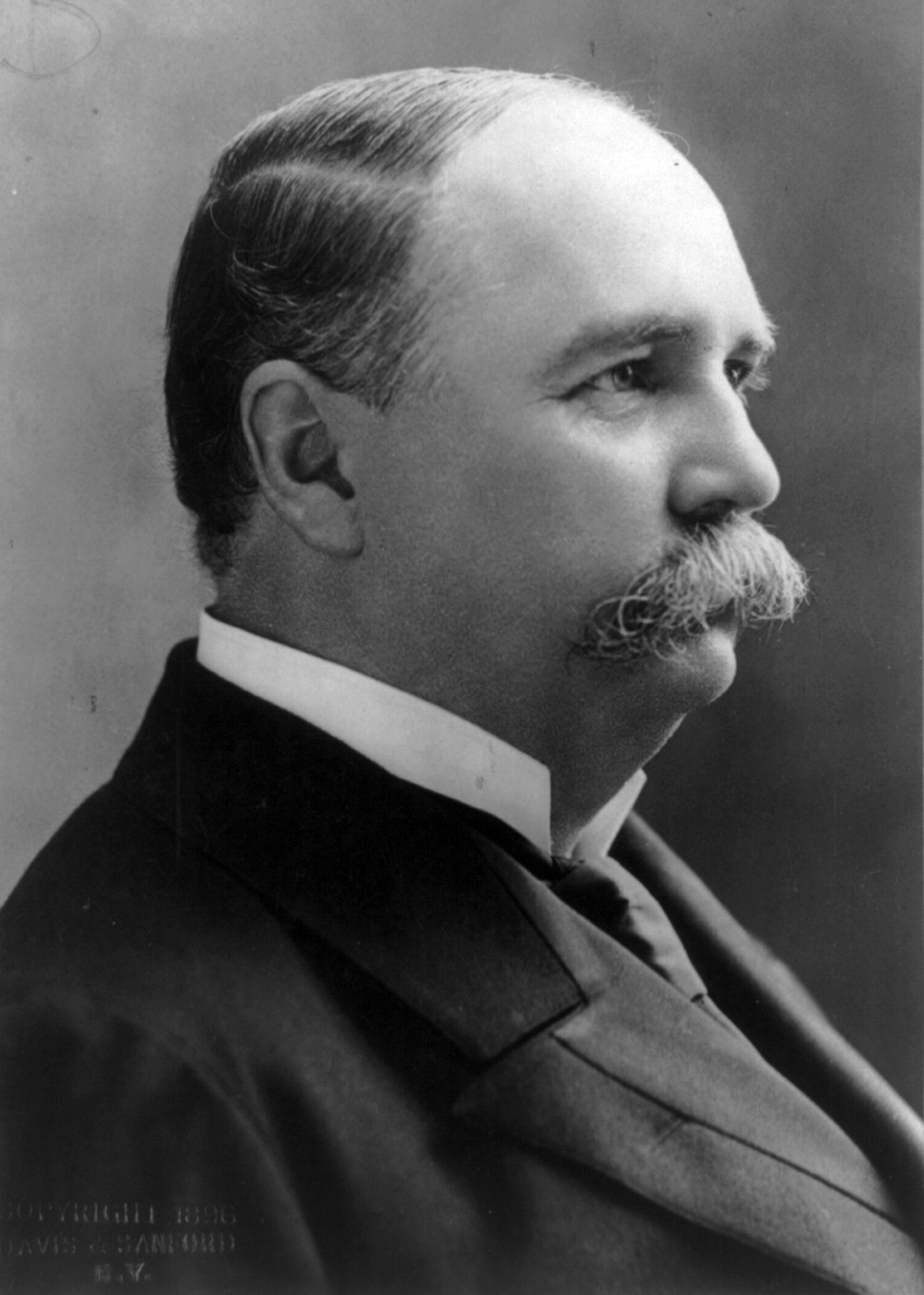
Former State Senator
Garret A. Hobart
of New Jersey

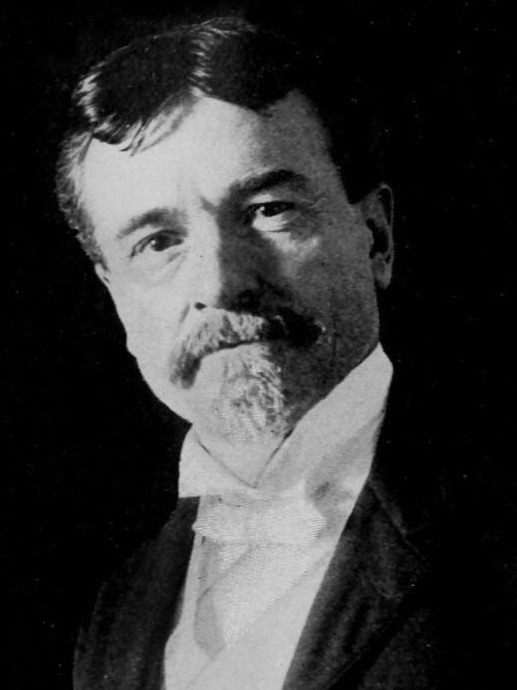
Former Representative
Henry Clay Evans
of Tennessee

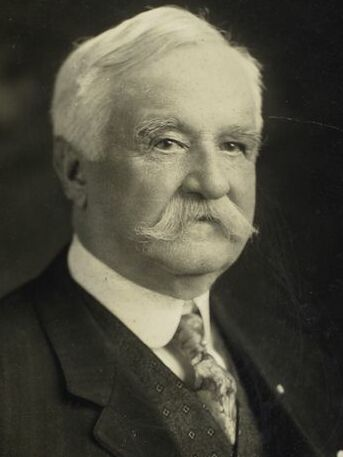
Former Governor
Morgan G. Bulkeley
of Connecticut

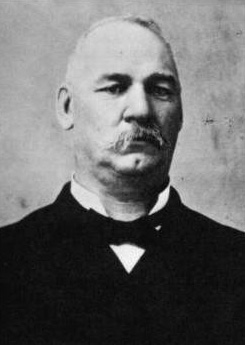
Representative
James A. Walker
of Virginia

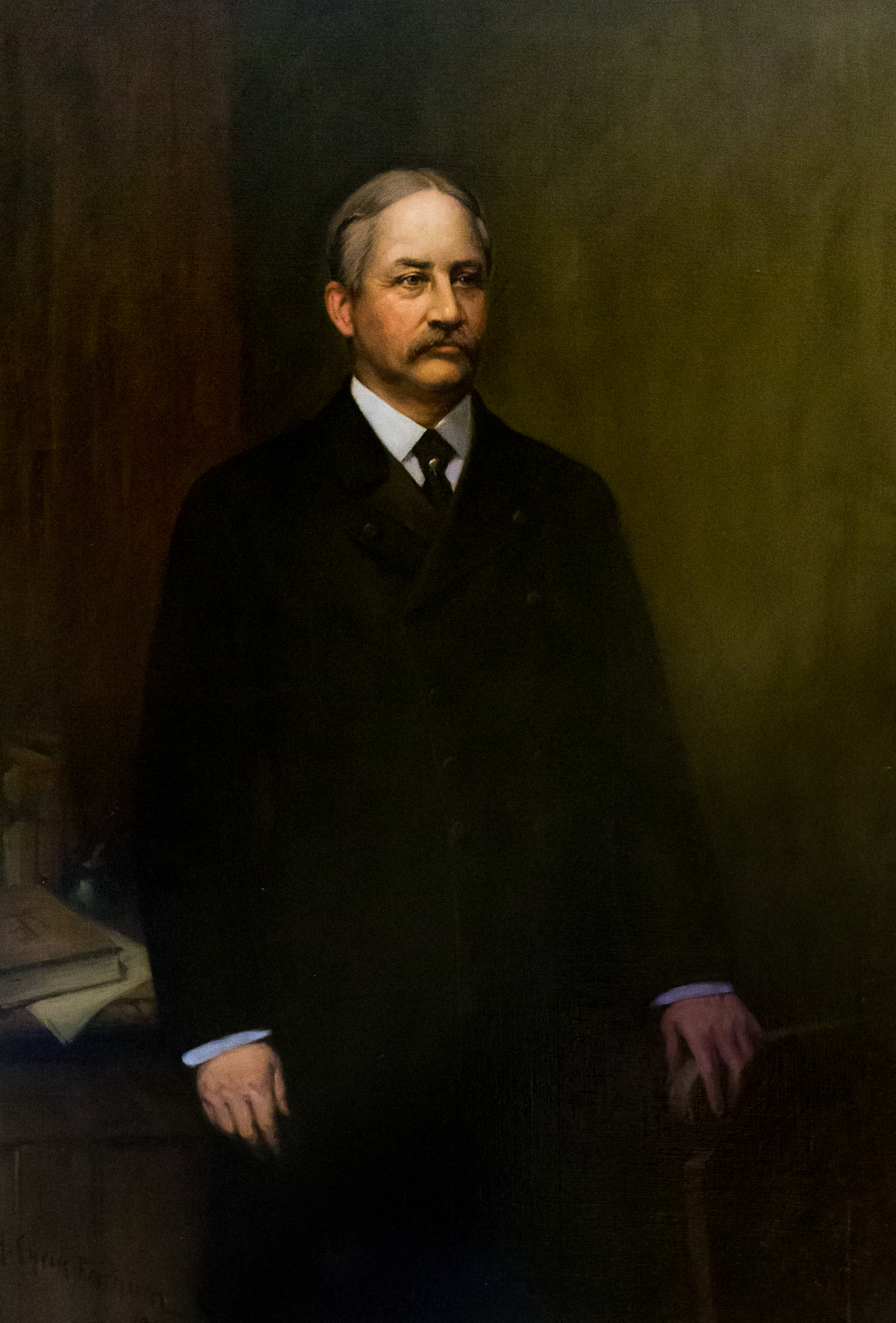
Governor
Charles W. Lippitt
of Rhode Island

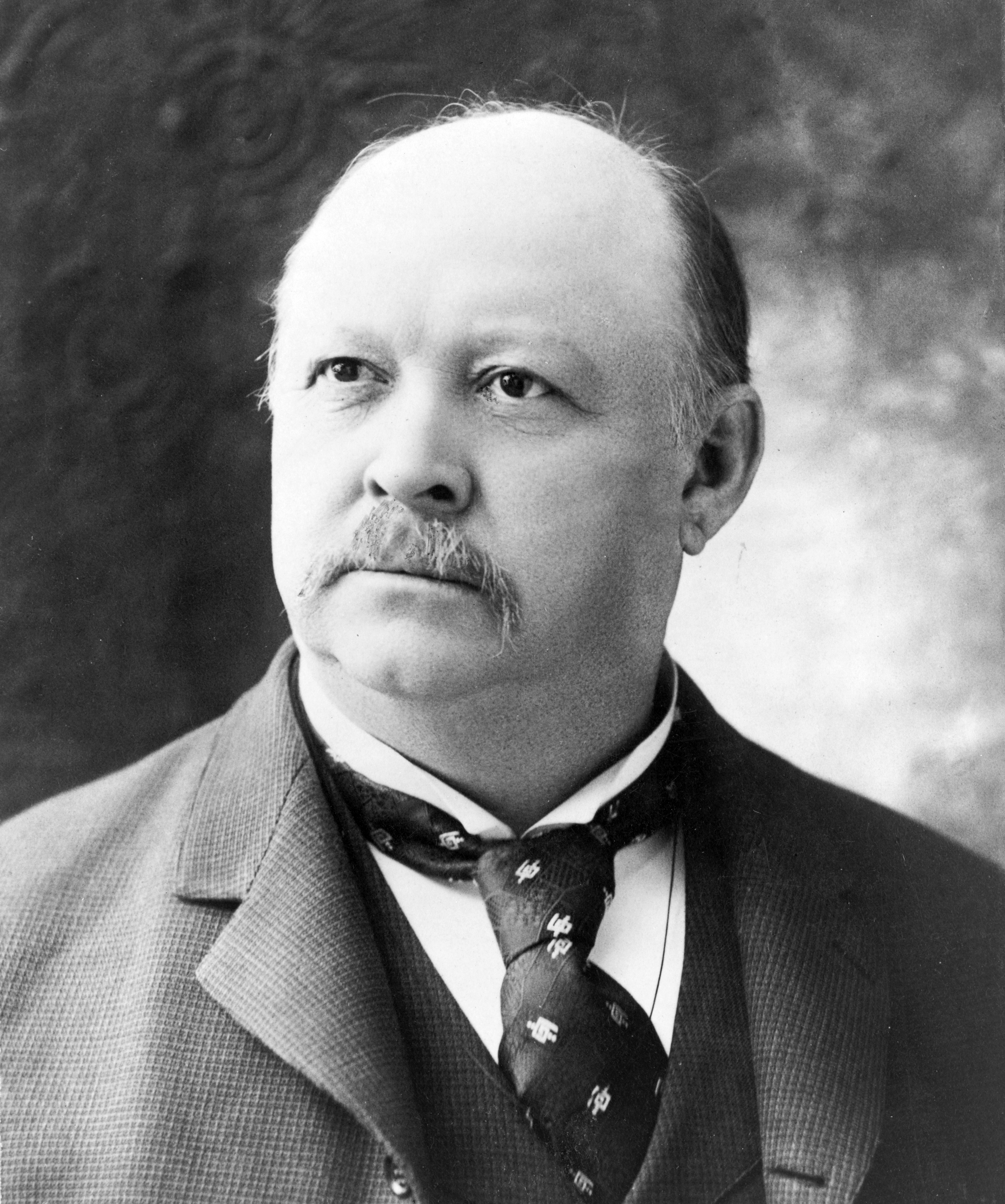
Speaker
Thomas B. Reed
of Maine
(Declined Consideration)

For a running mate, McKinley had preferred Speaker Thomas B. Reed, with whom he had worked for many years in the House, but Reed would accept only the top spot on the ticket.

Coming into the convention, former Vice President Levi P. Morton had strong support to re-take his former office from delegates who favored the gold standard. However, McKinley's manager, Mark Hanna opposed Morton's addition to the ticket, instead favoring Garret A. Hobart or Minnesota Senator Cushman Kellogg Davis. Though McKinley's camp did not strongly oppose the party's gold standard platform, Hanna feared that the nomination of Morton would cause silver Republicans such as Colorado Senator Henry M. Teller to bolt the party. He also feared that the nomination of Morton would be considered a concession to Thomas Platt and the party bosses. Hanna was ultimately successful at keeping Morton off the ticket, but many silver Republicans nonetheless supported the Democratic ticket of William Jennings Bryan and Arthur Sewall.

Vice Presidential Ballot
Candidate	1st
Hobart	533.5
Evans	277.5
Bulkeley	39
Walker	24
Lippitt	8
Depew	3
Reed	3
Brown	2
Grant	2
Thurston	2
Morton	1
Not Voting	15
Not Represented	14

Vice Presidential Balloting / 3rd Day of Convention (June 18, 1896)

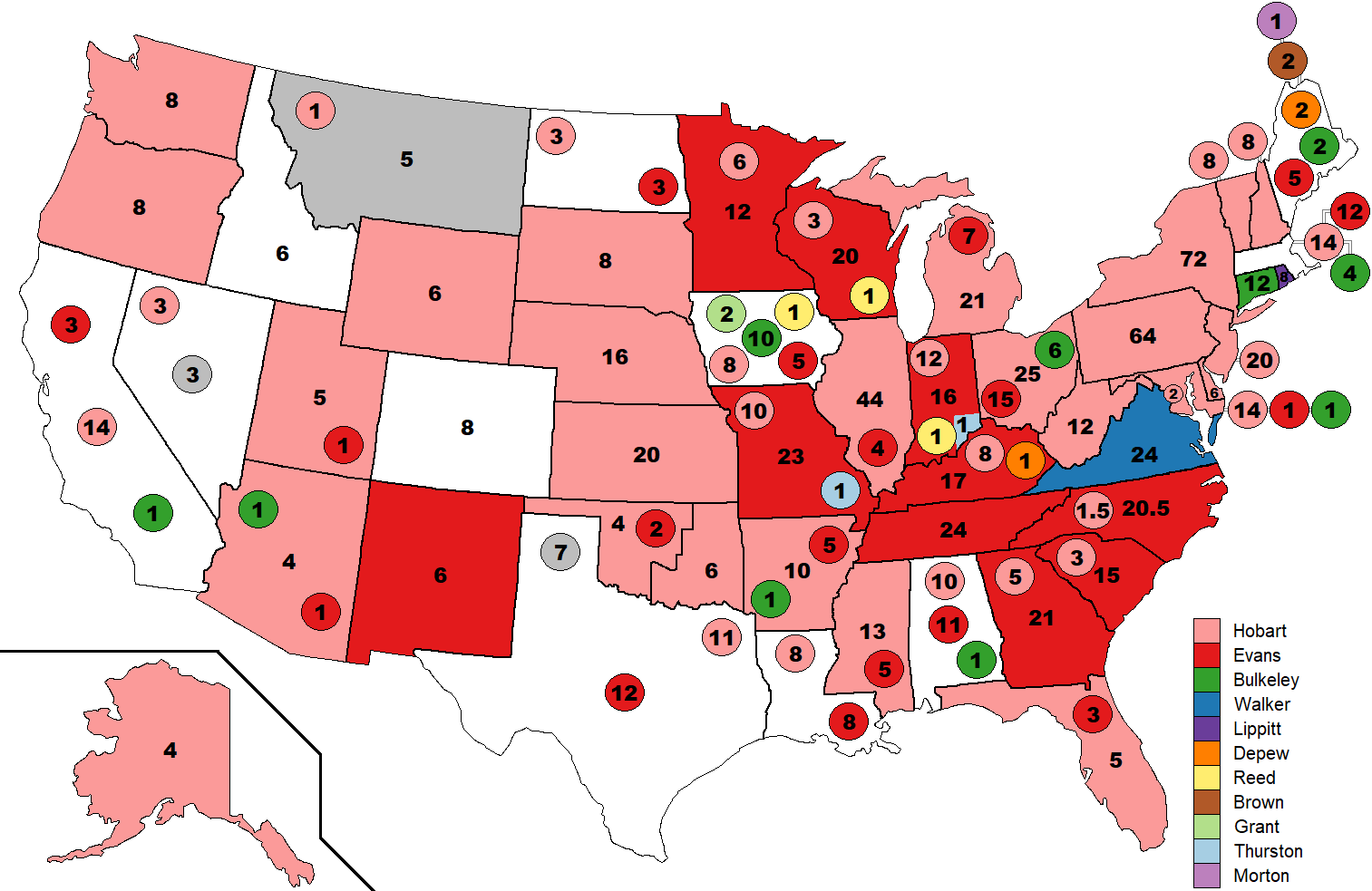
1st
Vice Presidential Ballot

== See also ==
- History of the United States Republican Party
- List of Republican National Conventions
- United States presidential nominating convention
- 1896 United States presidential election
- 1896 Democratic National Convention
- McKinley at Home, Canton, Ohio
- William McKinley 1896 presidential campaign

Preceded by 1892; Minneapolis, Minnesota	Republican National Conventions	Succeeded by 1900; Philadelphia, Pennsylvania
