= 1894 Tennessee gubernatorial election =

- November 6, 1894
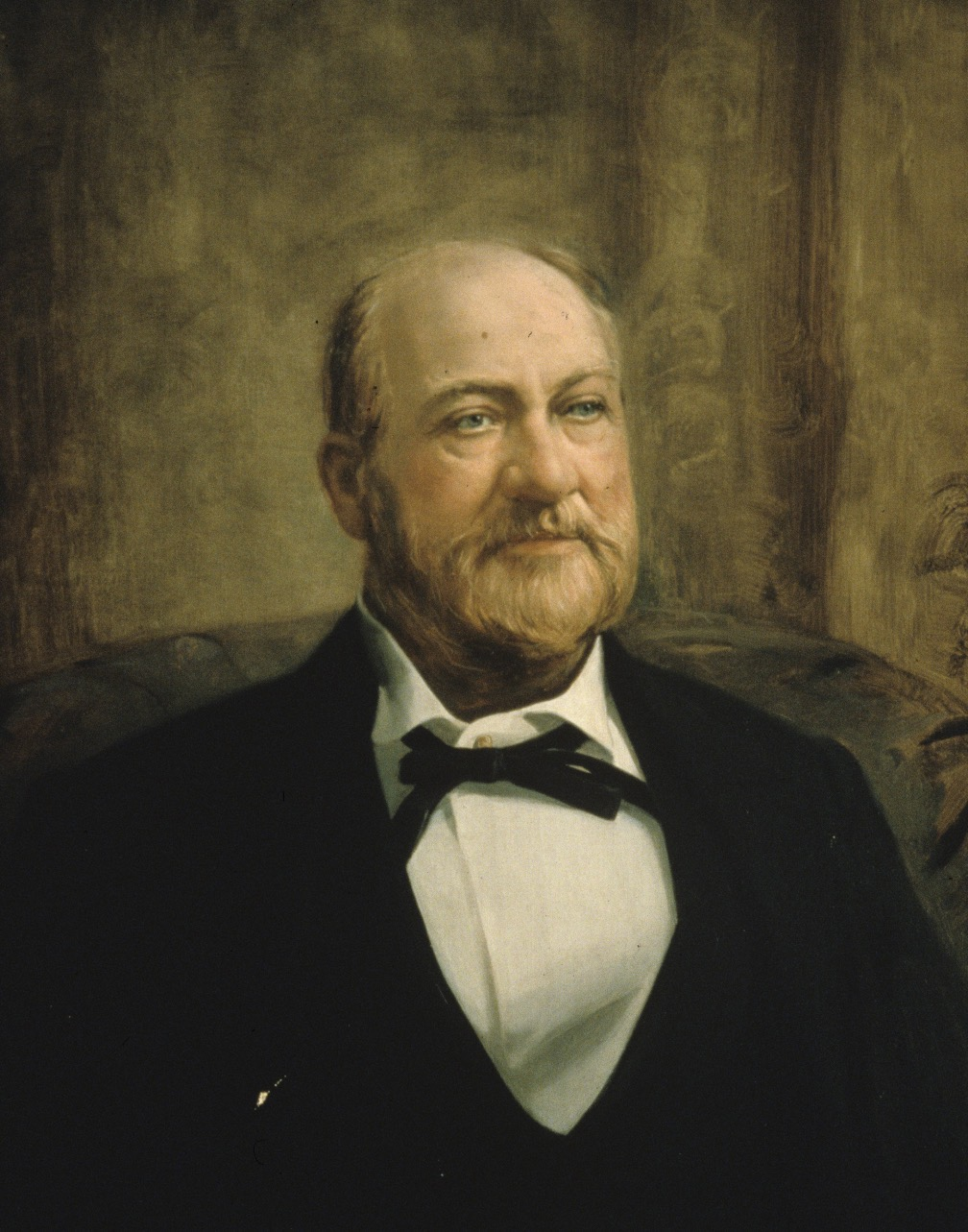

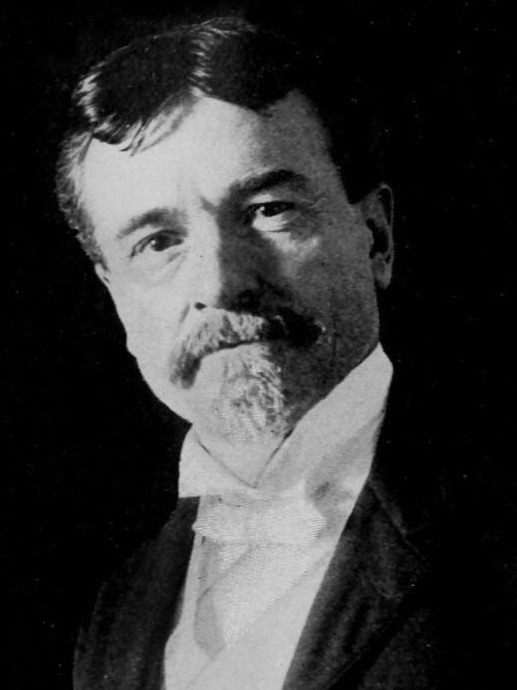

| Nominee | Peter Turney | Henry Clay Evans | A. L. Mims |
| Party | Democratic | Republican | Populist |
| Popular vote | 94,620 | 92,266 | 23,092 |
| Percentage | 45.06% | 43.94% | 11.00% |
- County results Turney: 40–50% 50–60% 60–70% 70–80% 80–90% Evans: 40–50% 50–60% 60–70% 70–80% 80–90% >90%
Governor before election
Peter Turney
Democratic
Elected Governor
Peter Turney
Democratic

The 1894 Tennessee gubernatorial election was held on November 6, 1894. Incumbent Democratic governor Peter Turney defeated former congressman and Republican nominee Henry Clay Evans with 45.06% of the vote.

Henry Clay Evans had been gerrymandered out of office for supporting the Lodge Bill. Though Turney painted Evans as a "carpetbagger," Evans ran an effective campaign, and the initial vote tally on election day indicated Evans had won with 105,104 votes to 104,356 for Turney, and 23,088 for Populist candidate A.J. Mims. The Democratic-controlled legislature, however, declared voter fraud had occurred and negated over 23,000 votes, allowing Turney to win the election by 2,000 votes.

== General election ==
=== Candidates ===
- H. Clay Evans, former U.S. representative and mayor of Chattanooga (Republican)
- A. L. Mims (People's)
- Peter Turney, Chief Justice of the Tennessee Supreme Court (Democratic)

=== Results ===
1894 Tennessee gubernatorial election
| Party | Candidate | Votes | % | ±% |
|---|---|---|---|---|
| Democratic | Peter Turney (incumbent) | 94,620 | 45.06% | |
| Republican | Henry Clay Evans | 92,266 | 43.94% | |
| Populist | A. L. Mims | 23,092 | 11.00% | |
| Majority | | 2,354 | | |
| Turnout | | | | |
| Democratic hold | | Swing | | |
