= H. Clay Evans =

American politician (1843–1921)

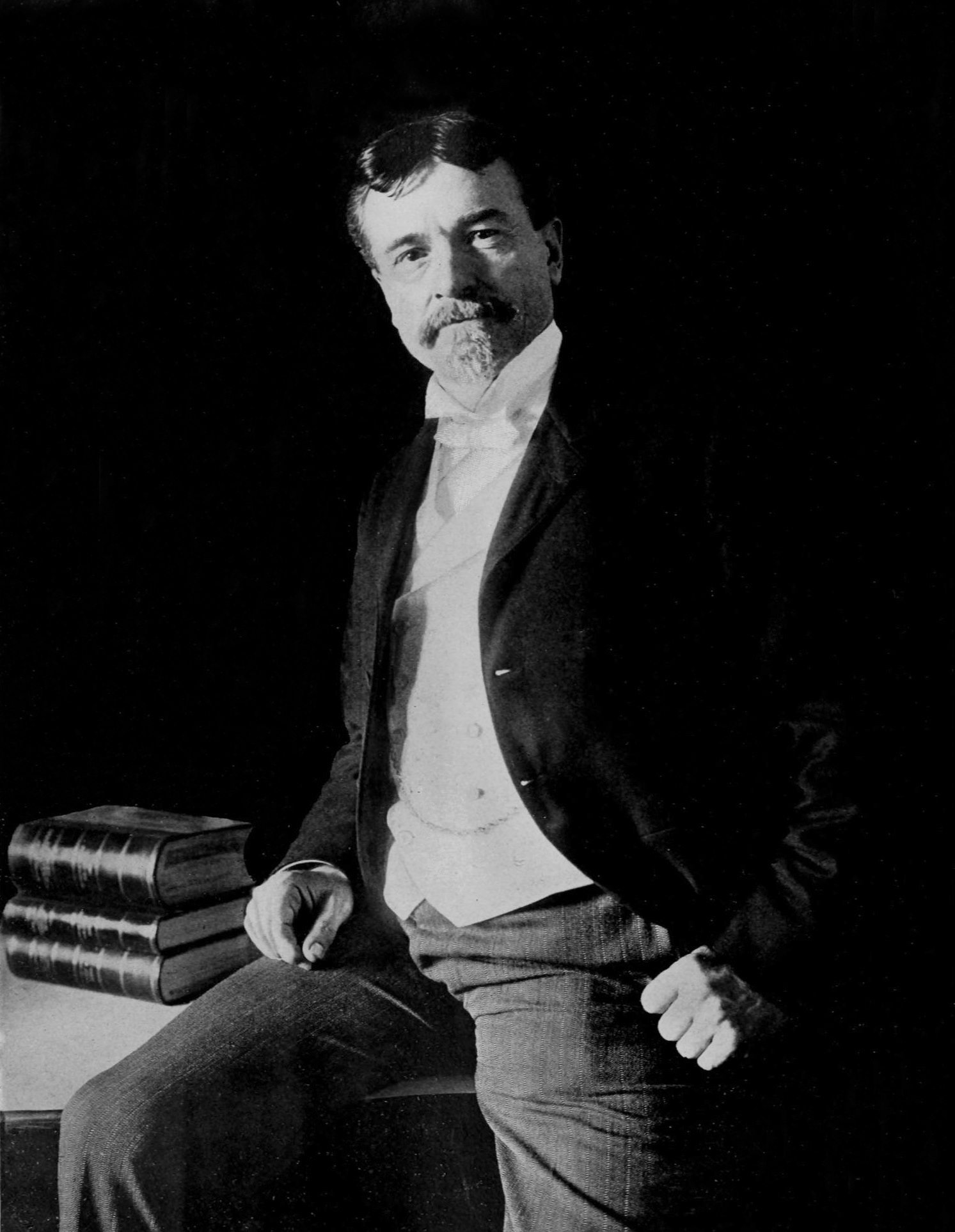
- Evans in 1901

Member of the U.S. House of Representatives from Tennessee's 3rd district
- In office March 4, 1889 – March 3, 1891
- Preceded by: John R. Neal
- Succeeded by: Henry C. Snodgrass

Mayor of Chattanooga, Tennessee
- In office 1882–1883
- Preceded by: John A. Hart
- Succeeded by: Hugh Whiteside

Personal details
- Born: June 18, 1843 Juniata County, Pennsylvania, US
- Died: December 12, 1921 (aged 78) Chattanooga, Tennessee, US
- Resting place: Forest Hills Cemetery; Chattanooga, Tennessee
- Party: Republican
- Children: 3
- Profession: Businessman

Military service
- Allegiance: United States of America
- Branch/service: (United States) Union Army
- Years of service: May 6, 1864 to September 24, 1864
- Rank: Quartermaster Sergeant
- Unit: Company A, 41st Regiment, Wisconsin Volunteer Infantry
- Battles/wars: American Civil War

Henry Clay Evans (June 18, 1843 – December 12, 1921) was an American politician and businessman who represented Tennessee's 3rd district in the United States House of Representatives from 1889 to 1891, and was twice a candidate for Governor of Tennessee (1894 and 1906). He also served as Commissioner of Pensions from 1897 to 1902, and as U.S. consul to London from 1902 to 1905.

A supporter of progressive causes such as the Lodge Bill, Evans frequently found himself at odds with the Southern Democrat-controlled state legislature. His district was gerrymandered to ensure his defeat in the 1890 congressional elections, and the state legislature discarded thousands of votes in the 1894 gubernatorial election to allow his opponent, Peter Turney, to win. He also consistently quarreled with fellow Tennessee Republicans, initially Congressman Leonidas C. Houk, and later the faction led by Congressman Walter P. Brownlow. Brownlow helped thwart Evans's bid for the vice presidential nomination at the 1896 Republican National Convention.

Evans was also active in local politics in his adopted hometown of Chattanooga, where he championed education. He served two terms as Mayor of Chattanooga (1882–1883), and in his later years served as the city's Commissioner of Education.

== Biography ==
Born on June 18, 1843, in Juniata County, Pennsylvania, Evans moved to Wisconsin in 1844, with his parents, Jesse and Anna Single Evans, who settled in Platteville, Grant County. He attended the common schools, a business school in Madison, and graduated from a business school at Chicago in 1861.

== Career ==
During the Civil War, Evans enlisted on May 6, 1864, as a corporal in Company A, 41st Regiment, Wisconsin Volunteer Infantry and served until he was discharged as a quartermaster sergeant on September 24, 1864. For a year, he was an agent with the quartermaster department in Chattanooga, Tennessee. He then spent some time in Texas and New York. He married Adelaide Durand in Westfield, New York, in 1869 and they had three children.

In 1870, Evans returned to Chattanooga and engaged in the manufacture of freight cars. Elected mayor in 1881, he served two terms. He organized the public-school system of Chattanooga and served as first school commissioner. From 1884 to 1885 he worked as cashier of Chattanooga's First National Bank. Evans became president of the Chattanooga Car and Foundry Company and remained principal owner until 1917.

Elected as a Republican to the Fifty-first Congress, Evans served from March 4, 1889, to March 3, 1891. He was not a successful candidate for reelection in 1890 to the Fifty-second Congress and was First Assistant Postmaster General from 1891 to 1893.

Evans was elected Governor of Tennessee in 1894 on the face of the returns, but a recount rejected certain votes and declared his Democratic opponent, Peter Turney, elected. He was appointed Commissioner of Pensions April 1, 1897, and served until May 13, 1902, when he resigned to enter the diplomatic service.

Appointed United States consul general to London, England, on May 9, 1902, Evans resigned from that position in 1905. He was chosen commissioner of health and education of Chattanooga in 1911.

== Death ==
Evans died from heart disease in Chattanooga, Tennessee, on December 12, 1921, aged 78. He is interred at Forest Hills Cemetery, St. Elmo, Chattanooga, Tennessee.

Party political offices
Preceded by George W. Winstead	Republican nominee for Governor of Tennessee; 1894	Succeeded by G. N. Tillman
Preceded by Jessie M. Littleton	Republican nominee for Governor of Tennessee; 1906	Succeeded by G. N. Tillman
First	Republican nominee for United States Senator from Tennessee (Class 2); 1918	Succeeded by Hugh B. Lindsay
U.S. House of Representatives
Preceded by John R. Neal	Member of the U.S. House of Representatives from Tennessee's 3rd congressional district 1889–1891	Succeeded by Henry C. Snodgrass
