= 1892 Tennessee gubernatorial election =

- November 8, 1892
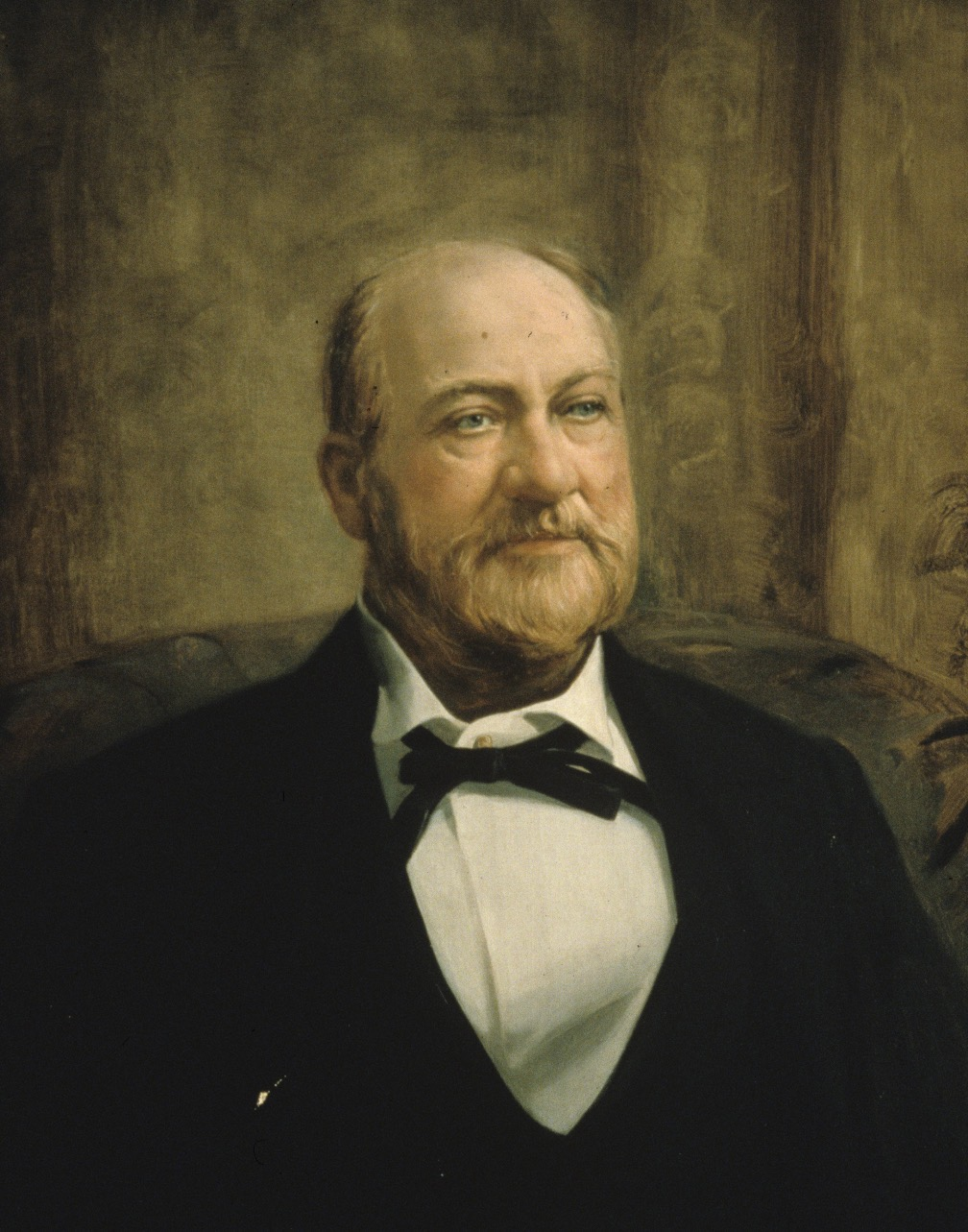

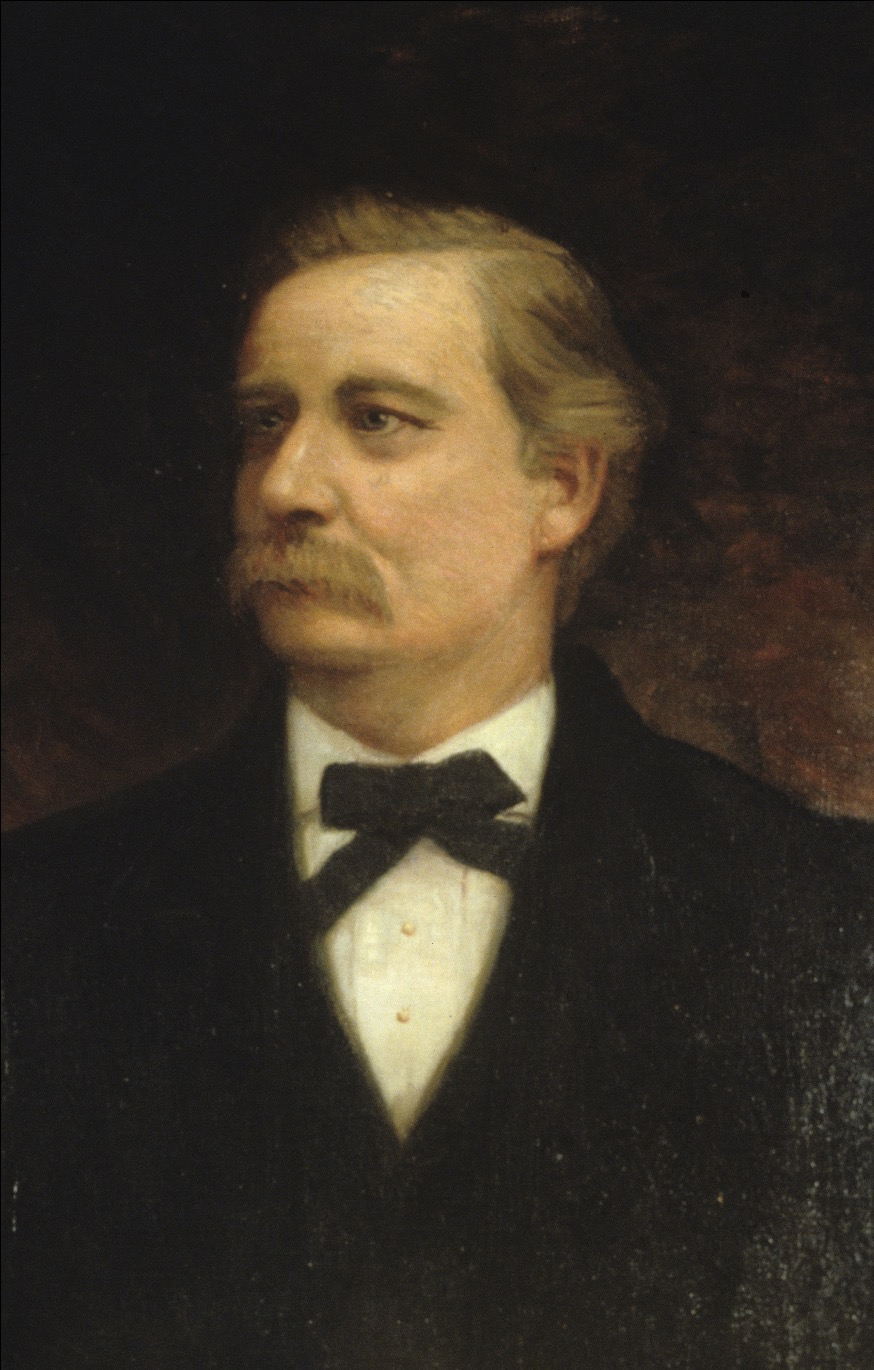
Nominee	Peter Turney	George W. Winstead	John P. Buchanan
Party	Democratic	Republican	Populist
Popular vote	126,248	100,599	31,515
Percentage	47.86%	38.14%	11.95%
- County results Turney: 40–50% 50–60% 60–70% 70–80% 80–90% Winstead: 40–50% 50–60% 60–70% 70–80% 80–90%
Governor before election
John P. Buchanan
Democratic
Elected Governor
Peter Turney
Democratic

The 1892 Tennessee gubernatorial election was held on November 8, 1892. Democratic nominee Peter Turney defeated Republican nominee George W. Winstead, and Incumbent Governor John P. Buchanan, who ran as a Populist, with 47.86% of the vote.

During the primaries, Governor Buchanan, lacking the support among Democrats, withdrew from the Democratic primary to run as a populist for re-election. Democrats nominated Tennessee Chief Justice, Turney as their party's candidate, and Republicans nominated George W. Winstead.

== General election ==
=== Candidates ===
Major party candidates

- Peter Turney, Democratic
- George W. Winstead, Republican

Other candidates

- John P. Buchanan, People's
- Edward H. East, Prohibition

=== Results ===
1892 Tennessee gubernatorial election
Party	Candidate	Votes	%	±%
Democratic	Peter Turney	126,248	47.86%	
Republican	George W. Winstead	100,599	38.14%	
Populist	John P. Buchanan (incumbent)	31,515	11.95%	
Prohibition	Edward H. East	5,427	2.06%	
Majority		25,649		
Turnout				
Democratic hold		Swing		
