= Peter Turney =

American judge

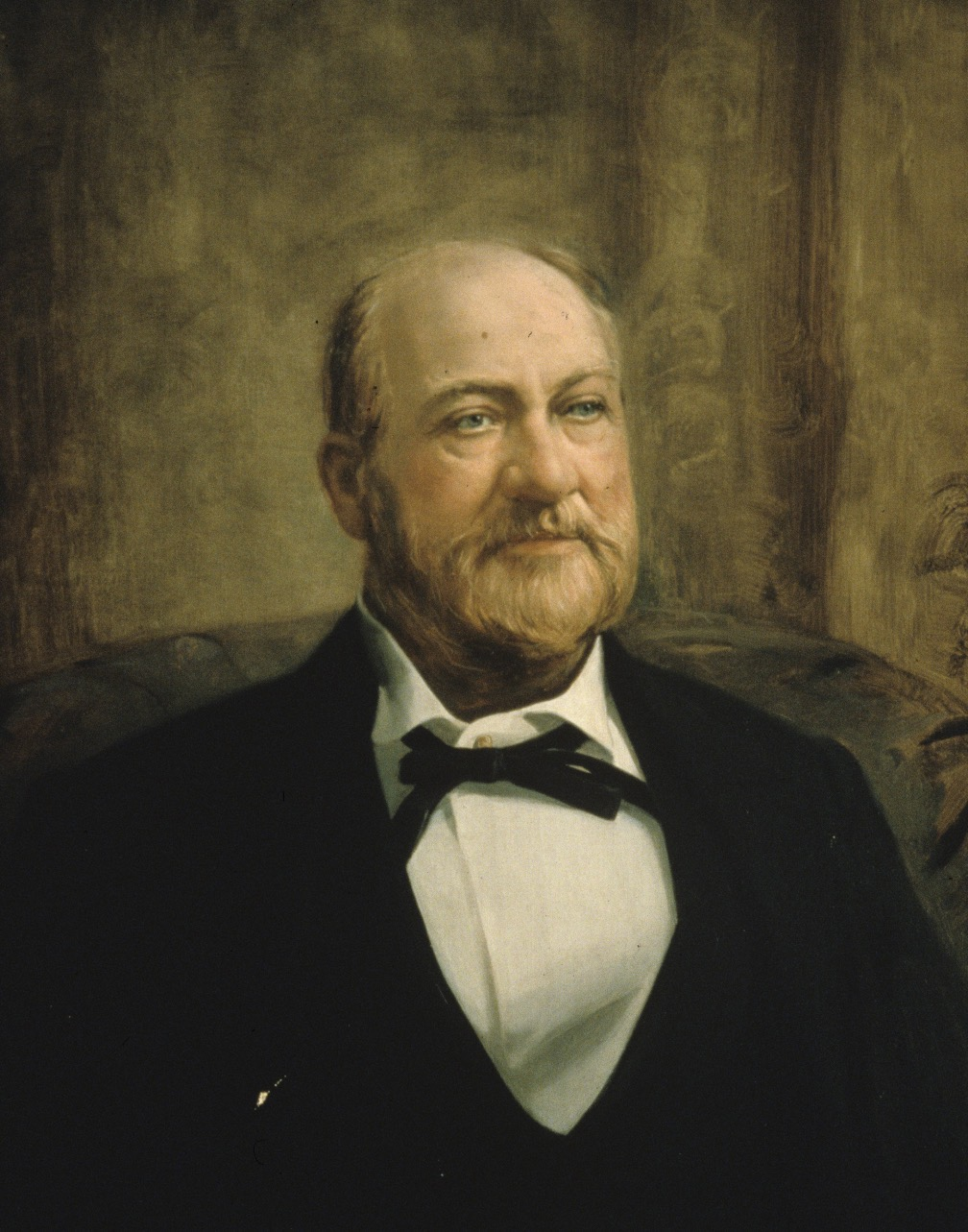
- Posthumous portrait by Lloyd Branson, c. 1907

26th Governor of Tennessee
- In office January 16, 1893 – January 21, 1897
- Preceded by: John P. Buchanan
- Succeeded by: Robert Love Taylor

Chief Justice of the Tennessee Supreme Court
- In office 1886–1893
- Preceded by: James W. Deaderick
- Succeeded by: Horace H. Lurton

Personal details
- Born: September 22, 1827 Jasper, Tennessee
- Died: October 19, 1903 (aged 76) Winchester, Tennessee
- Resting place: Winchester City Cemetery
- Party: Democratic
- Spouse(s): Cassandra Garner (1851–1857, her death); Hannah Graham (m. 1858)
- Relations: Hopkins L. Turney (father)
- Profession: Attorney

Military service
- Allegiance: Confederate States of America
- Branch/service: Confederate States Army
- Years of service: 1861–1865
- Rank: Colonel
- Commands: 1st Tennessee Infantry (Provisional)
- Battles/wars: American Civil War • Bull Run (1861) • Shenandoah Campaign (1862) • Seven Days (1862) • Peninsula Campaign (1862) • Fredericksburg (1862)

Peter Turney (September 22, 1827 – October 19, 1903) was an American politician, soldier, and jurist, who served as the 26th governor of Tennessee from 1893 to 1897. He was also a justice of the Tennessee Supreme Court from 1870 to 1893, and served as the court's Chief Justice from 1886 to 1893. During the Civil War, Turney was colonel of the First Tennessee Regiment, one of the first Tennessee units to join the Confederate Army.

As governor, Turney ended the state's controversial convict lease system and enacted other prison reform measures. His second term was marred by the 1894 gubernatorial election, which he won only after the state's Democratic-controlled legislature threw out thousands of votes for his opponent, Henry Clay Evans.

== Early life ==
Turney was born at Jasper, Tennessee, the son of Hopkins L. Turney and Teresa Francis. His father was a prominent politician who was elected to the United States Senate in 1845 with the help of the Andrew Johnson-led "Immortal Thirteen." Shortly after Peter's birth, the Turneys moved to Winchester, Tennessee. He attended public schools in Franklin County and a private school in Nashville, and read law, initially with his father, and later (after his father was elected to the Senate) with Judge W.E. Venable. After his admission to the bar in 1848, he practiced in Winchester.

A strong Southern Democrat, Turney campaigned for John C. Breckinridge in the presidential race of 1860, and called for immediate secession after Abraham Lincoln's victory. In February 1861, he was the pro-secession candidate from his district for a proposed state convention at which Tennessee would have considered the secession issue (his pro-Union opponent was future governor Albert S. Marks). When Tennessee voters rejected this convention and upheld the state's ties to the Union, Turney spearheaded a movement that called for Franklin County to secede from Tennessee and join Alabama.

In the two weeks following the Battle of Fort Sumter in April 1861, as sentiments in Tennessee shifted in favor of secession, Turney raised a regiment of troops, the First Tennessee Infantry (sometimes called "Turney's First" to distinguish it from a similarly-designated regiment). As Tennessee had yet to officially secede, Turney acted mostly in secret until early May, when the state aligned itself militarily with the Confederacy.

Turney's unit arrived in Virginia on May 8, and was eventually attached to the Army of Northern Virginia. The unit took part in the First Battle of Bull Run in July 1861, and spent the subsequent months patrolling the Potomac River region. In 1862, the unit took part in the Shenandoah Campaign, the Seven Days Battles, and the Peninsula Campaign. At the Battle of Fredericksburg in December 1862, Turney was shot in the mouth, and never returned to active fighting. While he was away recovering, his unit fought in the Battle of Gettysburg, marching with the left flank of Pickett's Charge. Turney was given an administrative command in Florida in 1864, and remained there until the end of the war.

== Tennessee Supreme Court ==
Following Tennessee's implementation of its 1870 constitution, Turney was elected to the Tennessee Supreme Court. He was reelected in 1878 and 1886, and was elevated to Chief Justice following the latter race. Although he spent 23 years on the court, Turney issued few opinions, and those he did write have been described by legal scholars as short and confusing.

In October 1891, the Turney-led court ruled on two cases related to a labor-related uprising in Anderson County, Tennessee, known as the Coal Creek War. The Tennessee Coal Mining Company (TCMC) had attempted to replace striking miners with convicts leased from the state, and the miners had responded by overwhelming company stockades and removing the convicts. Governor John P. Buchanan had sent the state guard into the area, and had negotiated an uneasy truce with the miners while the state considered ending the convict lease system.

In the first case, State v. Jenkins, the state had sued TCMC president B.A. Jenkins for threatening to close one of the company's mines if the miners did not fire their checkweighman (who weighed the coal for which the miners were paid). The state argued this violated a state law that granted miners the right to an independent checkweighman. Turney ruled against the state, arguing that while the law prevented mine owners from directly firing checkweighmen, it did not prevent mine owners from closing mines should miners refuse their demands to fire checkweighmen.

In the second case, State v. Jack, a convict, William Warren (with the help of the striking miners), had filed a writ of habeas corpus challenging TCMC's authority to hold him prisoner, arguing that the state's primary convict lessee, Tennessee Coal, Iron and Railway Company (TCI), violated its contract with the state by subleasing convicts to TCMC. A lower court had ruled in favor of Warren, and ordered him returned to the state's direct custody. Turney, however, overruled the lower court, arguing that the TCMC stockade was essentially a "branch prison" of the state, and that a convict in a state prison could not file for habeas corpus.

== Governor ==
In 1892, Turney sought the Democratic Party's nomination for governor, hoping to replace incumbent Governor Buchanan. He quickly gained the support of the party's Bourbon and pro-business factions, who had grown frustrated with Buchanan's handling of the Coal Creek War. Buchanan, lacking the support to win renomination, withdrew from the party to run as an independent, and Turney coasted to the party's nomination. In the general election, Turney was elected governor with 127,247 votes to 100,629 for the Republican candidate, George Winstead, 31,515 for Buchanan, and 5,427 for Prohibition candidate Edward H. East.

Although Turney had issued rulings favorable to the convict lease system as Chief Justice, upon becoming governor, he quickly signed legislation (April 1893) that effectively ended the controversial practice. The legislation called for the construction of a state penitentiary and the purchase of coal and farm lands where inmates would work. This allowed the state to defray the costs of prison maintenance while preventing convict labor from competing with free market labor.

While Turney had resolved the convict lease issue, the Democratic Party was assailed for its ineffective response to the Panic of 1893. In the 1894 governor's race, Republicans nominated Henry Clay Evans, a former congressman who had been gerrymandered out of office for supporting the Lodge Bill. Though Turney painted Evans as a carpetbagger, Evans ran an effective campaign, and the initial vote tally on election day indicated Evans had won with 105,104 votes to 104,356 for Turney, and 23,088 for Populist candidate A.J. Mims. The Democratic-controlled legislature, however, declared voter fraud had occurred, and negated over 23,000 votes, allowing Turney to win the election by 2,000 votes.

Turney never recovered from the fallout from the "stolen" election of 1894. During his second term, he began organizing the state's centennial celebrations, but his efforts were inadequate, and the celebrations were delayed until the Summer of 1897, after he had left office.

== Later life and legacy ==
Turney did not seek reelection in 1896, and did not seek public office again afterward. He died in Winchester, Tennessee, in 1903, and was buried in the Winchester City Cemetery.

The state penitentiary authorized during Turney's administration, Brushy Mountain State Penitentiary, operated from 1896 to 2009. The coal and farm lands purchased as part of the prison complex are now part of Frozen Head State Park. In tribute to Turney's prison reform efforts, the Turney Center for Youthful Offenders (now the Turney Center Industrial Complex), which opened in 1971 in Hickman County, was named in his honor.

Turney's brother, Joe, used his political connections to manage a chain gang for financial gain, inspiring a famous blues song, "Joe Turner," which in turn inspired August Wilson's play, Joe Turner's Come and Gone.

== Family ==
Turney married his first wife, Cassandra Garner, in 1851. They had three children. After his first wife died in 1857, he married as his second wife, Hannah Graham, in 1858. They had nine children.

== See also ==
- List of governors of Tennessee

== Notes ==
Party political offices
Preceded by John P. Buchanan	Democratic nominee for Governor of Tennessee; 1892, 1894	Succeeded by Robert Love Taylor
Political offices
Preceded by John P. Buchanan	Governor of Tennessee; 1893–1897	Succeeded by Robert Love Taylor
