= Jere Baxter =

American politician

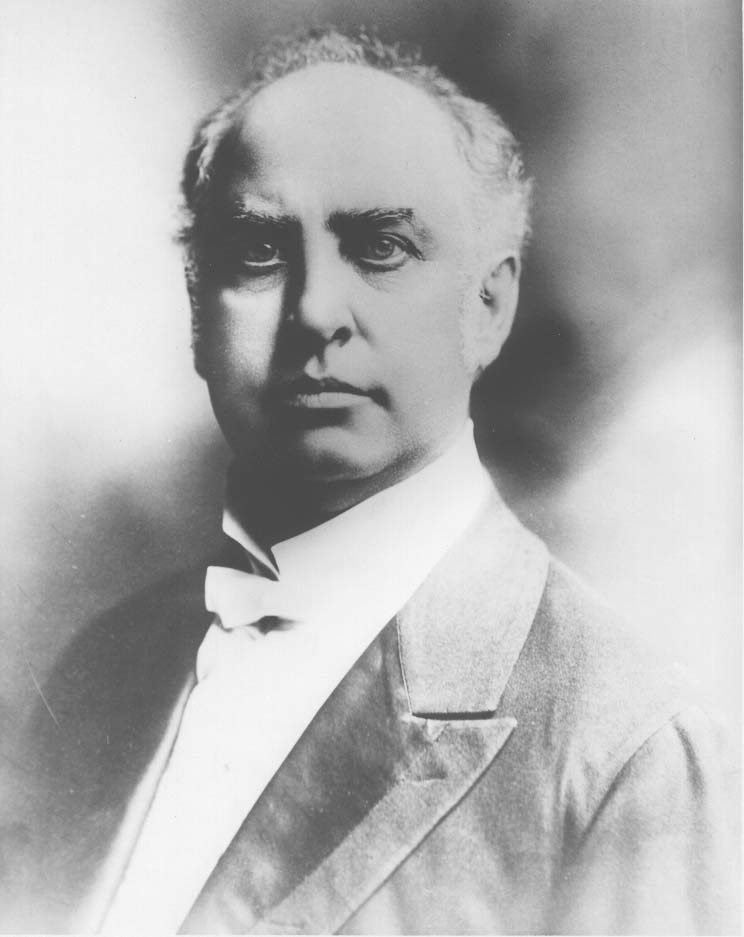
- Jere Baxter, c. 1900
- Born: February 11, 1852; Nashville, Tennessee
- Died: February 29, 1904 (aged 52)
- Resting place: Mount Olivet Cemetery
- Education: Montgomery Bell Academy
- Occupation: Businessman

Jere Baxter (February 11, 1852 – February 29, 1904) was an American businessman, lawyer, and politician. He was the founder of the Tennessee Central Railroad.

== Early life ==
Jere Baxter was born on February 11, 1852, in Nashville, Tennessee. His father, Nathaniel Baxter, was a politician and judge. After graduating from Montgomery Bell Academy, he studied law.

== Career ==
Baxter went into legal publishing, issuing The Legal Reporter, the nine-volume bound compilation of which came to be commonly known as Baxter's Reports.

Baxter founded the Tennessee Central Railroad and helped found the communities of South Pittsburg, Tennessee, and Sheffield, Alabama. He served in the Tennessee State Senate, and unsuccessfully sought the Democratic Party nomination for governor of Tennessee in 1890.

Baxter had a very public argument with Whitefoord Russell Cole over the Tennessee Central Railroad in the early 1900s.

== Death and legacy ==
Baxter died on February 29, 1904. Baxter, Tennessee, is named for him. He was buried in Mount Olivet Cemetery.
