= Lodge Bill =

1890 election bill proposed in the U.S. Congress

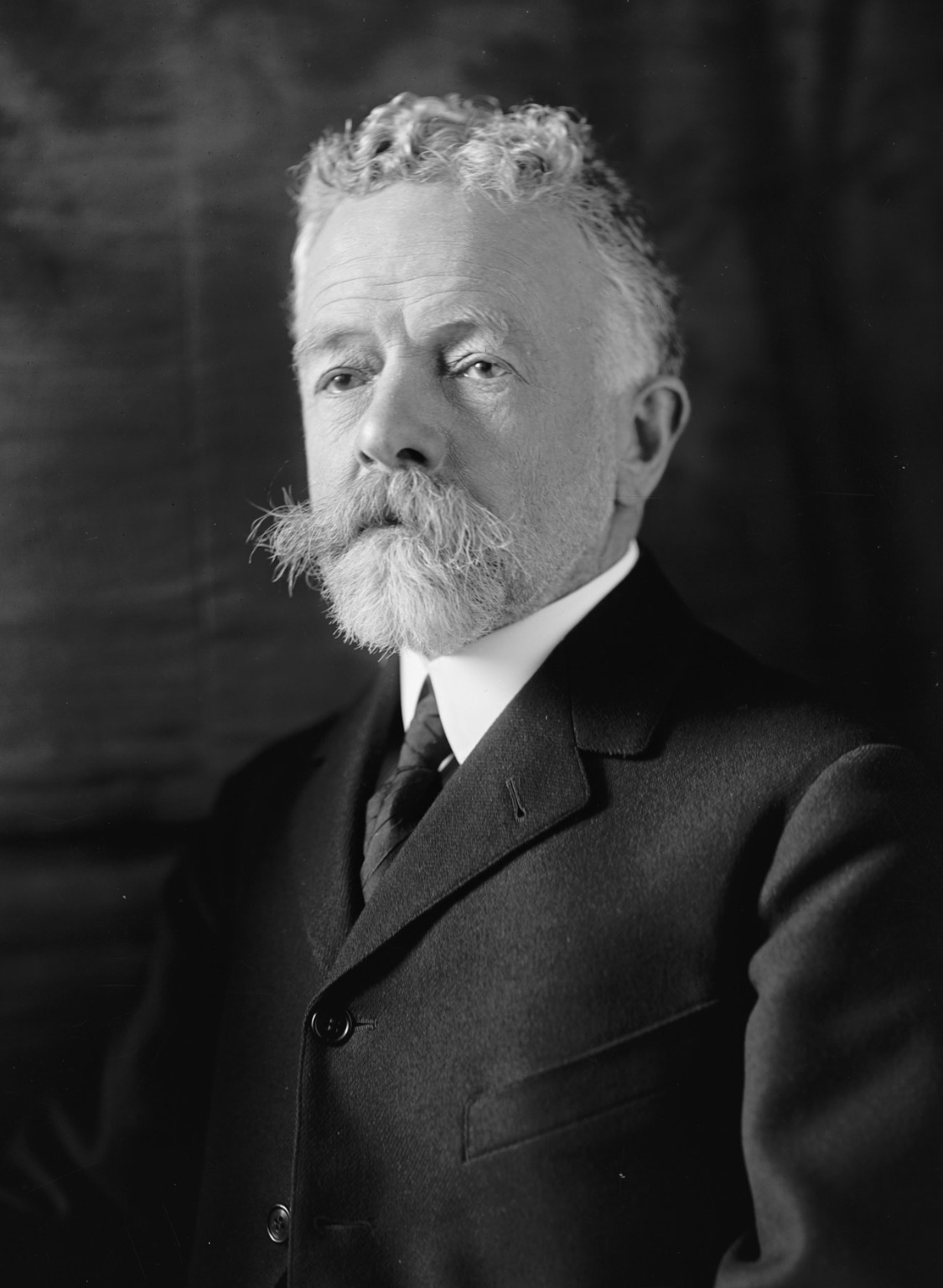
Henry Cabot Lodge, sponsor of the bill (1905)

The Lodge bill of 1890, also referred to as the Federal Elections bill or by critics as the Force bill, was a proposed bill in the 51st United States Congress (1889–91) for the federal regulation of elections to the United States House of Representatives. It was drafted and proposed by U.S. representative Henry Cabot Lodge of Massachusetts and sponsored in the Senate by George F. Hoar, also of Massachusetts. The bill would have permitted United States circuit courts to appoint federal supervisors for congressional elections upon a petition of five hundred citizens from any district. Supervisors would have the authority to attend elections, inspect registration lists, verify doubtful voter information, administer oaths to challenged voters, prevent non-citizens from voting, and certify the vote count. One of the bill's most controversial provisions provided elections supervisors the authority to request deputy United States Marshals to secure elections by force, if necessary.

The bill was an effort to enforce the Fifteenth Amendment to the United States Constitution, which formally prohibited the denial of the franchise on the basis of race but included no mechanism for enforcement, in response to a string of controversial elections and electoral reforms during the period since the 1877 withdrawal of the United States military from the Southern states. From 1877 to 1890, elections in the Southern United States were marred by violence, terrorism, and allegations of electoral fraud, resulting in frequent intervention and reversal of election results by the United States House Committee on Elections.

After passing the House by just six votes on July 2, the Democratic minority in the Senate made the first modern use of the filibuster to defeat the bill. Levi P. Morton, who as vice president of the United States was presiding over the Senate, took little action. Senate Republicans instead prioritized passage of the Sherman Silver Purchase Act and McKinley Tariff. Many Southern states soon formalized restrictions on voting in their state constitutions, including poll taxes and literacy tests, which were explicitly directed at restricting the voting rights and habits of African Americans. Serious efforts for general enforcement of the Fifteenth Amendment were not pursued again for several decades until the civil rights movement, culminating in the passage of the Voting Rights Act of 1965.

== Background ==
=== Fifteenth Amendment and Second Enforcement Acts (1870–71) ===
The Fifteenth Amendment to the United States Constitution, which was ratified in 1870, states:

Section 1. The right of citizens of the United States to vote shall not be denied or abridged by the United States or by any State on account of race, color, or previous condition of servitude.
Section 2. The Congress shall have power to enforce this article by appropriate legislation.

The amendment was ratified following the Union victory in the American Civil War and the ratification of the Thirteenth and Fourteenth amendments, abolishing the practice of chattel slavery and guaranteeing equal protection under the law. Both predecessor amendments contained enforcement clauses similar to Section 2 above, empowering Congress to pass "appropriate legislation" to ensure their enforcement. In 1870 and 1871, the 41st and 42nd United States congresses passed the Enforcement Acts, a series of federal laws designed to prevent interference with civil rights by state governments or rebel terrorist groups, such as the Ku Klux Klan. Each of the Enforcement Acts passed along party lines, with nearly unanimous support from the Republican Party against nearly unanimous opposition by the Democratic Party, reflecting the post-war racial and regional split in Congress.

In particular, the Second Enforcement Act, passed in 1871, shifted the responsibility for enforcing voting rights from local officials to the federal government, in the form of federal judges and the United States Marshals Service. The Second Enforcement Act permitted any two citizens in a town with more than 20,000 residents to petition the federal government for oversight of general elections, including elections for local, state, and federal offices. However, the Acts faced immediate legal challenges which generally resulted in federal courts watering down their effect, and in United States v. Reese (1876), Supreme Court chief justice Morrison Waite held that the act was unconstitutionally broad because it punished election officials without limiting the offenses to strict racial discrimination, as permitted in Section 1 of the Fifteenth Amendment. However, in Ex parte Siebold (1879) and Ex parte Yarbrough (1884), the Supreme Court upheld the authority of Congress over federal elections, respectively upholding convictions under the Second Enforcement Act of state election judges for ballot stuffing and Ku Klux Klansmen for voter intimidation.

=== Disfranchisement after the Reconstruction era (1877–90) ===
In 1877, the United States military withdrew from the former Confederate States of America, effectively ending the Reconstruction era and exacerbating the issues which the Reconstruction amendments were aimed at addressing.

Especially after 1877, the Democratic Party utilized aggressive machine politics, electoral fraud, economic coercion, and targeted voter intimidation to systematically reduce the rate of African American and Republican participation in elections throughout the South. South Carolina senator Benjamin Tillman later bragged about this period, "How did we recover our liberty? By fraud and violence. We tried to overcome the thirty thousand majority by honest methods, which was a mathematical impossibility. After we had borne these indignities for eight years life became worthless under such conditions. ... In 1878 we had to resort to more fraud and violence, and so again in 1880." Southern states also began to pass laws designed to limit access to voting rights, including poll taxes, literacy tests, and multi-box balloting systems, while avoiding explicit racial discrimination as outlawed under the Fifteenth Amendment.

== Drafting ==
In the 1888 elections, the Republican Party ran on a platform explicitly stating that the federal government had an absolute "obligation" to secure voting rights for all male citizens. In addition to humanitarian motives for proposing such legislation, Republicans viewed the restoration of African American voting rights in the otherwise Democratic South as a pathway to permanent majority status; given that the vast majority of African American voters supported the Republicans, this would ensure competitive elections in the South and deprive the Democratic Party of safe territory anywhere in the country.

The 1888 elections resulted in narrow Republican victories in the elections for president, Senate, and House of Representatives, providing the party with a government trifecta for the first time since 1875. Speaker of the House Thomas Brackett Reed appointed Henry Cabot Lodge, a second-term representative from Massachusetts, as chair of the powerful House Committee on Elections. Lodge then collaborated with Massachusetts senator George F. Hoar to draft the legislation and develop a legislative strategy for its passage; Lodge undertook the lion's share of the drafting while Hoar prepared to lend his seniority to navigate its passage in the Senate. Both Lodge and Hoar had a background in constitutional law and personal connections to Massachusetts's history as the center of American abolitionism.

== Support ==
The Lodge bill was overwhelmingly supported by the Republican Party. It was strongly endorsed by President Benjamin Harrison.

The bill also received enthusiastic support from African American leaders and politicians, including the U.S. representatives John Mercer Langston, Thomas E. Miller, and Henry P. Cheatham. In August 1890, Julius Caesar Chappelle gave a political speech supporting the bill at Boston's Faneuil Hall to support the federal elections bill which was featured on the front page of The New York Age. The National Afro-American League was founded by T. Thomas Fortune in early 1890 in part to support the Lodge bill.

== Opposition ==
Reaction against the bill was immediately hostile. Opponents branded it a new "force bill," recalling descriptions of the Enforcement Acts two decades earlier. Local Southern leaders threatened a boycott of Northern manufacturing, and Democratic U.S. senator James L. Pugh claimed that if enacted, the bill would "insure the shedding of blood." Some Republicans also expressed opposition to the bill for fear of violence. Daniel Lindsay Russell, a future Republican governor of North Carolina, wrote to Hoar to express his belief that the bill's "defeat ... will save the lives of many of us."

Writing almost one hundred years later, historian J. Morgan Kousser referred to the campaign against the bill as one "of distortion and vilification perhaps unparalleled in the annals of American legislation." In addition to partisan Democratic and Southern newspapers, The New York Times and The Washington Post waged aggressive campaigns against the bill prior to its passage in the House.

== Procedural history ==
=== House passage ===
The Lodge bill was formally introduced as House Resolution (H.R.) 11045 in June 1890. The Democratic minority in the House attempted initially to kill the bill under a "disappearing quorum" tactic, by which members physically present in the chamber remained silent when called to vote; Speaker Reed implemented strict procedural rules to count these members as present but not voting. On July 2, 1890, the bill narrowly passed the House by a vote of 155–149. None of the Democratic representatives voted in favor of the bill.

=== Senate debate and failure ===
Upon its arrival in the Senate, the bill faced the first modern filibuster in United States Senate history. It also struggled for time against two key pieces of the Republican Party's economic agenda, the Sherman Silver Purchase Act and the McKinley Tariff. The Democratic Senate minority reached an agreement with the western wing of the Republican majority, which prioritized the subsidy to silver mining proposed in the Sherman bill over civil rights legislation, to kill the Lodge bill. The bill did not come for a vote before the fall recess, when members of Congress returned home for the election season. In the 1890 elections, the Republican Party suffered major political defeats, losing control of the House of Representatives and only maintaining control of the Senate through the addition of six new seats from Idaho, Montana, and Wyoming.

In December, the 51st Congress reconvened for a lame-duck session following the election, the Democratic Senate minority was invigorated by their new popular support and launched an aggressive, grueling 33-day filibuster to block a final vote on the Lodge bill. Because the Senate rules at the time lacked a mechanism to invoke cloture and end debate, the minority brought all legislation to a standstill to block the bill. On January 22, 1891, the filibuster was ended by a coalition of Democratic and western Republican senators, who successfully forced a vote to postpone further debate on the Lodge bill in favor of legislation to address ongoing currency issues. The motion passed by a single vote, 35–34, and the bill was never brought up for consideration again.

== Aftermath ==
The threat and failure of the Lodge bill spurred an immediate response in the Southern states, which passed new laws and state constitutions to further limit voting access for African Americans, beginning a period referred to as the nadir of American race relations.

The Lodge bill proved to be the last relic of Republican Party efforts towards civil rights. In 1919, the NAACP wrote Lodge (by then a leading United States senator) to ask him to again draft a voting rights bill. Lodge never responded, as he and other Republicans were more focused on women's suffrage, World War I, and the Spanish flu epidemic.

The Lodge bill did serve as a precursor of 20th century civil rights legislation, including the Voting Rights Act of 1965, which outlawed many discriminatory voting practices, including literacy tests.

=== Historiography ===
In the 1900s, the Dunning school of American history established the history of the Lodge bill as one of resistance to one-party domination, in which "power-obsessed Republicans [had sought] to resurrect sectionalism during an era of reconciliation." In the 1960s, with the revival of voting rights as a political issue nationally, revisionist historians argued that at least some Republicans acted out of "genuine desire for racial justice and concern about voting practices."

Further studies since the civil rights era have deepened the complexity. In 2000, Alexander Keyssar concluded that, "Republicans supported the Federal Elections Bill for a mixture of partisan and principled reasons."

Several historians, including Charles W. Calhoun, have used the defeat of the Lodge bill (rather than the 1877 withdrawal of federal troops) to mark the final end of Reconstruction.

== See also ==
- Henry Cabot Lodge
- Giles v. Harris, 189 U.S. 475 (1903)
- Voter suppression
