= Walter P. Brownlow =

American politician

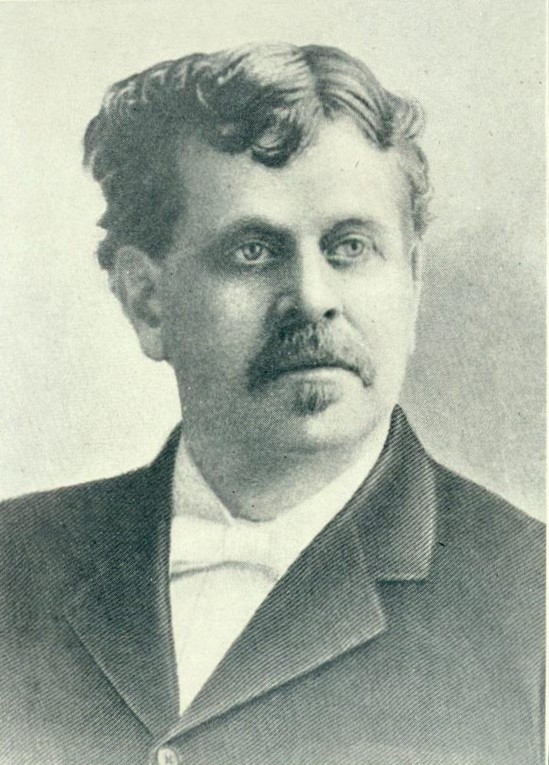

Member of the U.S. House of Representatives from Tennessee's 1st district
- In office March 4, 1897 – July 8, 1910
- Preceded by: William C. Anderson
- Succeeded by: Zachary D. Massey

Personal details
- Born: March 27, 1851 Abingdon, Virginia, US
- Died: July 8, 1910 (aged 59) Johnson City, Tennessee, US
- Party: Republican
- Spouse: Clayetta Ashland Holbach (m. 1870)
- Relations: William G. Brownlow (uncle); James P. Brownlow (cousin)
- Children: 6
- Profession: Newspaper editor

Walter Preston Brownlow (March 27, 1851 – July 8, 1910) was an American politician who represented Tennessee's 1st district in the U.S. House of Representatives from 1897 until his death in 1910. He is remembered for obtaining large federal appropriations for his district, as well as for his intraparty political battles with Chattanoogans Henry Clay Evans and Newell Sanders over control of the state Republican Party. Along with his congressional tenure, Brownlow served as Doorkeeper of the United States House of Representatives from 1881 to 1883, and published the Jonesboro Herald and Tribune from 1876 to 1910.

Brownlow was a nephew of Tennessee's radical post-Civil War governor, William "Parson" Brownlow.

== Early life ==
Brownlow was born in Abingdon, Virginia, the son of Joseph and Mary (Barr) Brownlow. He attended common schools for three years until his father's death in 1861. Needing to earn a living, he worked as a telegraph messenger boy. At the age of 13, during the Civil War, he attempted to join the Union Army, but was rejected due to his age. After the war, he worked as an apprentice to his brother in the tinning trade in Rogersville, Tennessee, and later worked as an engineer on the Rogersville and Jefferson Railroad.

In 1876, Brownlow was hired as a reporter by the Knoxville Whig and Chronicle, a newspaper that had been founded by his uncle's protégé, William Rule (and at the time co-owned by his uncle). He generally covered political campaigns that year, namely the canvasses of Augustus H. Pettibone and Emerson Etheridge. In October 1876, he purchased the Jonesboro Herald and Tribune, which he would publish and edit until his death in 1910.

Brownlow was a delegate to the 1880 Republican National Convention, and was appointed postmaster at Jonesborough, Tennessee, in 1881. In December 1881, he was appointed Doorkeeper of the United States House of Representatives for the 47th Congress (1881–1883), a position which controlled entry to the House floor. His Assistant Doorkeeper was Richard W. Austin, his future political ally. Brownlow worked as superintendent of the Senate's folding room, where Senate documents were processed and distributed to the public, from 1885 to 1893. After leaving this position, he briefly worked in the office of Congressman Alfred A. Taylor.

== Congress and state party politics ==
Brownlow first ran for the 1st district congressional seat in 1894. At the state party's convention, he was deadlocked for the nomination with William Coleman Anderson before finally withdrawing his name, allowing Anderson to win on the 144th ballot. In 1896, he again sought the nomination in a three-way race with Anderson and W.E.F. Milburn. Unlike the 1894 campaign, candidates for the 1896 election were chosen in a primary, which Brownlow won, capturing 8,843 votes to 6,590 for Milburn and 5,448 for Anderson. In the general election, he defeated the Democratic candidate, Lacey Lawrence, 25,075 to 13,916.

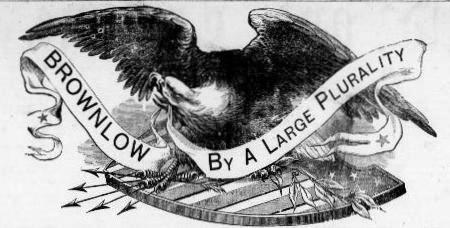
Illustration that appeared in the Jonesboro Herald and Tribune in April 1896, following Brownlow's primary victory

By the mid-1890s, the Tennessee Republican Party had divided into two quarreling factions, one led by Brownlow, the other led by ex-Congressman Henry Clay Evans (the quarrel primarily involved the distribution of federal patronage). This feud continued throughout Brownlow's congressional career (and for several years after his death). Brownlow's supporters included Richard W. Austin, John E. McCall, Foster V. Brown, and Knoxville businessmen Edward J. Sanford, James A. Fowler and William J. Oliver. His cousins, the children and grandchildren of his famous uncle, remained influential in the Knoxville area. Evans' supporters included Chattanooga businessman Newell Sanders and Knoxville politician Nathan W. Hale.

At the 1896 Republican National Convention, Brownlow and Austin helped thwart Evans' bid for the vice presidential nomination. Outmaneuvering Evans, Brownlow was elected the state's delegate to the Republican National Committee, where he befriended Mark Hanna, the campaign manager for presidential candidate William McKinley. Brownlow's relationship with Hanna and McKinley would prove key in helping him obtain and distribute federal patronage during the late 1890s. In 1897, the newly elected McKinley considered appointing Evans postmaster general, but chose James A. Gary instead, in part due to Brownlow's opposition to Evans. After Evans was appointed Commissioner of Pensions, Brownlow tried unsuccessfully to have him fired.

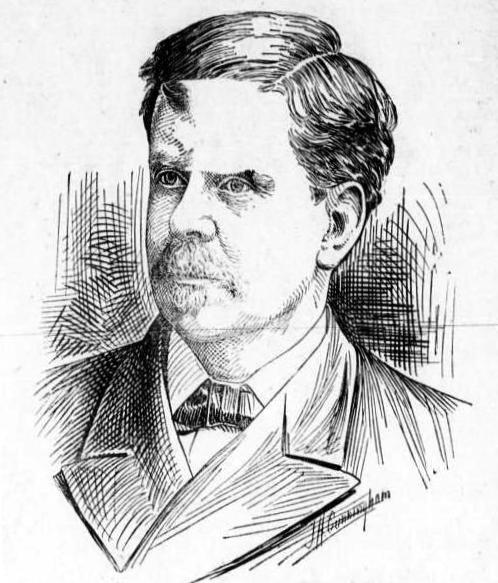
Congressman Brownlow, c. 1897

By 1900, Brownlow effectively controlled the Tennessee Republican Party. At the state party convention in Nashville that year, Brownlow was elected chairman, and his allies on the committee granted him the power to reject any candidate for office. Outraged, Evans and his supporters marched out of the convention, and held a rival convention across town. Both conventions sent delegates to the 1900 Republican National Convention, but Brownlow's were awarded most of the state's seats. Brownlow easily beat back a primary challenge from Judge H. Tyler Campbell that year. John E. McCall, a Brownlow ally, was the party's nominee for governor.

Brownlow's hold on the party showed signs of breaking in 1904, when his candidate, Austin, was defeated by the Evans-backed candidate, Hale, for the open seat of retiring 2nd district congressman Henry R. Gibson. Numerous state Republicans grew weary of Brownlow's control of the party. Sam R. Sells accused Brownlow of using questionable means to pack state conventions, and John Chiles Houk called for an investigation into Brownlow's tactics. After Evans defeated the Brownlow-backed candidate, T. Asbury Wright, for the 1906 gubernatorial nomination, Brownlow ruthlessly assailed both Evans and Sanders, alienating still more supporters, and allowing the Evans block to regain control of the state party. Popular former congressman Alfred A. Taylor ran against Brownlow as an independent in the 1st district, but Brownlow was easily reelected.

Following Evans' loss to Malcolm R. Patterson in the general election, Sanders assumed control of his political block, and managed to have several political allies appointed to postmaster positions across the state. In 1908, though he was weakened considerably by illness, Brownlow attempted to regain control of the state party. His friend, William J. Oliver, led an armed mob to Nashville, took control of the state party convention, and had Brownlow allies elected as delegates to the 1908 Republican National Convention. The Sanders faction sent its own group of delegates, however, and they were awarded the state's seats after the national committee learned of Oliver's actions.

In 1910, Brownlow was renominated for his congressional seat. Although Sanders-backed Ben W. Hooper was nominated over his preferred candidate, Alfred Taylor, for the party's gubernatorial candidate, Hooper was generally viewed as being neutral in the factional fighting, and was on good terms with the Brownlow faction.

=== Congressional accomplishments ===
Brownlow's 1902 proposal for a "Bureau of Public Roads" was the first bill initiated in Congress for a unified system of national, state and local roads. Though the bill failed to pass, it helped lay the groundwork for what eventually become the Bureau of Public Roads (now the Federal Highway Administration), which was established with the Federal Aid Road Act of 1916.

In 1906, Brownlow secured the establishment of a national cemetery for President Andrew Johnson in Greeneville, and inserted a request in the 1907 appropriations bill for improvements to the cemetery. When a northern representative attempted to remove the request, Brownlow launched into a tirade. He argued that his district "furnished more soldiers to the Union service during the dark days of the rebellion than any Congressional district in the United States," and praised Johnson as "the greatest patriot of the civil war." Following this speech, the funding request was restored to the bill.

Arguably the most lasting accomplishment of Brownlow's career was the establishment of the "Mountain Branch" of the National Home for Disabled Volunteer Soldiers near Johnson City, Tennessee, by an Act of Congress dated January 28, 1901. Forty years after the Civil War, the "Soldiers Home" was developed on an unprecedented scale and modeled after the European tradition of institutions providing care for disabled soldiers of Europe's numerous wars during the 18th and 19th centuries.

In securing passage of his proposal for the Soldiers Home, Brownlow encountered numerous difficulties. At first, the Congressionally-appointed board governing veterans benefits refused to hear him, stating that the policy was to discourage homes established by the federal government and support only those developed by the states. Brownlow asked to appear before the Veterans Board for five minutes to present his proposal. He told the Board members of the thousands of men in the South and particularly in the First District of Tennessee that risked their lives and fortunes supporting the Union. Brownlow stated that the federal government had recently approved a large sum of money for the establishment of a prison at Atlanta so that southern prisoners would not suffer the rigors of the cold and unfamiliar northern climate. Brownlow concluded his argument with the point that the old soldiers were certainly entitled to as much consideration as were convicts. At the end of his plea, the Board informed him that the members unanimously endorsed his plan for a million-dollar appropriation.

Situated on a 450-acre (1.8 km^{2}) campus, the National Soldiers Home included a hospital, lodging for over 3,000 American Civil War veterans, a zoo, a Carnegie library, two lakes, and numerous other amenities all within a park-like setting that was a tribute to landscape architecture of that era. Today, the campus houses a major Veterans Affairs Center as well as the East Tennessee State University College of Medicine and Pharmacy. On June 30, 2011, the National Soldiers' Home campus was named a National Historic Landmark.

Though a champion of Southern Unionist causes, Brownlow delivered a memorial address on the House floor for Senator Isham G. Harris, who had been one of his uncle's bitterest enemies during the Civil War. He did likewise for Senator William B. Bate, a former Confederate general, in 1907.

According to a cousin, Louis Brownlow, Walter Brownlow once stated, "The best legislator is the one who votes for all appropriations and against all taxes." He also once expressed frustration with the patronage system, stating, "Every job I get for a man nets me one ingrate and twelve enemies."

== Family ==
Brownlow married Clayetta Ashland Holbach in 1870, and they had six children, five of whom lived into adulthood: three daughters and two sons.

== Death ==
Brownlow died at the National Soldiers’ Home (where he had an apartment) in Johnson City on July 8, 1910, at the age of 59. He is interred at the Mountain Home National Cemetery, where a large obelisk marks his grave.

== See also ==
- Federal-Aid Highway Act
- List of members of the United States Congress who died in office (1900–1949)

U.S. House of Representatives
Preceded by William C. Anderson	Member of the U.S. House of Representatives from Tennessee's 1st congressional district March 4, 1897 - July 8, 1910	Succeeded by Zachary D. Massey
