= Landon Carter Haynes =

American and Confederate politician (1816 – 1875)

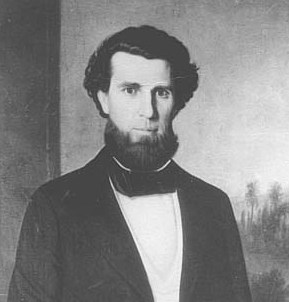
- Haynes, from a portrait by Samuel Shaver

Confederate States Senator from Tennessee
- In office February 18, 1862 – May 10, 1865
- Preceded by: Constituency established
- Succeeded by: Constituency abolished

Speaker of the Tennessee House of Representatives
- In office 1849–1851
- Preceded by: Brookins Campbell
- Succeeded by: Jordan Stokes

Personal details
- Born: December 2, 1816 Elizabethton, Tennessee, U.S.
- Died: February 17, 1875 (aged 58) Memphis, Tennessee, U.S.
- Resting place: Jackson Cemetery; Jackson, Tennessee
- Party: Democratic
- Relations: Nathaniel G. Taylor (brother-in-law); Alfred A. Taylor (nephew); Robert Love Taylor (nephew)
- Education: Washington College
- Profession: Attorney

Landon Carter Haynes (December 2, 1816 – February 17, 1875) was an American politician who served as a Confederate States senator from Tennessee from 1862 to 1865. He also served several terms in the Tennessee House of Representatives, including one term as speaker (1849–1851). In the early 1840s, Haynes worked as editor of the Jonesborough-based newspaper, Tennessee Sentinel, garnering regional fame for his frequent clashes with rival editor William "Parson" Brownlow.

Following the Civil War, Haynes moved to Memphis where he practiced law. His Tipton-Haynes Place farm near Johnson City (a city previously named “Haynesville” in his honor during the Civil War) is now a state historic site.

== Early life ==
Haynes was born near Elizabethton, Tennessee, the eldest child of David Haynes, a land speculator, and Rhoda (Taylor) Haynes. He attended the Anderson School in Carter County and graduated from Washington College near Jonesborough in 1838. Returning to Elizabethton, he read law with Thomas A.R. Nelson. When Nelson moved to Jonesborough in 1840, Haynes followed him to continue his study of law. He was admitted to the bar in late 1840.

While still in Elizabethton, Haynes began to quarrel with William G. "Parson" Brownlow, a former circuit rider who had left the ministry in 1839 to publish and edit the Whig, a radically pro-Whig newspaper (he had been encouraged to establish this paper by Haynes's mentor, Nelson). In March 1840, Brownlow accused Haynes of an assassination attempt after an unknown assailant fired two shots at him; Haynes suggested Brownlow fabricated the entire incident. A few weeks later, Brownlow attacked Haynes with a cane, igniting a brawl that ended with Haynes drawing a pistol and shooting Brownlow in the thigh.

In 1841, Haynes was hired as editor of the Tennessee Sentinel, a pro-Democratic Party newspaper that had been published by his brother-in-law Lawson Gifford since 1835. Over the next five years, Haynes and Brownlow engaged in a ruthless editorial war. Brownlow described Haynes as a "public debauchee and hypocrite," and accused him of stealing corn and selling diseased hogs. Haynes mocked Brownlow's lineage, dubbed him a "wretched abortion of sin," and charged that he had once been flogged for stealing jewelry in Nashville.

In 1842, Haynes converted to Methodism and was licensed to preach as a Methodist minister. In December, he began to quarrel with long-time minister C.W.C. Harris, who questioned his behavior during his feud with Brownlow. At a church conference in January 1843, Haynes charged Harris with falsehood, but Harris was acquitted. Harris then charged Haynes with falsehood at a conference in February, and Haynes was found guilty and barred from the ministry. Crowing about the incident in the Whig, Brownlow stated that Haynes had been hanged "on the gallows he prepared for another."

== Tennessee politics, 1844–1859 ==
Although a Whig in his youth, Haynes joined the Democratic Party in 1839. In 1844, he was an elector for James K. Polk, while his old mentor, Nelson, was an elector for Henry Clay. While canvassing for Polk, Haynes honed his skills as an orator, delivering eloquent speeches in favor of Democratic positions, such as the annexation of Texas. At one event, he accused Whigs of being "latitudinarious," prompting taunts from Brownlow, who stated there was no such word. Haynes and Nelson would later serve as the respective electors for Lewis Cass and Zachary Taylor in 1848.

Haynes was elected to the Tennessee House of Representatives in 1845. As a legislator, he supported a repeal of the "quart" law (which banned the sale of liquor in quantities of less than one quart), tried to amend the bill chartering Jackson College to obtain funds for Washington College and Tusculum, and tried to amend a banking bill to establish branches of the state bank in each of the state's grand divisions. In 1847 he was elected to the Tennessee Senate. In this capacity, he helped obtain funding for railroad construction and improvements to the upper Holston River. He returned to the House in 1849, where he was elected speaker by a 38–31 vote and continued championing railroad construction.

In 1851, a sizeable faction of the Democratic Party, angry with the policies of incumbent 1st district congressman Andrew Johnson, convinced Haynes to run against him in the general election (the Whig Party opted not to field a candidate). In what would prove to be one of Johnson's toughest campaigns, the two candidates canvassed the district together, engaging in fierce debates in front of large crowds. Haynes criticized Johnson's support for the Homestead Bill, arguing it was an abolitionist measure, and accused Johnson of having opposed railroad construction and supporting Whig candidates. Johnson noted that Haynes had voted for Whig Governor Newton Cannon in 1839 and pointed out that Haynes had been expelled from the Methodist ministry. Johnson won the election by just over 1,600 votes.

After a hiatus in which he focused on his law practice, Haynes reentered politics in 1859 when he again ran for Congress. This time, his opponent was his old law mentor Nelson. Haynes championed states' rights and secession, while Nelson ran on a pro-Union platform. Unlike the 1851 campaign, the 1859 canvass was relatively cordial, with Haynes at one point coming to Nelson's defense after a newspaper had misquoted him. On election day, Nelson edged Haynes by just 90 votes.

== American Civil War ==
During the presidential election of 1860, Haynes was an at-large elector for John C. Breckinridge, a position which required him to canvass the entire state. At one point, he jointly campaigned with his brother-in-law Nathaniel G. Taylor, who was an elector for John Bell. In January 1861, following Abraham Lincoln's victory, Haynes joined a growing chorus of Tennesseans who called for the state to align itself with the burgeoning Confederate States of America.

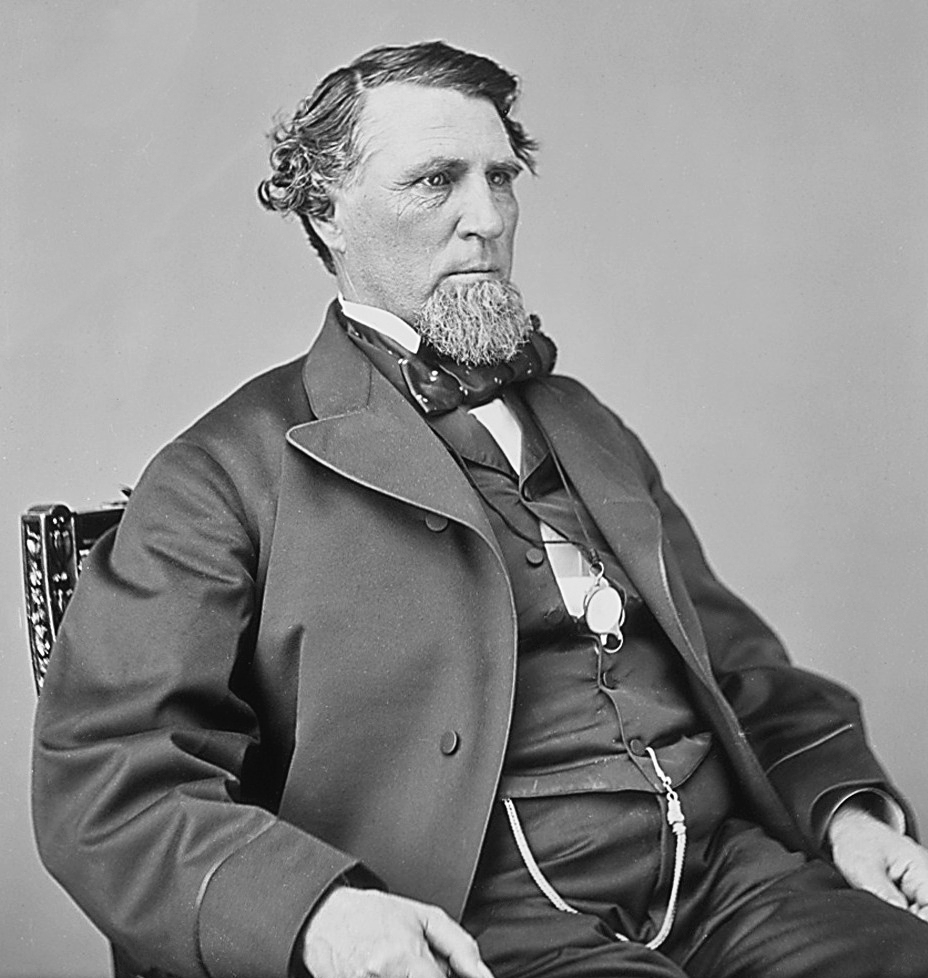
Haynes, photographed by Mathew Brady during the Civil War

In July 1861, after Tennessee had seceded, Haynes wrote to Confederate Secretary of War LeRoy P. Walker, warning him that East Tennessee was a hotbed of pro-Union activity and expressing concerns that Unionists might attack bridges along the critical East Tennessee and Virginia Railroad (the latter of which was realized in November when Union guerrillas destroyed five railroad bridges in the region). He asked that Confederate troops be sent to occupy parts of East Tennessee to discourage Unionists, which Walker granted.

On October 24, 1861, the Tennessee General Assembly elected Haynes to one of the state's two seats in the Confederate Senate (the other went to Gustavus A. Henry). As a senator, he sought higher pay for troops and introduced legislation that would allow pay for POWs to be sent to their families. He supported conscription but sought exemptions for members of state militias and overseers of plantations with 20 or more slaves. He supported the continued suspension of habeas corpus but called for an end to martial law and demanded that any civilians arrested for pro-Union activities be tried in civilian courts. Haynes favored fiscal conservatism and called for the sale of cotton and tobacco to buy back Confederate-issued bank notes, which had depreciated.

As the war came to an end in 1865, Haynes moved to Memphis and was granted amnesty by his old congressional opponent, Andrew Johnson, who was now president. In June 1866, however, he was arrested and indicted for treason by a Knoxville court (possibly at the urging of Brownlow, who was now governor). In a letter to Johnson seeking another pardon, he argued that he would not receive a fair trial in Knoxville, since, "Mr. Brownlow ... does not love me with the tenderness of sensibility which his pious profession and Christian duties require him to do." Johnson granted the pardon a few days later.

== Later life ==
Haynes spent the remainder of his life in Memphis practicing law. In 1872 he attended a banquet in Jackson, Tennessee, where he was introduced by Nathan B. Forrest, who pointed out that Haynes was from the "godforsaken" pro-Union region of East Tennessee. Haynes responded with a speech, "East Tennessee: An Apostrophe," in which he reminisced about the region's beauty and longed to return. The speech was republished numerous times in subsequent years. Haynes died in Memphis on February 17, 1875. He was initially buried in the city's Elmwood Cemetery but was reinterred in Jackson Cemetery in Jackson in 1902.

== Legacy ==
For decades after his death, Haynes was remembered primarily for his speaking ability. Nelson described him as the "Cicero of America", and author Frank Richardson (1831–1912) called him a "silver-tongued orator". During the Civil War, Johnson's Depot, near Haynes's farm, was renamed "Haynesville" in his honor. After the war, the town reverted to its original name and incorporated as Johnson City shortly afterward. Before his move to Memphis, Haynes sold his farm, the Tipton-Haynes Place, to his brother-in-law Lawson Gifford. In 1945, Gifford's grandson sold the farm to the Tennessee Historical Commission. The farm is now managed as the Tipton-Haynes State Historic Site.

== Personal life ==
Haynes's paternal ancestors were of English (Haynes) and German (Meckendorfer and Kern) descent. His maternal ancestors were of Irish descent. His brother-in-law, Nathaniel G. Taylor (married to his sister Emaline), was a Whig congressman and Unionist. Taylor's sons (Haynes's nephews) included Alfred A. Taylor (1848–1931) and Robert Love Taylor (1850–1912), who both served as governor of Tennessee. During the Civil War, Haynes's father, David, protected the family's property by telling Union soldiers he was the father-in-law of Nathaniel G. Taylor, while telling Confederate soldiers he was the father of Landon Carter Haynes.

Haynes married Eleanor Powell around 1840. They had six children: Robert, James, Helen, Mary, David and Joseph. Robert Haynes, son of Landon, represented Madison County in the Tennessee state legislature in the 1880s.

Confederate States Senate
New constituency	Confederate States Senator (Class 3) from Tennessee; 1862–1865; Served alongside: Gustavus Henry	Constituency abolished
