= Sabine Hall =

Sabine Hall is the name of multiple notable buildings, including:

- Sabine Hall (Garden City, Kansas)
- Sabine Hall (Warsaw, Virginia)

== See also ==
- Sabine Hill, house in Elizabethton, Tennessee
