= William Coleman Anderson =

American politician

Member of the U.S. House of Representatives from Tennessee's 1st district
- In office March 4, 1895 – March 3, 1897
- Preceded by: Roderick R. Butler
- Succeeded by: Walter P. Brownlow

Personal details
- Born: July 10, 1853 Tusculum, Tennessee, U.S.
- Died: September 8, 1902 (aged 49) Newport, Tennessee, U.S.
- Party: Republican
- Spouse: Blanche Anderson
- Children: 2
- Education: Tusculum College
- Profession: Attorney; newspaper editor

William Coleman Anderson (July 10, 1853 – September 8, 1902) was an American politician and a US Representative from Tennessee's first district.

== Biography ==
Anderson was born at Tusculum, near Greeneville, Tennessee. He attended a rural school, then graduated from Tusculum College in 1876.

== Career ==
Anderson moved to Newport, Tennessee, in 1876, and while studying law, he was assistant clerk of Cocke County from 1877 to 1878. Admitted to the bar in 1878, he commenced practice in Newport. He served as a member of the State house of representatives from 1881 to 1883. He was a principal examiner in the General Land Office at Washington, D.C., from 1889 to 1892; promoted to chief of the contest division February 1, 1892, but resigned August 7, 1892. He was made chief of the General Land Office, and served from November 23, 1892, until April 11, 1893. returned to Newport, Cocke County, in 1893 and resumed the practice of law.

Elected as a Republican to the United States House of Representatives from Tennessee in 1894, Anderson served from March 4, 1895, to March 3, 1897.

Anderson was founder and editor of Plain Talk, a weekly newspaper published in Newport. He was also member of the city council at the time of his death.

== Death ==
Anderson died on September 8, 1902, from typhoid fever, in Newport, Tennessee. He is interred at Union Cemetery, Newport, Tennessee.

U.S. House of Representatives
| Preceded by Alfred A. Taylor | Member of the U.S. House of Representatives from Tennessee's 1st congressional district 1895–1897 | Succeeded by Walter P. Brownlow |
