= Brookins Campbell =

American politician (1808–1853)

Member of the U.S. House of Representatives from Tennessee's 1st district
- In office March 4, 1853 – December 25, 1853
- Preceded by: Andrew Johnson
- Succeeded by: Nathaniel G. Taylor

Speaker of the Tennessee House of Representatives
- In office 1845–1847
- Preceded by: Daniel L. Barringer
- Succeeded by: Landon Carter Haynes

Member of the Tennessee House of Representatives
- In office 1835–1839; 1841–1846; 1851–1853

Personal details
- Born: 1808 Washington County, Tennessee
- Died: December 25, 1853 (aged 44–45) Washington, D.C.
- Resting place: Providence Presbyterian Churchyard; Greene County, Tennessee
- Party: Democratic
- Spouse: Mary (Morrow) Campbell

Brookins Campbell (1808 – December 25, 1853) was an American politician and a member of the United States House of Representatives for the 1st congressional district of Tennessee.

== Biography ==
He was born in Washington County, Tennessee, in 1808. He attended the rural schools and graduated from Washington College, now known as Washington and Lee University, at Lexington. He studied law, was admitted to the bar, and practiced. He was a member of the Tennessee House of Representatives from 1835 to 1839, from 1841 to 1846, and from 1851 to 1853. He served as Speaker in 1845.

During the Mexican–American War, he was appointed by President Polk in 1846 to be an assistant quartermaster to the Army with the rank of major. He was elected as a Democrat to the Thirty-third Congress and served from March 4, 1853, until his death in Washington, D.C., on December 25, 1853, without having qualified. He was interred in Providence Presbyterian Churchyard in Greene County, Tennessee.

== See also ==
- List of members of the United States Congress who died in office (1790–1899)

U.S. House of Representatives
Preceded by Andrew Johnson	Member of the U.S. House of Representatives from Tennessee's 1st congressional district March 4, 1853 – December 25, 1853	Succeeded by Nathaniel G. Taylor
