= Butler House (Mountain City, Tennessee) =

Historic house in Tennessee, United States

- U.S. National Register of Historic Places
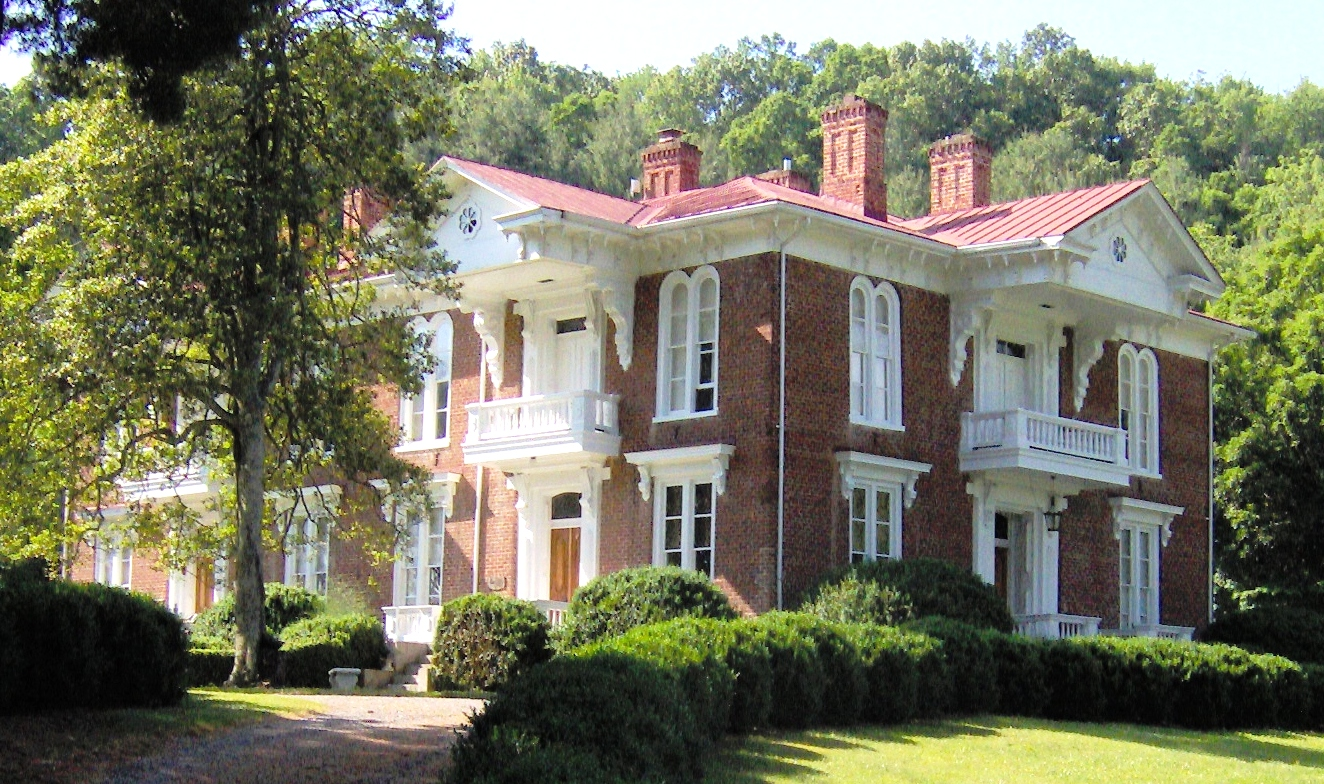
- The Butler House in 2009

- Location within Tennessee
- Location: 309 North Church Street, Mountain City, Tennessee
- Coordinates: 36°28′19″N 81°48′7″W
- Area: 5 acres (2.0 ha)
- Built: 1871
- Architectural style: Italianate
- NRHP reference No.: 73001798
- Added to NRHP: April 11, 1973

The Butler House is a historic mansion in Mountain City, Tennessee, United States. It was built for Congressman Roderick R. Butler circa 1871, and designed in the Italianate architectural style. It has been listed on the National Register of Historic Places since April 11, 1973.
