= Zachary D. Massey =

American politician (1864–1923)

Zachary David Massey

Member of the U.S. House of Representatives from Tennessee's 1st district
- In office November 8, 1910 – March 3, 1911
- Preceded by: Walter P. Brownlow
- Succeeded by: Sam R. Sells

Member of the Tennessee Senate
- In office 1904–1906

Personal details
- Born: November 14, 1864 Marshall, North Carolina, U.S.
- Died: July 13, 1923 (aged 58) Sevierville, Tennessee, U.S.
- Party: Republican
- Spouse: Sally Josephine Mullendore Massey
- Children: 6
- Education: Louisville Medical College

Military service
- Allegiance: United States of America
- Branch/service: United States Army
- Rank: Assistant surgeon
- Unit: 6th U.S. Volunteer Infantry
- Battles/wars: Spanish–American War

Zachary David Massey (November 14, 1864 – July 13, 1923) was an American politician and physician who represented Tennessee's 1st congressional district in 1910 and 1911.

== Early life ==
Massey was born on November 14, 1864, in Marshall, North Carolina, the son of Robert Hardy and Tempa Arena Brown Massey. He attended the public schools.

== Career ==
Massey taught in the public schools of Marshall from 1882 to 1886. He studied medicine in the Louisville Medical College and commenced the practice of his profession in Wears Valley, Tennessee, in 1889. He moved to Sevierville, Tennessee, in 1890.

During the Spanish–American War, Massey served as an assistant surgeon with 6th Infantry Regiment also known as the "Sixth Immunes." The unit served its term of service in the continental U.S. and Puerto Rico from 1898 to 1899.

After Massey was the postmaster of Sevierville from 1899 to 1904; he then was a member of the Tennessee Senate from 1904 to 1906.

Massey was elected as a Republican to the Sixty-first Congress to fill the vacancy caused by the death of Walter P. Brownlow. He served from November 8, 1910, to March 3, 1911, but he was not a candidate for renomination in 1910. He resumed the practice of medicine and also engaged in the real estate business.

== Personal life ==
Massey married Sally Josephine Mullendore on November 25, 1886, and they had six children, Beulah, Roy, Blanche, Constance, Juanita, and Robert. On July 13, 1923, Massey died in Sevierville, Tennessee. He is interred at Shiloh Cemetery.

U.S. House of Representatives
Preceded by Walter P. Brownlow	Member of the U.S. House of Representatives from Tennessee's 1st congressional district November 8, 1910 - March 3, 1911	Succeeded by Sam R. Sells
