= Nathaniel Green Taylor =

American politician (1819–1887)

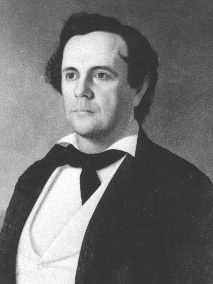

15th Commissioner of Indian Affairs
- In office March 26, 1867 – 1869
- President: Andrew Johnson
- Preceded by: Lewis V. Bogy
- Succeeded by: Ely S. Parker

Member of the U.S. House of Representatives from Tennessee's 1st district
- In office July 24, 1866 – March 3, 1867
- Preceded by: Thomas Amos Rogers Nelson
- Succeeded by: Roderick R. Butler
- In office March 30, 1854 – March 3, 1855
- Preceded by: Brookins Campbell
- Succeeded by: Albert Galiton Watkins

Personal details
- Born: December 29, 1819 Happy Valley, Carter County, Tennessee, U.S.
- Died: April 1, 1887 (aged 67) Happy Valley, Carter County, Tennessee, U.S.
- Party: Whig; American; Union; Conservative
- Spouse: Emma Haynes Taylor
- Relations: Alfred A. Taylor (son); Robert Love Taylor (son); William B. Carter (uncle); Samuel P. Carter (cousin); Landon Carter Haynes (brother-in-law)
- Education: Washington College Academy Princeton University
- Profession: lawyer, farmer, preacher

Nathaniel Green Taylor (December 29, 1819 – April 1, 1887) was an American lawyer, farmer, and politician from Tennessee. He was U.S. Representative from Tennessee from 1854 to 1855, and again from 1866 to 1867, and Commissioner of Indian Affairs from 1867 to 1869.

== Early life and family ==
Taylor was born at Happy Valley in Carter County, Tennessee, the son of James Patton Taylor (1792–1833) and his wife, the former Mary Carter (1799–1840). His family was prominent in Carter County. His paternal grandfather, General Nathaniel Taylor (1771–1816), a native of Rockbridge County, Virginia, was among the area's early settlers and the county's first sheriff; he began the construction of Sabine Hill in Elizabethton. His maternal grandfather, Landon Carter (1760–1800), an American Revolutionary War veteran, was the man for whom Carter County was named.

Nathaniel Green Taylor received his education privately before entering Washington College near Jonesborough, Tennessee. He graduated from Princeton College in 1840, studied law, and was admitted to the bar in 1841. He began his legal practice in Elizabethton, Tennessee in Carter County and eventually owned slaves.

Taylor married Emmaline (Emma) Haynes (1822–1890), the sister of Democratic politician Landon Carter Haynes (Speaker of the Tennessee House and later a Confederate senator from Tennessee). Two of their six sons, Alfred A. Taylor (1848–1931) and Robert Love Taylor (1850–1912), were each elected to Congress and as governor of Tennessee, as Republican and Democratic candidates, respectively. The remaining seven children who survived both parents included sons James Patton Taylor (1844–1924), Nathaniel Winfield Taylor (1852–1904), David Haynes Taylor (1858–1890) and Hugh Lawson McClung Taylor (1859–1935), and daughters Mary Eva Taylor Jobe (1855–1916), Rhoda Emma Taylor Reeves (1855–1943), and Sanna McClung Taylor Miller (1862–1941).

== Political career ==
In 1849, Nathaniel G. Taylor was a candidate for election to the U.S. House of Representatives in the Tennessee First U.S. House, eventually losing the general election to Democrat Andrew Johnson of Greene County, who would later become the 16th vice president and the 17th president of the United States.

In 1853, Taylor was one of two Whig candidates for U.S. Representative in Tennessee's 1st congressional district. He lost to Democrat Brookins Campbell, by only 138 votes out of 14,900 cast in a three-way race. (3,988 votes went to rival Whig Albert Watkins, incumbent Representative from the 2nd district, who had been moved to the 1st district by reapportionment.)

Campbell never qualified to take his seat in Congress, and died on December 25, 1853. A special election was held in 1854 to fill the remainder of the term. Taylor won, and served in the Thirty-third Congress from March 30, 1854 to March 3, 1855. Though Taylor sought re-election in 1855, this time Watkins (now running as a Democrat), won a narrow victory, by 270 votes out of 15,292 cast. In 1857, Taylor ran as the "American" candidate (the Whig Party having broken up) against Watkins. This proved another narrow loss, by 170 votes out of 15,118 cast. Taylor did not run in 1859.

In 1860, Taylor served as a presidential elector for the Constitutional Union ticket of Bell and Everett (both former Whigs).

During the Civil War, Taylor adhered to the Union cause despite Tennessee's joining the Confederacy. He joined a group to assist Southern Unionist residents of East Tennessee under Confederate rule, and also lectured on their behalf throughout the northeastern U.S.

Tennessee was readmitted to representation in Congress in 1866. Taylor was again elected Representative from the 1st district, this time as a Conservative candidate. The Conservatives had split from the Union coalition that supported the national government during the war and was led by War Democrat Andrew Johnson, also a resident of East Tennessee. Taylor served in the Thirty-ninth Congress from July 24, 1866 to March 3, 1867.

Taylor did not run for re-election in 1867. Instead, Johnson, now President, appointed Taylor Commissioner of Indian Affairs effective March 26, 1867. Taylor served as Commissioner for about two years, until he retired. Meanwhile, he traveled to Kansas to attempt to settle the Plains Wars, and took his 19-year-old son Alfred along. As head of the Indian Peace Commission, Taylor negotiated the Medicine Lodge Treaty, by which southern Plains Indians (the Kiowa, Apache and Comanche), agreed to remove to a reservation in Indian Territory and ceded their traditional lands including present-day Kansas.

Upon retiring on April 21, 1869, Taylor returned to Tennessee and devoted himself to farming and preaching in Carter County.

In 1886, when his sons Alfred and Robert ran for governor on the Republican and Democratic tickets, respectively, the Prohibition Party offered its nomination to Nathaniel Taylor in hopes of making it a three-way family race, but Taylor declined.

== Death ==
Taylor died in Happy Valley, Tennessee on April 1, 1887, and is interred alongside other family members within the Old Taylor Cemetery that is, itself, landlocked within private property and located off Sylvan Hill Road in Elizabethton, Tennessee.

U.S. House of Representatives
Preceded by Brookins Campbell	Member of the U.S. House of Representatives from Tennessee's 1st congressional district 1854–1855	Succeeded by Albert Galiton Watkins
Preceded by Vacant	Member of the U.S. House of Representatives from Tennessee's 1st congressional district 1866–1867	Succeeded by Roderick R. Butler
