= Tennessee's 1st congressional district =

U.S. House district for Tennessee

Coordinates: 36°12′45″N 82°48′00″W

- Interactive map of district boundaries since January 3, 2023 (Note: The district includes the same census blocks as drawn for the 2020 redistricting cycle in 2022 and during mid-decade redistricting in 2026. As such, boundaries of the district will not change at the 2026 elections.)
- Representative: Diana Harshbarger; R–Kingsport
- Distribution: 57.46% urban; 42.54% rural
- Population (2025): 800,990
- Median household income: $62,379
- Ethnicity: 87.9% White; 4.9% Hispanic; 3.7% Two or more races; 2.1% Black; 0.8% Asian; 0.6% other
- Cook PVI: R+29

Tennessee's 1st congressional district is the congressional district for northeast Tennessee, including all of Carter, Cocke, Greene, Hamblen, Hancock, Hawkins, Johnson, Sullivan, Unicoi, Washington, and Sevier counties, as well as nearly all of Jefferson County with the exception of Strawberry Plains. It is largely coextensive with the Tennessee portion of the Tri-Cities region of northeast Tennessee and southwest Virginia. With a Cook Partisan Voting Index rating of R+29, it is the most Republican district in Tennessee and the third most Republican in the country. The district, as shaped for the 119th Congress, has the second lowest median income of the state's districts, at $55,431. It also ranks second in the state with the poverty rate at 15.9 percent, per a 2026 congressional study.

Cities and towns represented within the district include Blountville, Bristol, Church Hill, Elizabethton, Erwin, Gatlinburg, Greeneville, Johnson City, Jonesborough, Kingsport, Morristown, Mountain City, Newport, Pigeon Forge, Roan Mountain, Rogersville, Sneedville, Sevierville, and Tusculum. The 1st district's seat in the U.S. House of Representatives has been held by Republicans since 1881.

The district was created in 1805 when the at-large seat was divided into multiple districts.

The district's current representative is Republican Diana Harshbarger, who was first elected in 2020 following the retirement of Republican Phil Roe.

== Recent election results from statewide races ==
Year	Office	Results
2008	President	McCain 70% - 29%
2012	President	Romney 74% - 26%
2016	President	Trump 76% - 20%
2018	Senate	Blackburn 71% - 28%
2018	Governor	Lee 76% - 23%
2020	President	Trump 76% - 22%
2020	Senate	Hagerty 77% - 21%
2022	Governor	Lee 78% - 20%
2024	President	Trump 78% - 21%
2024	Senate	Blackburn 78% - 20%

== History ==
The 1st district has generally been a very secure voting district for the Republican Party since the American Civil War, and is one of only two ancestrally Republican districts in the state (the other being the neighboring 2nd district).

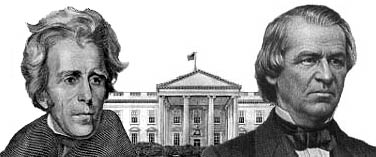
Democratic U.S. Representatives Andrew Jackson (1796–1797, at large) and Andrew Johnson (1843–1853, 1st) represented this area and later served as president of the United States.

Republicans (or their antecedents) have held the seat continuously since 1881 and for all but four years since 1859, while Democrats (or their antecedents) held the congressional seat for all but eight years from when Andrew Jackson was first elected to the U.S. House of Representatives in 1796 (as the state's single at-large representative) up to the term of Albert Galiton Watkins, which ended in 1859.

Andrew Johnson, the seventeenth president of the United States, represented the district from 1843 to 1853.

Like the rest of East Tennessee, slavery was not as common in this area as in the rest of the state due to its mountain terrain, which was dominated by small farms instead of plantations. The district was also the home of the first exclusively abolitionist periodicals in the nation, The Manumission Intelligencer and The Emancipator, founded in Jonesborough by Elihu Embree in 1819.

The 1st district was one of four districts in Tennessee whose congressmen did not resign when Tennessee seceded from the Union in 1861. Thomas Amos Rogers Nelson was reelected as a Unionist to the Thirty-seventh Congress, but he was arrested by Confederate troops while en route to Washington, D.C. and taken to Richmond. Nelson was paroled and returned home to Jonesborough, where he kept a low profile for the length of his term.

Due to these factors, this area — except for "Little Confederacy" Sullivan County, with its deep ties to neighboring Virginia — supported the Union over the Confederacy in the Civil War, and identified with the Republican Party after Tennessee was readmitted to the Union in 1866, electing candidates representing the Union Party — a merger of Republicans and pro-Union Democrats — both before and after the war. This allegiance has continued through good times and bad ever since, with Republicans dominating every level of government. While a few Democratic pockets exist in the district's urban areas, they are not enough to sway the district. Since 1898, Democrats have only crossed the 40 percent barrier twice, in 1962 and 1976.

The district's Republican bent is no less pronounced at the presidential level. It was one of the few areas of Tennessee where Barry Goldwater did well in 1964. Johnson, Carter, Unicoi, Washington, Cocke, Sevier, and Hancock Counties are among the few counties in the country to have never supported a Democrat for president since the Civil War. Franklin D. Roosevelt turned in respectable showings in the district during his four runs for president, as did Jimmy Carter in 1976. However, Carter is the last Democrat to carry any county in the district, and apart from Sullivan County, which, except in the Catholicism-dominated 1928 election, was consistently Democratic up to 1948, and Hamblen County in the 1976 election, no county in the present district has backed a Democrat for president since 1940.

The district typically gives its congressmen very long tenures in Washington; indeed, it elected some of the few truly senior Southern Republican congressmen before the 1950s. Only nine people (not counting caretakers) have represented it since 1911. Two of them, B. Carroll Reece and Jimmy Quillen, are the longest-serving members of the House in Tennessee history. Reece held the seat for all but six years from 1921 to 1961, while Quillen held it from 1963 to 1997.

== Composition ==
For the 118th and successive Congresses (based on redistricting following the 2020 census), the district contains all or portions of the following counties and communities:

Carter County (8)

All 8 communities

Cocke County (3)

All 3 communities

Greene County (5)

All 5 communities

Hamblen County (3)

All 3 communities

Hancock County (1)

Sneedville

Hawkins County (8)

All 8 communities

Jefferson County (6)

Baneberry, Dandridge, Jefferson City, Morristown (shared with Hamblen County), New Market, White Pine

Johnson County (2)

Butler, Mountain City

Sevier County (6)

All 6 communities

Sullivan County (11)

All 11 communities

Unicoi County (3)

All 3 communities

Washington County (9)

All 9 communities

== List of members representing the district ==
Representative	Party	Years	Cong ress	Electoral history	District location
District established March 4, 1805
John Rhea (Blountville)	Democratic-Republican	March 4, 1805 – March 3, 1813	9th 10th 11th 12th 13th	Redistricted from the at-large district and re-elected in 1805. Re-elected in 1807. Re-elected in 1809. Re-elected in 1811. Re-elected in 1813. Lost re-election.	1805–1813 "Washington district": Carter, Greene, Hawkins, Sullivan, and Washington counties
John Rhea (Blountville)	Democratic-Republican	March 4, 1813 – March 3, 1815	9th 10th 11th 12th 13th	Redistricted from the at-large district and re-elected in 1805. Re-elected in 1807. Re-elected in 1809. Re-elected in 1811. Re-elected in 1813. Lost re-election.	1813–1823; Carter, Greene, Hawkins, Sullivan, and Washington counties
Samuel Powell (Rogersville)	Democratic-Republican	March 4, 1815 – March 3, 1817	14th	Elected in 1815. Retired.	1813–1823; Carter, Greene, Hawkins, Sullivan, and Washington counties
John Rhea (Blountville)	Democratic-Republican	March 4, 1817 – March 3, 1823	15th 16th 17th	Elected in 1817. Re-elected in 1819. Re-elected in 1821. Retired.	1813–1823; Carter, Greene, Hawkins, Sullivan, and Washington counties
John Blair (Jonesboro)	Democratic-Republican	March 4, 1823 – March 3, 1825	18th 19th 20th 21st 22nd 23rd	Elected in 1823. Re-elected in 1825. Re-elected in 1827. Re-elected in 1829. Re-elected in 1831. Re-elected in 1833. Lost re-election.	1823–1833; Carter, Greene, Hawkins, Sullivan, and Washington counties
John Blair (Jonesboro)	Jacksonian	March 4, 1825 – March 3, 1835	18th 19th 20th 21st 22nd 23rd	Elected in 1823. Re-elected in 1825. Re-elected in 1827. Re-elected in 1829. Re-elected in 1831. Re-elected in 1833. Lost re-election.	1823–1833; Carter, Greene, Hawkins, Sullivan, and Washington counties
John Blair (Jonesboro)	Jacksonian	March 4, 1825 – March 3, 1835	18th 19th 20th 21st 22nd 23rd	Elected in 1823. Re-elected in 1825. Re-elected in 1827. Re-elected in 1829. Re-elected in 1831. Re-elected in 1833. Lost re-election.	1833–1843 [data missing]
William B. Carter (Elizabethton)	Anti-Jacksonian	March 4, 1835 – March 3, 1837	24th 25th 26th	Elected in 1835. Re-elected in 1837. Re-elected in 1839. Retired.	1833–1843 [data missing]
William B. Carter (Elizabethton)	Whig	March 4, 1837 – March 3, 1841	24th 25th 26th	Elected in 1835. Re-elected in 1837. Re-elected in 1839. Retired.	1833–1843 [data missing]
Thomas D. Arnold (Greeneville)	Whig	March 4, 1841 – March 3, 1843	27th	Elected in 1841. Retired.	1833–1843 [data missing]
Andrew Johnson (Greeneville)	Democratic	March 4, 1843 – March 3, 1853	28th 29th 30th 31st 32nd	Elected in 1842. Re-elected in 1845. Re-elected in 1847. Re-elected in 1849. Re-elected in 1851. Retired to run for Governor of Tennessee.	1843–1853 [data missing]
Brookins Campbell (Washington College)	Democratic	March 4, 1853 – December 25, 1853	33rd	Elected in 1853. Died.	1853–1861 [data missing]
Vacant		December 25, 1853 – March 30, 1854	33rd		1853–1861 [data missing]
Nathaniel G. Taylor (Happy Valley)	Whig	March 30, 1854 – March 3, 1855	33rd	Elected to finish Campbell's term. Lost re-election.	1853–1861 [data missing]
Albert G. Watkins (Panther Springs)	Democratic	March 4, 1855 – March 3, 1859	34th 35th	Elected in 1855. Re-elected in 1857. Retired.	1853–1861 [data missing]
Thomas A. R. Nelson (Jonesboro)	Opposition	March 4, 1859 – March 3, 1861	36th	Elected in 1859. Re-elected in 1861, but captured en route to Congress and failed to take his seat.	1853–1861 [data missing]
District inactive		March 4, 1861 – July 24, 1866	37th 38th 39th	Civil War and Reconstruction	
Nathaniel G. Taylor (Happy Valley)	Union	July 24, 1866 – March 3, 1867	39th	Elected in 1865. Retired.	1866–1873 [data missing]
Roderick R. Butler (Taylorsville)	Republican	March 4, 1867 – March 3, 1875	40th 41st 42nd 43rd	Elected in 1867. Re-elected in 1868. Re-elected in 1870. Re-elected in 1872. Lost re-election.	1866–1873 [data missing]
Roderick R. Butler (Taylorsville)	Republican	March 4, 1867 – March 3, 1875	40th 41st 42nd 43rd	Elected in 1867. Re-elected in 1868. Re-elected in 1870. Re-elected in 1872. Lost re-election.	1873–1883 [data missing]
William McFarland (Morristown)	Democratic	March 4, 1875 – March 3, 1877	44th	Elected in 1874. Lost re-election.	1873–1883 [data missing]
James H. Randolph (Newport)	Republican	March 4, 1877 – March 3, 1879	45th	Elected in 1876. Retired.	1873–1883 [data missing]
Robert L. Taylor (Jonesboro)	Democratic	March 4, 1879 – March 3, 1881	46th	Elected in 1878. Lost re-election.	1873–1883 [data missing]
Augustus H. Pettibone (Greeneville)	Republican	March 4, 1881 – March 3, 1887	47th 48th 49th	Elected in 1880. Re-elected in 1882. Re-elected in 1884. Retired.	1873–1883 [data missing]
Augustus H. Pettibone (Greeneville)	Republican	March 4, 1881 – March 3, 1887	47th 48th 49th	Elected in 1880. Re-elected in 1882. Re-elected in 1884. Retired.	1883–1893 [data missing]
Roderick R. Butler (Mountain City)	Republican	March 4, 1887 – March 3, 1889	50th	Elected in 1886. Retired.	1883–1893 [data missing]
Alfred A. Taylor (Johnson City)	Republican	March 4, 1889 – March 3, 1895	51st 52nd 53rd	Elected in 1888. Re-elected in 1890. Re-elected in 1892. Retired.	1883–1893 [data missing]
Alfred A. Taylor (Johnson City)	Republican	March 4, 1889 – March 3, 1895	51st 52nd 53rd	Elected in 1888. Re-elected in 1890. Re-elected in 1892. Retired.	1893–1903 [data missing]
William C. Anderson (Newport)	Republican	March 4, 1895 – March 3, 1897	54th	Elected in 1894. Lost renomination.	1893–1903 [data missing]
Walter P. Brownlow (Jonesboro)	Republican	March 4, 1897 – July 8, 1910	55th 56th 57th 58th 59th 60th 61st	Elected in 1896. Re-elected in 1898. Re-elected in 1900. Re-elected in 1902. Re-elected in 1904. Re-elected in 1906. Re-elected in 1908. Died.	1893–1903 [data missing]
Walter P. Brownlow (Jonesboro)	Republican	March 4, 1897 – July 8, 1910	55th 56th 57th 58th 59th 60th 61st	Elected in 1896. Re-elected in 1898. Re-elected in 1900. Re-elected in 1902. Re-elected in 1904. Re-elected in 1906. Re-elected in 1908. Died.	1903–1913 [data missing]
Vacant		July 8, 1910 – November 8, 1910	61st		1903–1913 [data missing]
Zachary D. Massey (Sevierville)	Republican	November 8, 1910 – March 3, 1911	61st	Elected to finish Brownlow's term. Retired.	1903–1913 [data missing]
Sam R. Sells (Johnson City)	Republican	March 4, 1911 – March 3, 1921	62nd 63rd 64th 65th 66th	Elected in 1910. Re-elected in 1912. Re-elected in 1914. Re-elected in 1916. Re-elected in 1918. Lost renomination.	1903–1913 [data missing]
Sam R. Sells (Johnson City)	Republican	March 4, 1911 – March 3, 1921	62nd 63rd 64th 65th 66th	Elected in 1910. Re-elected in 1912. Re-elected in 1914. Re-elected in 1916. Re-elected in 1918. Lost renomination.	1913–1933; Carter, Claiborne, Cocke, Grainger, Greene, Hancock, Hawkins, Johnson, Sevier, Sullivan, Unicoi, and Washington counties
B. Carroll Reece (Butler)	Republican	March 4, 1921 – March 3, 1931	67th 68th 69th 70th 71st	Elected in 1920. Re-elected in 1922. Re-elected in 1924. Re-elected in 1926. Re-elected in 1928. Lost renomination.	1913–1933; Carter, Claiborne, Cocke, Grainger, Greene, Hancock, Hawkins, Johnson, Sevier, Sullivan, Unicoi, and Washington counties
Oscar B. Lovette (Greeneville)	Republican	March 4, 1931 – March 3, 1933	72nd	Elected in 1930. Lost renomination.	1913–1933; Carter, Claiborne, Cocke, Grainger, Greene, Hancock, Hawkins, Johnson, Sevier, Sullivan, Unicoi, and Washington counties
B. Carroll Reece (Johnson City)	Republican	March 4, 1933 – January 3, 1947	73rd 74th 75th 76th 77th 78th 79th	Elected in 1932. Re-elected in 1934. Re-elected in 1936. Re-elected in 1938. Re-elected in 1940. Re-elected in 1942. Re-elected in 1944. Retired to serve as chairman of the Republican National Committee.	1933–1943 [data missing]
B. Carroll Reece (Johnson City)	Republican	March 4, 1933 – January 3, 1947	73rd 74th 75th 76th 77th 78th 79th	Elected in 1932. Re-elected in 1934. Re-elected in 1936. Re-elected in 1938. Re-elected in 1940. Re-elected in 1942. Re-elected in 1944. Retired to serve as chairman of the Republican National Committee.	1943–1953 [data missing]
Dayton E. Phillips (Elizabethton)	Republican	January 3, 1947 – January 3, 1951	80th 81st	Elected in 1946. Re-elected in 1948. Lost renomination.	1943–1953 [data missing]
B. Carroll Reece (Johnson City)	Republican	January 3, 1951 – March 19, 1961	82nd 83rd 84th 85th 86th 87th	Elected in 1950. Re-elected in 1952. Re-elected in 1954. Re-elected in 1956. Re-elected in 1958. Re-elected in 1960. Died.	1943–1953 [data missing]
B. Carroll Reece (Johnson City)	Republican	January 3, 1951 – March 19, 1961	82nd 83rd 84th 85th 86th 87th	Elected in 1950. Re-elected in 1952. Re-elected in 1954. Re-elected in 1956. Re-elected in 1958. Re-elected in 1960. Died.	1953–1963 [data missing]
Vacant		March 19, 1961 – May 16, 1961	87th		1953–1963 [data missing]
Louise Reece (Johnson City)	Republican	May 16, 1961 – January 3, 1963	87th	Elected to finish her husband's term. Retired.	1953–1963 [data missing]
Jimmy Quillen (Kingsport)	Republican	January 3, 1963 – January 3, 1997	88th 89th 90th 91st 92nd 93rd 94th 95th 96th 97th 98th 99th 100th 101st 102nd 103rd 104th	Elected in 1962. Re-elected in 1964. Re-elected in 1966. Re-elected in 1968. Re-elected in 1970. Re-elected in 1972. Re-elected in 1974. Re-elected in 1976. Re-elected in 1978. Re-elected in 1980. Re-elected in 1982. Re-elected in 1984. Re-elected in 1986. Re-elected in 1988. Re-elected in 1990. Re-elected in 1992. Re-elected in 1994. Retired.	1963–1973 [data missing]
Jimmy Quillen (Kingsport)	Republican	January 3, 1963 – January 3, 1997	88th 89th 90th 91st 92nd 93rd 94th 95th 96th 97th 98th 99th 100th 101st 102nd 103rd 104th	Elected in 1962. Re-elected in 1964. Re-elected in 1966. Re-elected in 1968. Re-elected in 1970. Re-elected in 1972. Re-elected in 1974. Re-elected in 1976. Re-elected in 1978. Re-elected in 1980. Re-elected in 1982. Re-elected in 1984. Re-elected in 1986. Re-elected in 1988. Re-elected in 1990. Re-elected in 1992. Re-elected in 1994. Retired.	1973–1983 [data missing]
Jimmy Quillen (Kingsport)	Republican	January 3, 1963 – January 3, 1997	88th 89th 90th 91st 92nd 93rd 94th 95th 96th 97th 98th 99th 100th 101st 102nd 103rd 104th	Elected in 1962. Re-elected in 1964. Re-elected in 1966. Re-elected in 1968. Re-elected in 1970. Re-elected in 1972. Re-elected in 1974. Re-elected in 1976. Re-elected in 1978. Re-elected in 1980. Re-elected in 1982. Re-elected in 1984. Re-elected in 1986. Re-elected in 1988. Re-elected in 1990. Re-elected in 1992. Re-elected in 1994. Retired.	1983–1993 [data missing]
Jimmy Quillen (Kingsport)	Republican	January 3, 1963 – January 3, 1997	88th 89th 90th 91st 92nd 93rd 94th 95th 96th 97th 98th 99th 100th 101st 102nd 103rd 104th	Elected in 1962. Re-elected in 1964. Re-elected in 1966. Re-elected in 1968. Re-elected in 1970. Re-elected in 1972. Re-elected in 1974. Re-elected in 1976. Re-elected in 1978. Re-elected in 1980. Re-elected in 1982. Re-elected in 1984. Re-elected in 1986. Re-elected in 1988. Re-elected in 1990. Re-elected in 1992. Re-elected in 1994. Retired.	1993–2003 [data missing]
Bill Jenkins (Rogersville)	Republican	January 3, 1997 – January 3, 2007	105th 106th 107th 108th 109th	Elected in 1996. Re-elected in 1998. Re-elected in 2000. Re-elected in 2002. Re-elected in 2004. Retired.	1993–2003 [data missing]
Bill Jenkins (Rogersville)	Republican	January 3, 1997 – January 3, 2007	105th 106th 107th 108th 109th	Elected in 1996. Re-elected in 1998. Re-elected in 2000. Re-elected in 2002. Re-elected in 2004. Retired.	2003–2013
David Davis (Johnson City)	Republican	January 3, 2007 – January 3, 2009	110th	Elected in 2006. Lost renomination.	2003–2013
Phil Roe (Johnson City)	Republican	January 3, 2009 – January 3, 2021	111th 112th 113th 114th 115th 116th	Elected in 2008. Re-elected in 2010. Re-elected in 2012. Re-elected in 2014. Re-elected in 2016. Re-elected in 2018. Retired.	2003–2013
Phil Roe (Johnson City)	Republican	January 3, 2009 – January 3, 2021	111th 112th 113th 114th 115th 116th	Elected in 2008. Re-elected in 2010. Re-elected in 2012. Re-elected in 2014. Re-elected in 2016. Re-elected in 2018. Retired.	2013–2023
Diana Harshbarger (Kingsport)	Republican	January 3, 2021 – present	117th 118th 119th	Elected in 2020. Re-elected in 2022. Re-elected in 2024. Re-elected in 2026.	2013–2023
Diana Harshbarger (Kingsport)	Republican	January 3, 2021 – present	117th 118th 119th	Elected in 2020. Re-elected in 2022. Re-elected in 2024. Re-elected in 2026.	2023–2027

== Recent election results ==
=== 2012 ===
Tennessee's 1st congressional district, 2012
Party	Candidate	Votes	%
Republican	Phil Roe (Incumbent)	182,252	76
Democratic	Alan Woodruff	47,663	19.9
Green	Robert N. Smith	2,872	1.2
Independent	Karen Brackett	4,837	2
Independent	Michael Salyer	2,048	0.9
Total votes		239,672	100
Republican hold			

=== 2014 ===
Tennessee's 1st congressional district, 2014
Party	Candidate	Votes	%
Republican	Phil Roe (incumbent)	115,533	82.8
Independent	Robert D. Franklin	9,906	7.1
Green	Robert N. Smith	9,869	7.1
Independent	Michael D. Salyer	4,148	3.0
Independent	Scott Kudialis (write-in)	14	0.0
Total votes		139,470	100.0
Republican hold			

=== 2016 ===
Tennessee's 1st congressional district, 2016
Party	Candidate	Votes	%
Republican	Phil Roe (incumbent)	198,293	78.4
Democratic	Alan Bohms	39,024	15.4
Independent	Robert Franklin	15,702	6.2
Independent	Paul Krane (write-in)	6	0.0
Total votes		253,025	100.0
Republican hold			

=== 2018 ===
Tennessee's 1st congressional district, 2018
Party	Candidate	Votes	%
Republican	Phil Roe (incumbent)	172,835	77.1
Democratic	Marty Olsen	47,138	21.0
Independent	Michael Salyer	4,309	1.9
Total votes		224,282	100.0
Republican hold			

=== 2020 ===
Tennessee's 1st congressional district, 2020
Party	Candidate	Votes	%
Republican	Diana Harshbarger	228,181	74.7
Democratic	Blair Walsingham	68,617	22.5
Independent	Steve Holder	8,621	2.8
Write-in		4	0.0
Total votes		305,423	100.0
Republican hold			

=== 2022 ===
Tennessee's 1st congressional district, 2022
Party	Candidate	Votes	%
Republican	Diana Harshbarger (incumbent)	147,253	78.3
Democratic	Cameron Parsons	37,032	19.7
Independent	Richard Baker	2,466	1.3
Independent	Matt Makrom	1,245	0.7
Total votes		187,996	100.0
Republican hold			

=== 2024 ===
Tennessee's 1st congressional district, 2024
Party	Candidate	Votes	%
Republican	Diana Harshbarger (incumbent)	257,825	78.08%
Democratic	Kevin Jenkins	64,021	19.39%
Independent	Richard Baker	5,714	1.73%
Independent	Levi Brake	2,639	0.80%
Total votes		330,199	100.00%
Republican hold			

== See also ==
- Tennessee's congressional districts
- List of United States congressional districts

== Sources ==
- Political Graveyard database of Tennessee congressmen
