= Thomas A. R. Nelson =

American attorney, judge, and politician (1812 – 1873)

Thomas Amos Rogers Nelson
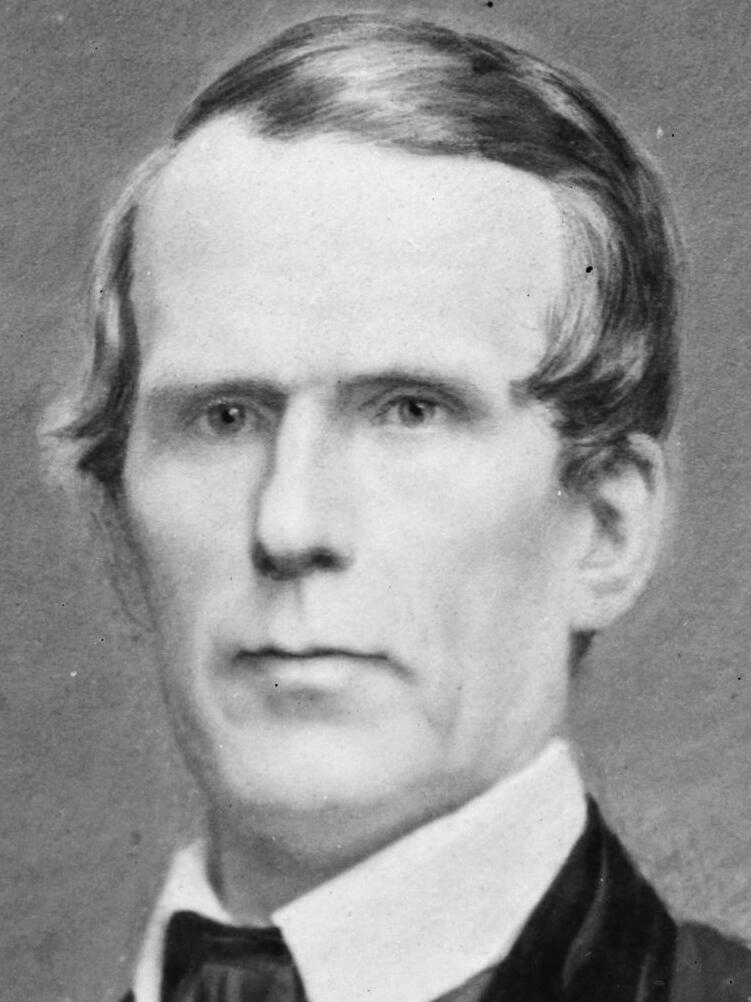

Member of the U.S. House of Representatives from Tennessee's 1st district
- In office March 4, 1859 – March 3, 1861; Prisoner of War during 37th U.S. Congress
- Preceded by: Albert Galiton Watkins
- Succeeded by: Nathaniel Green Taylor

Personal details
- Born: March 19, 1812 Roane County, Tennessee, U.S.
- Died: August 24, 1873 (aged 61) Knoxville, Tennessee, U.S.
- Resting place: Old Gray Cemetery; Knoxville, Tennessee, U.S.
- Party: Whig Party; Opposition Party; Union Party; Democratic Party
- Spouse(s): Anne Stuart; Mary Jones
- Children: 11
- Education: East Tennessee College
- Profession: Attorney, Politician, Judge

Thomas Amos Rogers Nelson (March 19, 1812 – August 24, 1873) was an American attorney, politician, and judge, active primarily in East Tennessee during the mid-19th century. He represented Tennessee's 1st congressional district in the 36th U.S. Congress (1859–1861), where he gained a reputation as a staunch pro-Union southerner. He was elected to a second term in 1861 on the eve of the Civil War but was arrested by Confederate authorities before he could take his seat.

As early as the 1830s, Nelson had gained a reputation as an effective Whig Party campaigner, but due to family considerations he did not run for office until 1859. In December of that year, Nelson gained international renown for an explosive anti-secession speech he delivered before Congress. As president of the East Tennessee Convention, Nelson campaigned to keep Tennessee in the Union but maintained a neutral position after his arrest.

After the war, Nelson opposed the radical initiatives of his long-time friend, Governor William G. Brownlow, and used his position on the state supreme court to overturn many of Brownlow's policies. Nelson served on the defense team of President Andrew Johnson during Johnson's impeachment trial in 1868 and was elected to the Tennessee Supreme Court in 1870.

== Early life ==
Nelson was born on Eskridge Farm in rural Roane County, Tennessee, the second son of farmer and land agent David Nelson and his wife, Phoebe White Nelson. In 1826 at age 14, he delivered a speech in defense of Native American rights before the First Presbyterian Church in Knoxville. He graduated from East Tennessee College (now the University of Tennessee) in 1828 and studied law in Knoxville under Thomas L. Williams. After his admission to the bar in 1832, he moved to Elizabethton to practice law.

In Elizabethton, Nelson took an active role in the promotion of Whig ideals. He was appointed acting district attorney in 1833 and campaigned on behalf of Whig presidential candidate Hugh Lawson White in 1836. Around 1839, Nelson met William G. "Parson" Brownlow and encouraged him to start a pro-Whig newspaper. In subsequent decades, this newspaper, commonly called Brownlow's Whig, grew to become one of the most influential and controversial papers in the Southern United States. Brownlow's rival, Landon Carter Haynes, read law with Nelson in the late 1830s.

Around 1840, Nelson moved his practice to Jonesborough, where he would remain for two decades. On October 29, 1840, he debated rising Democratic politician Andrew Johnson to a draw as the two campaigned for William Henry Harrison and Martin Van Buren, respectively. In 1846, Nelson successfully defended Brownlow from a libel charge in a well-publicized trial prosecuted by future Confederate judge West Humphreys.

Whig officials consistently encouraged Nelson to run for office, but Nelson always declined, stating that officeholders' salaries were inadequate to support his family. In 1851 Nelson was appointed commissioner to China but again declined the appointment due to inadequate salary. Later that year, East Tennessee representatives in the state legislature made a vigorous push to have Nelson appointed to the U.S. Senate, but the legislature chose James C. Jones instead.

== Congressional term, 1859 - 1861 ==
In 1859, Nelson ran against Haynes for Tennessee's 1st Congressional District seat. After a fierce campaign during which the candidates debate one another several dozen times, Nelson edged Haynes by a narrow margin. On December 7, in response to a series of pro-secession speeches by Southern Fire-Eaters before the House of Representatives earlier that day, Nelson delivered a powerful pro-Union speech that provoked "loud applause" from the House floor and gallery. Responding to Nelson, Virginia Congressman Roger Pryor mocked the fact that Nelson mentioned only the Union and not the Constitution, as though he adored the former more than the latter. Nelson shot back:

"If I mistake not, it is the common sentiment of the secessionists of the South, that they talk about the Constitution, but say nothing about the Union. When I talk about the Union, what do I talk about? I talk about that thing which is the result of the American Constitution."

After further debate, Pryor was visibly stumped, and Nelson was hailed as a hero by the House's pro-Union faction. The Baltimore Patriot reported that Nelson's speech "fell like a thunderbolt on the House," while the pro-Democrat Louisville Courier warned that the Fire-Eaters may have awakened "the wrong passenger." The Times (of London) called Nelson's speech "the highest product of American oratory." The secession issue dominated the remainder of Nelson's congressional term. He spoke against both abolitionism and secession and was a member of the House Committee of 33 on reconciliation.

== Civil War ==
As the secession debate reached a fevered pitch in the wake of Abraham Lincoln's election in November 1860, Nelson campaigned vigorously to keep Tennessee in the Union. On April 27, 1861, pro-Union and pro-Confederate factions held simultaneous rallies at opposite ends of Gay Street in Knoxville, and Nelson spoke alongside Andrew Johnson at the pro-Union rally. In subsequent weeks Nelson, Johnson, Brownlow and Horace Maynard canvassed East Tennessee, delivering hundreds of speeches and encouraging the region's residents to reject secession. While Tennessee voted to secede on June 8, most counties in East Tennessee remained solidly pro-Union.

On May 30, Nelson was named president of the East Tennessee Convention, which met to discuss forming a separate state in East Tennessee. At the convention's June meeting, Nelson proposed a resolution that would create such a state, and violently resist Confederate occupation, if necessary. Other delegates, led by Oliver Perry Temple and John Netherland, rejected this as too extreme and adopted a resolution petitioning the legislature for separation without threatening violent resistance. Nevertheless, the legislature rejected the petition and dispatched Confederate troops to occupy the region.

Nelson was reelected to Congress in 1861 and attempted to travel to Washington, D.C., to take his seat. While passing through Kentucky, however, he was captured by Confederate authorities and jailed in Richmond. Confederate President Jefferson Davis ordered Nelson released, however, after Nelson agreed not to oppose the Confederate government, and Nelson returned to his home in Jonesborough. He published an article in the Knoxville Register in 1862 expressing his opposition to the Emancipation Proclamation, but nevertheless followed Ambrose Burnside's Union forces to Knoxville in late 1863.

While in Knoxville, Nelson wrote several poems about his wartime experiences, one of which was published as Secession, Or Prose in Rhyme and East Tennessee, A Poem. In April 1864, at a meeting of the revived East Tennessee Convention, Nelson led a faction which called for a return to the Union, but he still rejected the abolition of slavery. This brought him into conflict with Brownlow and Maynard, who both supported Lincoln and the Emancipation Proclamation. Nelson supported George B. McClellan in the presidential election of 1864.

== Later life ==
In the late-1860s, Nelson continued to oppose the Radical Republican policies of his long-time friend Brownlow, who was now governor, and aligned himself with Johnson, now president. After the House voted to impeach Johnson in 1868, Johnson asked Nelson to join his defense team at his impeachment trial in April. For nearly two days, Nelson gave a point-by-point refutation of the impeachment charges, and the Senate voted to acquit Johnson on May 16.

Back in Tennessee, Nelson signed a petition calling on the state's judges to ignore Brownlow's attempts to disenfranchise former Confederates. Brownlow blasted most of the petition's signers but remained cordial in his disagreements with Nelson. In 1870 Nelson was elected to the Tennessee Supreme Court and helped overturn many of the decisions of his Radical Republican predecessors.

On September 27, 1871, Nelson's son David shot and killed Alabama attorney James Holt Clanton on Gay Street in Knoxville. Nelson convinced his son to surrender and posted his $25,000 bond (which was signed by Brownlow, who was now a senator). Nelson resigned his position on the state supreme court to focus on his son's trial. On May 30, 1873, David Nelson was acquitted of the charge of murder.

Nelson delivered the dedicatory address at the opening of Staub's Theatre in Knoxville on October 1, 1872, and spent his last years advising local politicians and teaching Sunday school at Knoxville's Second Presbyterian Church. He contracted cholera and died on August 24, 1873. He is interred in an unmarked grave in Old Gray Cemetery.

== Notes and references ==
U.S. House of Representatives
Preceded by Albert Galiton Watkins	Member of the U.S. House of Representatives from Tennessee's 1st congressional district March 4, 1859 – March 3, 1861	Succeeded by Nathaniel Green Taylor
