= Sam Houston Schoolhouse =

- U.S. National Register of Historic Places
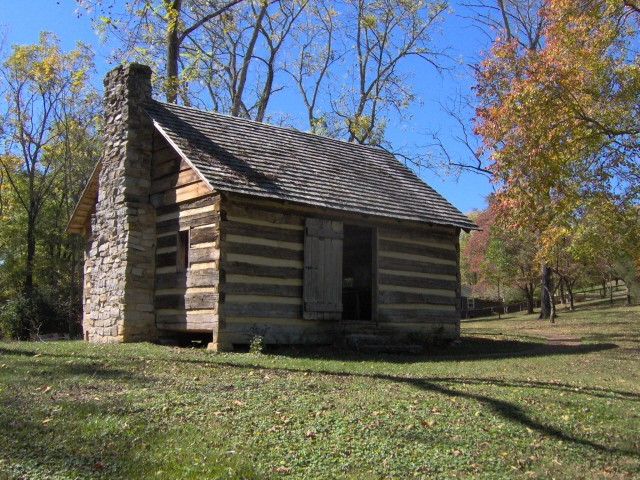
- Front of the schoolhouse

- Location within Tennessee Location within the United States
- Nearest city: Maryville, Tennessee
- Coordinates: 35°48′7″N 83°54′16″W
- Built: 1794
- NRHP reference No.: 72001228
- Added to NRHP: June 13, 1972

Sam Houston Schoolhouse State Historic Site is a single-room log cabin-style schoolhouse in Maryville, Tennessee, built in 1794. Sam Houston taught at the school as a young man, before the War of 1812.

Open to the public, the schoolhouse is a Tennessee state historic site operated under an agreement with the Tennessee Historical Commission. It was listed on the National Register of Historic Places in 1972.

The school house was originally built by a Revolutionary War veteran, Andrew Kennedy along with Henry McCulloch and other neighbors.

The National Heritage Area Program and Blount County Tennessee: A Feasibility Study says “Sometime after his arrival in Tennessee, probably in 1794, Kennedy and Henry McCulloch joined with some neighbors to construct a small log schoolhouse in a clearing less than a mile from the Kennedy home. No definitive explanation can now be given for the decision to locate the schoolhouse at the somewhat unusual site more than a half-mile from Little River. Presumably its proximity to the refreshing spring which flows nearby and perhaps its central position in relation to the original builders' homes were factors in the selection of the site.”
