= Albert Galiton Watkins =

American politician (1818–1895)

Member of the U.S. House of Representatives from Tennessee's 2nd district
- In office March 4, 1849 – March 3, 1853
- Preceded by: William M. Cocke
- Succeeded by: William Montgomery Churchwell

Member of the U.S. House of Representatives from Tennessee's 1st district
- In office March 4, 1855 – March 3, 1859
- Preceded by: Nathaniel Green Taylor
- Succeeded by: Thomas Amos Rogers Nelson

Member of the Tennessee House of Representatives
- In office 1845

Personal details
- Born: May 5, 1818 Jefferson County, Tennessee, U.S.
- Died: November 9, 1895 (aged 77) Mooresburg, Tennessee, U.S.
- Party: Whig; Democratic Party
- Education: Holston College, Tennessee
- Profession: minister lawyer

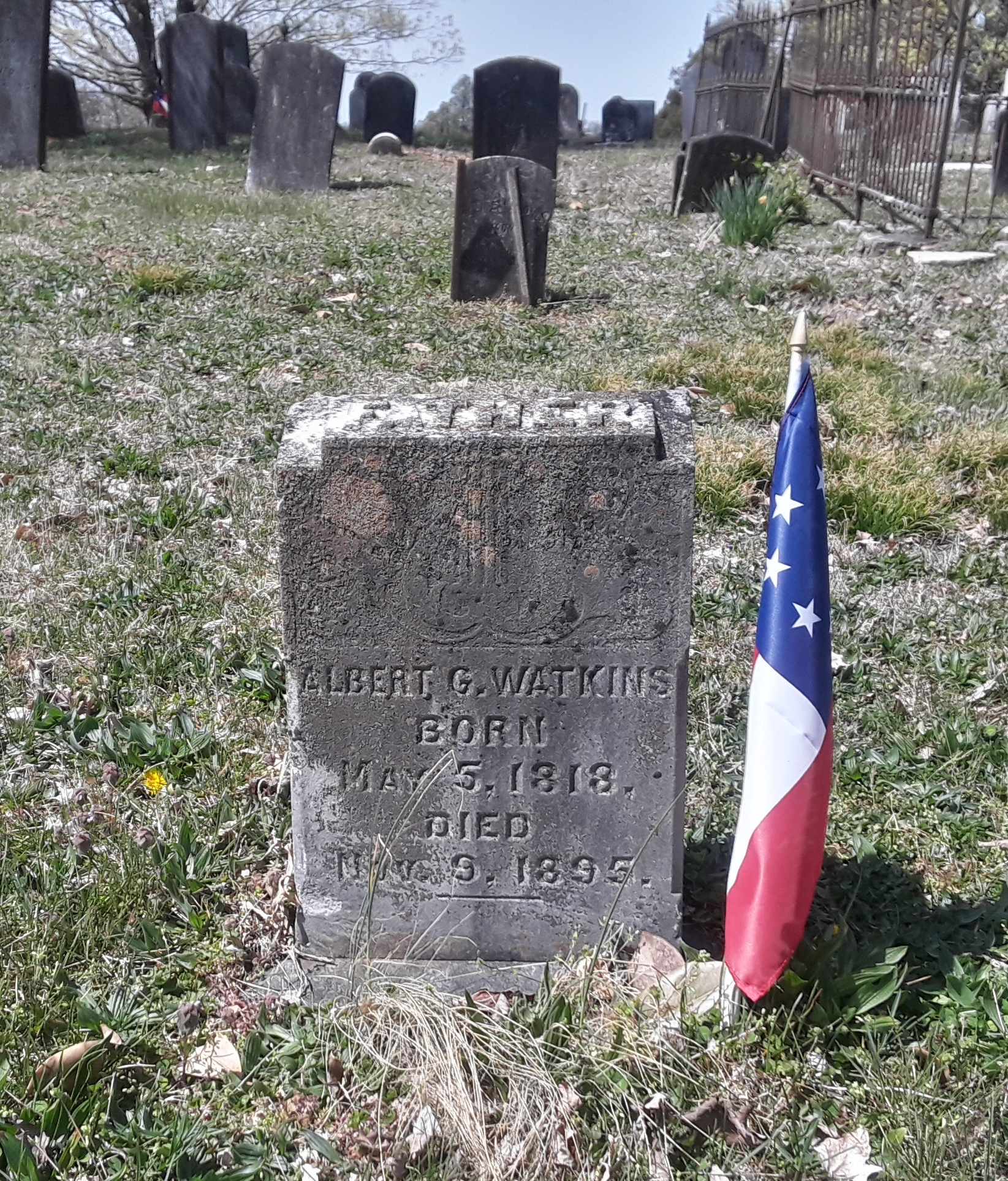
Grave marker in Westview Cemetery

Albert Galiton Watkins (May 5, 1818 – November 9, 1895) was an American politician and a member of the United States House of Representatives.

== Biography ==
Watkins was born near Jefferson City, Tennessee, on May 5, 1818. He graduated from Holston College in Tennessee and studied law. He was admitted to the bar and began private practice at Panther Springs, Tennessee, in 1839. Watkins was a slaveholder.

== Career ==
In 1845, Watkins was a member of the Tennessee House of Representatives. He was elected as a Whig to the Thirty-first and Thirty-second Congresses representing Tennessee's 2nd congressional district. He served from March 4, 1849, to March 3, 1853. He was an unsuccessful candidate for re-election in 1852 to the Thirty-third Congress.

After the districts had been reapportioned, he was elected to represent Tennessee's 1st congressional district as a member of the Democratic Party in both the Thirty-fourth and the Thirty-fifth Congresses. During that time, he served from March 4, 1855, to March 3, 1859. He was not a candidate for re-election in 1858.

== Death ==
Watkins engaged in the ministry and died in Mooresburg, Hawkins County, Tennessee, on November 9, 1895. He was interred in Westview Cemetery in Jefferson City, Tennessee.

U.S. House of Representatives
Preceded by William M. Cocke	Member of the U.S. House of Representatives from Tennessee's 2nd congressional district 1849-1853	Succeeded by William M. Churchwell
Preceded by Nathaniel G. Taylor	Member of the U.S. House of Representatives from Tennessee's 1st congressional district 1855-1859	Succeeded by Thomas A. R. Nelson
