= Sabine Hill =

Historic house in Tennessee, United States

- U.S. National Register of Historic Places
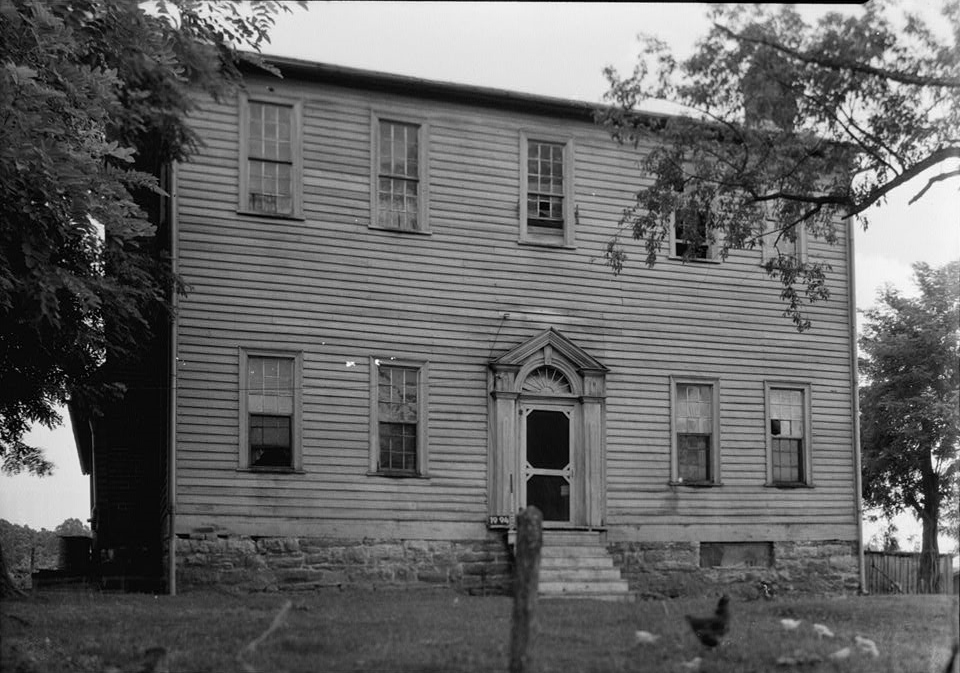
- Front of Sabine Hill in 1936

- Location within Tennessee Location within the United States
- Location: Off TN 67, Elizabethton, Tennessee
- Coordinates: 36°19′33″N 82°16′11″W
- Built: c. 1815–1820
- Architectural style: Early Republic
- NRHP reference No.: 73001755
- Added to NRHP: April 11, 1973

Sabine Hill, also known as Happy Valley, Watauga Point, and the General Nathaniel Taylor House, is a historic house in Elizabethton, Tennessee. The two-story Federal style building was listed on the National Register of Historic Places in 1973. It is an excellent example of federal architecture. It was threatened by demolition in 2007 when the owners sought to have the property rezoned for apartments. The rezoning request was denied and the home was bought by several preservation-minded locals who secured it until the State of Tennessee/Tennessee Historical Commission could purchase the museum-quality property. It is now restored and opened to the public on November 1, 2017, as a unit of Sycamore Shoals State Park. The property is operated by the Park under a memorandum of understanding with the Tennessee Historical Commission.

== Construction history ==
Brigadier General Nathaniel Taylor began building Sabine Hill between 1814 and 1816, after returning home to Elizabethton following the War of 1812. Taylor had been one of the earliest settlers in Elizabethton, having arrived as a boy around 1780 when his family migrated from Rockbridge County, Virginia to the settlement along the Watauga River. By 1796, when Carter County was formed and Tennessee became a state, Taylor owned 1,500 acres (610 ha) of land. That same year, he became the first sheriff of Carter County and one of the first officers in the new state militia. He later served in the Tennessee General Assembly. During the War of 1812 he had command of the American fortifications at the port of Mobile, Alabama. After Taylor returned from the war, he sought to build an impressive home for his family. He selected a site on a hill with a commanding view of the Happy Valley area of western Carter County.

Taylor named the house Sabine Hill, apparently in imitation of Sabine Hall, the Virginia estate of Landon Carter, and is said to have hired a Philadelphia architect to design the home. Taylor died in 1816, before the house was finished. His wife, Mary "Polly" Patton Taylor, completed the project circa 1818–20, after her husband's death. She outlived her husband by 37 years, presiding over Sabine Hill until her death in 1853.

== Description ==
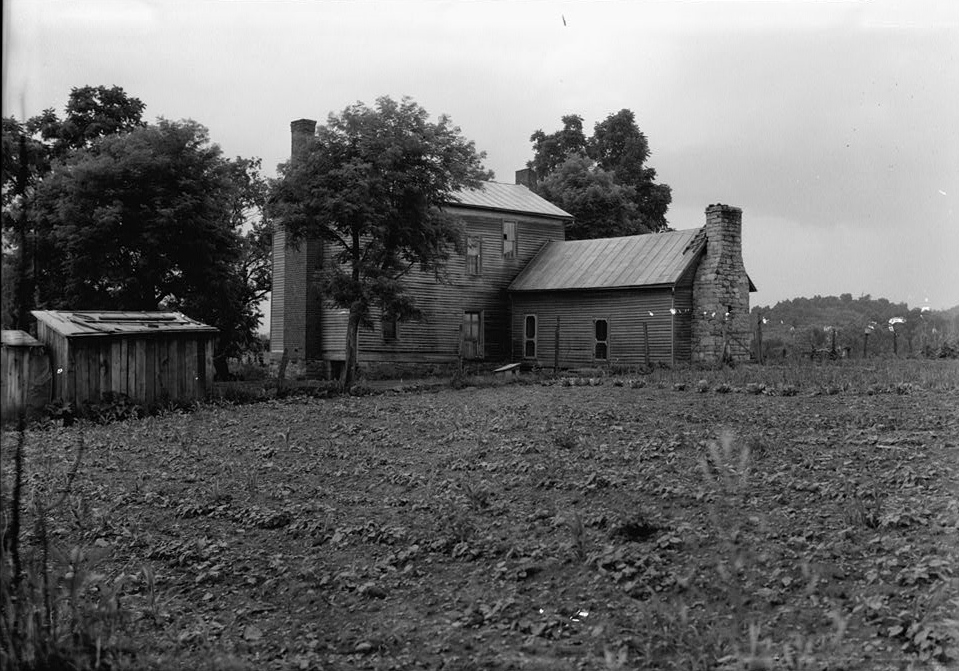
Rear view of Sabine Hill in 1936

The house is built on a two-story I-house plan with a five-bay front facade. It has a foundation of limestone quarried in the local area. The exterior walls are built from logs that are completely covered by clapboard siding. The floors are random-width pine laid over hand-hewn timber joists. There are brick chimneys on both ends of the structure. The clapboard siding, a fanlight transom over the front door, and the hand-wrought wood trim in the house's interior appear to have been added a few years after the house was built. Originally the house had a split-shingle roof, which had been replaced by galvanized iron as of 1936, when Sabine Hill was visited for the Historic American Buildings Survey (HABS). A one-story service wing extends from the rear, in an arrangement that was common at the time the house was built.

The HABS analysis observed that the interior details of the house were of particularly high quality. Noteworthy features mentioned included "delicate and almost elaborately carved" fireplace mantels and chamfered joints in the wood paneling on the walls. HABS also saw indications that Sabine Hill's design might have been influenced by architecture in Williamsburg, Virginia, particularly the design features of the Capitol Building there. One design detail noted as similar to features seen in Williamsburg was the use of "marbleized" wood for wainscoting along the stairway. The interior of Sabine Hill also reflected the patriotism of its owners; traces of the original paint indicate that the interior was painted in the colors of the U.S. flag, with white walls, red molding, and blue wainscoting.

== Later history ==
In its early decades, Sabine Hill served as both the home of the Taylor family and the headquarters of a large estate that was tended by slaves. At his death, General Nathaniel Taylor was recorded as the owner of a very large amount of land and about 20 slaves.

Although the younger members of the family had homes of their own, the Taylor family had a major presence in the Happy Valley area in the vicinity of Sabine Hill. The family grew in prominence and influence during the 19th century. Nathaniel Green Taylor, a grandson of Nathaniel and Mary Taylor, served in the U.S. House of Representatives. His sons Robert Love Taylor and Alfred A. Taylor both were later to become Governor of Tennessee, and Robert Love Taylor also served in the U.S. House and U.S. Senate.

The property remained in the Taylor family until 1947, but the family stopped living in the home some time in the 19th century. In 1892, a journalist who visited Sabine Hill found the house vacant and in a state of deterioration, although much of its decor and furnishings were intact. In 1936, HABS found the house occupied by a tenant farmer who also rented some surrounding farmland. HABS found the house to be in reasonably sound condition in spite of a lack of recent maintenance. A basement had been added some time before 1936.

In 1947 a member of the Taylor family sold the property to the Sabine Hill Realty Company with an instruction that "the old house located on this tract must either be razed or remodeled." The property was sold again in 1948 and 1949. James L. Reynolds, who acquired it in 1949, was interested in preserving the house. During his ownership, which continued until 1999, many repairs and alterations were made, including foundation and chimney repairs, installation of new window sashes, and addition of a porch. Reynolds replaced much of the clapboard siding and flipped and sanded many pieces of siding. The house was also equipped with modern kitchen and bathroom fixtures. In 1973, during the Reynolds ownership, Sabine Hill was listed on the National Register of Historic Places.

After Reynolds' death, his heirs decided to sell the property. After officials of the city of Elizabethton were unsuccessful in an effort to acquire it in order to preserve it, in 2003 it was sold to a couple from Johnson City who hoped to renovate the house and make it into a historic site attraction. They were unable to achieve their goals, and the property was optioned to a developer who wanted to demolish the house and build condominiums on the 4.8-acre (1.9 ha) site.

== Preservation ==
Sabine Hill was saved from demolition by a group of locals who bought it and held it until it could be purchased by the Tennessee Historical Commission in 2007. The restoration was undertaken by the Tennessee Historical Commission and it is operated as a unit of Sycamore Shoals State Park. It is an excellent example of federal-style architecture.
