= Tennessee Historical Commission =

State Historic Preservation Office for the U.S. state of Tennessee

The Tennessee Historical Commission (THC) is the State Historic Preservation Office for the U.S. state of Tennessee. Headquartered in Nashville, it is an independent state agency, administratively attached to the Department of Environment and Conservation. Its mission is to protect, preserve, interpret, maintain, and administer historic places; to encourage the inclusive diverse study of Tennessee's history for the benefit of future generations; to mark important locations, persons, and events in Tennessee history; to assist in worthy publication projects; to review, comment on and identify projects that will potentially impact historic properties; to locate, identify, record, and nominate to the National Register of Historic Places all properties which meet National Register criteria, and to implement other programs of the National Historic Preservation Act of 1966 as amended. The Tennessee Historical Commission also refers to the entity consisting of 15 appointed members and five ex officio members.

== History ==
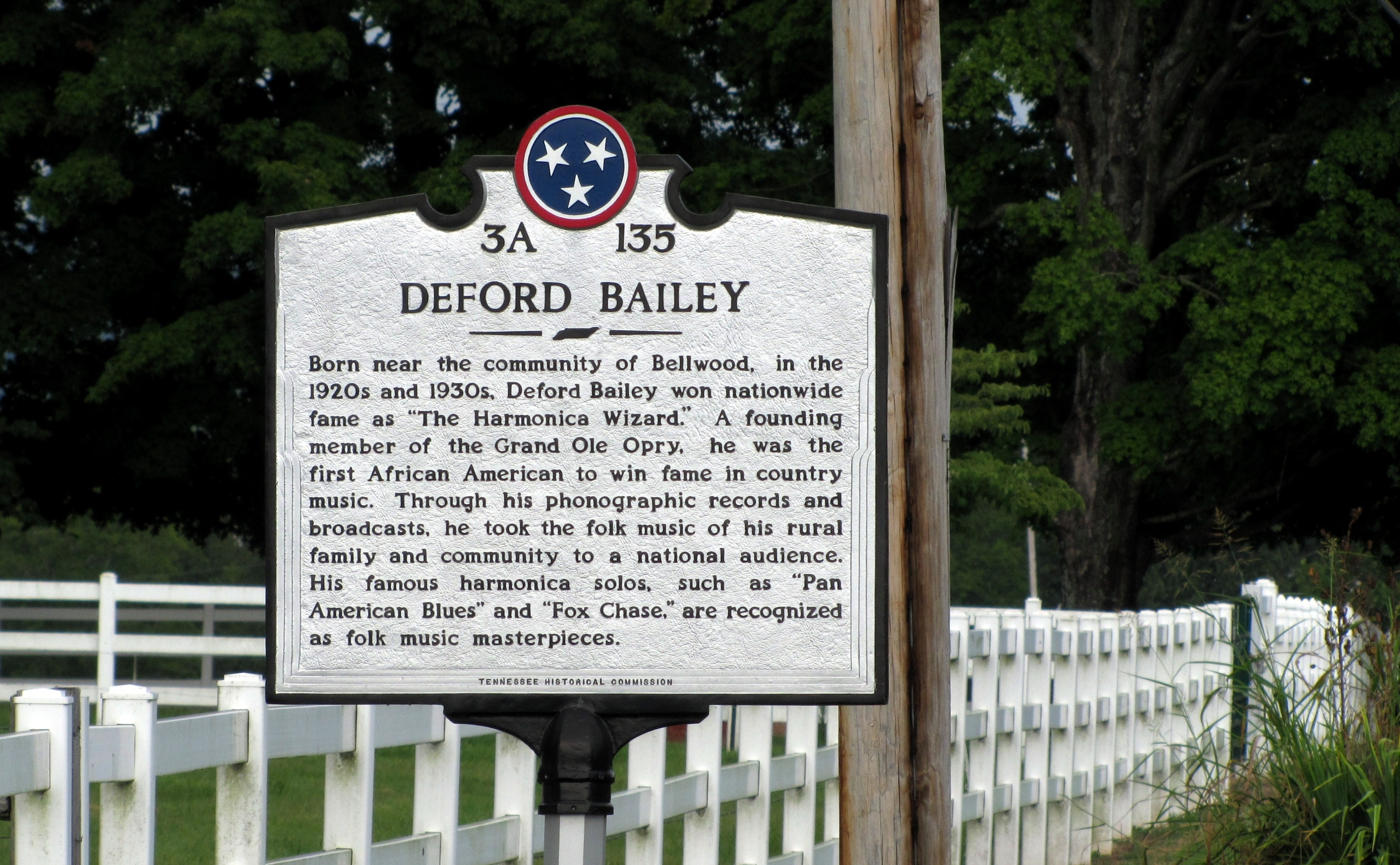
Tennessee Historical Commission marker

The Commission was established as the "Tennessee Historical Committee" on January 23, 1919. Its initial purpose was to memorialize events pertaining to World War I. In 1921 an amendment to the Act that created the Committee expanded its duties toward its modern mission, designating that the Committee could "care for the proper marking and preservation of battlefields, houses, and other places celebrated in the history of the state." After a decade of inactivity following the death of its first Chairman John Trotwood Moore in 1929, it was re-energized in 1940 by Governor Prentice Cooper. A partnership with the Tennessee Historical Society began in 1942 to produce the Tennessee Historical Quarterly, which is still published today. In 1951 the historic marker program was founded. Since then, approximately 2,000 markers have been erected across the state. Following the passage of the National Historic Preservation Act of 1966, the Commission was designated as the State Historic Preservation Office (SHPO). There are 20 Commission members, consisting of five members appointed by the Governor, five appointed by the Lieutenant Governor, five by the House Speaker and five ex officio members, including the Governor, State Archaeologist, State Librarian, State Historian, and the Commissioner of Environment and Conservation. The Board meets three times a year, usually the third Friday of February, June, and October. As of 2025 the Commission has a professional staff of 20. The staff administers the Federal programs including the National Register of Historic Places, Section 106 review, the Certified Local Government Program, survey, and historic tax credits. State programs include historic markers, state-owned historic sites, cemetery preservation, and the Tennessee Wars Commission.

Since 1994 the Commission's offices have been located in Clover Bottom Mansion, an 1850s-era National Register-listed Italianate-style house in the Donelson area of Nashville, Tennessee. This historic property had been unused for over a decade when it was restored for use by the Commission. The historic outbuildings, including two former c. 1858 two slave cabins, a c. 1850s carriage house, and an 1890s horse barn were restored in 2015-16. Over 150 native species trees were planted, and a walking trail was added. The grounds are open to the public during daylight hours, but there are currently no tours of the house (which does not contain period furnishings or exhibits.)

== Chairmen and Executive Staff ==
Seventeen individuals have served as Chairman of the Tennessee Historical Commission. For many years, the Director of the Tennessee State Library and Archives was also by virtue of the position the Chairman of the Commission. The names and terms of the chairmen are as follows: John Trotwood Moore (Nashville) c. 1919-1929; Judge Samuel Cole Williams, (Johnson City) 1940-1946; William E. Beard (Nashville) 1946-1950; Dan M. Robison, (Nashville) 1950-1961; Dr. William T. Alderson, (Nashville) 1961-1964; Sam B. Smith, (Nashville) 1964-1969; Robert A. McGaw (Nashville) 1969-1975; Judge Harry Wellford,(Memphis) 1975-1977; Richard W. Weesner (Nashville) 1977-1981; Walter T. Durham, (Gallatin) 1981-1985; Russell Hippe, (Nashville) 1985-1990; Robert Corlew (Murfreesboro) 1990-1997; Ward DeWitt, Jr. (Nashville) 1997-2003; Norman Hill (Murfreesboro) 2003-2009; Sam D. Elliott (Signal Mountain) 2009-2015; Dr. Reavis L. Mitchell, Jr. (Nashville) 2015–2020; Derita Coleman Williams (Memphis) 2020-2024; Sam D. Elliott (Signal Mountain) 2025-present.

Since 1942, ten individuals have served as the primary staff person for the Commission. Since the passage of the National Historic Preservation Act in 1966, the Commission’s directors have served as Tennessee's State Historic Preservation Officer or as the Deputy State Historic Preservation Officer. Stephen Lawrence was hired in 1967 and was the first employee of the Commission to hold the title of executive director. Herbert L. Harper joined the staff of the Commission in 1969 as Field Services Representative and served from 1975 to 2006 as the executive director. The executive staff and their tenures are as follows: Rebecca W. DeWitt, 1942-1956, Secretary; Dr. William T. Alderson, 1956-1961, Executive Secretary; H. Glyn Thomas, 1962-1963, Executive Secretary; James W. Moody, Jr., 1963-1967, Executive Secretary; Stephen Lawrence, 1967-1971, Executive Secretary/ Executive Director; Dr. Michael J. Smith 1971-1973, Executive Director; Herbert L. Harper, Interim Executive Director, 1973-1974; Lawrence C. Henry, 1974-1975, Executive Director; Herbert L. Harper, Executive Director 1975-2006; Richard G. Tune, Interim Executive Director, 2006-2007; E. Patrick McIntyre, Jr., Executive Director, 2007–2025; Miranda Montgomery, Interim Executive Director, 2025-2026; Miranda Montgomery, Executive Director, 2026-present.

== State-Owned Historic Sites Program ==
The Tennessee Historical Commission has 17 State Historic Sites under its administration. While THC provides operating grants and pays for major maintenance projects, each of the sites except for Sabine Hill are administered by independent, 501 (c) 3 non-profits who are responsible for staffing and raising most of the funds to operate the properties. Four sites are in Castalian Springs, a small Sumner County community that has been referred to as the "Cradle of Tennessee History" for its importance. Sabine Hill in Elizabethton and Hawthorn Hill in Castalian Springs are the newest state historic sites, and both opened in 2017. Sabine Hilli is a unit of Sycamore Shoals State Historic Park. THC State-owned Historic Sites include:

East Tennessee Burra Burra Mine State Historic Site, Ducktown; Chester Inn State Historic Site, Jonesborough; Rocky Mount State Historic Site, Piney Flats; Marble Springs State Historic Site, Knoxville; Sabine Hill, Elizabethton; Sam Houston Schoolhouse State Historic Site, Maryville; Tipton-Haynes State Historic Site, Johnson City;

Middle Tennessee Carter House State Historic Site, Franklin; Castalian Springs Mound Site, Castalian Springs; Cragfont State Historic Site, Castalian Springs; Hawthorn Hill State Historic Site, Castalian Springs; Hotel Halbrook State Historic Site, Dickson; Rock Castle State Historic Site, Hendersonville; Sam Davis Shrine, Pulaski; Sparta Rock House State Historic Site, Sparta; Wynnewood State Historic Site, Castalian Springs

West Tennessee Alex Haley Home State Historic Site, Henning

== The Tennessee Wars Commission ==
The Tennessee Wars Commission (TWC) was established in 1994 to preserve sites associated with military heritage from the Period of the French and Indian War to the Civil War. Since then, the Wars Commission has helped protect over 7000 acres in Tennessee. Three individuals have served as program director since that time, including Fred Prouty, who served from 1994 until 2016. Ms. Nina L. Scall is the first female program director and has been serving in this capacity since 2019. During her time with the Wars Commission, she has strengthened the conservation easement program and expanded the grants programs. Most of the protected properties are Civil War sites, such as Parkers Crossroads Battlefield and Davis Bridge Battlefield. A significant property, Camp Blount in Fayetteville, was also saved under the lead efforts of the Tennessee Wars Commission and was the only War of 1812-era site preserved as part of the National Bicentennial commemoration of that conflict. The Wars Commission has a grant program that has provided over $2 million in funding since its inception. The Civil Wars Sites Preservation Grant Fund allocates funds for the preservation of the 38 most important Civil War sites as identified by the National Park Service's report and Underground Railroad sites eligible for listing on the National Register or eligible for National Landmark status. The Wars Commission Grant Fund allocates funds for historic preservation projects focused on the French and Indian War through the Civil War.

== See also ==
- Tennessee Heritage Protection Act
- List of historical societies in Tennessee
