= Roderick R. Butler =

American politician (1827–1902)

Roderick Butler
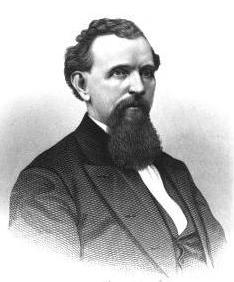

Member of the U.S. House of Representatives from Tennessee's 1st district
- In office March 4, 1887 – March 3, 1889
- Preceded by: Augustus Pettibone
- Succeeded by: Alfred A. Taylor
- In office March 4, 1867 – March 3, 1875
- Preceded by: Nathaniel Taylor
- Succeeded by: William McFarland

Member of the Tennessee Senate
- In office 1893–1901

Member of the Tennessee House of Representatives
- In office 1879–1885
- In office 1859–1862

Personal details
- Born: Roderick Randum Butler; April 9, 1827 Wytheville, Virginia, U.S.
- Died: August 18, 1902 (aged 75) Mountain City, Tennessee, U.S.
- Party: Whig (before 1854); Republican (1854–1902)
- Spouse: Emeline Donnelly Butler
- Children: 11

Military service
- Allegiance: United States • Union
- Branch/service: United States Army • Union Army
- Years of service: 1863–1864
- Rank: Lieutenant Colonel
- Unit: 13th Tennessee Cavalry Regiment

Roderick Randum Butler (April 9, 1827 – August 18, 1902) was an American politician who represented Tennessee's 1st district in the United States House of Representatives from 1867 to 1875, and again from 1887 to 1889. He also served several terms in the Tennessee state legislature, and briefly served as a state court judge. An opponent of secession, Butler represented Johnson County at the East Tennessee Convention in 1861, and afterward joined the Union Army. Butler was censured by the House of Representatives in March 1870 for receiving payment in return for recommending someone for admission to the U.S. Naval Academy.

== Early life ==
Butler was born in Wytheville, Virginia, on April 9, 1827, the youngest son of George Butler. His father died before Roderick was one year old. At age 13, he was bound out as an apprentice to John Haney of Newbern, Virginia, to learn the tailor's trade. After a six-year apprenticeship, he moved to Taylorsville, Tennessee (modern Mountain City) to work as a tailor.

At the age of 21, Butler began reading law with Carter County attorney Carrick W. Nelson. He was admitted to the bar in 1853, and practiced in Johnson County and Carter County in partnership with Nelson until the outbreak of the Civil War.

At a young age, Butler aligned himself with the Whig Party. He was appointed postmaster of Taylorsville by President Millard Fillmore, and was elected to a county judgeship in 1855. He was also a major of the First Battalion of the Tennessee Militia, having been elected to the rank around 1850.

== Civil War ==
Butler was elected to the Tennessee House of Representatives in 1859, representing Johnson and Carter counties, and was reelected in 1861. He was one of fifteen legislators to vote against the state's military alignment with the Confederate States of America in May 1861. He was a member of the Johnson County delegation at both the Knoxville session (May 30–31) and Greeneville session (June 17–20) of the East Tennessee Convention, which petitioned the state legislature to allow East Tennessee to break away from Tennessee and form a Union-aligned state.

Described by fellow Unionist Oliver Perry Temple as "unshrinking" and "outspoken," Butler was arrested by Confederate authorities and charged with treason in 1862, but was acquitted due to lack of witnesses. He was arrested on a similar charge a short while later, but was released with the help of friends, and fled to Kentucky. He was authorized by General Ambrose Burnside to raise a Union Army regiment, but this new regiment was consolidated with the 13th Regiment Tennessee Volunteer Cavalry under Colonel John K. Miller in late 1863. Butler received the rank of lieutenant colonel, and served until 1864, when he resigned for health reasons.

Butler was a delegate to the Republican National Conventions in 1864, 1872 and 1876. In 1865, he was a delegate to the Tennessee state constitutional convention. That same year, he was elected to the Tennessee Senate, but resigned to accept an appointment by Governor William G. Brownlow as judge of the state's First Judicial Circuit Court. He was chairman of the first state Republican executive committee of Tennessee. He was also a delegate to the Baltimore Border State Convention in 1867.

== Postwar political endeavors ==
In 1867, Butler was elected as a Republican to the Fortieth United States Congress, winning over 86% of the vote in a race against Democrat James White. He ran virtually unopposed in 1868. He was censured by the House of Representatives on March 17, 1870, for accepting payment in return for recommending the appointment of a cadet to West Point (a vote to expel failed). He was narrowly reelected later that year in a three-way race against White and former congressman Nathaniel Green Taylor. Though the state legislature gerrymandered his district, he was nevertheless reelected to a fourth term in 1872, winning 56% of the vote in a race against William B. Carter, the leader of the East Tennessee bridge-burning conspiracy. He was finally defeated for reelection in 1874, garnering just 44% of the vote against the Democratic candidate, William McFarland.

During the 40th Congress (1867–1869), Butler served on the Committee on the Revision of Laws (now part of the Judiciary Committee). During the 41st Congress, he served on the Committee on Elections and the Committee on Revolutionary Pensions. For the 42nd Congress, he was a member of the Committee on Freedmen's Affairs, and for the 43rd Congress, he was a member of the Committee on Indian Affairs.

In 1878, Butler was elected to the Tennessee House of Representatives, where he would serve until 1885. In 1887, Butler was again elected to Congress, defeating his old opponent, James White, with about 60% of the vote. In 1887, he failed to win his party's nomination for reelection, but ran in the general election as an Independent Republican. He was narrowly defeated by rising politician Alfred A. Taylor. In 1893, he was elected to the Tennessee Senate, where he served until 1901.

In a letter to editor William S. Speer, who was compiling information for his book, Sketches of Prominent Tennesseans, Butler stated:

If my time were to go over, I would attend to my profession and nothing else; I would never go into politics; there is no money in it, it is a dog's life; the politician is a pack-horse for everybody, has to go everybody's security and neglect one's private affairs.

Butler died in Mountain City, Tennessee, on August 18, 1902 (age 75 years, 131 days). He is interred at Mountain View Cemetery in Mountain City.

== Family and legacy ==
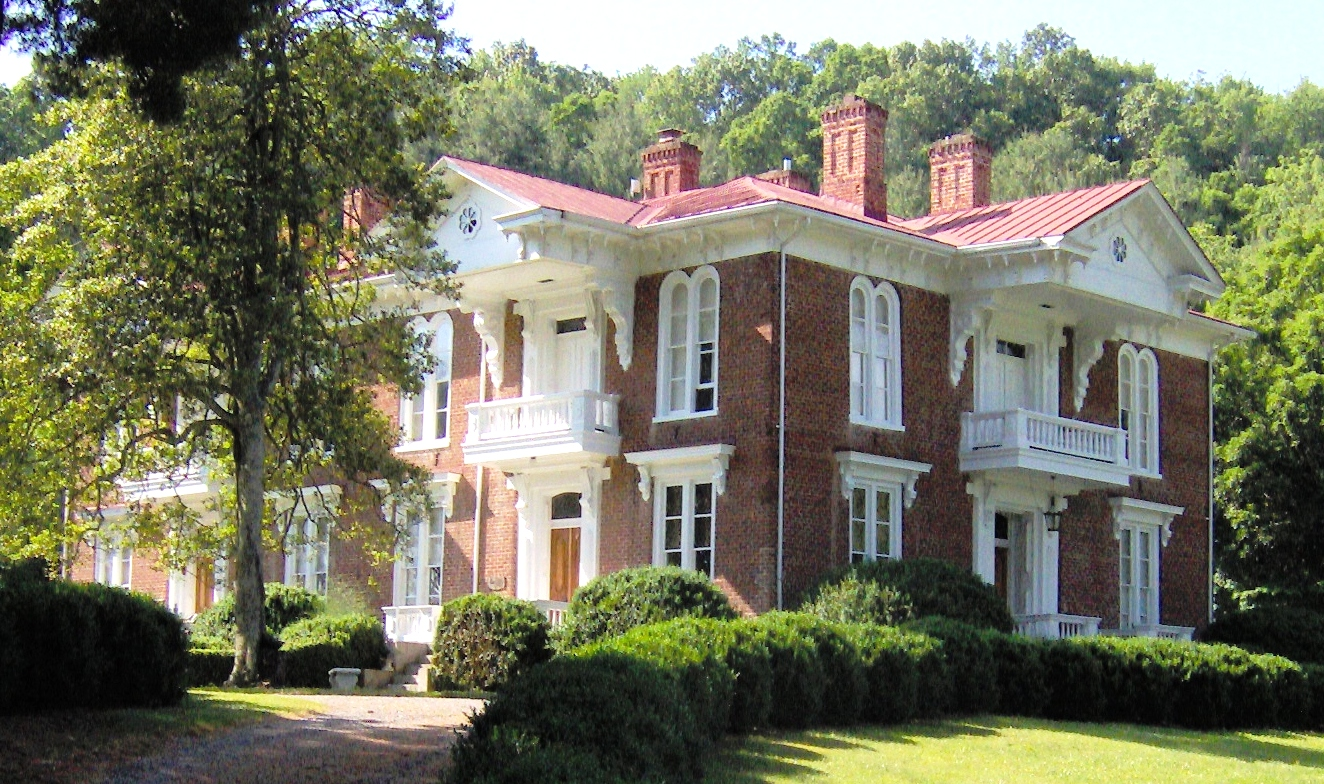
Roderick Butler's mansion in Mountain City, Tennessee

Butler married Emeline Jane Donnelly, the daughter of a wealthy Taylorsville area farmer, in 1849. The couple had 11 children. A grandson of Butler, Robert Reyburn Butler, represented an Oregon district in the U.S. House of Representatives from 1928 to 1933.

His private residence in Mountain City, the Butler House, is listed on the National Register of Historic Places. After the Civil War, the Johnson County community of Smith's Mill was renamed Butler in his honor.

== See also ==
- List of United States representatives expelled, censured, or reprimanded

U.S. House of Representatives
Preceded by Nathaniel G. Taylor	Member of the U.S. House of Representatives from Tennessee's 1st congressional district 1867–1875	Succeeded by William McFarland
Preceded by Augustus H. Pettibone	Member of the U.S. House of Representatives from Tennessee's 1st congressional district 1887–1889	Succeeded by Alfred A. Taylor
