= Sam R. Sells =

American politician

Sam Riley Sells
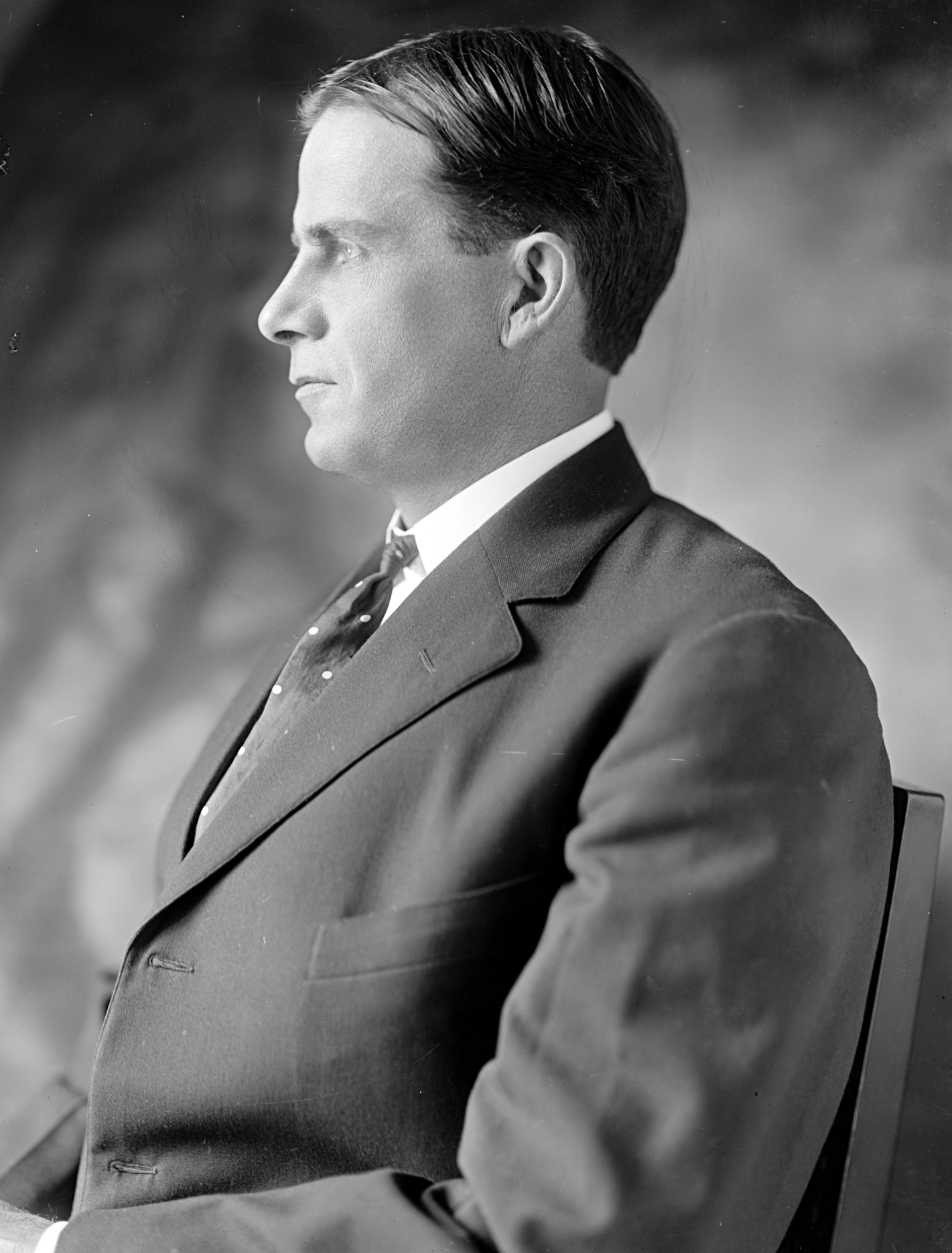
- Harris & Ewing Collection, Library of Congress

Member of the U.S. House of Representatives from Tennessee's 1st district
- In office March 4, 1911 – March 3, 1921
- Preceded by: Zachary D. Massey
- Succeeded by: B. Carroll Reece

Personal details
- Born: Samuel Riley Sells; August 2, 1871 Bristol, Tennessee, United States
- Died: November 2, 1935 (aged 64) Johnson City, Tennessee
- Party: Republican
- Spouse: Frances Rice Hayward Sells
- Children: Samuel Hayward Sells; Charlotte Wyman Sells; Lucy McGuire Sells; Frank Hayward Sells
- Education: King College, Bristol, Tennessee
- Profession: Attorney

Military service
- Allegiance: United States of America
- Branch/service: United States Army
- Rank: Private
- Unit: Company F, Third Regiment, Tennessee Volunteer Infantry
- Battles/wars: Spanish–American War

Samuel Riley Sells (August 2, 1871 – November 2, 1935) was an American politician and a member of the United States House of Representatives for the 1st congressional district of Tennessee.

== Biography ==
Sells was born on August 2, 1871, in Bristol, Tennessee, in Sullivan County son of George Washington and Mary Margaret McCrary. He attended the rural schools and King College in Bristol, Tennessee from 1885 to 1890. He studied law, was admitted to the bar, and commenced practice in Blountville, Tennessee. He served as a private in Company F, Third Regiment, Tennessee Volunteer Infantry during the Spanish–American War. He married Frances Rice Hayward on April 25, 1904, and they had four children, Samuel Hayward, Charlotte Wyman, Lucy McGuire, and Frank Hayward.

== Career ==
After moving to Johnson City, Tennessee, Sells engaged in the lumber business. He served as a member of the Tennessee Senate from 1909 to 1911.

Sells was elected as a Republican to the Sixty-second and to the four succeeding Congresses. He served from March 4, 1911, to March 3, 1921, and was an unsuccessful candidate for renomination in 1920. During the Sixty-sixth Congress, he was the chairman of the United States House Committee on Pensions. He was a delegate to the Republican National Convention in 1912, 1916 and 1932.

Resuming the lumber business in Johnson City, Tennessee, Sells also engaged in the manufacturing of shale brick and in numerous other enterprises.

== Death ==
Sells died in Johnson City, Tennessee, on November 2, 1935 (age 64 years, 92 days). He is interred at Oak Hill Cemetery in Johnson City.

U.S. House of Representatives
Preceded by Zachary D. Massey	Member of the U.S. House of Representatives from Tennessee's 1st congressional district 1911–1921	Succeeded by B. Carroll Reece
