= Herald & Tribune =

Newspaper serving Jonesborough, Tennessee, U.S.

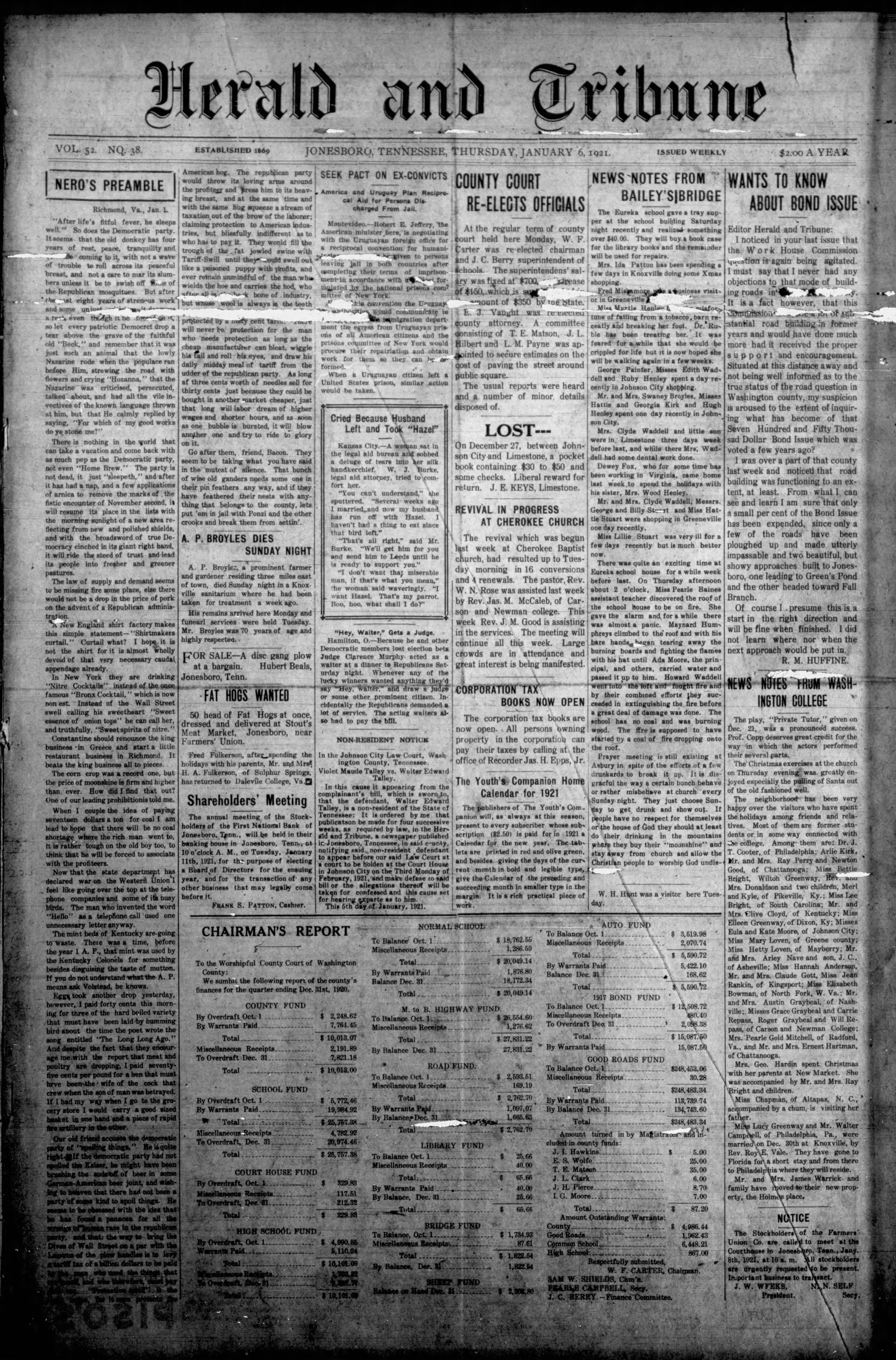
- The front page of the Herald & Tribune in January 1921
- Type: Weekly newspaper
- Owner: Six Rivers Media
- Founded: August 26, 1869
- Ceased publication: August 13, 2025
- Headquarters: 702 W. Jackson Blvd, Jonesborough, TN
- Website: heraldandtribune.com

The Herald & Tribune is a paper serving Jonesborough, Tennessee. It is owned by the Sandusky Corporation, which runs a number of local papers and radio stations.

== History ==
The newspaper was established on August 26, 1869 as a four-page weekly. The first issue went to press under the direction of Dr. C. Wheeler and Dr. M. S. Mahoney, the original publishers. Initially a Republican paper, it promised to "condemn wrong and expose fraud by whom-so-ever committed." D.C. Stephenson, former Grand Dragon of the Indiana branch of the Ku Klux Klan and convicted rapist and murderer, was hired to write for the newspaper in 1961 after being asked to leave Indiana and never return as a part of his parole. The newspaper announced it will cease on Aug. 13, 2025. It will be absorbed into the Johnson City Press.
