= A. H. Pettibone =

American politician (1835–1918)

Augustus Herman Pettibone
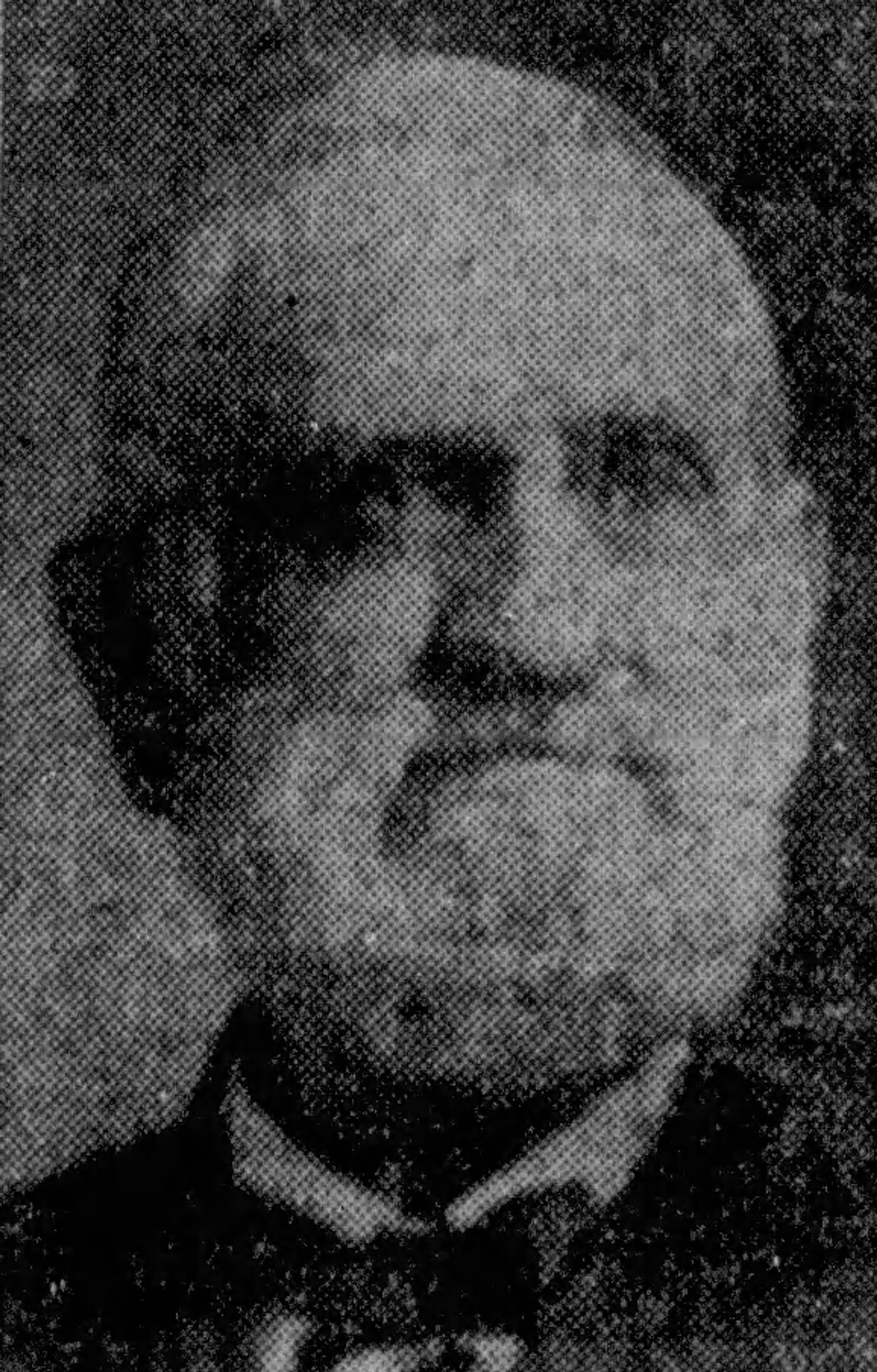

Member of the U.S. House of Representatives from Tennessee's 1st district
- In office March 4, 1881 – March 3, 1887
- Preceded by: Robert L. Taylor
- Succeeded by: Roderick R. Butler

Member of the Tennessee House of Representatives
- In office 1897–1899

Personal details
- Born: January 21, 1835 Bedford, Ohio
- Died: November 26, 1918 (aged 83) Nashville, Tennessee
- Party: Republican
- Spouse(s): Mary C. Speck Pettibone, Sara Bradford Young Pettibone, Serafina Deery M. Trigg Pettibone
- Education: Hiram College; University of Michigan
- Profession: Attorney

Augustus Herman Pettibone (January 21, 1835 – November 26, 1918) was an American politician and a member of the United States House of Representatives for the 1st congressional district of Tennessee.

== Biography ==
Pettibone was born in Bedford, Ohio, in Cuyahoga County, Ohio, son of Augustus N. and Nancy L. (Hathaway) Pettibone. He graduated from Hiram College in Ohio and then from the University of Michigan at Ann Arbor in 1859. He studied law, with the Hon. Jonathan E. Arnold, at Milwaukee, Wisconsin, and was admitted to the bar in 1860. He then commenced practice in La Crosse, Wisconsin. He was married three times. On July 16, 1868, he married Mary C. Speck, of Rogersville, Tennessee, daughter of George C. Speck. His second wife was Sara Bradford Young, and his third wife was Serafina Deery M. Trigg.

== Career ==
During the American Civil War, Pettibone enlisted as a private in the Union Army in 1861 and was promoted to second lieutenant, captain, and major in the 20th Wisconsin Volunteer Infantry Regiment.

Pettibone continued the practice of law in Greeneville, Tennessee, in 1865. He served as an alderman of Greenville from 1866 to 1868. He was an attorney general for the first judicial circuit of Tennessee in 1869 and 1870. He was appointed an assistant United States district attorney for the eastern district of Tennessee on December 27, 1871, serving until 1880. He was an unsuccessful candidate for election in 1878 to the Forty-sixth Congress. He was a delegate to the Republican National Convention in 1880.

Elected as a Republican to the Forty-seventh, Forty-eighth, and Forty-ninth Congresses, Pettibone served from March 4, 1881, to March 3, 1887. He was not a candidate for renomination in 1886, but resumed the practice of law and served in the Tennessee House of Representatives from 1897 to 1899. He was appointed a special agent of the United States General Land Office and served from July 17, 1899, to January 31, 1905, when he resigned.

== Death ==
Pettibone died in Nashville, Tennessee, and is interred in Nashville National Cemetery in Madison, Tennessee, in Davidson County, Tennessee.

U.S. House of Representatives
Preceded by Robert L. Taylor	Member of the U.S. House of Representatives from Tennessee's 1st congressional district 1881–1887	Succeeded by Roderick R. Butler
