= Happy Valley, Carter County, Tennessee =

Coordinates: 36.3423°N 82.2459°W

Happy Valley is an area in the city of Elizabethton, Tennessee and adjacent unincorporated Carter County, located on the west side of Elizabethton.

Nathaniel Green Taylor was the first postmaster of Happy Valley, which had a post office from 1850 until 1900. The region has a historical association with the Taylor family estate, Sabine Hill.

The Carter County Board of Education operates three schools in Happy Valley: Happy Valley Elementary School, Happy Valley Middle School, and Happy Valley High School.
