= Senator Worley =

Senator Worley may refer to:

- Anna Lee Keys Worley (1876–1961), Tennessee State Senate
- Ed Worley (born 1956), Kentucky State Senate
- J. Parks Worley (1873–1921), Tennessee State Senate
- William G. Worley (fl. 1890s), West Virginia State Senate
