= 1908 Tennessee gubernatorial election =

- November 3, 1908
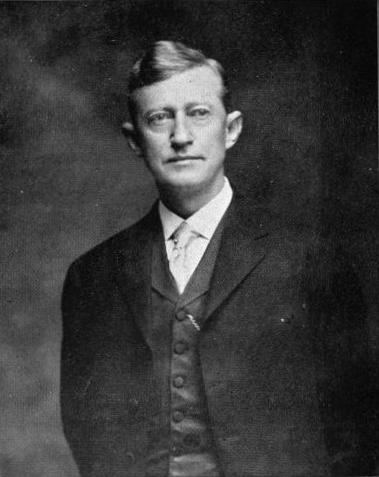

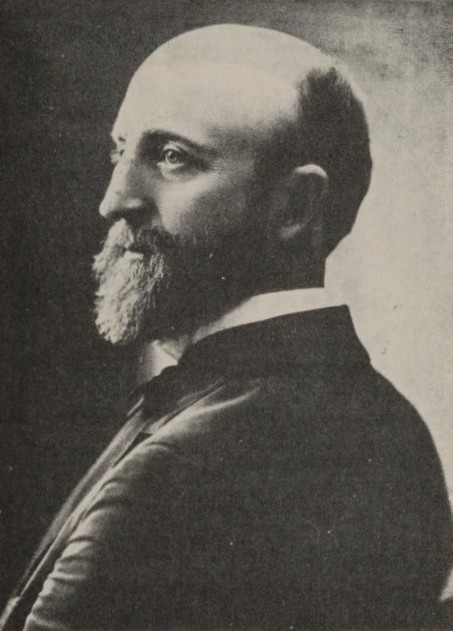
Nominee	Malcolm R. Patterson	George N. Tillman
Party	Democratic	Republican
Popular vote	133,176	113,269
Percentage	53.73%	45.70%
- County results Patterson: 50–60% 60–70% 70–80% 80–90% >90% Tillman: 50–60% 60–70% 70–80% 80–90% >90%
Governor before election
Malcolm R. Patterson
Democratic
Elected Governor
Malcolm R. Patterson
Democratic

The 1908 Tennessee gubernatorial election was held on November 3, 1908. Incumbent Democratic governor Malcolm R. Patterson defeated Republican nominee G. N. Tillman with 53.73% of the vote.

During Patterson's term as governor, he created a State Highway Commission, signed legislation that banned gambling on horse races, and enacted food and drug regulations. Patterson was the first governor to occupy a governor's mansion (previous governors had lived in hotel rooms), which was purchased by the state, and occupied by successive governors until 1922, when a new residence was built. At the beginning of his second term in 1909, he signed the General Education Act, which created four colleges: East Tennessee State University, Middle Tennessee State University, the University of Memphis, and Tennessee State University.

== Background ==
During the governor race, Edward W. Carmack, who had lost his Senate seat to Robert Love Taylor two years earlier, challenged Patterson for the nomination. Carmack ran a strong campaign, but Patterson managed to clinch the nomination with just over 50% of the delegates. The Republican Party, which was embroiled in a power struggle between Walter P. Brownlow and Newell Sanders, initially nominated two candidates, T. Asbury Wright (Brownlow's candidate) and George Tillman (Sanders's candidate), but Wright eventually withdrew.

In October 1908, a feud between the West Tennessee Land Company and Obion County residents over control of Reelfoot Lake resulted in two of the company's officers, Quentin Rankin and Robert Z. Taylor, being kidnapped by a vigilante group known as the Night Riders. Rankin was murdered by the group, though Taylor managed to escape. Patterson personally led the state guard into Obion County, where they rounded up and incarcerated dozens of Night Riders (several would later be put on trial). This action boosted his popularity, and he defeated Tillman on election day in November, 133,176 votes to 113,269.

Shortly after the election, Patterson became involved in a scandal that would eventually end his political career. Carmack, his former opponent, had published an article ruthlessly mocking Patterson's advisor, Colonel Duncan Cooper. On November 8, 1908, Cooper and his son, Robin, encountered Carmack in the street. Gunfire erupted between Carmack and Robin Cooper, resulting in Carmack being shot and killed. Carmack's supporters blamed Patterson for the shooting, and at one point sought his impeachment. Both Coopers were convicted of murder, though the elder Cooper was pardoned by Patterson in 1910, leading to widespread outrage. Patterson, who had issued more than 1,400 pardons during his tenure, had previously been accused of abusing the pardon power to free corrupt political allies.

== General election ==
=== Candidates ===
Major party candidates

- Malcolm R. Patterson, Democratic
- G. N. Tillman, Republican

Other candidates

- W.A. Weatherall, Socialist

=== Results ===
1908 Tennessee gubernatorial election
Party	Candidate	Votes	%	±%
Democratic	Malcolm R. Patterson (incumbent)	133,176	53.73%	
Republican	George N. Tillman	113,269	45.70%	
Socialist	W. A. Weatherall	1,422	0.57%	
Majority		19,907		
Turnout				
Democratic hold		Swing		

== See also ==
- 1908 United States presidential election in Tennessee
