= Zachary Taylor (Tennessee politician) =

American politician

Member of the U.S. House of Representatives from Tennessee's 10th district
- In office March 4, 1885 – March 3, 1887
- Preceded by: H. Casey Young
- Succeeded by: James Phelan, Jr.

Member of the Tennessee House of Representatives
- In office 1881–1883

Personal details
- Born: Zachary Taylor; May 9, 1849 Brownsville, Tennessee, U.S.
- Died: February 19, 1921 (aged 71) Ellendale, Tennessee, U.S.
- Party: Republican
- Education: Virginia Military Institute; Cumberland School of Law
- Profession: Attorney; Insurance; Politician

Zachary Taylor (May 9, 1849 – February 19, 1921) was a 19th-century American lawyer and politician who was a one-term U.S. Representative from Tennessee from 1885 to 1887.

== Biography ==
Born near Brownsville, Tennessee, Taylor attended J.I. Hall's School near Covington, Tennessee, and was graduated from the Virginia Military Institute at Lexington as senior captain July 4, 1872. He graduated from Cumberland School of Law at Cumberland University, Lebanon, Tennessee, in January 1874. He was admitted to the bar and commenced practice in Covington in 1878.

== Career ==
Taylor served in the State senate from 1881 to 1883. He was Postmaster of Covington from July 1, 1883, to January 1, 1885, when he resigned.

=== Congress ===
Elected as a Republican to the Forty-ninth Congress, Taylor served from March 4, 1885 to March 3, 1887. He was an unsuccessful candidate for reelection in 1886 to the Fiftieth Congress.

=== Later career ===
He moved to Memphis, Tennessee, and engaged in the general life insurance business.

Taylor was delegate to the Republican National Convention in 1896. He later moved to San Antonio, Texas.

== Death ==
Taylor died in Ellendale, Tennessee, on February 19, 1921 (age 71 years, 286 days).

U.S. House of Representatives
Preceded by H. Casey Young	Member of the U.S. House of Representatives from Tennessee's 10th congressional district 1885-1887	Succeeded by James Phelan, Jr.
