= John I. Cox =

American politician

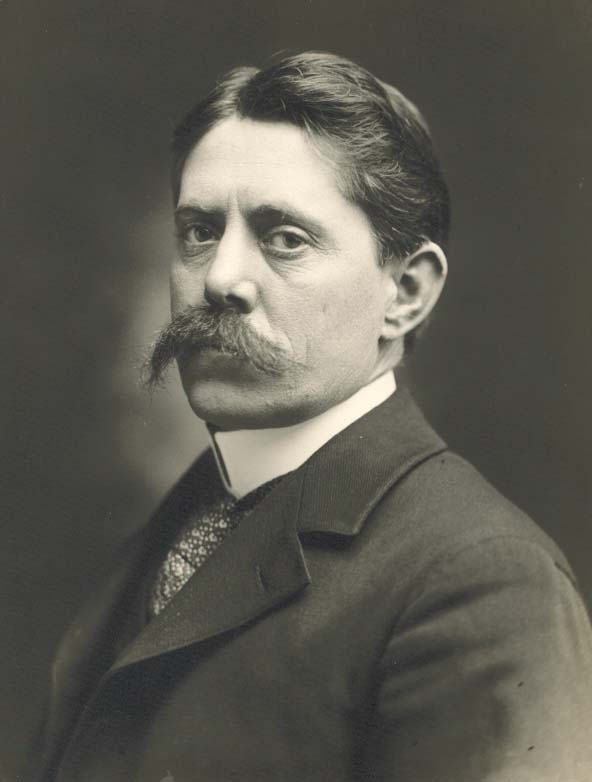
- Official portrait, 1901

29th Governor of Tennessee
- In office March 21, 1905 – January 17, 1907
- Preceded by: James B. Frazier
- Succeeded by: Malcolm R. Patterson

18th Speaker of the Tennessee Senate
- In office January 2, 1905 – March 21, 1905
- Preceded by: Edward T. Seay
- Succeeded by: Ernest Rice

Member of the Tennessee Senate from the 2nd district
- In office January 17, 1907 – January 6, 1913
- Preceded by: Himself
- Succeeded by: J. Parks Worley
- In office January 7, 1901 – March 21, 1905
- Preceded by: John Slack
- Succeeded by: Himself

Member of the Tennessee House of Representatives from Sullivan County
- In office January 6, 1913 – January 4, 1915
- Succeeded by: O. S. Hauk
- In office January 2, 1893 – January 7, 1895
- Preceded by: Charles A. Brown
- Succeeded by: W. A. Robeson

Personal details
- Born: James Isaac Cox; November 23, 1855 Sullivan County, Tennessee, United States
- Died: September 5, 1946 (aged 90) Abingdon, Virginia, United States
- Resting place: Glenwood Cemetery, Bristol, Tennessee
- Party: Democratic
- Spouses: Laura Deaderick (m. 1882; died 1885); Lorena Butler (m. 1889)
- Occupation: Lawyer; politician

John Isaac Cox (November 23, 1855 – September 5, 1946) was an American politician who served as the 29th governor of Tennessee from 1905 to 1907. He was elevated to the position when Governor James B. Frazier resigned, and, as Speaker of the Tennessee Senate, he was the first in the line of succession. He failed to win his party's nomination for a second term, and returned to the state senate, where he remained until 1913. Cox also served as a county judge, city attorney, and local postmaster, and spent two terms in the Tennessee House of Representatives.

The Tennessee state flag was adopted during Cox's term as governor.

== Early life ==
Cox was born in Sullivan County, Tennessee, the son of Henry and Martha (Smith) Cox. His father was a Confederate soldier during the Civil War, and was killed in fighting in 1863. To help his family, young John worked for several years as a farm laborer before becoming a rural mail carrier at the age of 16. Two years later, he was appointed Road Commissioner of Sullivan County. He served as a justice of the peace in the late 1870s.

Cox was educated at field schools in Sullivan County, and attended Jefferson Academy in Blountville for at least one term. He began reading law with Judge William V. Deaderick (his future father-in-law) in 1880, and was admitted to the bar shortly afterward. He practiced in Blountville for several years before being elected Judge of Sullivan County in 1886.

In 1889, Cox moved to Bristol, where he served as a district attorney. He was elected to the state House of Representatives in 1892, but served only one term. He was elected to the state senate in 1900.

== Governor ==
In early 1905, following his reelection to a third state senate term, Cox was elevated to Speaker of that body, which in Tennessee is the governor's designated successor. On March 9, U.S. Senator William B. Bate died in office, prompting a scramble among potential candidates for his vacant senate seat. Former Governor Robert Love Taylor had for years tried unsuccessfully to get elected to the Senate, and considered himself next in line should one of the two seats become vacant. Governor James B. Frazier, however, also wanted the seat, and quickly convened a special session of the General Assembly to have himself elected before Taylor could return from a speaking tour.

On March 21, Frazier resigned and headed to Washington, D.C., to take his seat in the Senate, and Cox, as the constitutional successor, was sworn in as governor. Taylor and his supporters were furious at Frazier's actions, and accused Cox and the state's other U.S. senator, Edward W. Carmack, of conspiring with Frazier. Fearing a split in the party, state Democrats allowed Taylor to challenge Carmack in a statewide primary in 1906 (this was the first Senate primary in state history, as U.S. senators were chosen by state legislatures prior to the adoption of the 17th Amendment), which Taylor won. Bitterness toward Frazier and skepticism of Cox remained, however.

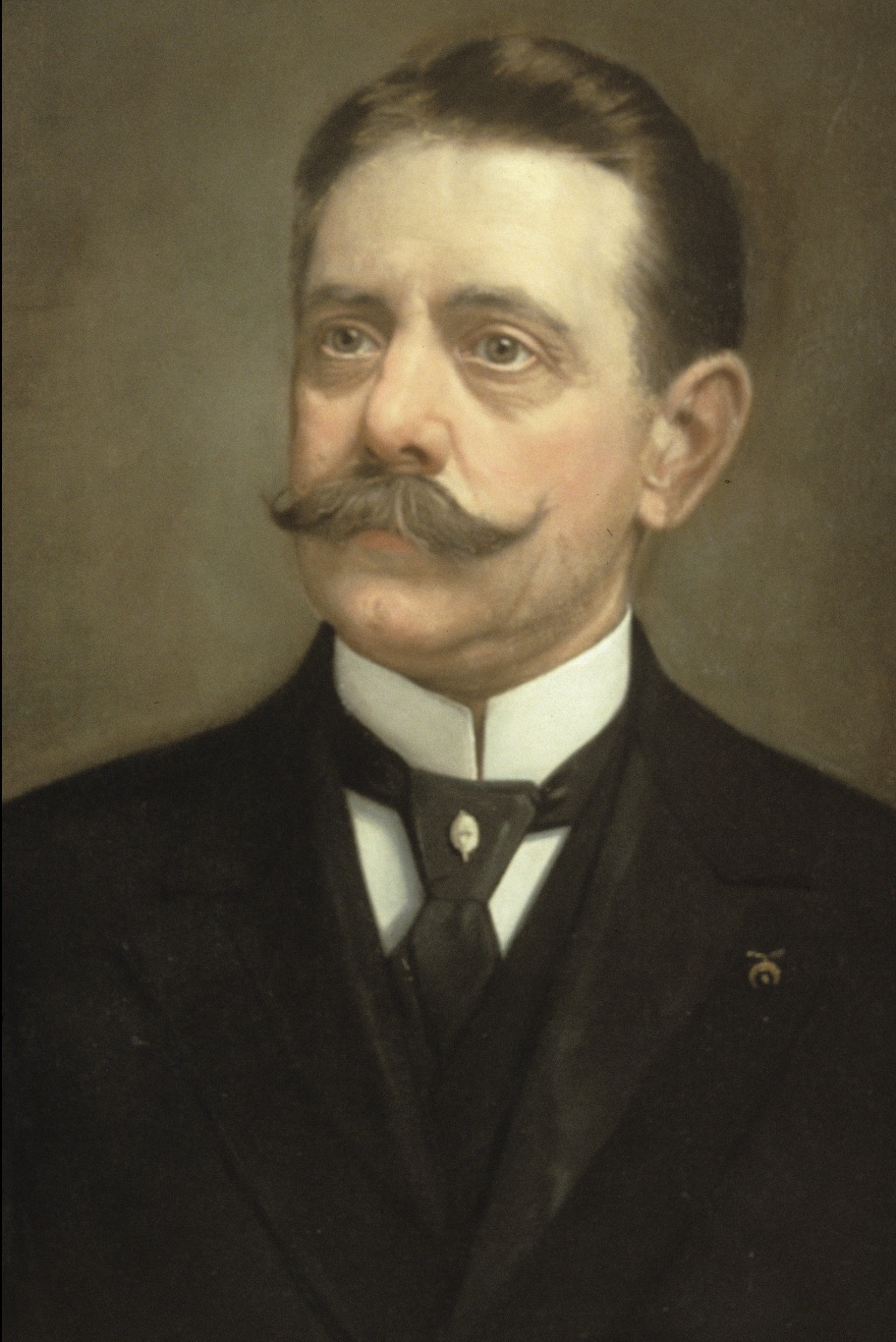
Portrait of Governor Cox by Lloyd Branson

Cox continued Frazier's policies and made few administrative changes. He implemented quarantines in an effort to eradicate yellow fever, which had long plagued the swampy western part of the state, and called up the state guard to protect strikebreakers at a coal mine in Tracy City during a miners' strike in 1905. He also dealt with rampant prison rioting, and increased pensions for Confederate veterans and spouses. In April 1905, a few weeks after Cox took office, the current Flag of Tennessee, designed by Colonel LeRoy Reeves of Johnson City, was adopted.

In the gubernatorial race of 1906, Malcolm R. Patterson of Memphis challenged Cox for the Democratic Party's nomination. He quickly gained the support of a number of party leaders, including former governors Robert Love Taylor and Benton McMillin, who blamed Cox for engineering Frazier's controversial election in the General Assembly. At the party's convention in late May, Patterson and Cox engaged in a fierce battle for delegates, and though it was close, a rule change allowed Patterson to claim all delegates from Davidson County, and he was declared the nominee on June 1. Cox refused to support Patterson in the general election, and the two remained at odds in subsequent months.

In 1908, Colonel Duncan Cooper, a Patterson advisor, arranged for a meeting between Cox and Patterson that helped mend the ties between the two. Ex-Senator Carmack, a Patterson opponent, published a newspaper article in October 1908 ruthlessly mocking Cooper for arranging the meeting. On November 8, Carmack was shot and killed by Cooper's son, Robin, in downtown Nashville.

== Later life ==
Cox remained in the state senate until 1913. He served another term as a state representative from 1913 until 1915, and was the postmaster of Bristol from 1914 to 1922. He afterward retired to his farm in the Holston Hills section of Bristol, but continued stumping for Democratic Party politicians. In the 1930s, he campaigned for President Franklin D. Roosevelt, and supported the creation of the Tennessee Valley Authority.

Cox died on September 5, 1946, at George Ben Johnston Hospital in Abingdon, Virginia, following a long struggle with kidney illness. His was 90 years and 9 months old, becoming the longest-lived governor in Tennessee history (Tom Rye also lived to 90, but was shy by 6 months of tying Cox). In April 2018, Winfield Dunn (b. July 1927) broke Cox's longevity record and as of July 2019, has surpassed his 92nd birthday to become the longest-lived governor in Tennessee history.

== Family ==
Cox married Laura Deaderick, daughter of his law mentor, William Deaderick, in 1882. They had one son, William, before she died in 1885. In 1889, Cox married Lorena Butler. They had two children, Matthew and Mary. Lorena Butler was a cousin of the Taylor brothers, Robert Love and Alf, who both also served as governors.

== See also ==
- List of governors of Tennessee

Political offices
Preceded by James B. Frazier	Governor of Tennessee; 1905–1907	Succeeded by Malcolm R. Patterson
