= List of former United States representatives (I) =

This is a complete list of former United States representatives whose last names begin with the letter I.

== Number of years and terms the member has served ==
The number of years the representative/delegate has served in Congress indicates the number of terms the representative/delegate has. Note the representative/delegate can also serve non-consecutive terms if the representative/delegate loses election and wins re-election to the House.

- 2 years - 1 or 2 terms
- 4 years - 2 or 3 terms
- 6 years - 3 or 4 terms
- 8 years - 4 or 5 terms
- 10 years - 5 or 6 terms
- 12 years - 6 or 7 terms
- 14 years - 7 or 8 terms
- 16 years - 8 or 9 terms
- 18 years - 9 or 10 terms
- 20 years - 10 or 11 terms
- 22 years - 11 or 12 terms
- 24 years - 12 or 13 terms
- 26 years - 13 or 14 terms
- 28 years - 14 or 15 terms
- 30 years - 15 or 16 terms
- 32 years - 16 or 17 terms
- 34 years - 17 or 18 terms
- 36 years - 18 or 19 terms
- 38 years - 19 or 20 terms
- 40 years - 20 or 21 terms
- 42 years - 21 or 22 terms
- 44 years - 22 or 23 terms
- 46 years - 23 or 24 terms
- 48 years - 24 or 25 terms
- 50 years - 25 or 26 terms
- 52 years - 26 or 27 terms
- 54 years - 27 or 28 terms
- 56 years - 28 or 29 terms
- 58 years - 29 or 30 terms

Name	Term	State/ Territory	Party	Lifespan
Richard Howard Ichord Jr.	1961–1981	Missouri	Democratic	1926–1992
Santiago Iglesias	1933–1939	Puerto Rico	Socialist	1872–1939
James T. Igoe	1927–1933	Illinois	Democratic	1883–1971
Michael L. Igoe	1935	Illinois	Democratic	1885–1967
William L. Igoe	1913–1921	Missouri	Democratic	1879–1953
Peter Ihrie Jr.	1829–1833	Pennsylvania	Democratic	1796–1871
Frank N. Ikard	1951–1961	Texas	Democratic	1913–1991
George P. Ikirt	1893–1895	Ohio	Democratic	1852–1927
Daniel Ilsley	1807–1809	Massachusetts	Democratic-Republican	1740–1813
Lawrence E. Imhoff	1933–1939; 1941–1943	Ohio	Democratic	1895–1988
James H. Imlay	1797–1801	New Jersey	Federalist	1764–1823
Samuel Williams Inge	1847–1851	Alabama	Democratic	1817–1868
William Marshall Inge	1833–1835	Tennessee	Democratic	1802–1846
Charles Jared Ingersoll	1813–1815; 1841–1849	Pennsylvania	Democratic	1782–1862
Colin M. Ingersoll	1851–1855	Connecticut	Democratic	1819–1903
Ebon C. Ingersoll	1864–1871	Illinois	Republican	1831–1879
Joseph Reed Ingersoll	1835–1837; 1841–1849	Pennsylvania	Whig	1786–1868
Ralph I. Ingersoll	1825–1833	Connecticut	National Republican	1789–1872
Samuel Ingham	1835–1839	Connecticut	Democratic	1793–1881
Samuel D. Ingham	1813–1818; 1822–1829	Pennsylvania	Democratic-Republican	1779–1860
Bob Inglis	1993–1999; 2005–2011	South Carolina	Republican	1959–present
Jim Inhofe	1987–1994	Oklahoma	Republican	1934–2024
Daniel Inouye	1959–1963	Hawaii	Democratic	1924–2012
Jay Inslee	1999–2012	Washington	Democratic	1951–present
Andy Ireland	1977–1984; 1984–1993	Florida	Democratic; Republican	1930–2024
Clifford C. Ireland	1917–1923	Illinois	Republican	1878–1930
Alfred Briggs Irion	1885–1887	Louisiana	Democratic	1833–1903
Alexander Irvin	1847–1849	Pennsylvania	Whig	1800–1874
James Irvin	1841–1845	Pennsylvania	Whig	1800–1862
William W. Irvin	1829–1833	Ohio	Democratic	1779–1842
William Irvine	1793–1795	Pennsylvania	Anti-Administration	1741–1804
William Irvine	1859–1861	New York	Republican	1820–1882
Leonard Irving	1949–1953	Missouri	Democratic	1898–1962
William Irving	1814–1819	New York	Democratic-Republican	1766–1821
Donald J. Irwin	1959–1961; 1965–1969	Connecticut	Democratic	1926–2013
Edward M. Irwin	1925–1931	Illinois	Republican	1869–1933
Harvey Samuel Irwin	1901–1903	Kentucky	Republican	1844–1916
Jared Irwin	1813–1817	Pennsylvania	Democratic-Republican	1768–1818
Thomas Irwin	1829–1831	Pennsylvania	Democratic	1785–1870
William W. Irwin	1841–1843	Pennsylvania	Whig	1803–1856
Jacob C. Isacks	1823–1825; 1825–1833	Tennessee	Democratic-Republican; Democratic	1767–1835
Leo Isacson	1948–1949	New York	American Laborite	1910–1996
Johnny Isakson	1999–2005	Georgia	Republican	1944–2021
Steve Israel	2001–2017	New York	Democratic	1958–present
Ernest Istook	1993–2007	Oklahoma	Republican	1950–present
Anthony F. Ittner	1877–1879	Missouri	Republican	1837–1931
Alfred Iverson Sr.	1847–1849	Georgia	Democratic	1798–1873
Willard Ives	1851–1853	New York	Democratic	1806–1896
Edouard Izac	1937–1947	California	Democratic	1891–1990
James F. Izlar	1894–1895	South Carolina	Democratic	1832–1912
