= William Poe =

William Poe may refer to:

- William F. Poe, mayor of Tampa, Florida
- William Henry Leonard Poe, American sailor and amateur poet
- W. M. Poe, Tennessee state representative
