= Tennessee's 10th congressional district =

U.S. House district for Tennessee

- Obsolete district
- Created: 1830; 1875; 1940
- Eliminated: 1860; 1930; 1950
- Years active: 1833–1863; 1875–1933; 1943–1953

Tennessee's 10th congressional district was a district of the United States Congress in Tennessee. It was lost to redistricting in 1953. Its last representative was Clifford Davis.

== List of representatives ==
Representative	Party	Years	Cong ress	Note
District established March 4, 1833
William M. Inge (Fayetteville)	Jacksonian	March 4, 1833 – March 3, 1835	23rd	Elected in 1833. Retired.
Ebenezer J. Shields (Pulaski)	Anti-Jacksonian	March 4, 1835 – March 3, 1837	24th 25th	Elected in 1835. Re-elected in 1837. Lost re-election.
Ebenezer J. Shields (Pulaski)	Whig	March 4, 1837 – March 3, 1839	24th 25th	Elected in 1835. Re-elected in 1837. Lost re-election.
Aaron V. Brown (Pulaski)	Democratic	March 4, 1839 – March 3, 1843	26th 27th	Elected in 1839. Re-elected in 1841. Redistricted to the 6th district.
John B. Ashe (Brownsville)	Whig	March 4, 1843 – March 3, 1845	28th	Elected in 1843. Retired.
Frederick P. Stanton (Memphis)	Democratic	March 4, 1845 – March 3, 1855	29th 30th 31st 32nd 33rd	Elected in 1845. Re-elected in 1847. Re-elected in 1849. Re-elected in 1851. Re-elected in 1853. Retired.
Thomas Rivers (Somerville)	Know Nothing	March 4, 1855 – March 3, 1857	34th	Elected in 1855. Retired.
William T. Avery (Pulaski)	Democratic	March 4, 1857 – March 3, 1861	35th 36th	Elected in 1857. Re-elected in 1859. Could not seek re-election, as West Tennessee seceded.
District inactive		March 4, 1861 – March 3, 1863	37th	Civil War
District dissolved March 4, 1863
District re-established March 4, 1875
H. Casey Young (Memphis)	Democratic	March 4, 1875 – March 3, 1881	44th 45th 46th	Elected in 1874. Re-elected in 1876. Re-elected in 1878. Lost re-election.
William R. Moore (Memphis)	Republican	March 4, 1881 – March 3, 1883	47th	Elected in 1880. Renominated but declined.
H. Casey Young (Memphis)	Democratic	March 4, 1883 – March 3, 1885	48th	Elected in 1882. Retired.
Zachary Taylor (Covington)	Republican	March 4, 1885 – March 3, 1887	49th	Elected in 1884. Lost re-election.
James Phelan, Jr. (Memphis)	Democratic	March 4, 1887 – January 30, 1891	50th 51st	Elected in 1886. Re-elected in 1888. Retired but died before next term began.
Vacant		January 30, 1891 – March 4, 1891	51st	
Josiah Patterson (Memphis)	Democratic	March 4, 1891 – March 3, 1897	52nd 53rd 54th	Elected in 1890. Re-elected in 1892. Re-elected in 1894. Lost re-election as a National Democrat.
Edward W. Carmack (Memphis)	Democratic	March 4, 1897 – March 3, 1901	55th 56th	Elected in 1896. Re-elected in 1898. Retired to run for U.S. senator.
Malcolm R. Patterson (Memphis)	Democratic	March 4, 1901 – November 5, 1906	57th 58th 59th	Elected in 1900. Re-elected in 1902. Re-elected in 1904. Retired to run for Governor of Tennessee and resigned when elected.
Vacant		November 5, 1906 – March 4, 1907	59th	
George Gordon (Memphis)	Democratic	March 4, 1907 – August 9, 1911	60th 61st 62nd	Elected in 1906. Re-elected in 1908. Re-elected in 1910. Died.
Vacant		August 9, 1911 – December 4, 1911	62nd	
Kenneth McKellar (Memphis)	Democratic	December 4, 1911 – March 3, 1917	62nd 63rd 64th	Elected to finish Gordon's term. Re-elected in 1912. Re-elected in 1914. Retired to run for U.S. senator.
Hubert Fisher (Memphis)	Democratic	March 4, 1917 – March 3, 1931	65th 66th 67th 68th 69th 70th 71st	Elected in 1916. Re-elected in 1918. Re-elected in 1920. Re-elected in 1922. Re-elected in 1924. Re-elected in 1926. Re-elected in 1928. Retired.
E. H. Crump (Memphis)	Democratic	March 4, 1931 – March 3, 1933	72nd	Elected in 1930. Redistricted to the 9th district.
District dissolved March 4, 1933
District re-established January 3, 1943
Clifford Davis (Memphis)	Democratic	January 3, 1943 – January 3, 1953	78th 79th 80th 81st 82nd	Redistricted from the 9th district and re-elected in 1942. Re-elected in 1944. Re-elected in 1946. Re-elected in 1948. Re-elected in 1950. Redistricted to the 9th district.
District dissolved January 3, 1953

== Election results ==
=== 1920 ===
1920 United States House of Representatives elections in Tennessee
Party	Candidate	Votes	%
Democratic	Hubert Fisher (Incumbent)	23,987	80.46%
Republican	Wayman Wilkerson	5,047	16.93%
Socialist	G. J. Braun	779	2.61%
Total votes		29,813	100%
Democratic hold			

=== 1922 ===
1922 United States House of Representatives elections in Tennessee
Party	Candidate	Votes	%
Democratic	Hubert Fisher (Incumbent)	10,407	89.06%
Republican	Thomas C. Phelan	1,279	10.94%
Total votes		11,686	100%
Democratic hold			

=== 1924 ===
1924 United States House of Representatives elections in Tennessee
Party	Candidate	Votes	%
Democratic	Hubert Fisher (Incumbent)	16,306	74.02%
Independent	George H. Poole	2,923	13.27%
Republican	Harry Spears	2,801	12.71%
Total votes		22,030	100%
Democratic hold			
