= Thomas Rivers =

American politician from Tennessee (1819–1863)

Member of the U.S. House of Representatives from Tennessee's 10th district
- In office March 4, 1855 – March 3, 1857
- Preceded by: Frederick P. Stanton
- Succeeded by: William T. Avery

Personal details
- Born: September 18, 1819 Franklin County, Tennessee
- Died: March 18, 1863 (aged 43) Somerville, Tennessee
- Party: American Party
- Spouse: Mary Ann Rivers
- Education: La Grange College, Alabama
- Profession: planter; lawyer; politician

Thomas Rivers (September 18, 1819 – March 18, 1863) was an American politician and a member of the United States House of Representatives for the 10th congressional district of Tennessee.

== Biography ==
Rivers was born in Franklin County, Tennessee, on September 18, 1819. He received an academic education and attended La Grange College in Alabama. He studied law, was admitted to the bar in 1839.

== Career ==
Rivers began his practice of law in Somerville, Tennessee. He also served for many years in the state militia ranking as a brigadier general.

Elected as the candidate of the American Party to the Thirty-fourth Congress, but not a candidate for renomination in 1856, Rivers served from March 4, 1855, to March 3, 1857.

Resuming his profession, Rivers continued the practice of law until his death on his plantation near Somerville, Tennessee.

== Death ==
Rivers died on March 18, 1863. He is interred in Somerville Cemetery, Somerville, Tennessee.

U.S. House of Representatives
Preceded by Frederick P. Stanton	Member of the U.S. House of Representatives from Tennessee's 10th congressional district 1855–1857	Succeeded by William T. Avery
