= Ebenezer J. Shields =

American politician

Member of the U.S. House of Representatives from Tennessee's 10th district
- In office March 4, 1835 – March 3, 1839
- Preceded by: William M. Inge
- Succeeded by: Aaron V. Brown

Member of the Tennessee House of Representatives
- In office 1833-1835

Personal details
- Born: December 22, 1778 Georgia
- Died: April 21, 1846 (aged 67) La Grange, Texas
- Party: Anti-Jacksonian Whig
- Education: University of Nashville, Tennessee
- Profession: lawyer; politician

Ebenezer J. Shields was an American politician who represented Tennessee's tenth district in the United States House of Representatives.

== Biography ==
Shields was born in Georgia on December 22, 1778. He moved to Tennessee in 1809 and settled on Robertson Fork Creek near Lynnville. He graduated from the University of Nashville, Tennessee in 1827. He studied law, was admitted to the bar, and practiced law in Pulaski, Tennessee.

== Career ==
An elegant public speaker, Shields was a member of the Tennessee House of Representatives between 1833 and 1835.

Shields was elected as a White supporter to the Twenty-fourth Congress by the tenth district of Tennessee and re-elected as a Whig. He was an unsuccessful candidate for re-election in 1838 to the Twenty-sixth Congress. He served from March 4, 1835 to March 3, 1839. He resumed his profession in Pulaski and moved to Memphis, Tennessee in 1844, where he continued the practice of his profession. He was Presidential Elector for Tennessee, 1840.

== Death ==
Shields died on April 21, 1846(age 67 years, 120 days near La Grange, Texas. It is unknown where he is interred.

U.S. House of Representatives
Preceded by William M. Inge	Member of the U.S. House of Representatives from Tennessee's 10th congressional district 1835–1839	Succeeded by Aaron V. Brown
