= H. Casey Young =

American politician (1828–1899)

Hiram Casey Young
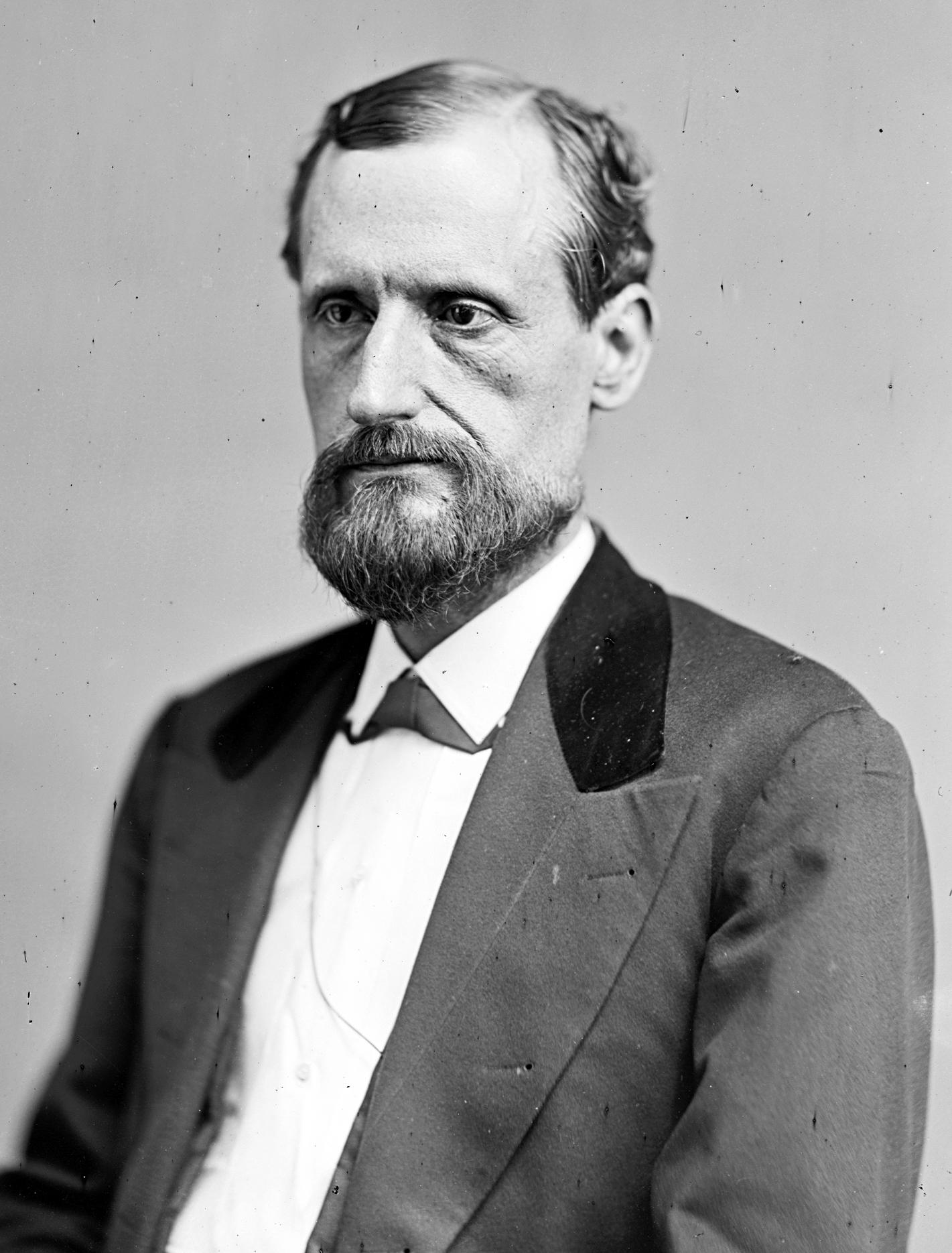

Member of the U.S. House of Representatives from Tennessee's 10th district
- In office March 4, 1875 – March 3, 1881
- Preceded by: William T. Avery
- Succeeded by: William R. Moore
- In office March 4, 1883 – March 3, 1885
- Preceded by: William R. Moore
- Succeeded by: Zachary Taylor

Personal details
- Born: December 14, 1828 Tuscaloosa, Alabama, U.S.
- Died: August 17, 1899 (aged 70) Memphis, Tennessee, U.S.
- Party: Democratic
- Profession: lawyer; politician

Hiram Casey Young (December 14, 1828 – August 17, 1899) was an American lawyer and politician and a member of the United States House of Representatives for the 10th congressional district of Tennessee.

== Biography ==
Young was born in Tuscaloosa, Alabama. He moved with his parents to a farm near Byhalia, Mississippi, in 1838. He attended the local schools, was tutored by his father, and also the Cavalry.

== Career ==
Elected as a Democrat to the Forty-fourth, Forty-fifth, and Forty-sixth Congresses, Young served from March 4, 1875, to March 3, 1881, but was an unsuccessful candidate for re-election in 1880. However he was elected to the Forty-eighth, serving in that period from March 4, 1883, to March 3, 1885. During this Forty-eighth Congress, he was the chairman of the United States House Committee on Expenditures in the Department of the Interior. He was not a candidate for renomination, but resumed the practice of law.

== Death ==
Young died in Memphis, Tennessee, on August 17, 1899, aged 70. He is interred at Elmwood Cemetery.

U.S. House of Representatives
Preceded by Civil War	Member of the U.S. House of Representatives from Tennessee's 10th congressional district 1875–1881	Succeeded by William R. Moore
Preceded by William R. Moore	Member of the U.S. House of Representatives from Tennessee's 10th congressional district 1883–1885	Succeeded by Zachary Taylor
