= Josiah Patterson =

American politician (1837–1904)

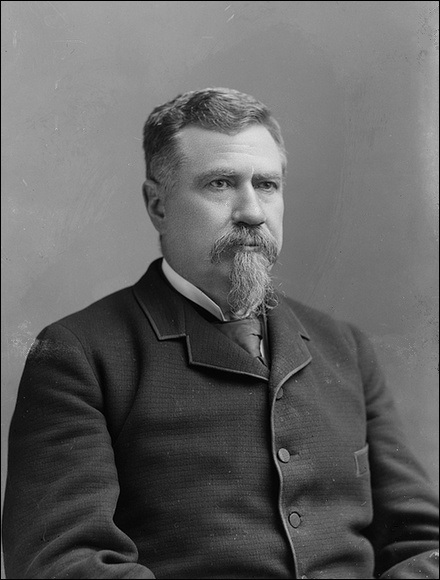

Member of the U.S. House of Representatives from Tennessee's 10th district
- In office March 4, 1891 – March 3, 1897
- Preceded by: James Phelan, Jr.
- Succeeded by: Edward W. Carmack

Personal details
- Born: April 14, 1837 Morgan County, Alabama, U.S.
- Died: February 10, 1904 (aged 66) Memphis, Tennessee, U.S.
- Resting place: Forest Hill Cemetery; Memphis, Tennessee, U.S.
- Citizenship: United States
- Party: Democratic
- Spouse: Josephine Rice Patterson
- Children: Malcolm Rice Patterson; Mary Louisa Patterson; Ann Eliza Patterson
- Profession: Attorney; politician

Military service
- Allegiance: Confederate States of America
- Branch/service: Confederate States Army
- Years of service: September 1861 - May 1865
- Rank: first lieutenant colonel
- Unit: 1st Alabama Cavalry Regiment; 5th Alabama Cavalry Regiment
- Battles/wars: American Civil War

Josiah Patterson (April 14, 1837 – February 10, 1904) was a Confederate soldier, political figure, and a member of the United States House of Representatives for the 10th District of Tennessee.

== Biography ==
Patterson was born in Morgan County, Alabama. He attended local schools and the Somerville Academy in Somerville, Alabama. He then studied law, and in 1859 was admitted to the bar. He began his practice in Morgan County. He married Josephine Rice on December 22, 1859 in Morgan County, Alabama. They had three children, Malcolm Rice, Mary Louisa, and Ann Eliza.

== Career ==
In September 1861, early in the American Civil War, Patterson enlisted in the Confederate Army. The following year, he was commissioned a first lieutenant in the 1st Alabama Cavalry Regiment. Patterson was promoted through the ranks until he became a colonel and was assigned command of the 5th Alabama Cavalry Regiment. He served in Gen. Philip Dale Roddey's brigade for the remainder of the war, mostly in North Alabama. Surrendering with his regiment at the war's end in May 1865, Patterson returned home and resumed his law practice.

In January 1867, Patterson relocated to Florence, Alabama, and five years later moved to Memphis, Tennessee. He served in the Tennessee House of Representatives from 1883 to 1885.

Patterson was elected as a Democrat to the Fifty-second, Fifty-third, and Fifty-fourth Congresses. He served from March 4, 1891 to March 3, 1897. Patterson was an unsuccessful candidate for re-election to the Fifty-fifth Congress as a Gold Democrat. He continued his law practice in Memphis until he died.

== Death ==
On February 10, 1904, Patterson died in Memphis. He is interred at Forest Hill Cemetery in Memphis.

Patterson's son, Malcolm Rice Patterson (June 7, 1861 – March 8, 1935), served as governor of Tennessee from 1907 to 1911. His granddaughter, Virginia Foster Durr (August 6, 1903 – February 24, 1999), was a friend of Rosa Parks and active in the Civil Rights Movement.

U.S. House of Representatives
Preceded by James Phelan, Jr.	Member of the U.S. House of Representatives from Tennessee's 10th congressional district 1891-1897	Succeeded by Edward W. Carmack
