= George Gordon (Civil War general) =

American military figure and politician

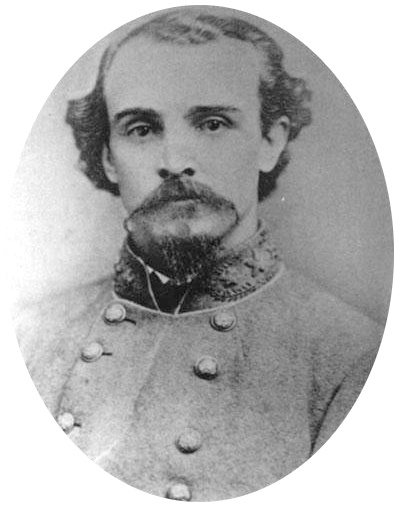

Member of the U.S. House of Representatives from Tennessee's 10th district
- In office March 4, 1907 – August 9, 1911
- Preceded by: Malcolm R. Patterson
- Succeeded by: Kenneth D. McKellar

Grand Dragon for the Realm of Tennessee
- In office 1867–1871

Personal details
- Born: George Washington Gordon; October 5, 1836 Pulaski, Tennessee, U.S.
- Died: August 9, 1911 (aged 74) Memphis, Tennessee, U.S.
- Resting place: Elmwood Cemetery
- Party: Democratic
- Education: Western Military Institute
- Occupation: engineer, lawyer, Indian agent, railroad commissioner, school superintendent

Military service
- Allegiance: Confederate States of America
- Branch/service: Confederate States Army
- Years of service: 1861–1865
- Rank: Brigadier General
- Commands: 11th Tennessee Infantry Regiment; Vaughan's Brigade
- Battles/wars: American Civil War

George Washington Gordon (October 5, 1836 – August 9, 1911) was a general in the Confederate States Army during the American Civil War. After the war, he practiced law in Pulaski, Tennessee, where the Ku Klux Klan was formed. He became one of the Klan's first members. In 1867, Gordon became the Klan's first Grand Dragon for the Realm of Tennessee, and wrote its "Precept," a book describing its organization, purpose, and principles. He was also a member of the United States House of Representatives for the 10th congressional district of Tennessee.

== Early life ==
Gordon was born on October 5, 1836, in Pulaski, Tennessee. His father was Andrew Gordon and his mother, Eliza K. Gordon. He grew up in Mississippi and Texas. Gordon graduated from the Western Military Institute in Nashville, Tennessee, in 1859. He worked on the Nashville & Northwestern Railway.

== Civil War ==
At the start of the Civil War, Gordon enlisted in the military service of the Confederacy and became drillmaster of the 11th Regiment, Tennessee Infantry, which saw action defending the Cumberland Gap during the winter and spring months of 1862. Gordon became regimental commander when James E. Rains assumed command of Carter L. Stevenson's brigade, and fought at the Battle of Tazewell on August 6, 1862. In November 1862 he became the regiment's colonel. Gordon was promoted to brigadier general in August 1864, and was one of the youngest Confederate generals. Gordon led Vaughn's Brigade, in Maj. Gen. John C. Brown's division, at the Battle of Franklin (November 30, 1864), where he was wounded and captured. Many of the men he led are buried at McGavock Confederate Cemetery in Franklin, Tennessee. Gordon was sent to the prisoner-of-war camp at Fort Warren until he was paroled in the summer of 1865.

== Postbellum career ==
After the war, Gordon studied law at Cumberland University, was admitted to the bar, and practiced in Memphis, Tennessee, until 1883. He was appointed one of the railroad commissioners of Tennessee. He received an appointment in the Department of the Interior in 1885, as special Indian agent in Arizona and Nevada, and he served until 1889. He returned to Memphis and resumed the practice of law. He was the superintendent of Memphis city schools between 1889 and 1907.

=== Ku Klux Klan involvement ===
The KKK (the Klan) was formed by veterans of the Confederate Army in Pulaski, Tennessee, in 1866 and soon expanded throughout the state and beyond. Gordon was an early initiate and likely wrote the organization's original Prescript in 1867 and its revised edition the following year. Following Gordon's death, his widow, Minnie, claimed that he had been the original Grand Wizard of the Klan and that it was he, not Nathan Bedford Forrest, who disbanded it.

=== Political career ===
Gordon was elected as a Democrat to the Sixtieth, Sixty-first, and Sixty-second Congresses. He served from March 4, 1907, until his death in Memphis. He was interred in Elmwood Cemetery in Memphis.

== See also ==
- List of American Civil War generals (Confederate)
- List of members of the United States Congress who died in office (1900–1949)

== Notes ==
U.S. House of Representatives
Preceded by Malcolm R. Patterson	Member of the U.S. House of Representatives from Tennessee's 10th congressional district March 4, 1907 – August 9, 1911	Succeeded by Kenneth McKellar
