= 1906 Tennessee gubernatorial election =

- November 6, 1906
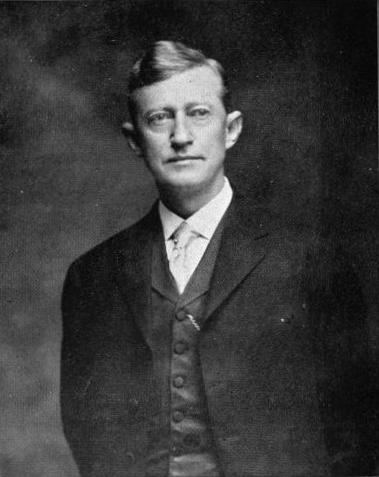

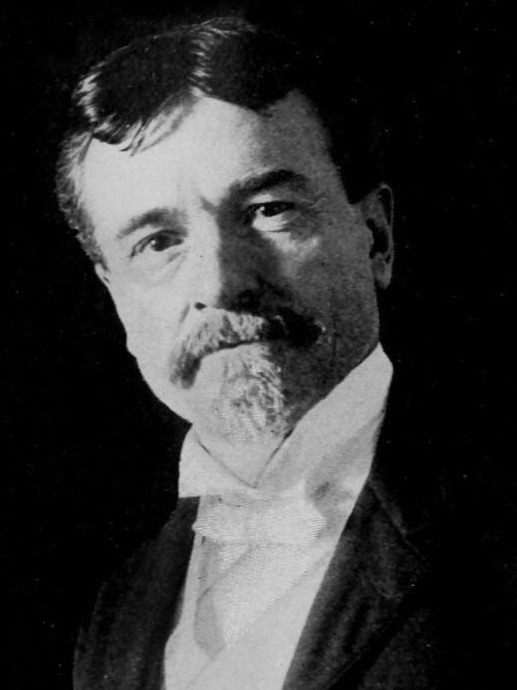
Nominee	Malcolm R. Patterson	Henry Clay Evans
Party	Democratic	Republican
Popular vote	111,876	92,804
Percentage	54.42%	45.14%
- County results Patterson: 50–60% 60–70% 70–80% 80–90% >90% Evans: 50–60% 60–70% 70–80% 80–90% >90%
Governor before election
John I. Cox
Democratic
Elected Governor
Malcolm R. Patterson
Democratic

The 1906 Tennessee gubernatorial election was held on November 6, 1906. Following the death of Senator William B. Bate in March 1905, governor James B. Frazier quickly convened the General Assembly and had himself elected to the vacant Senate seat. John I. Cox, who as speaker of the state senate was Frazier's constitutional successor (and who helped engineer Frazier's election in the General Assembly), then became governor. Malcolm R. Patterson narrowly defeated governor Cox for the Democratic nomination. In the general election, Patterson defeated Republican nominee Henry Clay Evans with 54.42% of the vote. Evans also ran for governor in 1894, but narrowly lost.

In April 1905, a few weeks after Cox took office, the current Flag of Tennessee, designed by Colonel LeRoy Reeves of Johnson City, was adopted.

== Background ==
Former governor Robert Love Taylor, who had long aspired to a seat in the U.S. Senate, was outraged by Frazier's maneuvering to secure the vacant Senate position for himself. Taylor accused James B. Frazier, along with John I. Cox and Senator Edward W. Carmack, of conspiring to control the Democratic Party.

Sensing the party's frustration with Cox over the Frazier election, Malcolm R. Patterson decided to challenge Cox for the party's nomination for governor in 1906. At the party's convention in late May, as Patterson and Cox battled for delegates, a rule change allotted Patterson all of the delegates from Davidson County, allowing him to clinch the nomination. Cox was furious, and refused to support Patterson in the general election.

Patterson's Republican opponent, Henry Clay Evans, had been gerrymandered out of Congress in 1890, and had long accused state Democrats of fraudulent tactics. Patterson criticized Evans for his support of the Lodge Bill, which would have provided protections for black voters, and suggested that Evans wanted to empower the state's African-American population. On election day, Patterson won with 111,876 votes to 92,804 for Evans.

== General election ==
=== Candidates ===
Major party candidates

- Malcolm R. Patterson, Democratic
- Henry Clay Evans, Republican

Other candidates

- John M. Ray, Socialist

=== Results ===
1906 Tennessee gubernatorial election
Party	Candidate	Votes	%	±%
Democratic	Malcolm R. Patterson (incumbent)	111,876	54.42%	
Republican	Henry Clay Evans	92,804	45.14%	
Socialist	John M. Ray	900	0.44%	
Majority		19,072		
Turnout				
Democratic hold		Swing		
