= Malcolm R. Patterson =

American politician (1861–1935)

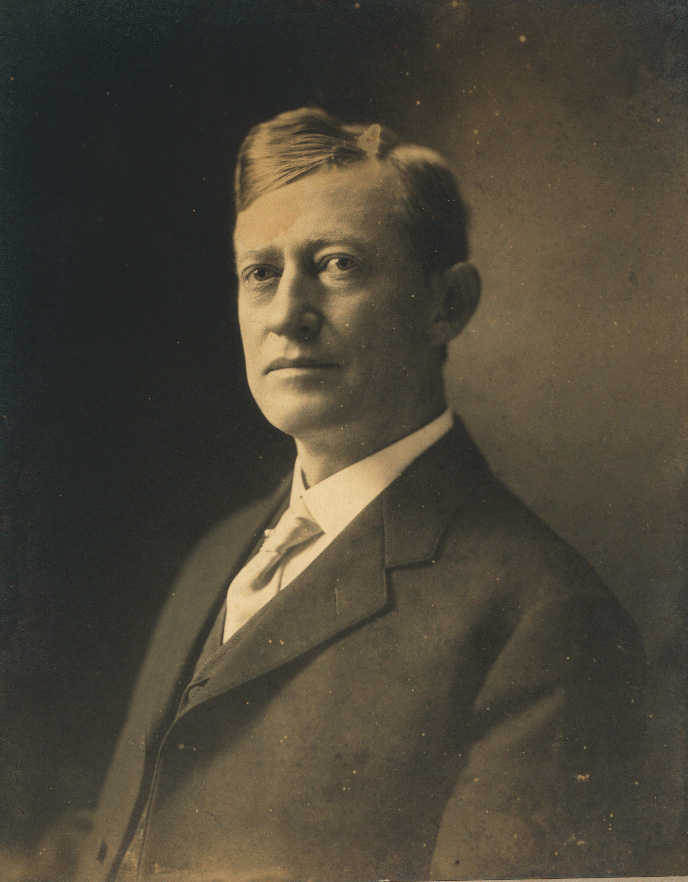
- Patterson in 1910

30th Governor of Tennessee
- In office January 17, 1907 – January 26, 1911
- Preceded by: John I. Cox
- Succeeded by: Ben W. Hooper

Member of the U.S. House of Representatives from Tennessee's 10th district
- In office March 4, 1901 – November 5, 1906
- Preceded by: Edward W. Carmack
- Succeeded by: George Gordon

Personal details
- Born: June 7, 1861 Somerville, Alabama, Confederate States of America
- Died: March 8, 1935 (aged 73) Sarasota, Florida, U.S.
- Resting place: Forest Hill Cemetery; Memphis, Tennessee, U.S.
- Party: Democratic
- Spouse(s): Sarah Johnson Sybil Hodges (m. 1903; died 1906) Mary Russell Gardner (m. 1907)
- Relations: Virginia Foster Durr (niece)
- Parent: Josiah Patterson (father)
- Profession: Attorney

Malcolm Rice Patterson (June 7, 1861 – March 8, 1935) was an American politician and jurist. He served in the U.S. House of Representatives from 1901 to 1906, and as the 30th governor of Tennessee from 1907 to 1911. He later served as a circuit court judge in Memphis (1923–1934), and wrote a weekly column for the Memphis Commercial Appeal (1921–1933).

Patterson was one of Tennessee's most controversial governors. While praised for quelling the Night Riders of Reelfoot Lake uprising in 1908, he was accused of issuing pardons to political allies, most notably his advisor Duncan Brown Cooper, who had been convicted of murdering his political foe Edward W. Carmack. Patterson's veto of a popular prohibition bill in 1909 and his attempts to control the state Democratic primaries in 1910 created a division in the party that allowed Ben W. Hooper to become the first Republican governor elected in the state in nearly 30 years.

== Early life ==
Patterson was born on June 7, 1861 as Hamilton Rice Patterson in Somerville, Alabama, the son of Colonel Josiah Patterson (1837–1904), a Confederate cavalry officer and congressman, and Josephine (Rice) Patterson. In 1866, his father changed his first name to "Malcolm." The family moved to Memphis, Tennessee, in 1872, where Patterson would graduate from Christian Brothers College (now Christian Brothers University). He studied at Vanderbilt University in the early 1880s, and read law with his father. He was admitted to the bar in 1883.

Patterson served as attorney general for Shelby County from 1894 to 1900, when he was elected to the United States House of Representatives. He represented his father's old district, the former Tenth District, from 1901 to 1906.

== Governor ==
Following the death of Senator William B. Bate in March 1905, Governor James B. Frazier quickly convened the General Assembly and had himself elected to the vacant Senate seat. John I. Cox, who as speaker of the state senate was Frazier's constitutional successor (and who helped engineer Frazier's election in the General Assembly), then became governor. Former governor Robert Love Taylor, who had for years sought a U.S. Senate seat, was outraged by Frazier's actions, and accused Frazier, Cox and Senator Edward W. Carmack of conspiring to control the Democratic Party.

Sensing the party's frustration with Cox over the Frazier election, Patterson decided to challenge Cox for the party's nomination for governor in 1906. At the party's convention in late May, as Patterson and Cox battled for delegates, a rule change allotted Patterson all of the delegates from Davidson County, allowing him to clinch the nomination. Cox was furious, and refused to support Patterson in the general election.

Patterson's Republican opponent, Henry Clay Evans, had been gerrymandered out of Congress in 1890, and had long accused state Democrats of fraudulent tactics. Patterson criticized Evans for his support of the Lodge Bill, which would have provided protections for black voters, and suggested that Evans wanted to empower the state's African-American population. On election day, Patterson won with 111,856 votes to 92,804 for Evans.

During Patterson's term as governor, he created a State Highway Commission, signed legislation that banned gambling on horse races, and enacted food and drug regulations. Patterson was the first governor to occupy a governor's mansion (previous governors had lived in hotel rooms), which was purchased by the state, and occupied by successive governors until 1922, when a new residence was built. At the beginning of his second term in 1909, he signed the General Education Act, which created four colleges: East Tennessee State University, Middle Tennessee State University, the University of Memphis, and Tennessee State University. A number of laws aimed at helping workers were also introduced during his tenure.

During the governor's race of 1908, Edward W. Carmack, who had lost his Senate seat to Robert Love Taylor two years earlier, challenged Patterson for the nomination. Carmack ran a strong campaign, but Patterson managed to clinch the nomination with just over 50% of the delegates. The Republican Party, which was embroiled in a power struggle between Walter P. Brownlow and Newell Sanders, initially nominated two candidates, T. Asbury Wright (Brownlow's candidate) and George Tillman (Sanders's candidate), but Wright eventually withdrew.

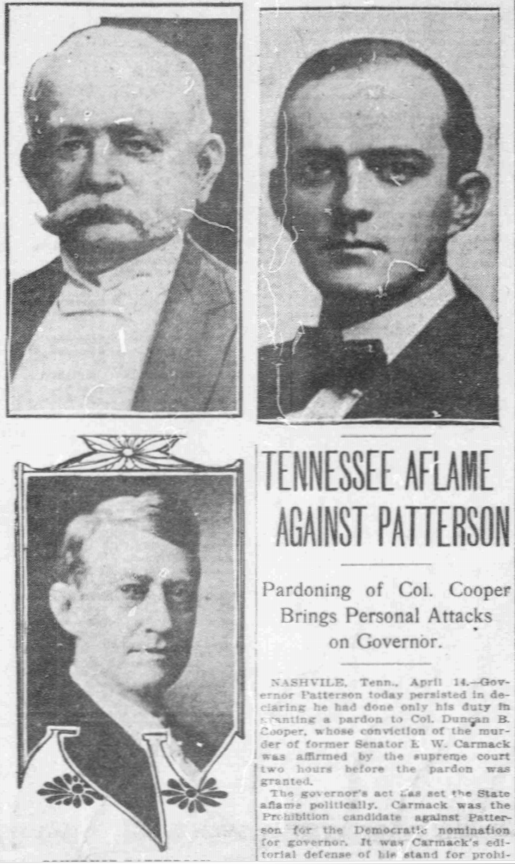
Clipping from The Washington Times discussing Patterson's pardoning of Duncan Cooper (pictured top-left)

In October 1908, a feud between the West Tennessee Land Company and Obion County residents over control of Reelfoot Lake resulted in two of the company's officers, Quentin Rankin and Robert Z. Taylor, being kidnapped by a vigilante group known as the Night Riders. Rankin was murdered by the group, though Taylor managed to escape. Patterson personally led the state guard into Obion County, where they rounded up and incarcerated dozens of Night Riders (several would later be put on trial). This action boosted his popularity, and he defeated Tillman on election day in November, 133,166 votes to 113,233.

Shortly after the election, Patterson became involved in a scandal that would eventually end his political career. Carmack, his former opponent, had published an article ruthlessly mocking Patterson's advisor, Colonel Duncan Cooper. On November 8, 1908, Cooper and his son, Robin, encountered Carmack in the street. Gunfire erupted between Carmack and Robin Cooper, killing the former and injuring the latter. Carmack's supporters blamed Patterson for the shooting, and at one point sought his impeachment. Both Coopers were convicted of murder, though the elder Cooper was pardoned by Patterson in 1910, leading to widespread outrage. Patterson, who had issued more than 1,400 pardons during his tenure, had previously been accused of abusing the pardon power to free corrupt political allies.

At the beginning of Patterson's second term, the state legislature passed two Prohibition measures. One extended the state's Four Mile Law, which banned the sale of liquor within 4 miles (6.4 km) of any school, to cover the entire state (the law had previously applied only to towns with populations of less than 5,000). The second banned the manufacture of liquor for sale. Both bills had widespread support, but Patterson vetoed both, arguing that Prohibition, wherever it had been enacted, had failed. The legislature overrode his veto, however, and the measures became law.

By 1910, a rift had developed in the Democratic Party over state primaries. The "Regular Democrats," led by Patterson, wanted to keep the older system of awarding delegates by county, while the other faction, known as the "Statewiders," led by Francis Gracey Childers, wanted a statewide primary. When Patterson refused to consider a statewide primary, Statewiders withdrew from the convention and nominated their own slate of candidates, allowing Patterson to win the nomination. In state judicial elections on August 4, Statewiders (running as independents) routed the Regular Democrats. Patterson, realizing he had little chance of winning in November, withdrew from the race. His faction quickly nominated former governor and then-United States Senator Robert Love Taylor, but without support from the Statewiders, Taylor was defeated in the general election by Republican Ben W. Hooper.

== Later life ==
In 1913, Patterson "converted" to the temperance cause. He joined the Anti-Saloon League, and toured the nation giving lectures calling for Prohibition.

In 1915, Patterson sought his party's nomination for U.S. Senate, his opponents being Luke Lea (the incumbent) and Kenneth McKellar. Lea placed third and was thus defeated in the initial round of voting, and McKellar, who had the support of rising political boss E. H. Crump, defeated Patterson in a runoff a few weeks later.

In 1921, Patterson began writing a newspaper column for the Memphis Herald Courier entitled, "Day by Day with Governor Patterson," which covered politics and other topics. In 1923, Patterson was appointed Judge of the First Circuit Court in Shelby County by Governor Austin Peay. He held this position until retiring in 1934. In 1932, Patterson again ran for governor, but was defeated in the primary by Hill McAlister.

Patterson died on March 8, 1935, while on a visit to Sarasota, Florida. He was buried in Forest Hill Cemetery in Memphis.

== Family ==
Patterson married his first wife, Sarah Johnson, in 1885. They had three children. Following the death of his first wife, he married Sybil Hodges in 1903. They had one child before her death in 1906. In 1907, shortly after his inauguration as governor, he married Mary Russell Gardner. They had two children. He is one of two Tennessee governors to marry while in office.

Virginia Foster Durr (1903–1999), Patterson's niece (daughter of his sister, Anne), was a noted civil rights activist in the 1950s and 1960s.

== See also ==
- List of governors of Tennessee

Party political offices
Preceded by James B. Frazier	Democratic nominee for Governor of Tennessee; 1906, 1908	Succeeded by Robert Love Taylor
U.S. House of Representatives
Preceded by Edward W. Carmack	Member of the U.S. House of Representatives from Tennessee's 10th congressional district March 4, 1901 – November 5, 1906	Succeeded by George Gordon
Political offices
Preceded by John I. Cox	Governor of Tennessee; 1907—1911	Succeeded by Ben W. Hooper
