= William Robert Moore =

American politician (1839–1909)

William R. Moore
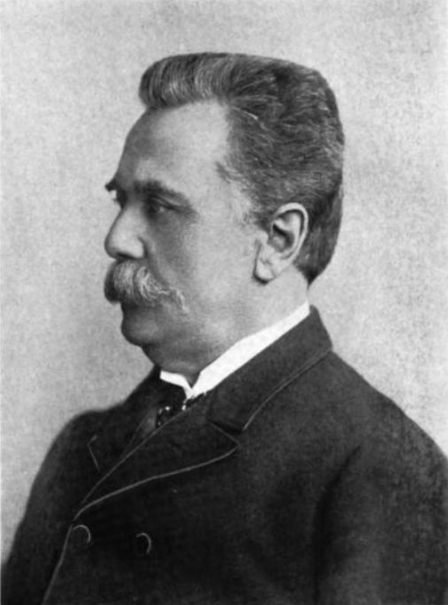

Member of the U.S. House of Representatives from Tennessee's 10th district
- In office March 4, 1881 – March 3, 1883
- Preceded by: H. Casey Young
- Succeeded by: H. Casey Young

Personal details
- Born: March 28, 1830 Huntsville, Alabama, U.S.
- Died: June 12, 1909 (aged 79) Memphis, Tennessee, U.S.
- Resting place: Forest Hill Cemetery; Memphis, Tennessee, U.S.
- Party: Republican
- Spouse: Charlotte Heywood Blood (m. 1878)
- Occupation: Merchant; politician

William Robert Moore (March 28, 1830 – June 12, 1909), known as Wm. R. Moore, was a U.S. representative from Tennessee, and founder of the William R. Moore College of Technology.

== Biography ==
Moore was born in the hills near Huntsville, Alabama on March 28, 1830, son of Robert Cleveland and Mary F. (Lingow) Moore. Both families were considered aristocratic, and Moore's father traced his ancestry back to Oliver Cromwell. When his father died just six months after Moore's birth, the family was left destitute, and subsequently took up farming. They moved around frequently, eventually landing in the little community of Beech Grove, Tennessee.

When Moore was six years old, the family settled in Fosterville, Rutherford County, Tennessee. He attended the district schools.

== Career ==
Forced to leave school at age 12, Moore went to work as a farm hand. He worked barefoot in the fields for $24 a year with room and board. When the year was over he had saved $12. At the age of fifteen, Moore became a clerk in a dry-goods store in Beech Grove. He was also a clerk in Nashville, Tennessee. He engaged in the wholesale dry-goods business in New York City as a salesman 1856–1859. He married Charlotte Blood, on February 14, 1878. He moved to Memphis, Tennessee in 1859, when he was less than 30 years old, and organized a wholesale dry-goods store, Wm. R. Moore, Inc. Today, this building is listed on the "National Register of Historic Places".

When residing in Memphis, Moore was regarded as the city's "most insulted resident." Opposing secession in the Southern state of Tennessee and also staunchly supporting Republican President Abraham Lincoln, a historian noted:

...he was publicly abused, vilified, and held in contempt. The attack was so severe the Presbyterian congregation of which he was a member threw him out.

— Historian Paul Coppock

During the American Civil War, Moore maintained a low profile and made clever business decisions. Correctly predicting that money in the Confederacy would become of little worth in the likely circumstance that the South lost, he spent his money on downtown property rather than save it. Following the war, when the Union emerged victorious, Moore became a wealthy landowner while rival businessmen faced bankruptcy.

During the yellow fever epidemic of 1879, Moore was among the first to promote a committee on sanitation in Memphis that would improve the city's drinking water system. As a result, breeding grounds for mosquito activities, which caused the plague, were eliminated.

=== U.S. House of Representatives ===
Moore was elected as a Republican to represent Tennessee's 10th District in the Forty-seventh Congress, serving from March 4, 1881, to March 3, 1883. He declined to accept a renomination in 1882, and resumed his business activities.

During his two years in Congress, Moore held a mostly conservative voting record, with the DW-NOMINATE system giving him a score of 0.456 on the first dimension. He was also considered more conservative than 90% of all House members during the congressional session, in addition to being more conservative than 81% of Republicans overall.

Moore declined to run for re-election in the 1882 midterms, instead retiring from the House after one term. He was succeeded by Young.

==== Moore votes against the Pendleton Act ====
Little substantial information is known about Moore's short congressional tenure, though he notably was one of seven House Republicans (along with Benjamin F. Marsh, George W. Steele, John R. Thomas, Orlando Hubbs, James S. Robinson, and Robert Smalls) to vote against the Pendleton Civil Service Reform Act in the lame duck session preceding the 48th Congress.

The Pendleton Act replaced the traditional spoils system with a civil service system, and was favored by Democrats led by George H. Pendleton who resented Republican usage of patronage to benefit blacks. Civil service reform was opposed during the late 1870s by conservative Stalwarts, most of whom ultimately caved into voting for the Pendleton Act following the assassination of James A. Garfield by the mentally ill Charles J. Guiteau.

=== Later career ===
He served as member of the Tennessee state House of Representatives from 1889 to 1891.

On December 9, 1891, Moore gave a tribute to the late president William McKinley, who had been assassinated.

== Death and legacy ==
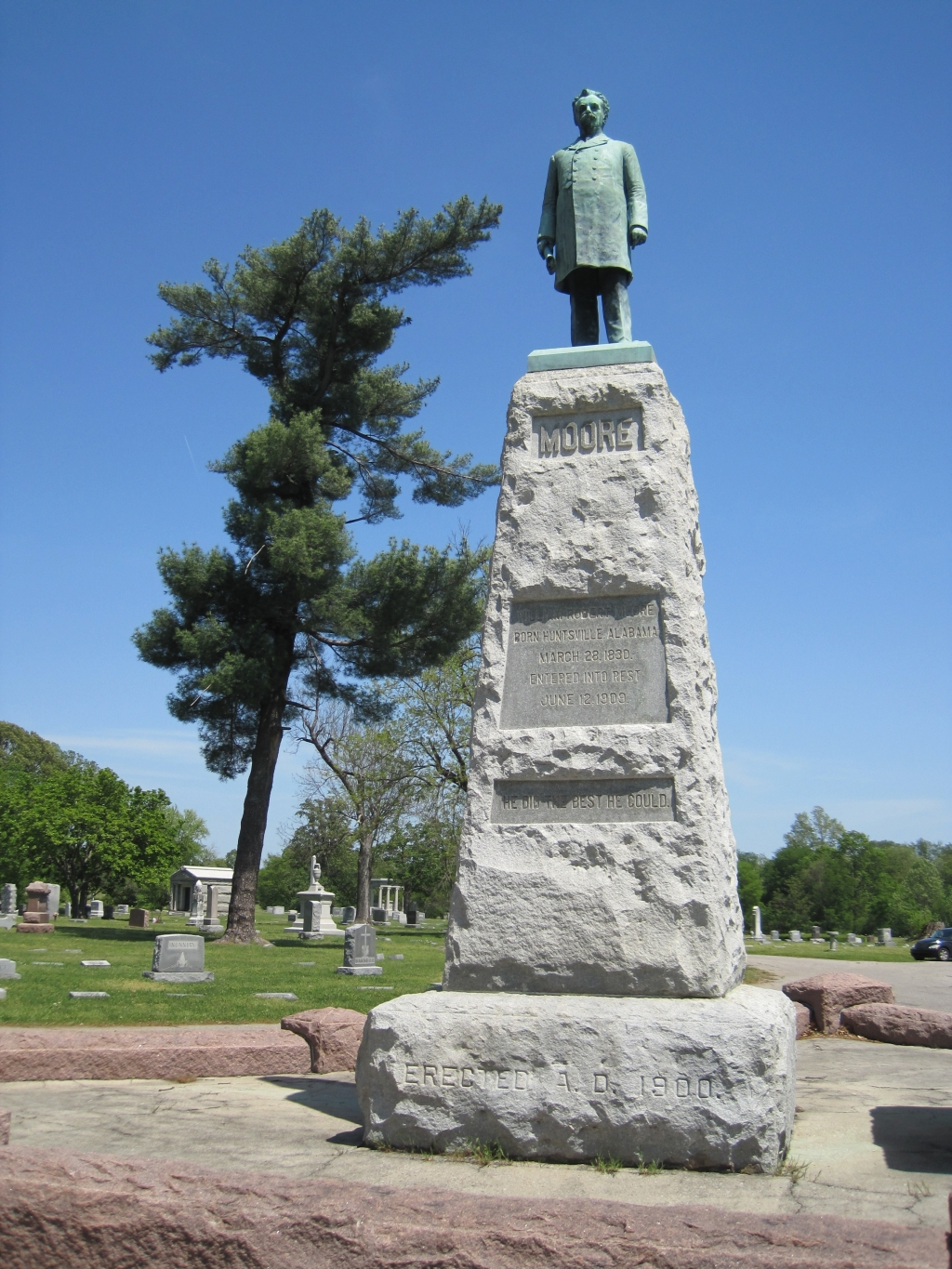
Moore's grave at Forest Hill Cemetery

Moore died in Memphis on June 12, 1909, and is interred at Forest Hill Cemetery in Memphis. His epitaph reads "He did the best he could". He left approximately $500,000 to establish a college. A group of trustees invested the money until there was over a million dollars, and on April 11, 1939, the brand-new William R. Moore School of Technology opened. Perhaps because of his own lack of "book learning" he didn't want an emphasis on liberal arts. The school's first president put it, "He didn't say anything about wanting academic subjects taught. He wanted boys to get training that would enable them to make a good living."

U.S. House of Representatives
Preceded by H. Casey Young	Member of the U.S. House of Representatives from Tennessee's 10th congressional district 1881-1883	Succeeded by H. Casey Young
