= William T. Avery =

American politician (1819–1880)

William Tecumsah Avery
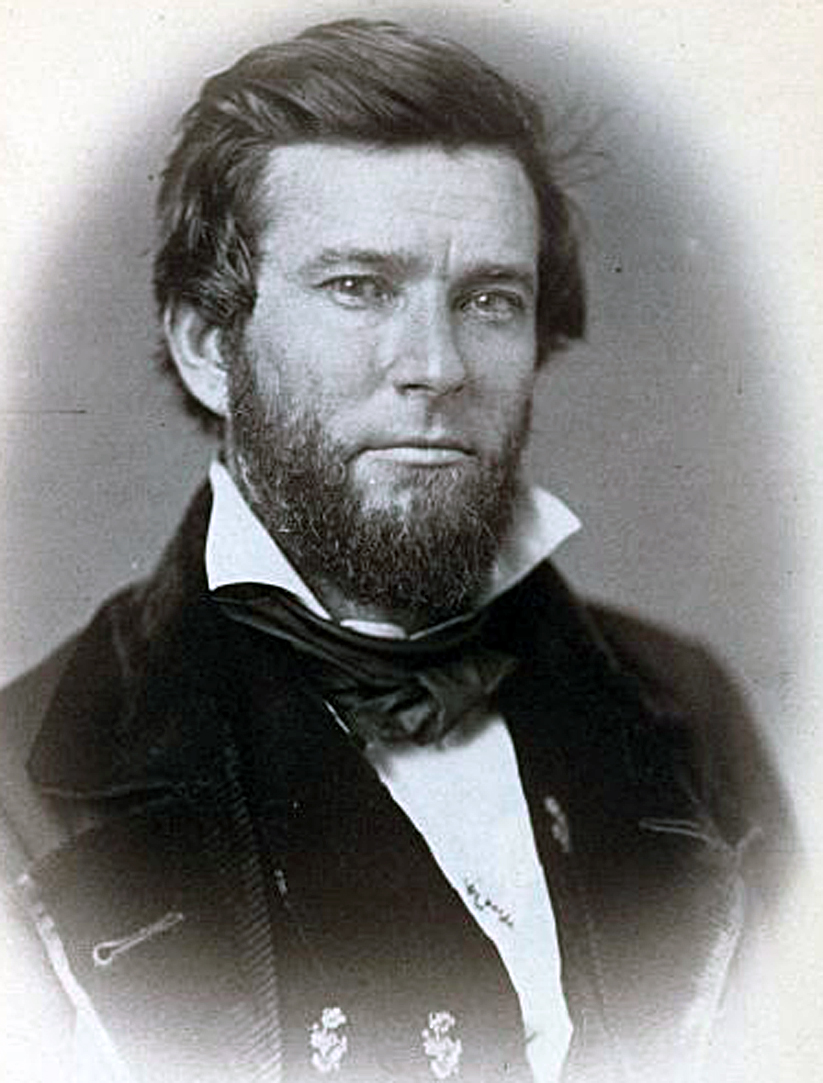

Member of the U.S. House of Representatives from Tennessee's 10th district
- In office March 4, 1857 – March 3, 1861
- Preceded by: Thomas Rivers
- Succeeded by: H. Casey Young

Member of the Tennessee House of Representatives
- In office 1843

Personal details
- Born: November 11, 1819 Hardeman County, Tennessee
- Died: May 20, 1880 (aged 60) Crittenden County, Arkansas
- Party: Democratic
- Spouse: Emma Chastelette Jones
- Children: 3
- Education: Jackson College
- Profession: Lawyer, politician

William Tecumsah "Tom" Avery (November 11, 1819 – May 20, 1880) was an American slave owner, politician, member of the United States House of Representatives for the 10th congressional district of Tennessee, and Confederate Army officer.

== Biography ==
Avery was born in Hardeman County, Tennessee on November 11, 1819, the son of Nathan and Rebecca Jones Rivers Avery. He attended the common schools, graduated from old Jackson College near Columbia, Tennessee in Maury County. He studied law and was admitted to the bar. He moved to Memphis, Tennessee in 1840 and engaged in the practice of law. He married Emma Chastelette Jones in December 1852. They had three children, William Thomas, Harry Edwin, and Emma Blythe.

== Career ==
In 1843, Avery was a member of the Tennessee House of Representatives. He was elected as a Democrat to the Thirty-fifth and Thirty-sixth Congress. He served from March 4, 1857 to March 3, 1861, but he was not a candidate for renomination in 1860.

During the Civil War, Avery served as a lieutenant colonel in the Confederate Army. He was a clerk of the criminal court of Shelby County from 1870 to 1874. He resumed the practice of law in Memphis, Tennessee.

== Death ==
At age 60, Avery accidentally drowned in Ten Mile Bayou in Crittenden County, Arkansas, opposite Memphis, on May 20, 1880. He is interred at Elmwood Cemetery in Memphis, Tennessee.

U.S. House of Representatives
Preceded by Thomas Rivers	Member of the U.S. House of Representatives from Tennessee's 10th congressional district 1857–1861	Succeeded by Civil War
