= Frederick P. Stanton =

American politician (1814–1894)

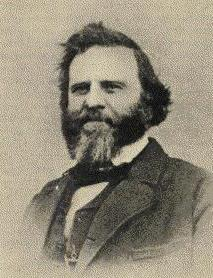

Acting Governor of Kansas Territory
- In office April 15, 1857 – May 27, 1857
- Preceded by: Daniel Woodson (Acting)
- Succeeded by: Robert J. Walker
- In office November 16, 1857 – December 21, 1857
- Preceded by: James W. Denver
- Succeeded by: Samuel Medary

Secretary of Kansas Territory
- In office April 1, 1857 – December 21, 1857
- Preceded by: Daniel Woodson
- Succeeded by: James W. Denver

Chair of the House Judiciary Committee
- In office March 4, 1853 – March 4, 1855
- Preceded by: James X. McLanahan
- Succeeded by: George A. Simmons

Member of the U.S. House of Representatives from Tennessee's 10th district
- In office March 4, 1845 – March 4, 1855
- Preceded by: John B. Ashe
- Succeeded by: Thomas Rivers

Chair of the House Naval Affairs Committee
- In office March 4, 1849 – March 4, 1853
- Preceded by: Thomas Butler King
- Succeeded by: Thomas S. Bocock

Personal details
- Born: Frederick Perry Stanton; December 22, 1814 Alexandria, District of Columbia
- Died: June 4, 1894 (aged 79) Florida
- Party: Democratic (until 1861); Republican (after 1861)
- Parent(s): Richard Stanton; Harriet Perry
- Education: George Washington University

Frederick Perry Stanton (December 22, 1814 – June 4, 1894) was an American lawyer and politician who served in the United States House of Representatives for Tennessee's 10th congressional district and as Secretary (and at times acting governor) of the Kansas Territory.

== Early life and career ==
Stanton was born in Alexandria, District of Columbia (now Virginia) on Dec. 22, 1814, son of Richard and Harriet Perry Stanton and brother of Richard H. Stanton. His father Richard was a soldier in the American Revolutionary War, and afterwards became a bricklayer (a skill that he later taught his son). His elder brother Richard Henry Stanton (1812-1891) would move to Kentucky and also became a U.S. Congressman, serving from 1849 until 1855, and later becoming a state judge. His younger brother Thomas Stanton (1825-1900) would move to Michigan. The family also included brothers John and Richard and four sister, one of whom Jane Perry Gookin, would move to Tennessee with her children and their mother to live with this brother and his family.

=== Education ===
Stanton was taught at an early age by the Quaker teacher Benjamin Hallowell. Stanton subsequently attended Columbian University to study classical studies, and he graduated in 1833 at age 19.

=== Teaching and law careers ===
After graduating, Stanton taught for a while in Virginia, then at a college in North Carolina. At the time, he prepared to enter a Baptist ministry, but instead focused on law.

In 1834, Stanton was admitted to the Tennessee bar and opened a law office in Memphis.

== Career ==
=== House of Representatives ===
Elected as a Democrat to the Twenty-ninth Congress and the four succeeding Congresses, Stanton served from March 4, 1845 to March 3, 1855. After winning his first election, his chagrined Whig opponent shot Stanton in the neck with a pistol. During the Thirty-first and Thirty-second Congresses, he was chairman of the Committee on Naval Affairs, and during the Thirty-third Congress he was chairman of the Committee on the Judiciary.

=== Years in Kansas ===
Stanton served as the governor of Kansas Territory from 1858 to 1861, according to the Biographical Directory of the United States Congress. However, according to the Lecompton Historical Society, he instead served as acting governor from April 15, 1857 to May 27, 1857 and from November 16, 1857 to December 21, 1857. On April 1 of that year, he had been appointed Secretary of Kansas Territory, and he held that office until December 21. He was twice proposed as a United States Senator, the first time in 1859 contingent upon the admission of Kansas under the Lecompton Constitution, the second in 1861 when incumbent senator James H. Lane was offered a commission in the United States Army, but both times no such opportunity materialized.

=== Later life ===
At the beginning of the Civil War Stanton joined the Republican Party. In 1861 he opened a law office in Washington, D. C., for practice in the Supreme Court of the United States. In his later years Stanton was active in efforts for world peace. He was president of the International Peace League, and was a delegate to the Richmond convention in 1882. He was also president of the National Arbitration League of America, and opened its inaugural convention in Washington in 1882. Three years later, Stanton moved to Florida for his health, and resided in that state until his death.

== Death and legacy ==
Stanton died near Ocala, Marion County, Florida on June 4, 1894 (age 79 years, 164 days). He is interred at South Lake Weir Cemetery at South Lake Weir, Florida. A marble bust of Gov. Stanton is among the collections of the Kansas Historical Society.

U.S. House of Representatives
Preceded by John B. Ashe	Member of the U.S. House of Representatives from Tennessee's 10th congressional district 1845–1855	Succeeded by Thomas Rivers
