= W. D. Lyon =

American politician

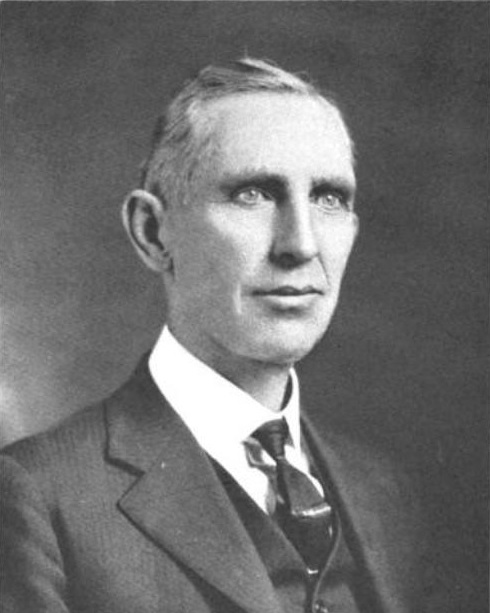

Member of the Tennessee House of Representatives from Sullivan County
- In office January 2, 1905 – January 7, 1907
- Preceded by: W. M. Poe
- Succeeded by: J. Parks Worley
- In office January 7, 1901 – January 5, 1903
- Preceded by: Jack Faw
- Succeeded by: W. M. Poe

Personal details
- Born: William David Lyon; February 21, 1864 Elizabethton, Tennessee, U.S.
- Died: July 30, 1947 (aged 83) Bluff City, Tennessee, U.S.
- Party: Democratic
- Spouse(s): Nannie Eads (m. 1886; died 1921) Effie Cawood (m. 1922; died 1942)

William David Lyon (February 21, 1864 – July 30, 1947) was an American politician who served two terms in the Tennessee House of Representatives.
