= 1932 United States presidential election in Tennessee =

- November 8, 1932

All 11 Tennessee votes to the Electoral College

Nominee	Franklin D. Roosevelt	Herbert Hoover
Party	Democratic	Republican
Home state	New York	California
Running mate	John Nance Garner	Charles Curtis
Electoral vote	11	0
Popular vote	259,473	126,752
Percentage	66.49%	32.48%
County results
Roosevelt
50–60%
60–70%
70–80%
80–90%
90–100%
Hoover
50–60%
60–70%
70–80%
80–90%
President before election
Herbert Hoover
Republican
Elected President
Franklin D. Roosevelt
Democratic

The 1932 United States presidential election in Tennessee took place on November 8, 1932, as part of the 1932 United States presidential election. Tennessee voters chose 11 representatives, or electors, to the Electoral College, who voted for president and vice president.

For over a century after the Civil War, Tennessee was divided according to political loyalties established in that war. Unionist regions covering almost all of East Tennessee, Kentucky Pennyroyal-allied Macon County, and the five West Tennessee Highland Rim counties of Carroll, Henderson, McNairy, Hardin and Wayne voted Republican – generally by landslide margins – as they saw the Democratic Party as the "war party" who had forced them into a war they did not wish to fight. Contrariwise, the rest of Middle and West Tennessee who had supported and driven the state's secession was equally fiercely Democratic as it associated the Republicans with Reconstruction. After the disfranchisement of the state's African-American population by a poll tax was largely complete in the 1890s, the Democratic Party was certain of winning statewide elections if united, although unlike the Deep South Republicans would almost always gain thirty to forty percent of the statewide vote from mountain and Highland Rim support.

The 1920 elections saw a significant but not radical change, whereby by moving into a small number of traditionally Democratic areas in Middle Tennessee and expanding turnout due to the Nineteenth Amendment and powerful isolationist sentiment, the Republican Party was able to capture Tennessee's presidential electoral votes and win the governorship and take three congressional seats in addition to the rock-ribbed GOP First and Second Districts. In 1922 and 1924, with the ebbing of isolationist sympathy and a consequent decline in turnout, the Democratic Party regained Tennessee's governorship and presidential electoral votes; however, in 1928 anti-Catholicism against Democratic nominee Al Smith in this powerfully fundamentalist state meant that Herbert Hoover improved upon Harding's performance, although he failed to gain the down-ballot coattails of 1920.

The Great Depression and the absence of anti-Catholic issues meant that it was universally expected Tennessee would return to Democratic ranks in 1932. This was especially true because, despite a dispute over the Democratic gubernatorial primary that saw runner-up Lewis Pope make a third-party run in the general election, both Pope and primary winner Hill McAlister strongly backed Roosevelt.

On polling day, the campaign managers for Governor Franklin D. Roosevelt (D–New York), running with Speaker John Nance Garner were confident that the Democratic Party would carry the state by at least one hundred thousand votes. Although the campaign managers for incumbent President Hoover were confident he could retain the state, ultimately Roosevelt's campaigns were conservative in their estimation. Tennessee would be won by the Democrat with 66.49 percent of the popular vote, and Hoover would lose with only 32.48 percent. Despite this, the crest of the Blue Ridge and Great Smoky Mountains would be the region showing the most resistance to Roosevelt's appeal in the entire nation: Hoover's 84.51 percent of the vote in Johnson County, although less than the Republican percentage in the previous four elections, would be the highest he received in any county nationwide, whilst Sevier County and Carter County would be Hoover's fifth- and sixth-best nationally.

== Results ==
1932 United States presidential election in Tennessee
Party	Candidate	Votes	%
Democratic	Franklin D. Roosevelt	259,473	66.49%
Republican	Herbert Hoover (inc.)	126,752	32.48%
Prohibition	William David Upshaw	1,998	0.51%
Socialist	Norman Thomas	1,796	0.46%
Communist	William Z. Foster	237	0.06%
Total votes		390,256	100%

=== Results by county ===
1932 United States presidential election in Tennessee by county
County	Franklin D. Roosevelt Democratic		Herbert Hoover Republican		William D. Upshaw Prohibition		Norman Thomas Socialist		William Z. Foster Communist		Margin		Total votes cast
County	#	%	#	%	#	%	#	%	#	%	#	%	Total votes cast
Anderson	1,081	40.08%	1,605	59.51%	9	0.33%	2	0.07%	0	0.00%	-524	-19.43%	2,697
Bedford	2,264	78.12%	630	21.74%	2	0.07%	2	0.07%	0	0.00%	1,634	56.38%	2,898
Benton	1,540	76.20%	455	22.51%	14	0.69%	9	0.45%	3	0.15%	1,085	53.69%	2,021
Bledsoe	1,034	51.86%	960	48.14%	0	0.00%	0	0.00%	0	0.00%	74	3.71%	1,994
Blount	1,515	31.13%	3,275	67.29%	61	1.25%	14	0.29%	2	0.04%	-1,760	-36.16%	4,867
Bradley	1,295	44.62%	1,570	54.10%	24	0.83%	9	0.31%	4	0.14%	-275	-9.48%	2,902
Campbell	1,834	39.79%	2,735	59.34%	22	0.48%	18	0.39%	0	0.00%	-901	-19.55%	4,609
Cannon	1,207	76.63%	360	22.86%	5	0.32%	3	0.19%	0	0.00%	847	53.78%	1,575
Carroll	2,603	50.48%	2,505	48.58%	25	0.48%	15	0.29%	8	0.16%	98	1.90%	5,156
Carter	1,574	23.74%	5,055	76.26%	0	0.00%	0	0.00%	0	0.00%	-3,481	-52.51%	6,629
Cheatham	1,370	87.71%	180	11.52%	3	0.19%	7	0.45%	2	0.13%	1,190	76.18%	1,562
Chester	985	72.59%	356	26.23%	10	0.74%	4	0.29%	2	0.15%	629	46.35%	1,357
Claiborne	3,518	66.82%	1,725	32.76%	16	0.30%	5	0.09%	1	0.02%	1,793	34.06%	5,265
Clay	819	68.48%	361	30.18%	6	0.50%	10	0.84%	0	0.00%	458	38.29%	1,196
Cocke	1,557	39.77%	2,324	59.36%	23	0.59%	7	0.18%	4	0.10%	-767	-19.59%	3,915
Coffee	1,950	81.25%	430	17.92%	13	0.54%	5	0.21%	2	0.08%	1,520	63.33%	2,400
Crockett	1,934	78.39%	513	20.79%	10	0.41%	10	0.41%	0	0.00%	1,421	57.60%	2,467
Cumberland	996	50.71%	957	48.73%	11	0.56%	0	0.00%	0	0.00%	39	1.99%	1,964
Davidson	21,233	74.07%	7,004	24.43%	105	0.37%	300	1.05%	24	0.08%	14,229	49.64%	28,666
Decatur	1,020	62.08%	601	36.58%	10	0.61%	6	0.37%	6	0.37%	419	25.50%	1,643
DeKalb	2,323	60.29%	1,530	39.71%	0	0.00%	0	0.00%	0	0.00%	793	20.58%	3,853
Dickson	2,007	84.33%	369	15.50%	4	0.17%	0	0.00%	0	0.00%	1,638	68.82%	2,380
Dyer	3,805	90.12%	389	9.21%	27	0.64%	1	0.02%	0	0.00%	3,416	80.91%	4,222
Fayette	1,287	95.62%	42	3.12%	12	0.89%	5	0.37%	0	0.00%	1,245	92.50%	1,346
Fentress	961	39.13%	1,383	56.31%	7	0.29%	103	4.19%	2	0.08%	-422	-17.18%	2,456
Franklin	3,029	88.65%	360	10.54%	20	0.59%	6	0.18%	2	0.06%	2,669	78.11%	3,417
Gibson	3,972	84.42%	704	14.96%	19	0.40%	9	0.19%	1	0.02%	3,268	69.46%	4,705
Giles	2,773	81.15%	619	18.12%	9	0.26%	12	0.35%	4	0.12%	2,154	63.04%	3,417
Grainger	995	42.29%	1,325	56.31%	22	0.93%	6	0.25%	5	0.21%	-330	-14.02%	2,353
Greene	4,264	56.61%	3,223	42.79%	35	0.46%	10	0.13%	0	0.00%	1,041	13.82%	7,532
Grundy	978	82.12%	198	16.62%	2	0.17%	10	0.84%	3	0.25%	780	65.49%	1,191
Hamblen	2,032	57.69%	1,458	41.40%	32	0.91%	0	0.00%	0	0.00%	574	16.30%	3,522
Hamilton	11,469	60.56%	7,090	37.44%	132	0.70%	225	1.19%	21	0.11%	4,379	23.12%	18,937
Hancock	551	33.60%	1,089	66.40%	0	0.00%	0	0.00%	0	0.00%	-538	-32.80%	1,640
Hardeman	2,377	88.69%	281	10.49%	16	0.60%	3	0.11%	3	0.11%	2,096	78.21%	2,680
Hardin	806	43.54%	1,036	55.97%	5	0.27%	4	0.22%	0	0.00%	-230	-12.43%	1,851
Hawkins	2,391	45.10%	2,890	54.51%	16	0.30%	5	0.09%	0	0.00%	-499	-9.41%	5,302
Haywood	1,788	95.01%	77	4.09%	16	0.85%	1	0.05%	0	0.00%	1,711	90.91%	1,882
Henderson	958	47.22%	1,058	52.14%	5	0.25%	6	0.30%	2	0.10%	-100	-4.93%	2,029
Henry	2,867	88.08%	340	10.45%	36	1.11%	11	0.34%	1	0.03%	2,527	77.63%	3,255
Hickman	1,812	82.18%	385	17.46%	8	0.36%	0	0.00%	0	0.00%	1,427	64.72%	2,205
Houston	750	86.51%	112	12.92%	3	0.35%	2	0.23%	0	0.00%	638	73.59%	867
Humphreys	1,455	85.44%	231	13.56%	5	0.29%	8	0.47%	4	0.23%	1,224	71.87%	1,703
Jackson	1,726	86.91%	256	12.89%	3	0.15%	1	0.05%	0	0.00%	1,470	74.02%	1,986
Jefferson	975	29.39%	2,275	68.59%	55	1.66%	12	0.36%	0	0.00%	-1,300	-39.19%	3,317
Johnson	425	14.96%	2,400	84.51%	14	0.49%	1	0.04%	0	0.00%	-1,975	-69.54%	2,840
Knox	10,755	51.39%	9,774	46.71%	227	1.08%	171	0.82%	0	0.00%	981	4.69%	20,927
Lake	1,824	95.90%	78	4.10%	0	0.00%	0	0.00%	0	0.00%	1,746	91.80%	1,902
Lauderdale	2,137	90.94%	174	7.40%	18	0.77%	19	0.81%	2	0.09%	1,963	83.53%	2,350
Lawrence	3,240	65.48%	1,684	34.03%	19	0.38%	5	0.10%	0	0.00%	1,556	31.45%	4,948
Lewis	799	85.36%	137	14.64%	0	0.00%	0	0.00%	0	0.00%	662	70.73%	936
Lincoln	3,095	90.26%	288	8.40%	38	1.11%	7	0.20%	1	0.03%	2,807	81.86%	3,429
Loudon	1,629	46.50%	1,817	51.87%	19	0.54%	31	0.88%	7	0.20%	-188	-5.37%	3,503
Macon	885	43.86%	1,123	55.65%	7	0.35%	3	0.15%	0	0.00%	-238	-11.79%	2,018
Madison	4,813	79.83%	1,124	18.64%	65	1.08%	27	0.45%	0	0.00%	3,689	61.19%	6,029
Marion	2,212	61.14%	1,406	38.86%	0	0.00%	0	0.00%	0	0.00%	806	22.28%	3,618
Marshall	2,167	87.73%	283	11.46%	20	0.81%	0	0.00%	0	0.00%	1,884	76.28%	2,470
Maury	3,392	85.83%	535	13.54%	19	0.48%	3	0.08%	3	0.08%	2,857	72.29%	3,952
McMinn	2,630	47.86%	2,790	50.77%	38	0.69%	35	0.64%	2	0.04%	-160	-2.91%	5,495
McNairy	1,961	59.01%	1,350	40.63%	12	0.36%	0	0.00%	0	0.00%	611	18.39%	3,323
Meigs	840	59.66%	564	40.06%	4	0.28%	0	0.00%	0	0.00%	276	19.60%	1,408
Monroe	2,954	65.97%	1,504	33.59%	9	0.20%	9	0.20%	2	0.04%	1,450	32.38%	4,478
Montgomery	2,747	77.47%	799	22.53%	0	0.00%	0	0.00%	0	0.00%	1,948	54.94%	3,546
Moore	923	92.67%	65	6.53%	7	0.70%	1	0.10%	0	0.00%	858	86.14%	996
Morgan	983	44.99%	1,184	54.19%	9	0.41%	9	0.41%	0	0.00%	-201	-9.20%	2,185
Obion	3,183	89.18%	334	9.36%	40	1.12%	12	0.34%	0	0.00%	2,849	79.83%	3,569
Overton	2,231	76.80%	661	22.75%	7	0.24%	4	0.14%	2	0.07%	1,570	54.04%	2,905
Perry	705	78.95%	182	20.38%	3	0.34%	2	0.22%	1	0.11%	523	58.57%	893
Pickett	712	50.28%	681	48.09%	14	0.99%	8	0.56%	1	0.07%	31	2.19%	1,416
Polk	2,540	60.74%	1,642	39.26%	0	0.00%	0	0.00%	0	0.00%	898	21.47%	4,182
Putnam	2,911	69.08%	1,281	30.40%	10	0.24%	7	0.17%	5	0.12%	1,630	38.68%	4,214
Rhea	1,550	51.05%	1,448	47.69%	23	0.76%	10	0.33%	5	0.16%	102	3.36%	3,036
Roane	1,625	43.81%	2,036	54.89%	48	1.29%	0	0.00%	0	0.00%	-411	-11.08%	3,709
Robertson	2,752	90.71%	252	8.31%	19	0.63%	9	0.30%	2	0.07%	2,500	82.40%	3,034
Rutherford	3,924	86.24%	606	13.32%	11	0.24%	9	0.20%	0	0.00%	3,318	72.92%	4,550
Scott	1,025	34.86%	1,890	64.29%	5	0.17%	18	0.61%	2	0.07%	-865	-29.42%	2,940
Sequatchie	777	72.21%	289	26.86%	10	0.93%	0	0.00%	0	0.00%	488	45.35%	1,076
Sevier	887	22.21%	3,075	77.01%	22	0.55%	9	0.23%	0	0.00%	-2,188	-54.80%	3,993
Shelby	38,320	84.76%	6,332	14.01%	96	0.21%	417	0.92%	44	0.10%	31,988	70.76%	45,209
Smith	2,057	77.10%	595	22.30%	9	0.34%	7	0.26%	0	0.00%	1,462	54.80%	2,668
Stewart	1,548	88.76%	184	10.55%	7	0.40%	5	0.29%	0	0.00%	1,364	78.21%	1,744
Sullivan	5,322	63.04%	2,999	35.52%	112	1.33%	2	0.02%	7	0.08%	2,323	27.52%	8,442
Sumner	3,893	90.47%	382	8.88%	20	0.46%	7	0.16%	1	0.02%	3,511	81.59%	4,303
Tipton	2,892	94.23%	154	5.02%	16	0.52%	4	0.13%	3	0.10%	2,738	89.21%	3,069
Trousdale	835	92.78%	64	7.11%	1	0.11%	0	0.00%	0	0.00%	771	85.67%	900
Unicoi	850	33.13%	1,716	66.87%	0	0.00%	0	0.00%	0	0.00%	-866	-33.75%	2,566
Union	802	40.44%	1,169	58.95%	12	0.61%	0	0.00%	0	0.00%	-367	-18.51%	1,983
Van Buren	613	73.59%	196	23.53%	20	2.40%	1	0.12%	3	0.36%	417	50.06%	833
Warren	2,325	84.09%	410	14.83%	21	0.76%	7	0.25%	2	0.07%	1,915	69.26%	2,765
Washington	3,345	46.86%	3,691	51.71%	71	0.99%	31	0.43%	0	0.00%	-346	-4.85%	7,138
Wayne	543	33.13%	1,082	66.02%	6	0.37%	4	0.24%	4	0.24%	-539	-32.89%	1,639
Weakley	3,777	82.52%	783	17.11%	13	0.28%	3	0.07%	1	0.02%	2,994	65.41%	4,577
White	1,938	82.79%	390	16.66%	9	0.38%	4	0.17%	0	0.00%	1,548	66.13%	2,341
Williamson	2,777	89.96%	261	8.45%	23	0.75%	19	0.62%	7	0.23%	2,516	81.50%	3,087
Wilson	2,713	82.26%	567	17.19%	15	0.45%	3	0.09%	0	0.00%	2,146	65.07%	3,298
Totals	259,473	66.48%	126,752	32.48%	1,998	0.51%	1,796	0.46%	254	0.07%	132,721	34.01%	390,273

==== Counties that flipped from Republican to Democratic ====
- Bledsoe
- Campbell
- Carroll
- Claiborne
- Cumberland
- Davison
- DeKalb
- Greene
- Hamblen
- Hamilton
- Houston
- Knox
- Lawrence
- Marion
- McNairy
- Meigs
- Monroe
- Overton
- Pickett
- Polk
- Rhea
- Sullivan

== See also ==
- 1932 Tennessee gubernatorial election
