= 1932 Tennessee gubernatorial election =

- November 8, 1932
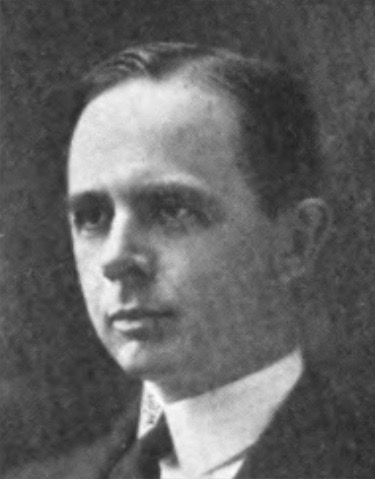

Nominee	Hill McAlister	John McCall	Lewis S. Pope
Party	Democratic	Republican	Independent
Popular vote	169,075	117,797	106,990
Percentage	42.79%	29.75%	27.09%
- County results McAlister: 40–50% 50–60% 60–70% 70–80% McCall: 30–40% 40–50% 50–60% 60–70% 70–80% Pope: 40–50% 50–60% 70–80%
Governor before election
Henry Hollis Horton
Democratic
Elected Governor
Hill McAlister
Democratic

The 1932 Tennessee gubernatorial election was held on November 8, 1932. Democratic nominee Hill McAlister defeated Republican nominee John McCall and Independent nominee Lewis S. Pope with 42.8% of the vote.

In the primary, McAlister's main competitors were Lewis S. Pope and former governor Malcolm R. Patterson. McAlister won the primary by 9,570 votes with Pope getting second. Pope blamed his loss on voter fraud and ran against McAlister in the general election as an Independent.

== Primary elections ==
Primary elections were held on August 4, 1932.

=== Democratic primary ===
==== Candidates ====
- Hill McAlister, Tennessee State Treasurer
- Lewis S. Pope
- Malcolm R. Patterson, former Governor
- Rufus Campbell

==== Results ====
Democratic primary results
Party	Candidate	Votes	%
Democratic	Hill McAlister	116,020	40.92%
Democratic	Lewis S. Pope	106,450	37.54%
Democratic	Malcolm R. Patterson	58,915	20.78%
Democratic	Rufus Campbell	2,181	0.77%
Total votes		283,566	100.00%

== General election ==
=== Candidates ===
Major party candidates

- Hill McAlister, Democratic
- John McCall, Republican

Other candidates

- Lewis S. Pope, Independent
- John H. Compton, Independent
- Charles R. Marlow, Independent

=== Results ===
1932 Tennessee gubernatorial election
Party	Candidate	Votes	%	±%
Democratic	Hill McAlister	169,075	42.75%	
Republican	John McCall	117,797	29.79%	
Independent	Lewis S. Pope	106,990	27.05%	
Independent	John H. Compton	1,277	0.32%	
Independent	Charles R. Marlow	345	0.09%	
Majority		51,278		
Turnout				
Democratic hold		Swing		

== See also ==
- 1932 United States presidential election in Tennessee
