= John Baptista Ashe =

American politician

Member of the U.S. House of Representatives from Tennessee's 10th district
- In office March 4, 1843 – March 3, 1845
- Preceded by: Aaron V. Brown
- Succeeded by: Frederick P. Stanton

Personal details
- Born: 1810 Rocky Point, Pender County, North Carolina
- Died: December 29, 1857 (aged 46–47) Galveston County, Texas
- Party: Whig
- Education: Trinity College, Hartford, Connecticut
- Profession: Lawyer, politician

John Baptista Ashe (1810 – December 29, 1857), was an American lawyer and the nephew of the Revolutionary War veteran John Baptista Ashe, who served as a U.S. Congressman for Tennessee for one term (1843–1845).

== Biography ==
Ashe was born in Rocky Point, Pender County, North Carolina, in 1810. He attended Fayetteville Academy and was in the 1830 class of Trinity College (then called Washington College), Hartford, Connecticut, but for unknown reasons did not receive his diploma until 1844. He studied law and was admitted to the bar in 1832.

== Career ==
Ashe then moved to Tennessee and commenced practice in Brownsville. As of the 1840 census, he owned eight slaves.

He was elected as a Whig to the Twenty-eighth Congress from March 4, 1843 to March 3, 1845, where he voted in favor of the annexation of the slaveholding independent republic of Texas, but did not run for another term, saying he was in ill health After leaving Congress, he moved to Galveston County, Texas, and settled near Galveston to resume his practice of law.

== Death ==
Ashe continued the practice of his chosen profession until his death in Galveston on December 29, 1857 (age about 47 years). He is interred at a cemetery near Galveston.

U.S. House of Representatives
Preceded by Aaron V. Brown	Member of the U.S. House of Representatives from Tennessee's 10th congressional district 1843–1845	Succeeded by Frederick P. Stanton
