= 1908 United States presidential election in Tennessee =

- November 3, 1908
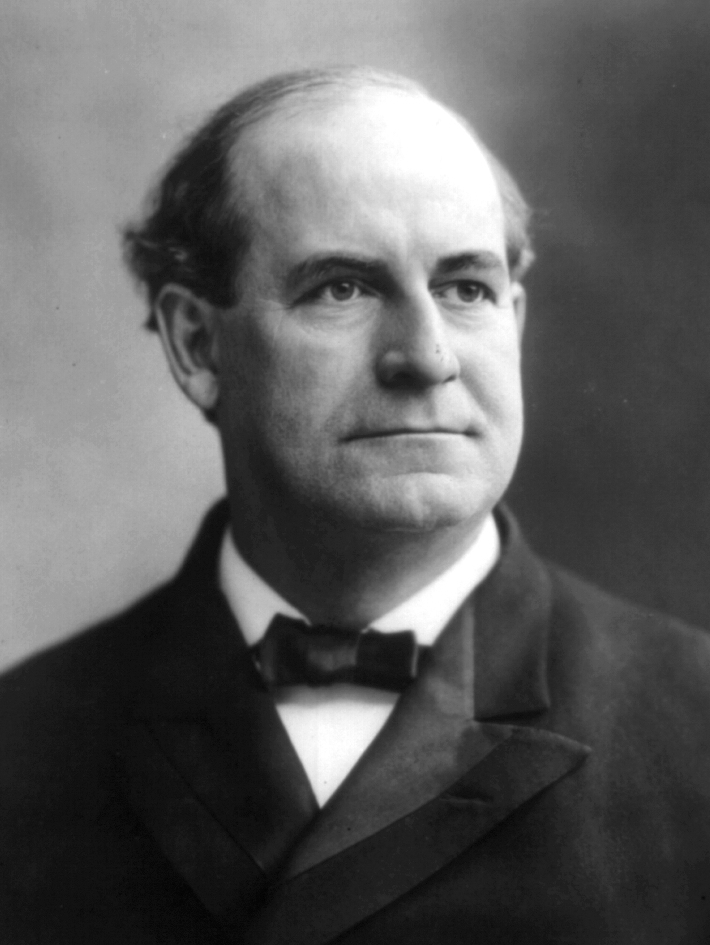

Nominee	William Jennings Bryan	William Howard Taft
Party	Democratic	Republican
Home state	Nebraska	Ohio
Running mate	John W. Kern	James S. Sherman
Electoral vote	12	0
Popular vote	135,608	117,977
Percentage	52.73%	45.87%
County results
Bryan
50–60%
60–70%
70–80%
80–90%
90–100%
Taft
50–60%
60–70%
70–80%
80–90%
90–100%
President before election
Theodore Roosevelt
Republican
Elected President
William Howard Taft
Republican

The 1908 United States presidential election in Tennessee took place on November 3, 1908. All contemporary 46 states were part of the 1908 United States presidential election. Tennessee voters chose 12 electors to the Electoral College, which selected the president and vice president.

For over a century after the Civil War, Tennessee was divided according to political loyalties established in that war. Unionist regions covering almost all of East Tennessee, Kentucky Pennyroyal-allied Macon County, and the five West Tennessee Highland Rim counties of Carroll, Henderson, McNairy, Hardin and Wayne voted Republican – generally by landslide margins – as they saw the Democratic Party as the “war party” who had forced them into a war they did not wish to fight. Contrariwise, the rest of Middle and West Tennessee who had supported and driven the state's secession was equally fiercely Democratic as it associated the Republicans with Reconstruction. After the disfranchisement of the state's African-American population by a poll tax was largely complete in the 1890s, the Democratic Party was certain of winning statewide elections if united, although unlike the Deep South Republicans would almost always gain thirty to forty percent of the statewide vote from mountain and Highland Rim support.

Tennessee was won by the Democratic nominees, former Representative William Jennings Bryan of Nebraska and his running mate John W. Kern of Indiana. They defeated the Republican Party nominees, William Howard Taft and his running mate James S. Sherman of New York. Bryan won the state by a margin of 6.86%.

In October 1908, Taft would in October become the first Republican candidate to tour the South, visiting Tennessee and North Carolina. Aided by opposition by developing manufacturers to Bryan's populism, and by his willingness to accept black disfranchisement, Taft gained noticeably given the extremely deep-rooted partisan loyalties established by the Civil War. Whereas Theodore Roosevelt had lost Tennessee by 10.83 percent in 1904, Taft, although doing worse nationally, lost only by 6.86 percentage points.

Bryan had previously won Tennessee against William McKinley in both 1896 and 1900.

== Results ==
1908 United States presidential election in Tennessee
Party	Candidate	Votes	Percentage	Electoral votes
Democratic	William Jennings Bryan	135,608	52.73%	12
Republican	William Howard Taft	117,977	45.87%	0
Social Democratic	Eugene V. Debs	1,870	0.73%	0
Populist	Thomas E. Watson	1,092	0.42%	0
Independence	Thomas L. Hisgen	332	0.13%	0
Prohibition	Eugene W. Chafin	301	0.12%	0
Totals		257,180	100.00%	12
Voter turnout				—

=== Results by county ===
1908 United States presidential election in Tennessee by county
County	William Jennings Bryan Democratic		William Howard Taft Republican		Eugene V. Debs Socialist		Thomas E. Watson Populist		Various candidates Other parties		Margin		Total votes cast
County	#	%	#	%	#	%	#	%	#	%	#	%	Total votes cast
Anderson	632	23.64%	2,022	75.65%	15	0.56%	2	0.07%	2	0.07%	-1,390	-52.00%	2,673
Bedford	1,996	57.91%	1,446	41.95%	3	0.09%	2	0.06%	0	0.00%	550	15.96%	3,447
Benton	1,221	57.06%	860	40.19%	6	0.28%	53	2.48%	0	0.00%	361	16.87%	2,140
Bledsoe	295	40.75%	425	58.70%	1	0.14%	3	0.41%	0	0.00%	-130	-17.96%	724
Blount	847	24.67%	2,568	74.80%	0	0.00%	0	0.00%	18	0.52%	-1,721	-50.13%	3,433
Bradley	620	36.17%	1,063	62.02%	18	1.05%	9	0.53%	4	0.23%	-443	-25.85%	1,714
Campbell	530	21.99%	1,806	74.94%	30	1.24%	6	0.25%	38	1.58%	-1,276	-52.95%	2,410
Cannon	904	57.18%	672	42.50%	0	0.00%	4	0.25%	1	0.06%	232	14.67%	1,581
Carroll	1,802	43.10%	2,290	54.77%	18	0.43%	71	1.70%	0	0.00%	-488	-11.67%	4,181
Carter	459	12.70%	3,152	87.19%	0	0.00%	0	0.00%	4	0.11%	-2,693	-74.50%	3,615
Cheatham	1,206	69.55%	526	30.33%	2	0.12%	0	0.00%	0	0.00%	680	39.22%	1,734
Chester	703	50.79%	577	41.69%	10	0.72%	94	6.79%	0	0.00%	126	9.10%	1,384
Claiborne	971	36.96%	1,637	62.31%	0	0.00%	14	0.53%	5	0.19%	-666	-25.35%	2,627
Clay	764	54.07%	634	44.87%	4	0.28%	10	0.71%	1	0.07%	130	9.20%	1,413
Cocke	688	27.93%	1,749	71.01%	6	0.24%	11	0.45%	9	0.37%	-1,061	-43.08%	2,463
Coffee	1,654	70.50%	656	27.96%	30	1.28%	1	0.04%	5	0.21%	998	42.54%	2,346
Crockett	1,226	50.43%	1,205	49.57%	0	0.00%	0	0.00%	0	0.00%	21	0.86%	2,431
Cumberland	479	32.17%	1,010	67.83%	0	0.00%	0	0.00%	0	0.00%	-531	-35.66%	1,489
Davidson	8,309	73.98%	2,721	24.23%	157	1.40%	18	0.16%	27	0.24%	5,588	49.75%	11,232
DeKalb	1,284	46.66%	1,464	53.20%	2	0.07%	1	0.04%	1	0.04%	-180	-6.54%	2,752
Decatur	845	46.87%	958	53.13%	0	0.00%	0	0.00%	0	0.00%	-113	-6.27%	1,803
Dickson	1,499	60.76%	899	36.44%	56	2.27%	11	0.45%	2	0.08%	600	24.32%	2,467
Dyer	1,786	71.87%	672	27.04%	20	0.80%	7	0.28%	0	0.00%	1,114	44.83%	2,485
Fayette	1,849	98.88%	4	0.21%	3	0.16%	14	0.75%	0	0.00%	1,835 (Note: In this county where Watson ran second ahead of Taft, margin given is Bryan vote minus Watson vote and percentage margin Bryan percentage minus Watson percentage.)	98.13%	1,870
Fentress	332	26.95%	894	72.56%	6	0.49%	0	0.00%	0	0.00%	-562	-45.62%	1,232
Franklin	2,168	74.71%	716	24.67%	15	0.52%	1	0.03%	2	0.07%	1,452	50.03%	2,902
Gibson	3,173	69.39%	1,369	29.94%	3	0.07%	26	0.57%	2	0.04%	1,804	39.45%	4,573
Giles	3,042	65.87%	1,571	34.02%	0	0.00%	5	0.11%	0	0.00%	1,471	31.85%	4,618
Grainger	673	33.77%	1,309	65.68%	0	0.00%	5	0.25%	6	0.30%	-636	-31.91%	1,993
Greene	1,886	48.08%	2,027	51.67%	1	0.03%	2	0.05%	7	0.18%	-141	-3.59%	3,923
Grundy	576	58.72%	261	26.61%	134	13.66%	10	1.02%	0	0.00%	315	32.11%	981
Hamblen	795	44.34%	991	55.27%	1	0.06%	3	0.17%	3	0.17%	-196	-10.93%	1,793
Hamilton	4,564	50.08%	4,250	46.64%	208	2.28%	12	0.13%	79	0.87%	314	3.45%	9,113
Hancock	370	20.95%	1,396	79.05%	0	0.00%	0	0.00%	0	0.00%	-1,026	-58.10%	1,766
Hardeman	1,568	72.32%	553	25.51%	14	0.65%	33	1.52%	0	0.00%	1,015	46.82%	2,168
Hardin	720	37.72%	1,132	59.30%	9	0.47%	42	2.20%	6	0.31%	-412	-21.58%	1,909
Hawkins	1,152	40.49%	1,693	59.51%	0	0.00%	0	0.00%	0	0.00%	-541	-19.02%	2,845
Haywood	1,215	84.91%	189	13.21%	27	1.89%	0	0.00%	0	0.00%	1,026	71.70%	1,431
Henderson	900	43.48%	1,148	55.46%	0	0.00%	0	0.00%	22	1.06%	-248	-11.98%	2,070
Henry	2,369	68.15%	1,069	30.75%	18	0.52%	10	0.29%	10	0.29%	1,300	37.40%	3,476
Hickman	1,285	54.15%	1,065	44.88%	18	0.76%	4	0.17%	1	0.04%	220	9.27%	2,373
Houston	665	68.00%	288	29.45%	25	2.56%	0	0.00%	0	0.00%	377	38.55%	978
Humphreys	1,301	65.25%	679	34.05%	14	0.70%	0	0.00%	0	0.00%	622	31.19%	1,994
Jackson	1,404	59.14%	966	40.69%	2	0.08%	2	0.08%	0	0.00%	438	18.45%	2,374
James	217	26.27%	608	73.61%	1	0.12%	0	0.00%	0	0.00%	-391	-47.34%	826
Jefferson	662	25.00%	1,962	74.09%	0	0.00%	4	0.15%	20	0.76%	-1,300	-49.09%	2,648
Johnson	232	9.74%	2,148	90.21%	0	0.00%	0	0.00%	1	0.04%	-1,916	-80.47%	2,381
Knox	4,090	39.77%	5,817	56.56%	159	1.55%	39	0.38%	180	1.75%	-1,727	-16.79%	10,285
Lake	464	71.27%	178	27.34%	9	1.38%	0	0.00%	0	0.00%	286	43.93%	651
Lauderdale	1,315	70.85%	519	27.96%	22	1.19%	0	0.00%	0	0.00%	796	42.89%	1,856
Lawrence	1,591	47.78%	1,725	51.80%	12	0.36%	0	0.00%	2	0.06%	-134	-4.02%	3,330
Lewis	465	56.64%	354	43.12%	2	0.24%	0	0.00%	0	0.00%	111	13.52%	821
Lincoln	2,311	75.03%	692	22.47%	4	0.13%	64	2.08%	9	0.29%	1,619	52.56%	3,080
Loudon	444	30.62%	986	68.00%	5	0.34%	5	0.34%	10	0.69%	-542	-37.38%	1,450
Macon	684	29.67%	1,594	69.15%	3	0.13%	24	1.04%	0	0.00%	-910	-39.48%	2,305
Madison	2,409	61.98%	1,357	34.91%	45	1.16%	75	1.93%	1	0.03%	1,052	27.06%	3,887
Marion	842	43.18%	1,074	55.08%	29	1.49%	3	0.15%	2	0.10%	-232	-11.90%	1,950
Marshall	1,544	74.77%	440	21.31%	4	0.19%	71	3.44%	6	0.29%	1,104	53.46%	2,065
Maury	2,324	77.91%	620	20.78%	11	0.37%	22	0.74%	6	0.20%	1,704	57.12%	2,983
McMinn	926	40.90%	1,320	58.30%	0	0.00%	13	0.57%	5	0.22%	-394	-17.40%	2,264
McNairy	1,057	44.10%	1,300	54.23%	0	0.00%	37	1.54%	3	0.13%	-243	-10.14%	2,397
Meigs	464	50.16%	457	49.41%	0	0.00%	4	0.43%	0	0.00%	7	0.76%	925
Monroe	1,406	43.38%	1,827	56.37%	8	0.25%	0	0.00%	0	0.00%	-421	-12.99%	3,241
Montgomery	2,961	60.17%	1,903	38.67%	17	0.35%	28	0.57%	12	0.24%	1,058	21.50%	4,921
Moore	677	86.35%	103	13.14%	0	0.00%	3	0.38%	1	0.13%	574	73.21%	784
Morgan	496	28.54%	1,236	71.12%	1	0.06%	0	0.00%	5	0.29%	-740	-42.58%	1,738
Obion	2,258	75.52%	711	23.78%	10	0.33%	0	0.00%	11	0.37%	1,547	51.74%	2,990
Overton	1,401	56.63%	1,008	40.74%	65	2.63%	0	0.00%	0	0.00%	393	15.89%	2,474
Perry	756	52.28%	678	46.89%	12	0.83%	0	0.00%	0	0.00%	78	5.39%	1,446
Pickett	391	43.06%	517	56.94%	0	0.00%	0	0.00%	0	0.00%	-126	-13.88%	908
Polk	747	38.87%	1,175	61.13%	0	0.00%	0	0.00%	0	0.00%	-428	-22.27%	1,922
Putnam	1,632	53.35%	1,419	46.39%	5	0.16%	0	0.00%	3	0.10%	213	6.96%	3,059
Rhea	883	46.74%	995	52.67%	4	0.21%	2	0.11%	5	0.26%	-112	-5.93%	1,889
Roane	595	26.23%	1,524	67.20%	113	4.98%	18	0.79%	18	0.79%	-929	-40.96%	2,268
Robertson	2,418	75.85%	755	23.68%	6	0.19%	7	0.22%	2	0.06%	1,663	52.16%	3,188
Rutherford	2,764	69.27%	1,226	30.73%	0	0.00%	0	0.00%	0	0.00%	1,538	38.55%	3,990
Scott	190	8.85%	1,932	89.99%	25	1.16%	0	0.00%	0	0.00%	-1,742	-81.14%	2,147
Sequatchie	394	61.28%	249	38.72%	0	0.00%	0	0.00%	0	0.00%	145	22.55%	643
Sevier	291	8.50%	3,130	91.44%	2	0.06%	0	0.00%	0	0.00%	-2,839	-82.94%	3,423
Shelby	7,411	68.90%	3,069	28.53%	239	2.22%	14	0.13%	23	0.21%	4,342	40.37%	10,756
Smith	1,638	59.13%	1,056	38.12%	0	0.00%	69	2.49%	7	0.25%	582	21.01%	2,770
Stewart	1,475	64.49%	715	31.26%	97	4.24%	0	0.00%	0	0.00%	760	33.23%	2,287
Sullivan	2,393	56.16%	1,836	43.09%	2	0.05%	11	0.26%	19	0.45%	557	13.07%	4,261
Sumner	2,343	76.97%	673	22.11%	11	0.36%	12	0.39%	5	0.16%	1,670	54.86%	3,044
Tipton	1,662	60.99%	1,041	38.20%	3	0.11%	18	0.66%	1	0.04%	621	22.79%	2,725
Trousdale	476	70.00%	198	29.12%	0	0.00%	6	0.88%	0	0.00%	278	40.88%	680
Unicoi	67	7.23%	860	92.77%	0	0.00%	0	0.00%	0	0.00%	-793	-85.54%	927
Union	496	22.72%	1,684	77.14%	3	0.14%	0	0.00%	0	0.00%	-1,188	-54.42%	2,183
Van Buren	329	64.64%	176	34.58%	4	0.79%	0	0.00%	0	0.00%	153	30.06%	509
Warren	1,573	67.51%	729	31.29%	19	0.82%	2	0.09%	7	0.30%	844	36.22%	2,330
Washington	1,574	41.04%	2,254	58.77%	4	0.10%	1	0.03%	2	0.05%	-680	-17.73%	3,835
Wayne	451	24.21%	1,411	75.74%	0	0.00%	0	0.00%	1	0.05%	-960	-51.53%	1,863
Weakley	2,976	61.42%	1,812	37.40%	17	0.35%	29	0.60%	11	0.23%	1,164	24.02%	4,845
White	1,572	64.88%	835	34.46%	16	0.66%	0	0.00%	0	0.00%	737	30.42%	2,423
Williamson	1,928	75.28%	605	23.62%	5	0.20%	23	0.90%	0	0.00%	1,323	51.66%	2,561
Wilson	2,212	70.99%	902	28.95%	0	0.00%	2	0.06%	0	0.00%	1,310	42.04%	3,116
Totals	135,604	52.73%	117,977	45.87%	1,870	0.73%	1,092	0.42%	633	0.25%	17,627	6.85%	257,176

== See also ==
- 1908 Tennessee gubernatorial election
- United States presidential elections in Tennessee
