= Anna Lee Keys Worley =

American politician

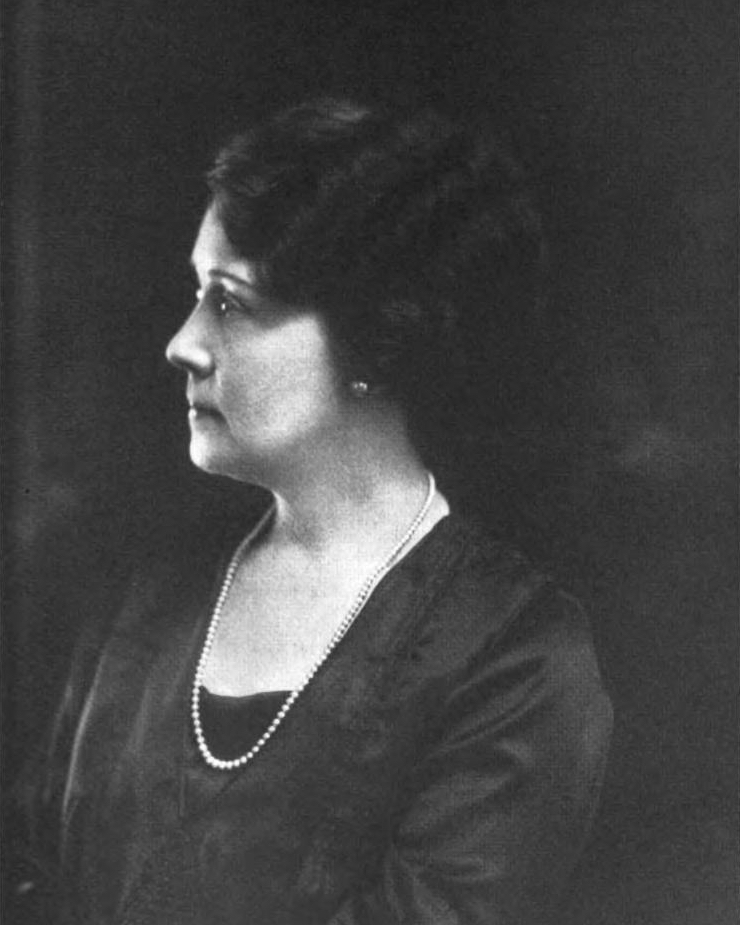

Member of the Tennessee Senate from the 2nd district
- In office February 8, 1921 – January 1, 1923
- Preceded by: J. Parks Worley
- Succeeded by: D. A. Barger

Personal details
- Born: Anna Lee Keys; 1872 Boswell, Indiana, U.S.
- Died: May 3, 1961 (aged 89) Lafayette, Indiana, U.S.
- Party: Democratic
- Spouse: James Parks Worley (m. 1907; died 1921)

Anna Lee Keys Worley (1872 – May 2, 1961) was the first woman elected to the Tennessee Senate, representing Sullivan and Hawkins counties.

She was born Anna Lee Keys to William T. and Sarah (née Evans) Keys in Boswell, Indiana, in 1872. She married Tennessee state representative J. Parks Worley on November 25, 1907. Parks was elevated to the state senate in 1913 and served until his death on January 6, 1921.

Worley was elected as a Democrat in the January 25, 1921, special election to succeed her husband and was sworn in on February 8.

One historian wrote that Worley "succeeded her antisuffragist husband in the Tennessee state senate and promptly used her powers to sponsor legislation to remove civil disabilities against Tennessee's women".

Worley left the Senate in 1923 after serving one term. She died on May 2, 1961, in Lafayette, Indiana.
