= J. Parks Worley =

American politician

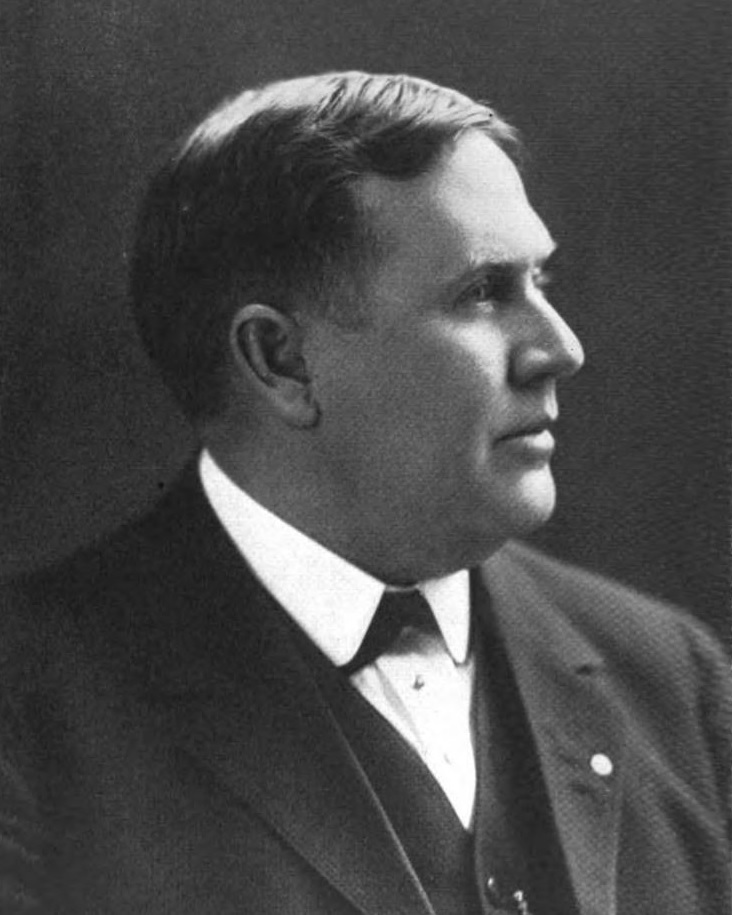

Member of the Tennessee Senate from the 2nd district
- In office January 6, 1913 – January 6, 1921
- Preceded by: John I. Cox
- Succeeded by: Anna Lee Keys Worley

Member of the Tennessee House of Representatives from Sullivan County
- In office January 7, 1907 – January 6, 1913
- Preceded by: W. D. Lyon
- Succeeded by: John I. Cox

Personal details
- Born: James Parks Worley; November 5, 1873 Bluff City, Tennessee, U.S.
- Died: January 6, 1921 (aged 47) Nashville, Tennessee, U.S.
- Party: Democratic
- Spouse: Anna Lee Keys (m. 1907)
- Education: Emory & Henry College

James Parks Worley (November 5, 1873 – January 6, 1921) was an American politician who served in both houses of the Tennessee General Assembly.
