= Ellendale, Tennessee =

- Unincorporated community
- Location within Tennessee Location within the United States
- Coordinates: 35°13′50″N 89°49′33″W
- Country: United States
- State: Tennessee
- County: Shelby
- Elevation: 305 ft (93 m)
- Time zone: UTC-6 (Central (CST))
  - Summer (DST): UTC-5 (CDT)
- ZIP code: 38029
- Area code: 901
- GNIS feature ID: 1283661

Ellendale is an unincorporated community in Shelby County, Tennessee, United States, in the Memphis metropolitan area.

== History ==
The first railroad to Shelby County was the Memphis & Ohio Railroad, stretching from Memphis to Paris, Tennessee in 1856. In 1872, the Louisville & Nashville, or L&N Railroad, bought the Memphis & Ohio Railroad and sponsored a contest to rename the community near Bond's Station depot. "Ellendale" was chosen as a play-on-words of the abbreviation L&N. According to a source, it appears that Ellendale was eventually annexed by Bartlett in 1977.

== Location ==
Ellendale appears on the United States Geological Survey map, bordered on the north by the community of Brunswick, on the west by the neighborhood of Raleigh, on the south by the city of Bartlett, and on the east by the city of Lakeland.

Ellendale has a post office with ZIP code 38029.

== Demographics ==
Ellendale has a population of 25,882 with a density of 2,051 per square mile. The median age is 35.
