= William Marshall Inge =

American politician

Member of the U.S. House of Representatives from Tennessee's 10th district
- In office March 4, 1833 – March 3, 1835
- Preceded by: District created
- Succeeded by: Ebenezer J. Shields

Member of the Alabama House of Representatives
- In office 1840; 1844-1845

Personal details
- Born: 1802 Granville County, North Carolina
- Died: 1846 (aged 43–44) Livingston, Alabama
- Party: Jacksonian
- Relatives: Pete Buttigieg 4th great-grandson
- Profession: lawyer; politician

William Marshall Inge (1802–1846) was an American politician who represented Tennessee's tenth district in the United States House of Representatives in the 23rd Congress.

== Biography ==
Inge was born in Granville County, North Carolina in 1802. His parents were Richard Inge Sr., a Revolutionary War soldier, and Sally Johnson. He attended the schools of North Carolina, moved to Tennessee, and continued his schooling. He studied law, was admitted to the bar, and practiced law.

== Career ==
William Marshall Inge's career included work as a lawyer, a Superior Court Judge, a state politician (in both Tennessee and Alabama), and a national politician. He was a member of the Tennessee House of Representatives from 1828 - 1833. He was then elected as a Jacksonian to the Twenty-third Congress, which lasted from March 4, 1833 to March 3, 1835. He served as a Tennessee congressman alongside future U.S. President James Polk and frontiersman Davy Crockett.

Having moved to Livingston, Alabama in 1836, Inge resumed the practice of his profession. He was a member of the Alabama House of Representatives in 1840, 1844, and 1845. While a member of the Alabama House of Representatives, he argued against the death penalty.

== Personal life ==
He married Susan Marr of Fayetteville, Tennessee. They had six children: Sally, Mary Turner (she married John T. Loudon who served with an Arkansas Union Infantry regiment during the Civil War), Eliza Jane, John, Susan, and William Jr.

== Death ==
Inge died of heart disease in Livingston, Alabama in 1846 and is interred at Livingston Cemetery. He was the uncle of U.S. Representative Samuel Williams Inge.

U.S. House of Representatives
| Preceded by District created | Member of the U.S. House of Representatives from Tennessee's 10th congressional district 1833–1835 | Succeeded by Ebenezer J. Shields |
