= W. M. Poe =

American politician

Member of the Tennessee House of Representatives from Sullivan County
- In office January 5, 1903 – January 2, 1905
- Preceded by: W. D. Lyon
- Succeeded by: W. D. Lyon

Personal details
- Born: William Milburn Poe; January 20, 1847
- Died: September 14, 1913 (aged 66) Piney Flats, Tennessee, U.S.
- Party: Democratic
- Spouse(s): Mary White; Ida Clay

William Milburn Poe (January 20, 1847 – September 14, 1913) was an American politician who served in the Tennessee House of Representatives.
