= Edward W. Carmack =

American politician (1858–1908)

Edward Carmack
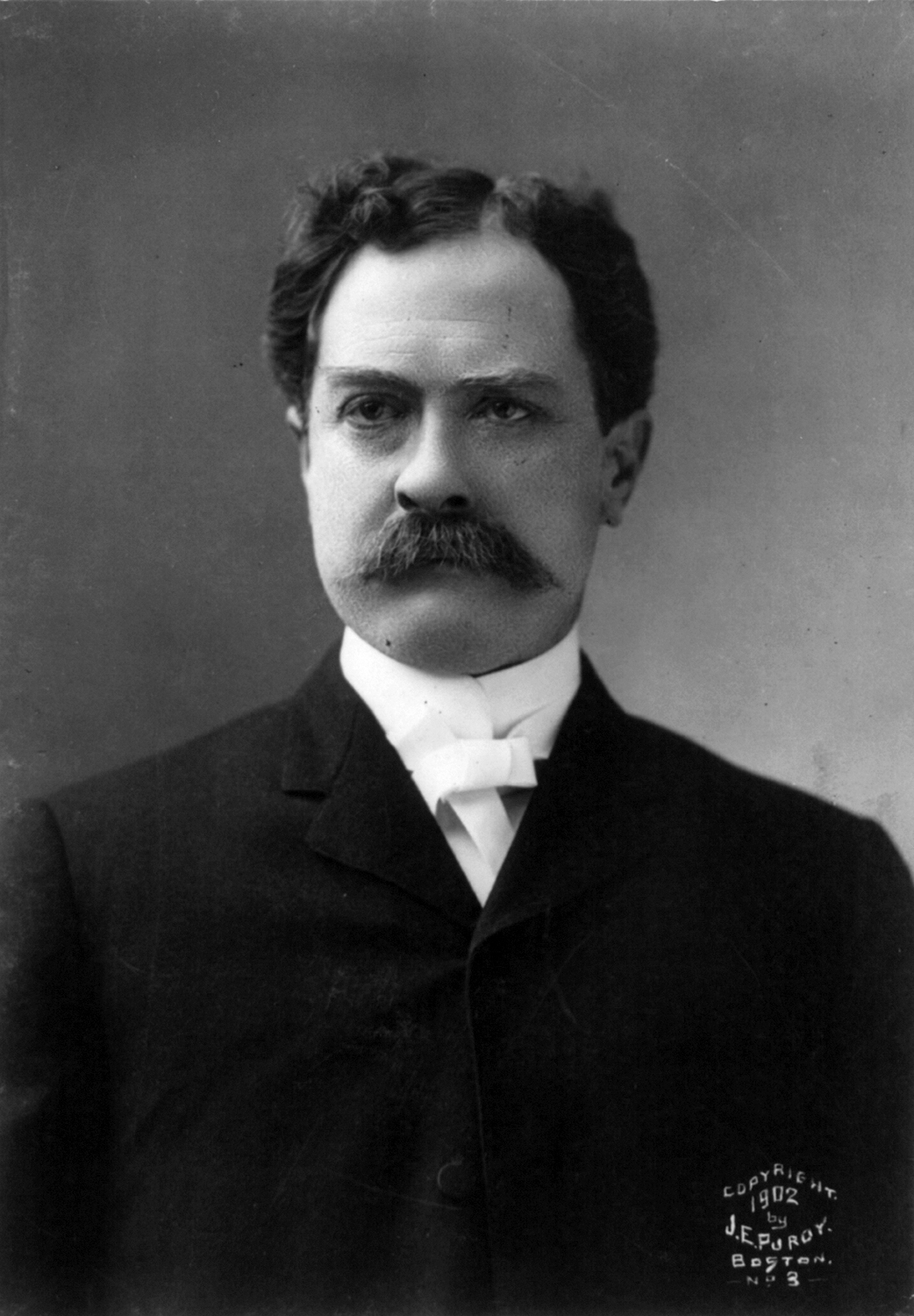

Secretary of the Senate Democratic Caucus
- In office March 6, 1903 – March 3, 1907
- Leader: Arthur Pue Gorman; Joseph Clay Stiles Blackburn
- Preceded by: Position established
- Succeeded by: Robert Latham Owen

United States Senator from Tennessee
- In office March 4, 1901 – March 3, 1907
- Preceded by: Thomas B. Turley
- Succeeded by: Robert Taylor

Member of the U.S. House of Representatives from Tennessee's 10th district
- In office March 4, 1897 – March 3, 1901
- Preceded by: Josiah Patterson
- Succeeded by: Malcolm R. Patterson

Personal details
- Born: Edward Ward Carmack; November 5, 1858 Castalian Springs, Tennessee, U.S.
- Died: November 9, 1908 (aged 50) Nashville, Tennessee, U.S.
- Party: Democratic

Edward Ward Carmack (November 5, 1858 – November 9, 1908) was an attorney, newspaperman, and political figure who served as a U.S. senator from Tennessee from 1901 to 1907.

Following his political service, and after an unsuccessful run for Governor of Tennessee, he became editor of the one-year-old Nashville Tennessean. He was fatally shot on November 9, 1908, over a feud precipitated by Duncan Brown Cooper for his editorial comments in the paper.

== Early life ==
Carmack was born in Sumner County, Tennessee. He attended The Webb School, then at Culleoka, Tennessee. He studied law and was admitted to the bar in 1878 and began practicing in Columbia, Tennessee. He served as Columbia city attorney in 1881, and was elected to the Tennessee House of Representatives in 1884.

Carmack joined the staff of the Nashville Democrat in 1889, later becoming editor-in-chief of the Nashville American when the two papers merged. He later (1892) served as editor of the Memphis Commercial, now The Commercial Appeal.

== Relationship with Ida B. Wells ==
Throughout his career, Carmack was known to use his newspapers to attack rivals. During Carmack's tenure with the Appeal, his editorials began an interesting dialogue with another famous Tennessee journalist, Ida B. Wells. Wells, known as the "Mother of the Civil Rights Movement", was also not one to withhold her opinions and spoke out about the plight of African Americans in the post-Reconstruction era in the South. Memphis in the 1890s was a hotbed of racial tension, and lynching crimes were commonplace. Wells launched an anti-lynching campaign in her newspaper, Memphis Free Speech and Headlight.

The Free Speech and Headlight received national attention in 1892 for its coverage of the so-called Curve Riot in Memphis. The Curve Riot was not in fact a riot, it was an attack on the People's Grocery Store by a group of undercover white police serving a warrant on the black-owned business. Will Barret, the store's white competitor, had convinced a local court that the People's Grocery was a nuisance. The court ordered the owners arrested. Fearing an attack, supporters of the People's Grocery armed themselves to defend the store. In the ensuing melee, three deputies were wounded. Crying "race riot," other armed whites joined the police and captured over thirty African Americans, including three of the store's owners: Tom Moss, Calvin McDowell, and Will Stewart.

A mob later seized the three from the jail and lynched them. Wells wrote passionately of the atrocity and advised her readers to abandon Memphis and move to the western territories. Many followed her advice. Carmack demanded retaliation against "the black wench" for her denunciation of the lynchings. As a result, the offices of the Free Speech were demolished. Fortunately, Wells was out of town when the attack occurred. She did not return to the South for another thirty years.

== Political career ==
Carmack was elected to the United States House of Representatives in 1896, and served two terms in that body, March 4, 1897 – March 3, 1901. He was then elected to the U.S. Senate by the Tennessee General Assembly, serving one term in that body, March 4, 1901 – March 3, 1907. Carmack served on the Lodge Committee investigating war crimes in the Philippine–American War.

Carmack failed to secure reelection to a second Senate term, being succeeded by former governor of Tennessee Robert Love Taylor, and returned to the practice of law. He then contended for the 1908 Democratic nomination for governor, running against the incumbent, Malcolm Patterson. Carmack ran as a Prohibitionist, while Patterson had the support of the "wet" lobby. Narrowly defeated by Patterson, Carmack returned to journalism, becoming the editor of the Nashville Tennessean, then a prohibitionist daily.

== Death and legacy ==
On November 9, 1908, Carmack attempted to shoot his publishing and political rival, Duncan Brown Cooper, attempting to act preemptively after Cooper threatened him over the content of anti-Cooper editorials Carmack had published. Carmack missed Cooper but wounded Cooper's son Robin, who returned fire and killed Carmack.

Carmack's remains were returned to Columbia, and he was buried in its Rose Hill Cemetery.

Perhaps in large measure because of the spectacular and violent nature of his death, Carmack was memorialized by the Tennessee state legislature. They commissioned a large bronze statue of Carmack, which was erected on the grounds of the Tennessee State Capitol building and stood there until May 2020. The bronze statue was designed by Nancy Cox-McCormack in 1924 (dedicated in 1927), and engraved with several quotes from Carmack on its surroundings and pedestal.

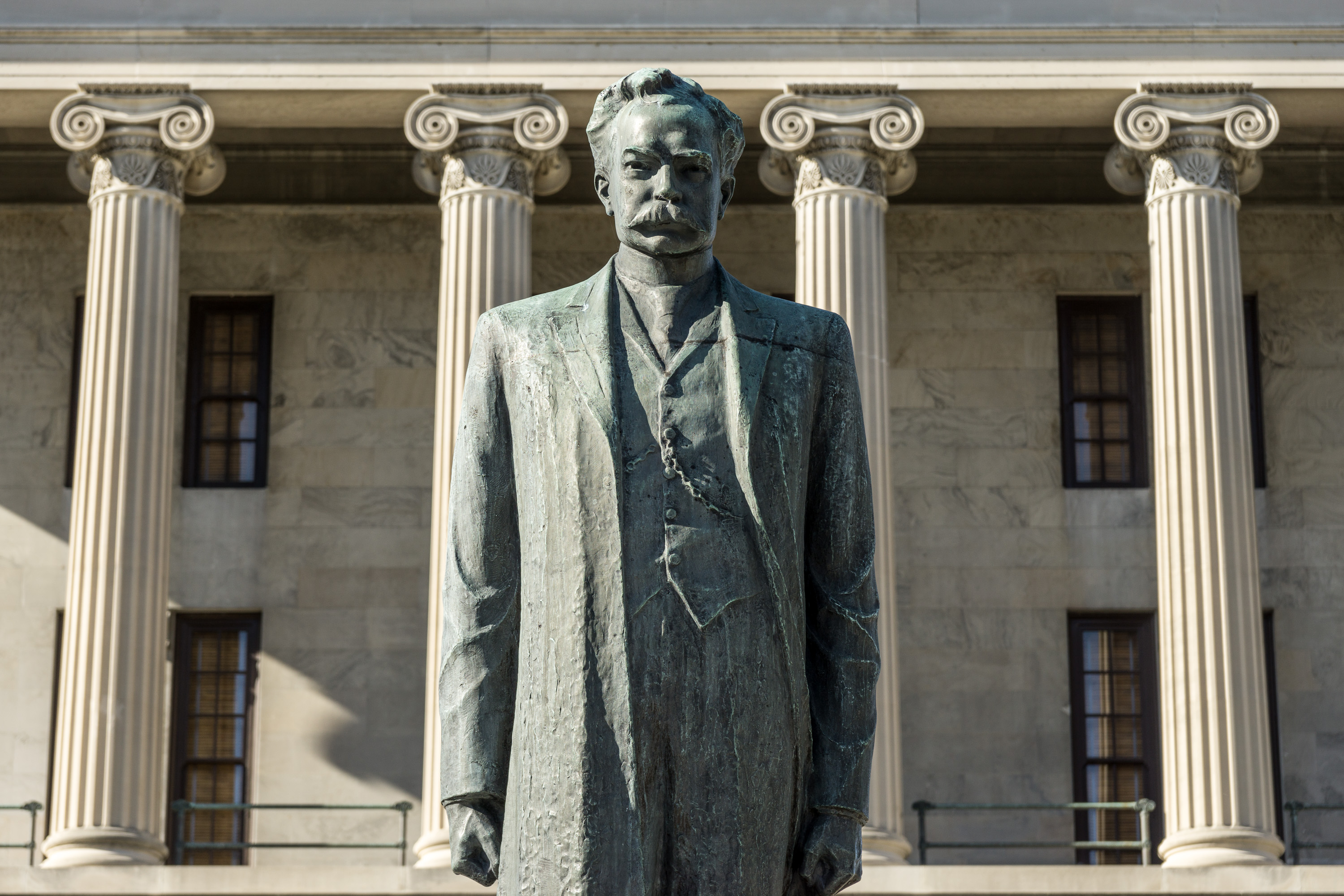
A statue of Carmack used to stand in front of the Tennessee State Capitol, Nashville, Tennessee

Because of Carmack's support for lynching, the statue has long caused tension in Nashville. A commission suggested replacing Carmack's statue with one of Davy Crockett. The Carmack statue was torn down by George Floyd protesters on May 30, 2020.

For many years the public library on Hartsville Pike (State Route 25) in Gallatin, Tennessee, was named in his honor. When a new public library was opened in 2008 in downtown Gallatin, local authorities decided against naming it for him. There still remains a street in Columbia, Tennessee, named in his honor.

== See also ==
- List of journalists killed in the United States
- Censorship in the United States

U.S. House of Representatives
| Preceded by Josiah Patterson | Member of the U.S. House of Representatives from Tennessee's 10th congressional district 1897–1901 | Succeeded by Malcolm R. Patterson |
U.S. Senate
| Preceded by Thomas B. Turley | U.S. Senator (Class 2) from Tennessee; 1901–1907; Served alongside: William B. Bate, James B. Frazier | Succeeded by Robert Taylor |
Party political offices
| New office | Secretary of the Senate Democratic Caucus; 1903–1907 | Succeeded by Robert Latham Owen |
