= 1896 United States presidential election in Tennessee =

- November 3, 1896

Nominee	William Jennings Bryan	William McKinley
Party	Democratic	Republican
Alliance	Populist
Home state	Nebraska	Ohio
Running mate	Arthur Sewall	Garret Hobart
Electoral vote	12	0
Popular vote	167,168	148,683
Percentage	52.09%	46.33%
County results
Bryan
50–60%
60–70%
70–80%
80–90%
McKinley
40–50%
50–60%
60–70%
70–80%
80–90%
President before election
Grover Cleveland
Democratic
Elected President
William McKinley
Republican

The 1896 United States presidential election in Tennessee took place on November 3, 1896. All contemporary 45 states were part of the 1896 United States presidential election. Tennessee voters chose 12 electors to the Electoral College, which selected the president and vice president.

For over a century after the Civil War, Tennessee’s white citizenry was divided according to partisan loyalties established in that war. Unionist regions covering almost all of East Tennessee, Kentucky Pennyroyal-allied Macon County, and the five West Tennessee Highland Rim counties of Carroll, Henderson, McNairy, Hardin and Wayne voted Republican – generally by landslide margins – as they saw the Democratic Party as the “war party” who had forced them into a war they did not wish to fight. Contrariwise, the rest of Middle and West Tennessee who had supported and driven the state's secession was equally fiercely Democratic as it associated the Republicans with Reconstruction. After the state's white landowning class re-established its rule in the early 1870s, black and Unionist white combined to forge adequate support for the GOP to produce a competitive political system for two decades, although during this era the Republicans could only capture statewide offices when the Democratic Party was divided on this issue of payment of state debt.

White Democrats in West Tennessee were always aiming to eliminate black political influence, which they first attempted to do by election fraud in the middle 1880s and did so much more successfully at the end of that decade by instituting in counties with significant black populations a secret ballot that prevented illiterates voting, and a poll tax throughout the state, which cut turnout by at least a third in the 1890s. This poll tax was supposedly relaxed or paid by party officials in Unionist Republican areas, where whites were much poorer than in secessionist areas.

The mid-1890s Populist movement did not affect Tennessee so much as other southern states, with the party never cracking 12 percent in any biennial gubernatorial election. Although the state's poll tax had already reduced the Republican black and poor white electorate, Democratic managers were unsure about carrying Tennessee in late October, because it was felt that urban businessmen would desert the party in sufficient numbers for McKinley to come close to carrying the state. Polls the day before the election suggested Tennessee would be exceedingly close, but as it turned out Bryan would carry the state relatively easily by nearly six points, which was still a decline upon recent Democratic performances despite a quantitatively reduced Republican electorate.

Tennessee would be won by the Democratic and Populist nominees, former Representative of Nebraska William Jennings Bryan and his running mate Arthur Sewall of Maine. They defeated the Republican nominees, former Ohio Governor William McKinley and his running mate Garret Hobart of New Jersey. Bryan won the state by a margin of 5.76%.

Bryan would later win Tennessee against McKinley again four years later and would later win the state again in 1908 against William Howard Taft.

== Results ==
1896 United States presidential election in Tennessee
Party	Candidate	Votes	Percentage	Electoral votes
Democratic	William Jennings Bryan	162,643	50.68%	12
Populist	William Jennings Bryan	4,525	1.41%	0
Total	William Jennings Bryan	167,168	52.09%	12
Republican	William McKinley	148,683	46.33%	0
Prohibition	Joshua Levering	3,099	0.97%	0
National Democratic	John M. Palmer	1,953	0.61%	0
Totals		320,903	100.00%	12
Voter turnout				—

=== Results by county ===
1896 United States presidential election in Tennessee by county
County	William Jennings Bryan Democratic		William McKinley Republican		Joshua Levering Prohibition		John M. Palmer National Democratic		Margin		Total votes cast
County	#	%	#	%	#	%	#	%	#	%	Total votes cast
Anderson	745	24.87%	2,224	74.23%	5	0.17%	22	0.73%	-1,479	-49.37%	2,996
Bedford	2,596	53.34%	2,151	44.20%	50	1.03%	70	1.44%	445	9.14%	4,867
Benton	1,465	65.20%	769	34.22%	12	0.53%	1	0.04%	696	30.97%	2,247
Bledsoe	478	37.49%	785	61.57%	0	0.00%	12	0.94%	-307	-24.08%	1,275
Blount	970	26.41%	2,652	72.20%	48	1.31%	3	0.08%	-1,682	-45.79%	3,673
Bradley	1,057	37.32%	1,725	60.91%	45	1.59%	5	0.18%	-668	-23.59%	2,832
Campbell	571	19.14%	2,389	80.06%	13	0.44%	11	0.37%	-1,818	-60.92%	2,984
Cannon	1,276	61.82%	778	37.69%	0	0.00%	10	0.48%	498	24.13%	2,064
Carroll	2,293	46.45%	2,577	52.20%	61	1.24%	6	0.12%	-284	-5.75%	4,937
Carter	445	13.87%	2,700	84.14%	35	1.09%	29	0.90%	-2,255	-70.27%	3,209
Cheatham	1,237	69.81%	496	27.99%	9	0.51%	30	1.69%	741	41.82%	1,772
Chester	1,078	63.37%	607	35.68%	14	0.82%	2	0.12%	471	27.69%	1,701
Claiborne	1,152	33.90%	2,230	65.63%	8	0.24%	8	0.24%	-1,078	-31.72%	3,398
Clay	836	59.42%	548	38.95%	22	1.56%	1	0.07%	288	20.47%	1,407
Cocke	980	27.47%	2,582	72.39%	0	0.00%	5	0.14%	-1,602	-44.91%	3,567
Coffee	1,891	72.42%	639	24.47%	52	1.99%	29	1.11%	1,252	47.95%	2,611
Crockett	1,665	58.12%	1,166	40.70%	34	1.19%	0	0.00%	499	17.42%	2,865
Cumberland	418	34.12%	800	65.31%	1	0.08%	6	0.49%	-382	-31.18%	1,225
Davidson	7,511	54.99%	5,720	41.88%	159	1.16%	269	1.97%	1,791	13.11%	13,659
DeKalb	1,626	49.39%	1,633	49.61%	28	0.85%	5	0.15%	-7	-0.21%	3,292
Decatur	997	52.78%	890	47.11%	2	0.11%	0	0.00%	107	5.66%	1,889
Dickson	1,976	68.92%	841	29.33%	36	1.26%	14	0.49%	1,135	39.59%	2,867
Dyer	2,589	73.63%	868	24.69%	44	1.25%	15	0.43%	1,721	48.95%	3,516
Fayette	2,373	63.79%	1,316	35.38%	9	0.24%	22	0.59%	1,057	28.41%	3,720
Fentress	301	27.17%	798	72.02%	0	0.00%	9	0.81%	-497	-44.86%	1,108
Franklin	2,584	73.79%	834	23.81%	50	1.43%	34	0.97%	1,750	49.97%	3,502
Gibson	4,203	65.87%	1,955	30.64%	216	3.39%	7	0.11%	2,248	35.23%	6,381
Giles	3,992	62.32%	2,372	37.03%	21	0.33%	21	0.33%	1,620	25.29%	6,406
Grainger	1,002	34.91%	1,863	64.91%	5	0.17%	0	0.00%	-861	-30.00%	2,870
Greene	2,726	42.83%	3,577	56.21%	53	0.83%	8	0.13%	-851	-13.37%	6,364
Grundy	997	75.99%	286	21.80%	17	1.30%	12	0.91%	711	54.19%	1,312
Hamblen	1,033	40.18%	1,506	58.58%	27	1.05%	5	0.19%	-473	-18.40%	2,571
Hamilton	3,729	44.32%	4,468	53.10%	121	1.44%	96	1.14%	-739	-8.78%	8,414
Hancock	456	23.35%	1,490	76.29%	7	0.36%	0	0.00%	-1,034	-52.94%	1,953
Hardeman	2,234	60.25%	1,427	38.48%	1	0.03%	46	1.24%	807	21.76%	3,708
Hardin	1,332	37.99%	2,165	61.75%	7	0.20%	2	0.06%	-833	-23.76%	3,506
Hawkins	1,723	37.65%	2,824	61.71%	13	0.28%	16	0.35%	-1,101	-24.06%	4,576
Haywood	2,392	78.79%	624	20.55%	2	0.07%	18	0.59%	1,768	58.23%	3,036
Henderson	1,316	39.11%	2,009	59.70%	40	1.19%	0	0.00%	-693	-20.59%	3,365
Henry	3,077	67.17%	1,473	32.15%	14	0.31%	17	0.37%	1,604	35.01%	4,581
Hickman	1,553	60.52%	988	38.50%	13	0.51%	12	0.47%	565	22.02%	2,566
Houston	896	70.16%	343	26.86%	23	1.80%	15	1.17%	553	43.30%	1,277
Humphreys	1,604	76.93%	465	22.30%	10	0.48%	6	0.29%	1,139	54.63%	2,085
Jackson	1,752	69.88%	754	30.08%	0	0.00%	1	0.04%	998	39.81%	2,507
James	327	33.37%	647	66.02%	4	0.41%	2	0.20%	-320	-32.65%	980
Jefferson	902	25.32%	2,638	74.06%	9	0.25%	13	0.36%	-1,736	-48.74%	3,562
Johnson	224	11.72%	1,683	88.02%	5	0.26%	0	0.00%	-1,459	-76.31%	1,912
Knox	4,020	38.52%	6,243	59.83%	117	1.12%	55	0.53%	-2,223	-21.30%	10,435
Lake	811	85.01%	126	13.21%	11	1.15%	6	0.63%	685	71.80%	954
Lauderdale	2,244	74.97%	709	23.69%	7	0.23%	33	1.10%	1,535	51.29%	2,993
Lawrence	1,376	53.21%	1,203	46.52%	0	0.00%	7	0.27%	173	6.69%	2,586
Lewis	329	61.73%	204	38.27%	0	0.00%	0	0.00%	125	23.45%	533
Lincoln	3,269	73.94%	992	22.44%	120	2.71%	40	0.90%	2,277	51.50%	4,421
Loudon	594	28.91%	1,447	70.41%	11	0.54%	3	0.15%	-853	-41.51%	2,055
Macon	869	39.63%	1,324	60.37%	0	0.00%	0	0.00%	-455	-20.75%	2,193
Madison	3,701	77.80%	1,024	21.53%	17	0.36%	15	0.32%	2,677	56.27%	4,757
Marion	1,320	41.85%	1,801	57.10%	5	0.16%	28	0.89%	-481	-15.25%	3,154
Marshall	2,835	75.50%	849	22.61%	57	1.52%	14	0.37%	1,986	52.89%	3,755
Maury	4,021	60.47%	2,537	38.15%	59	0.89%	33	0.50%	1,484	22.32%	6,650
McMinn	1,388	37.83%	2,235	60.92%	34	0.93%	12	0.33%	-847	-23.09%	3,669
McNairy	1,516	50.89%	1,463	49.11%	0	0.00%	0	0.00%	53	1.78%	2,979
Meigs	721	52.70%	641	46.86%	2	0.15%	4	0.29%	80	5.85%	1,368
Monroe	1,578	48.29%	1,634	50.00%	47	1.44%	9	0.28%	-56	-1.71%	3,268
Montgomery	2,804	46.04%	2,934	48.17%	252	4.14%	101	1.66%	-130	-2.13%	6,091
Moore	942	89.71%	78	7.43%	28	2.67%	2	0.19%	864	82.29%	1,050
Morgan	452	27.80%	1,140	70.11%	19	1.17%	15	0.92%	-688	-42.31%	1,626
Obion	3,775	74.59%	1,147	22.66%	98	1.94%	41	0.81%	2,628	51.93%	5,061
Overton	1,495	66.24%	761	33.72%	0	0.00%	1	0.04%	734	32.52%	2,257
Perry	1,000	63.57%	572	36.36%	0	0.00%	1	0.06%	428	27.21%	1,573
Pickett	394	42.00%	544	58.00%	0	0.00%	0	0.00%	-150	-15.99%	938
Polk	749	44.01%	947	55.64%	3	0.18%	3	0.18%	-198	-11.63%	1,702
Putnam	1,750	61.08%	1,097	38.29%	14	0.49%	4	0.14%	653	22.79%	2,865
Rhea	1,124	44.75%	1,324	52.71%	46	1.83%	18	0.72%	-200	-7.96%	2,512
Roane	821	20.51%	3,026	75.59%	142	3.55%	14	0.35%	-2,205	-55.08%	4,003
Robertson	2,943	65.02%	1,386	30.62%	182	4.02%	15	0.33%	1,557	34.40%	4,526
Rutherford	3,352	59.46%	2,203	39.08%	23	0.41%	59	1.05%	1,149	20.38%	5,637
Scott	209	10.96%	1,691	88.67%	7	0.37%	0	0.00%	-1,482	-77.71%	1,907
Sequatchie	386	61.27%	241	38.25%	3	0.48%	0	0.00%	145	23.02%	630
Sevier	428	11.20%	3,376	88.35%	13	0.34%	4	0.10%	-2,948	-77.15%	3,821
Shelby	5,830	52.01%	5,122	45.70%	42	0.37%	215	1.92%	708	6.32%	11,209
Smith	2,414	68.89%	1,064	30.37%	20	0.57%	6	0.17%	1,350	38.53%	3,504
Stewart	1,642	71.42%	648	28.19%	9	0.39%	0	0.00%	994	43.24%	2,299
Sullivan	2,512	56.05%	1,914	42.70%	53	1.18%	3	0.07%	598	13.34%	4,482
Sumner	3,171	71.34%	1,215	27.33%	11	0.25%	48	1.08%	1,956	44.00%	4,445
Tipton	2,119	51.07%	1,894	45.65%	13	0.31%	123	2.96%	225	5.42%	4,149
Trousdale	769	70.81%	313	28.82%	0	0.00%	4	0.37%	456	41.99%	1,086
Unicoi	89	9.86%	804	89.04%	7	0.78%	3	0.33%	-715	-79.18%	903
Union	599	24.30%	1,862	75.54%	2	0.08%	2	0.08%	-1,263	-51.24%	2,465
Van Buren	419	73.12%	140	24.43%	5	0.87%	9	1.57%	279	48.69%	573
Warren	2,101	69.96%	842	28.04%	39	1.30%	21	0.70%	1,259	41.92%	3,003
Washington	1,661	36.67%	2,807	61.98%	43	0.95%	18	0.40%	-1,146	-25.30%	4,529
Wayne	748	33.04%	1,505	66.48%	10	0.44%	1	0.04%	-757	-33.44%	2,264
Weakley	3,934	65.14%	2,003	33.17%	99	1.64%	3	0.05%	1,931	31.98%	6,039
White	1,839	74.12%	617	24.87%	16	0.64%	9	0.36%	1,222	49.25%	2,481
Williamson	3,097	69.66%	1,281	28.81%	51	1.15%	17	0.38%	1,816	40.85%	4,446
Wilson	3,436	68.17%	1,568	31.11%	17	0.34%	19	0.38%	1,868	37.06%	5,040
Totals	168,176	52.23%	148,773	46.20%	3,099	0.96%	1,953	0.61%	19,403	6.03%	322,001

== See also ==
- 1896 Tennessee gubernatorial election
- United States presidential elections in Tennessee
