= List of mayors of Morristown, Tennessee =

City of Morristown, Tennessee mayors

The following is a list of mayors of the city of Morristown, Tennessee, United States.

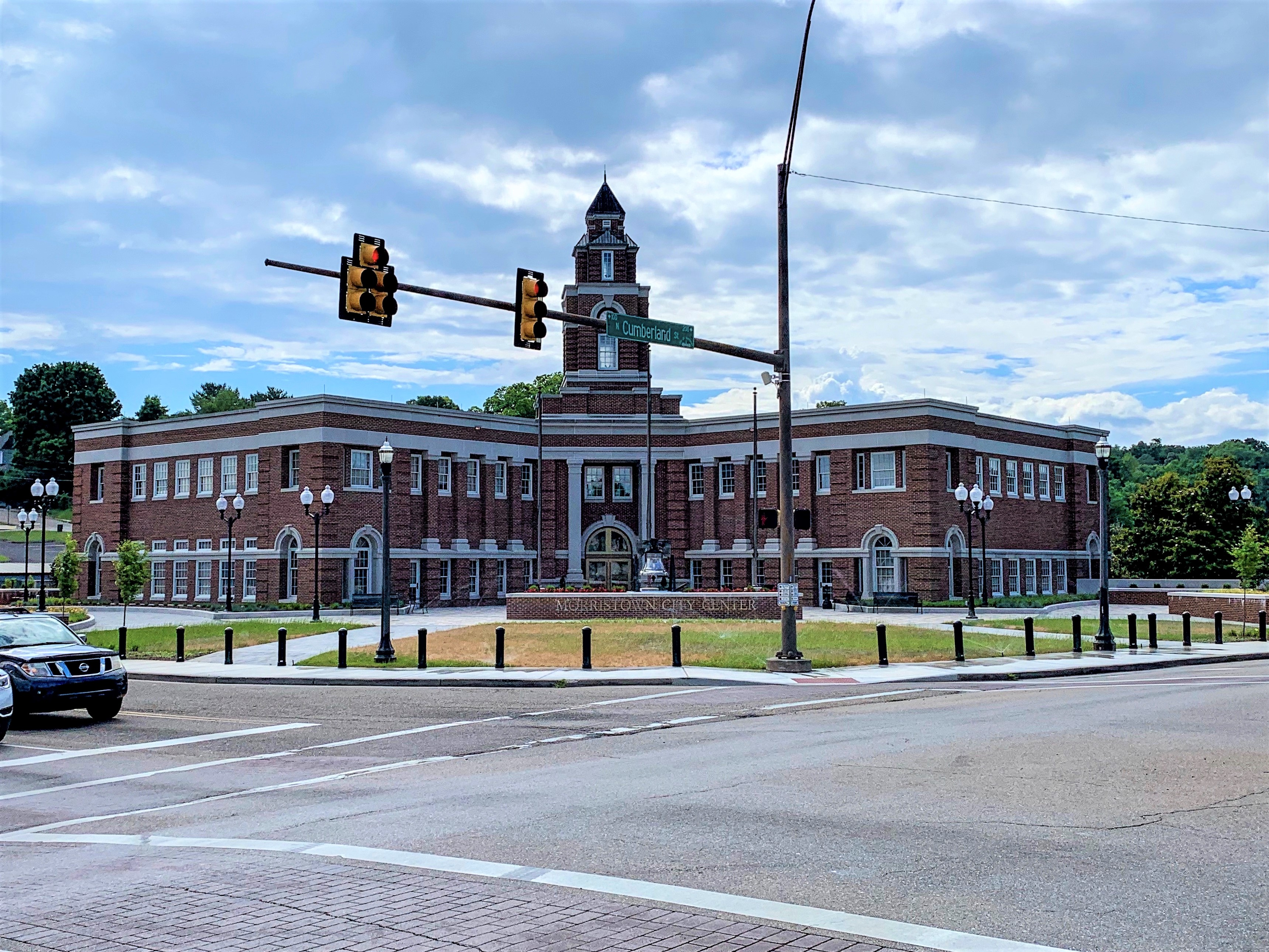
City Center building in Morristown, Tennessee, 2020

- William McFarland, c. 1882 – 1885
- James A. Carriger, 1893–1894
- Edward Mark Grant, 1904–1906, ca.1911
- William Byrd Whittaker, 1915–1916
- Wilbur G. Ruble, ca.1920
- Leander "Lee" King Donaldson, ca.1937
- J.G. Wallace, ca.1949
- John D. Henderson, c. 1953 – 1954
- C. Frank Davis, c. 1958 – 1965
- Charles Buda, c. 1970 – 1975
- John Johnson, c. 1980 – 1995
- Gary R. Johnson, c. 2003 – 2004
- Danny Thomas, ca.2011
- Gary Chesney, c. 2016 – 2024

== See also ==
- Morristown history
