= Bradley Academy Museum =

- Bradley Academy
- U.S. National Register of Historic Places
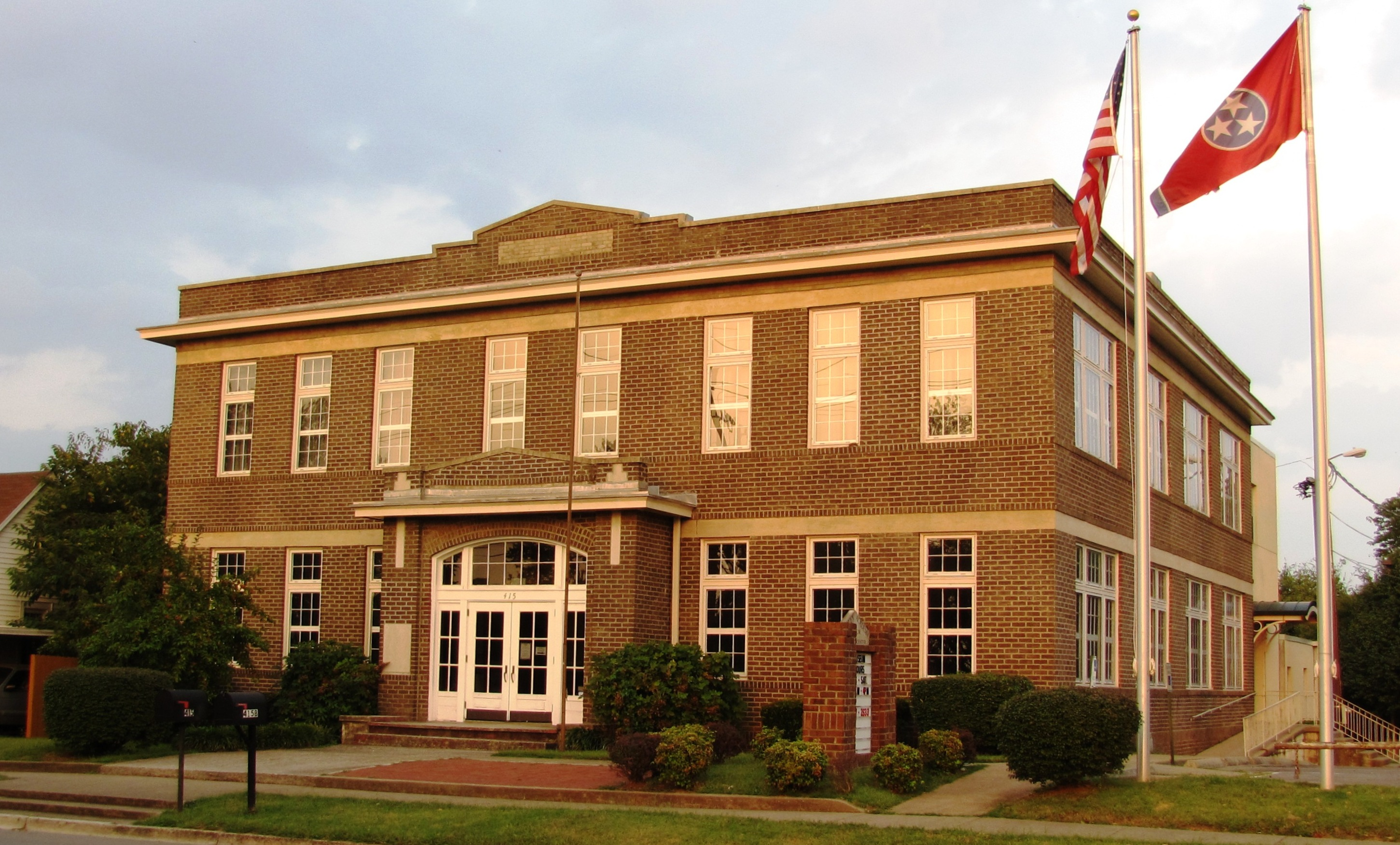

- Location within Tennessee Location within the United States
- Location: 415 S. Academy St., Murfreesboro, Tennessee
- Coordinates: 35°50′32.06″N 86°23′21.01″W
- Area: less than one acre
- Built: 1918
- Architectural style: School building
- NRHP reference No.: 90000914
- Added to NRHP: June 14, 1990

Bradley Academy Museum is a historic school building in Murfreesboro, Tennessee, that now serves as a museum and community center.

== History ==
The original Bradley Academy was established in 1811 near Jefferson, the original county seat of Rutherford County, as the county's first school. Its namesake was John Bradley, an officer in the American Revolutionary War, who donated the land that the first school was built on. The school later relocated to Murfreesboro and operated as a school for white students until the 1850s. In 1884, Bradley Academy was revived to become the county's first school for African Americans.

The current building was built circa 1917–8 and was operated as a school for African-American children until 1955, when the school moved to the current Bradley Academy location on Mercury Boulevard. Murfreesboro City Schools converted the building into a maintenance facility.

In 1990 the Bradley Academy Historical Association formed with the purpose of restoring the building for community use. The building was listed on the National Register of Historic Places that same year. The organization obtained funding for the restoration project from sources including the Christy-Houston Foundation, the Tennessee state government, and the U.S. Department of Housing and Urban Development. The building opened as a community center in 2000. It hosts exhibits on the history of Rutherford County, particularly of African Americans in the area.

== Current school ==
The Bradley Academy name is still in use as the name of a public elementary school in Murfreesboro, located at 511 Mercury Boulevard.
