= Windrow, Tennessee =

- Unincorporated community
- Location within Tennessee Location within the United States
- Coordinates: 35°47′55″N 86°33′18″W
- Country: United States
- State: Tennessee
- County: Rutherford
- Elevation: 846 ft (258 m)
- Time zone: UTC-6 (Central (CST))
  - Summer (DST): UTC-5 (CDT)
- Area codes: 615 & 629
- GNIS feature ID: 1314521

Windrow is an unincorporated community in Rutherford County, Tennessee, United States.
