= Rutherford County, Tennessee =

County in Tennessee, United States

- County
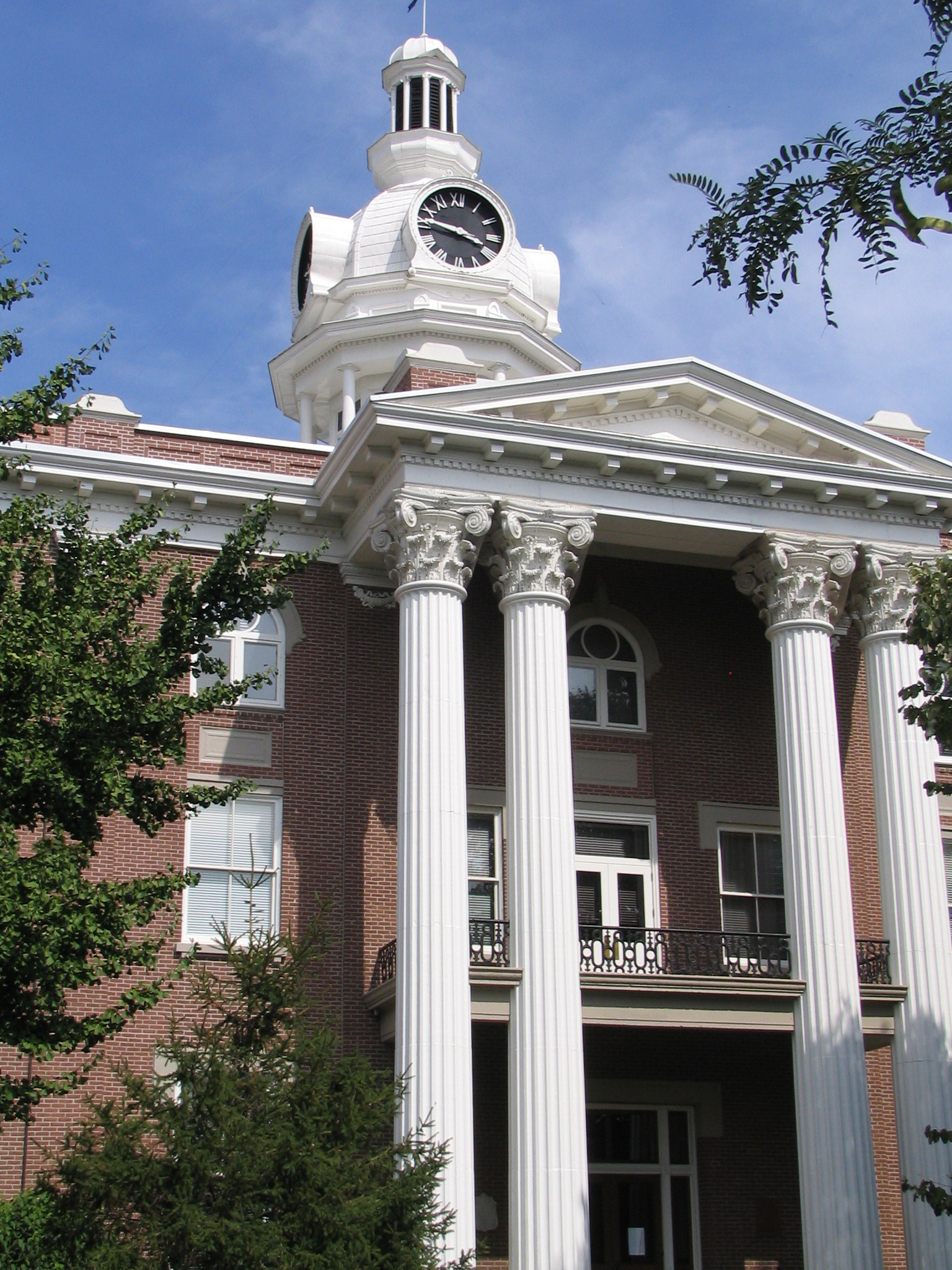
- Rutherford County Courthouse, Murfreesboro

- Flag Seal

- Location within the U.S. state of Tennessee
- Country: United States
- State: Tennessee
- Founded: October 25, 1803
- Named for: Griffith Rutherford
- Seat: Murfreesboro
- Largest city: Murfreesboro

Government
  - Mayor: Randy Allen(R)

Area
  - Total: 624 sq mi (1,620 km^{2})
  - Land: 619 sq mi (1,600 km^{2})
  - Water: 4.7 sq mi (12 km^{2}) 0.8%

Population (2020)
  - Total: 341,486
  - Estimate (2025): 386,352 ▲
  - Density: 552/sq mi (213/km^{2})
- Time zone: UTC−6 (Central)
  - Summer (DST): UTC−5 (CDT)
- ZIP Codes: 37037, 37060, 37063, 37085, 37086, 37089, 37118, 37127, 37128, 37129, 37130, 37131, 37132, 37133, 37153, 37167
- Area code: 615, 629
- Congressional district: 4th
- Website: rutherfordcountytn.gov

Rutherford County is a county located in the U.S. state of Tennessee. It is located in Middle Tennessee. As of a 2025 estimate, the population was 386,352, making it the fifth-most populous county in Tennessee. A study conducted by the University of Tennessee projects Rutherford County to become the third largest county in Tennessee by population by 2050. Its county seat is Murfreesboro, which is also the geographic center of Tennessee. As of 2010, it was the center of population of Tennessee. Rutherford County is included in the Nashville-Davidson–Murfreesboro–Franklin, TN Metropolitan Statistical Area.

== History ==
=== Early history ===
Rutherford County was formed in 1803 from parts of Davidson, Williamson and Wilson counties, and named in honor of Griffith Rutherford (1721–1805). Rutherford was a North Carolina colonial legislator and an American Revolutionary War general, who settled in Middle Tennessee after the Revolution. He was appointed President of the Council of the Southwest Territory (the upper chamber of the territorial legislature) in 1794.

=== Civil War ===
Rutherford County strongly supported the Confederacy during the Civil War, having voted 2,392 to 73 in favor of Tennessee's Ordinance of Secession on June 8, 1861.

Rutherford County's central location and proximity to Nashville during the Civil War made it a contested area. The county was home to one of the bloodiest battles of the war, the Battle of Stones River, which was fought between December 31, 1862, and January 2, 1863.

On July 13, 1862, Confederate General Nathan Bedford Forrest conducted a series of cavalry operations known locally as Forrest's Raid. The raid successfully led to the surrender of all Union forces occupying the area. Soon after his departure, Union troops returned to the area and held it until the end of the war.

=== Reconstruction and latter 19th century ===
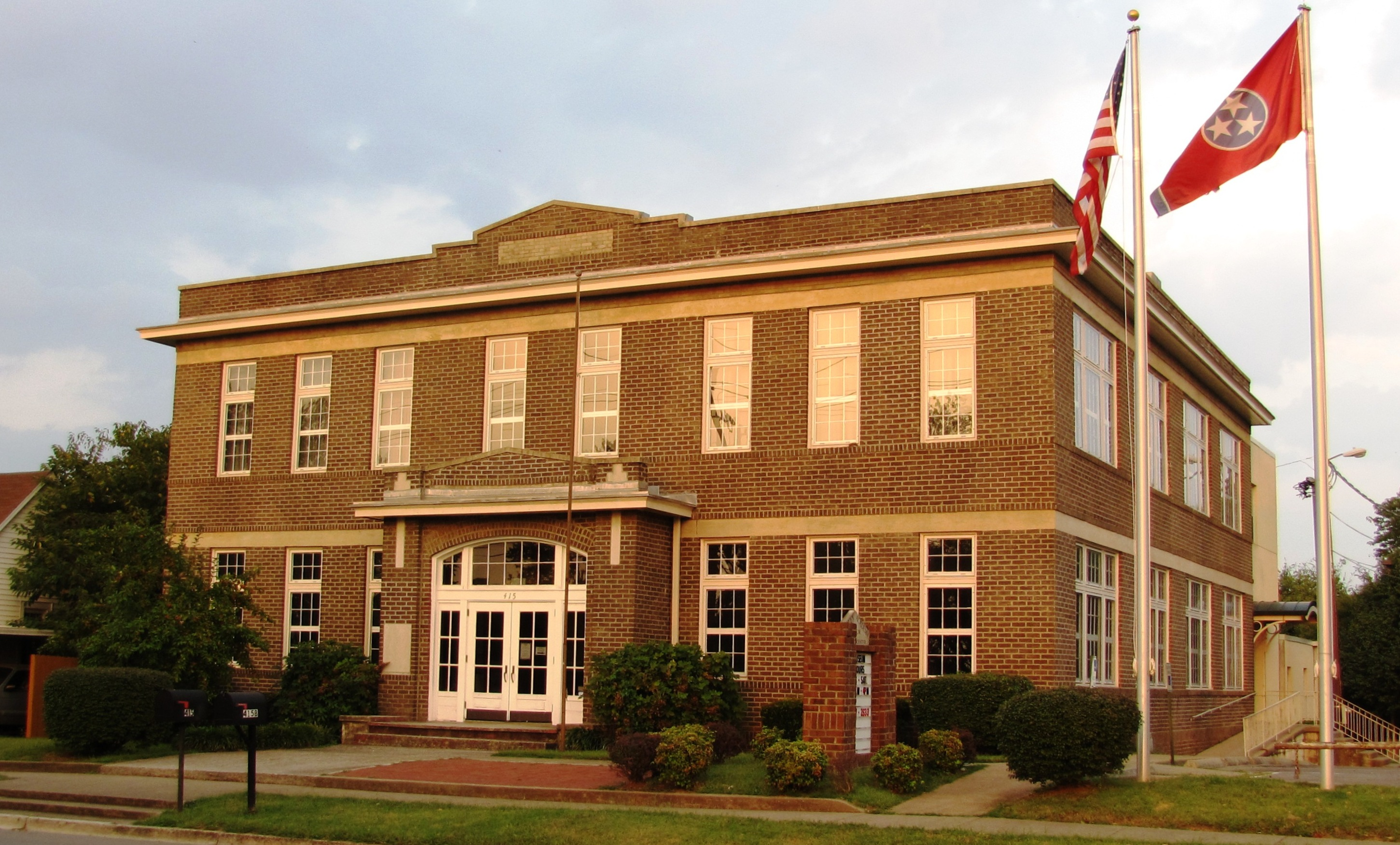
Opened in 1884, Bradley Academy was Rutherford County's first high school for African Americans

In August 1869, rampaging white men drove close to 100 African American farmers from their homes, and out of the county, to Nashville.

In 1884, Bradley Academy in Murfreesboro became Rutherford County's first accredited high school for African Americans. The co-educational school was operated by the Murfreesboro City Schools system. Bradley Academy was placed on the National Register of Historic Places in 1990.

=== Modern history ===
In the early 2000s, Muslim immigrants settled in the county, particularly in and around Murfreesboro. Their efforts to develop a mosque, the Islamic Center of Murfreesboro (and its subsequent replacement) became the focus of intense local controversy and opposition from non-Muslims, and were stymied by political and legal battles, arson, bomb threats and vandalism. A federal court forced the local authorities to allow the mosque, and opposition subsided, but sporadic incidents continued.

== Geography ==
According to the U.S. Census Bureau, the county has a total area of 624 square miles (1,620 km^{2}), of which 619 square miles (1,600 km^{2}) is land and 4.7 square miles (12 km^{2}) (0.8%) is water.

=== Adjacent counties ===
- Wilson County (north)
- Cannon County (east)
- Coffee County (southeast)
- Bedford County (south)
- Marshall County (southwest)
- Williamson County (west)
- Davidson County (northwest)

=== National protected area ===
- Stones River National Battlefield

=== State protected areas ===
- Flat Rock Cedar Glades and Barrens State Natural Area
- Gattinger's Cedar Glade and Barrens State Natural Area (part)
- Long Hunter State Park (part)
- Manus Road Cedar Glade State Natural Area
- Overbridge State Natural Area
- Percy Priest Wildlife Management Area (part)
- Elsie Quarterman Cedar Glade State Natural Area
- Fate Sanders Barrens State Natural Area
- Sunnybell Cedar Glade State Natural Area
- Stones River Cedar Glade and Barrens State Natural Area
- Walterhill Floodplain State Natural Area

== Demographics ==
Historical population
Census	Pop.	Note	%±
1810	10,265		—
1820	19,552		90.5%
1830	26,134		33.7%
1840	24,280		−7.1%
1850	29,122		19.9%
1860	27,918		−4.1%
1870	33,289		19.2%
1880	36,741		10.4%
1890	35,097		−4.5%
1900	33,543		−4.4%
1910	33,199		−1.0%
1920	33,059		−0.4%
1930	32,286		−2.3%
1940	33,604		4.1%
1950	40,696		21.1%
1960	52,368		28.7%
1970	59,428		13.5%
1980	84,058		41.4%
1990	118,570		41.1%
2000	182,023		53.5%
2010	262,604		44.3%
2020	341,486		30.0%
2025 (est.)	386,352	▲	13.1%
U.S. Decennial Census; 1790-1960 1900-1990; 1990-2000 2010-2020

=== Racial and ethnic composition ===
Rutherford County, Tennessee – Racial and ethnic composition Note: the US Census treats Hispanic/Latino as an ethnic category. This table excludes Latinos from the racial categories and assigns them to a separate category. Hispanics/Latinos may be of any race.
Race / Ethnicity (NH = Non-Hispanic)	Pop 1980	Pop 1990	Pop 2000	Pop 2010	Pop 2020	% 1980	% 1990	% 2000	% 2010	% 2020
White alone (NH)	74,302	105,139	153,762	198,483	219,194	88.39%	88.67%	84.47%	75.58%	64.19%
Black or African American alone (NH)	8,513	10,602	17,197	32,534	53,270	10.13%	8.94%	9.45%	12.39%	15.60%
Native American or Alaska Native alone (NH)	92	213	470	671	789	0.11%	0.18%	0.26%	0.26%	0.23%
Asian alone (NH)	185	1,641	3,443	7,901	12,394	0.22%	1.38%	1.89%	3.01%	3.63%
Native Hawaiian or Pacific Islander alone (NH)	x	x	68	116	219	x	x	0.04%	0.04%	0.06%
Other race alone (NH)	445	49	147	336	1,642	0.53%	0.04%	0.08%	0.13%	0.48%
Mixed race or Multiracial (NH)	x	x	1,871	5,063	15,661	x	x	1.03%	1.93%	4.59%
Hispanic or Latino (any race)	521	926	5,065	17,500	38,317	0.62%	0.78%	2.78%	6.66%	11.22%
Total	84,058	118,570	182,023	262,604	341,486	100.00%	100.00%	100.00%	100.00%	100.00%

=== 2020 census ===
As of the 2020 United States census, there were 341,486 people, 124,465 households, and 78,348 families residing in the county. The median age was 34.4 years; 25.2% of residents were under the age of 18 and 11.2% of residents were 65 years of age or older. For every 100 females there were 95.0 males, and for every 100 females age 18 and over there were 92.5 males age 18 and over.

The racial makeup of the county was 66.2% White, 15.8% Black or African American, 0.5% American Indian and Alaska Native, 3.7% Asian, 0.1% Native Hawaiian and Pacific Islander, 5.8% from some other race, and 7.9% from two or more races. Hispanic or Latino residents of any race comprised 11.2% of the population.

84.0% of residents lived in urban areas, while 16.0% lived in rural areas.

There were 124,465 households in the county, of which 36.7% had children under the age of 18 living in them. Of all households, 49.4% were married-couple households, 17.2% were households with a male householder and no spouse or partner present, and 26.3% were households with a female householder and no spouse or partner present. About 23.0% of all households were made up of individuals and 7.0% had someone living alone who was 65 years of age or older.

There were 131,216 housing units, of which 5.1% were vacant. Among occupied housing units, 62.6% were owner-occupied and 37.4% were renter-occupied. The homeowner vacancy rate was 1.3% and the rental vacancy rate was 6.9%.

=== 2010 census ===
As of the census of 2010, there were 262,604 people, 96,232 households, and 66,810 families living in the county. The population density was 424 people per square mile (164 people/km^{2}), and the housing unit density was 156 units per square mile (60 units/km^{2}). The racial makeup of the county was 80.67% White, 12.65% Black or African American, 3.08% Asian, 0.36% Native American, 0.05% Pacific Islander, and 2.04% from two or more races. Those of Hispanic or Latino origins were 6.67% of the population.

Of the 96,232 households, 35.19% had children under the age of 18 living in them, 51.61% were married couples living together, 5.04% had a male householder with no wife present, 12.77% had a female householder with no husband present, and 30.59% were non-families. 22.10% of all households were made up of individuals, and 5.38% had someone living alone who was 65 years of age or older. The average household size was 2.68 and the average family size was 3.14.

Of the 262,604 residents, 26.17% were under the age of 18, 65.62% were between the ages of 18 and 64, and 8.21% were 65 years of age and older. The median age was 33.1 years. 50.60% of all residents were female and 49.40% were male.

The median household income in the county was $53,770 and the median family income was $63,483. Males had a median income of $43,306 versus $35,437 for females. The per capita income was $24,390. About 8.8% of families and 12.7% of the population were below the poverty line, including 16.2% of those under the age of 18 and 7.4% of those age 65 and over.

=== 2000 census ===
As of the 2000 census, there were 182,023 people, 66,443 households, and 47,440 families living in the county. The population density was 294 people per square mile (114 people/km^{2}), and there were 70,616 housing units. The racial makeup of the county was 85.73% White, 9.51% Black or African American, 1.90% Asian, 0.29% Native American, 0.04% Pacific Islander, 1.32% from other races, and 1.20% from two or more races. 2.78% of the population were Hispanic or Latino of any race.

There were 66,443 households, out of which 37.80% had children under the age of 18 living with them, 56.30% were married couples living together, 11.20% had a female head of household with no husband present, and 28.60% were non-families. 20.80% of all households were made up of individuals, and 5.10% had someone living alone who was 65 years of age or older. The average household size was 2.65 and the average family size was 3.09.

In the county, the population was spread out, with 26.40% under the age of 18, 13.20% from 18 to 24, 33.50% from 25 to 44, 19.40% from 45 to 64, and 7.50% who were 65 years of age or older. The median age was 31 years. For every 100 females, there were 99.10 males. For every 100 females age 18 and over, there were 97.20 males.

The median income for a household in the county was $46,312, and the median income for a family was $53,553. Males had a median income of $36,788 versus $26,555 for females. The per capita income for the county was $19,938. About 5.80% of families and 9.00% of the population were below the poverty line, including 8.50% of those under age 18 and 9.40% of those age 65 or over.

== Government and politics ==
=== Schools ===
Rutherford County Schools serves the entire county except K-6 students in the city of Murfreesboro.

=== Countywide elected officials ===
Office	Name
District 16 Attorney General	Jennings Jones (R)
County Mayor	Joe Carr (R)
Sheriff	Mike Fitzhugh (R)
Trustee	Teb Batey (R)
Assessor of Property	Rob Mitchell (R)
Highway Superintendent	Greg Brooks (R)
County Clerk	Lisa Duke Crowell (R)
Register of Deeds	Heather Dawbarn (R)
Circuit Court Clerk	Melissa Harrell (R)

==== State elected offices ====
Rutherford County is represented in the Tennessee General Assembly by two Republicans in the Tennessee Senate and five Republicans in the Tennessee House of Representatives.

Office	Name
State Senator, District 13	Dawn White (R)
State Senator, District 14	Shane Reeves (R)

Office	Name
State Representative, District 13	Robert Stevens (R)
State Representative, District 34	Tim Rudd (R)
State Representative, District 37	Charlie Baum (R)
State Representative, District 48	Bryan Terry (R)
State Representative, District 49	Mike Sparks (R)

==== County Mayor ====
The county mayor is the chief executive officer and is elected from the county at-large.

==== County Commission ====
Rutherford County Commission by partisanship
All 21 districts 11 seats needed for a majority
	Majority party	Minority party	Third party
Party	Republican	Democratic	Independent
Seats	13	7	1
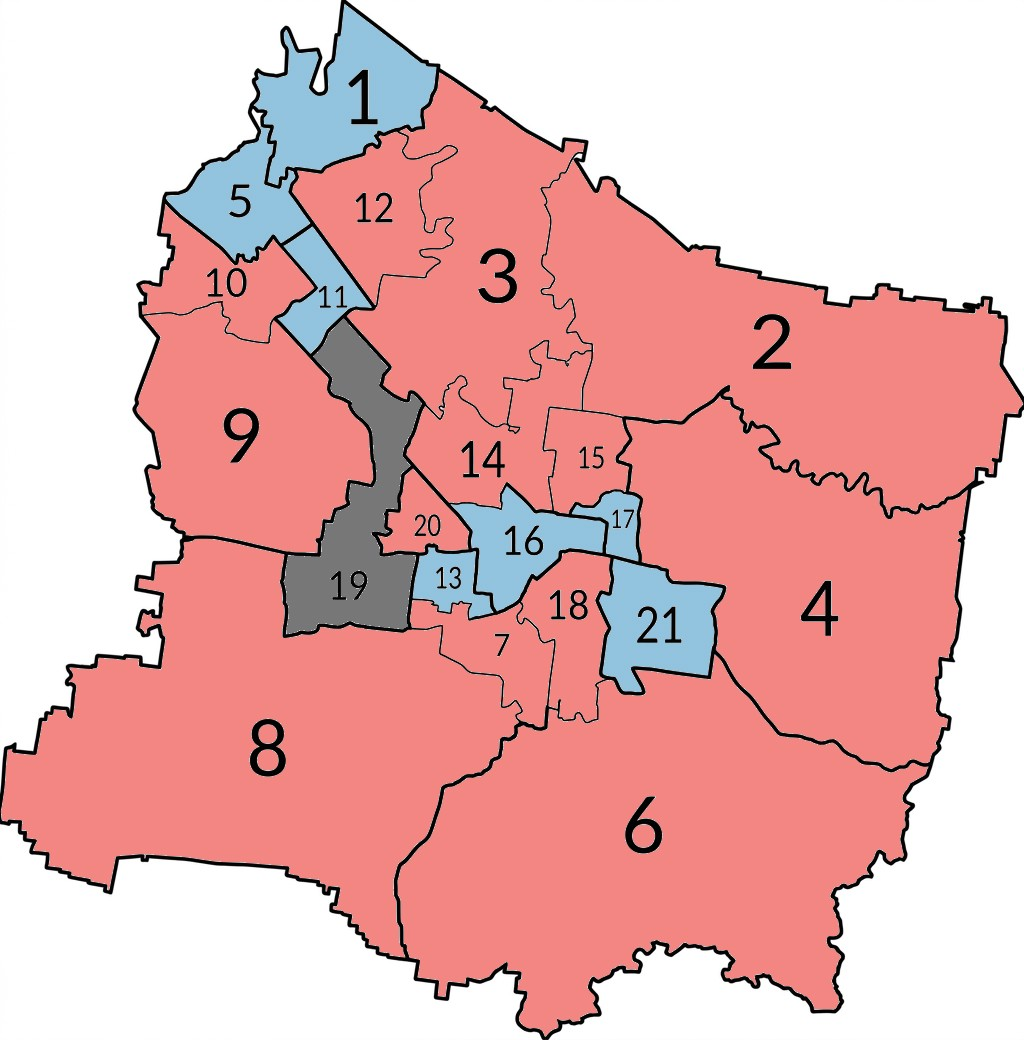
- As of 2026; Republican Democratic Independent

The Board of County Commissioners, the county legislative body, consists of 21 members elected for four-year terms from single-member districts based on roughly equal populations. In the most recent election, the county commission composition resulted in 13 seats for Republicans, 7 seats for Democrats, and 1 seat for an independent. This was a 5 seat gain for the Democrats.

==== Education governance ====
Rutherford County School Board by partisanship
All 7 districts 4 seats needed for a majority
	Majority party	Minority party
Party	Republican	Democratic
Seats	6	1
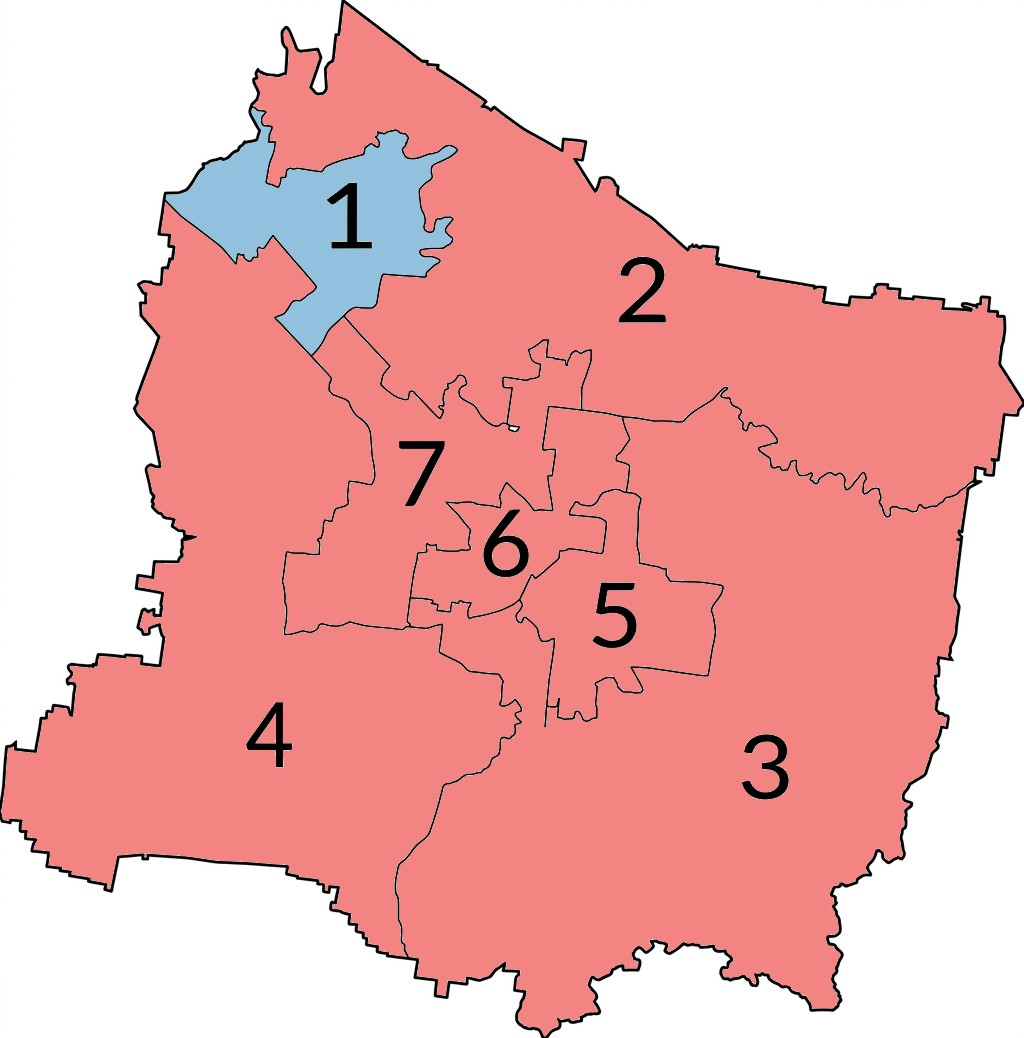
- As of 2026; Republican

The Rutherford County School Board manages the school system. The board consists of 7 members elected from specific zones. Republicans currently hold 6 seats while Democrats hold 1.

==== Sheriff and jail ====
In 2008, the county built a $23,300,000 expansion to the county jail. It is alleged that some county officials viewed the jail as a for-profit business.

In May 2016, Rutherford County Sheriff Robert Arnold, his Chief Administrative Deputy Joe L. Russell and the sheriff's uncle were named in a 14-count federal indictment charging fraud, bribery, extortion, obstruction of justice, and conspiracy for operating an e-cigarette business, for personal gain, in the jail. State officials reported that the JailCigs business gained over $110,000 in revenues pocketed by Arnold and Russell. All pleaded guilty. Arnold was sentenced to 50 months in federal prison, his deputy to 15 months. Sheriff Mike Fitzhugh replaced Arnold. Sheriff's Major Terry McBurney pleaded guilty to unrelated charges, losing his citizenship.

In December 2016, following multiple deaths in the jail that year, including two suicides (one resulting in a $260,000 lawsuit settlement against the county), state inspectors decertified the jail, citing faults in the jail's policies, programs, staffing and the physical plant. Following numerous changes to policies and facilities—particularly inmate supervision and monitoring, and converting 400 beds to bunk beds, to allow the jail to hold 950 people—the jail was recertified in 2017.

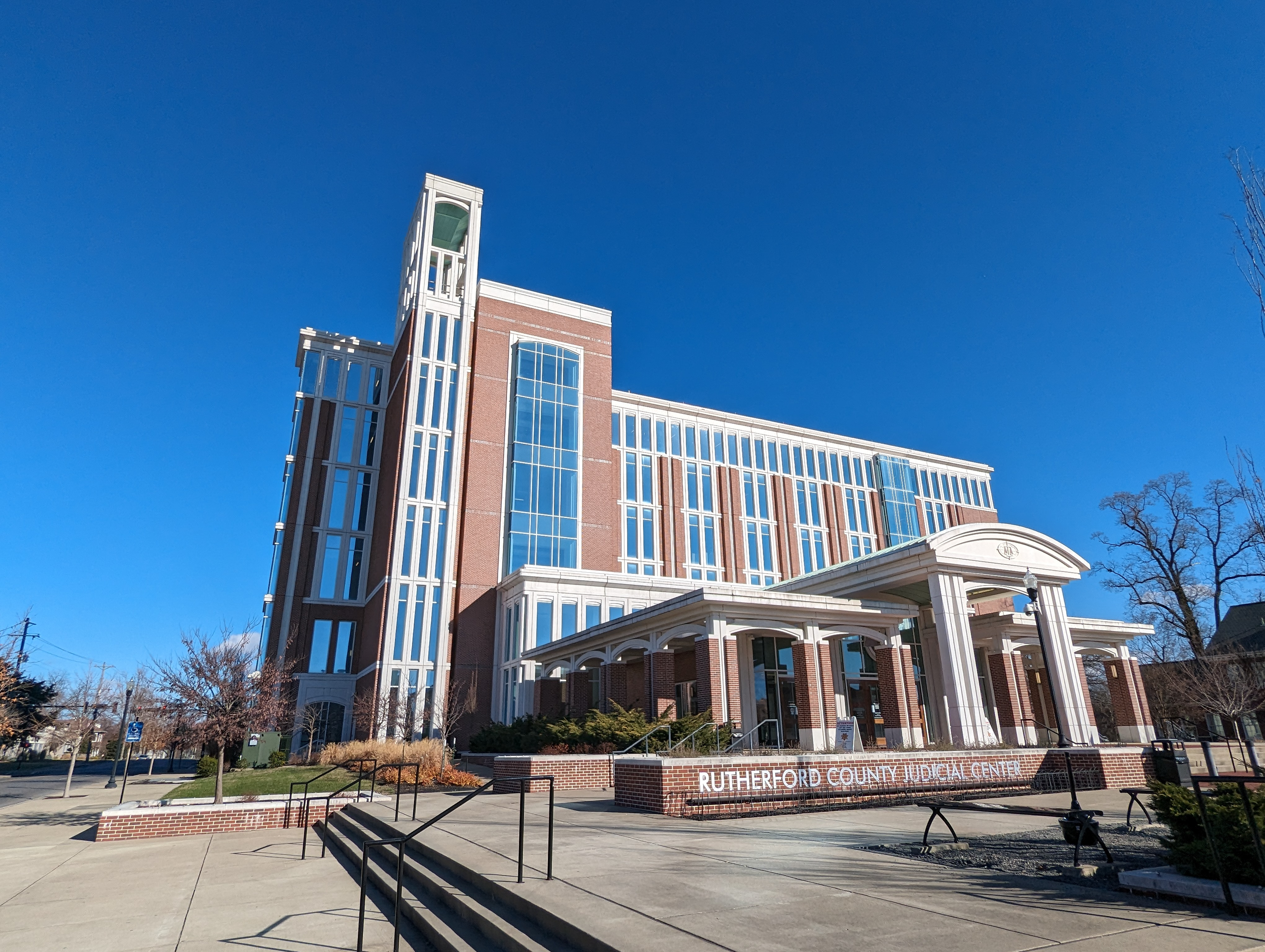
Rutherford County Judicial Building in Murfreesboro

==== Juvenile justice and jail ====
In 2000, Rutherford County created the post of Juvenile Court Judge to oversee the county's juvenile justice procedures.

As part of the $23 million development of the county jail, in 2008, a juvenile detention center (JDC) was added. Some county officials allegedly viewed the juvenile jail as a for-profit business. At a public meeting, JDC director Lynn Duke stated that, “If we have empty beds, we will fill them with a paying customer" and "We get a lot of business” A county commissioner added, that "Hey, it’s a business. Generating revenue."

The county then solicited other counties in Tennessee and surrounding states to send detained youth to the Rutherford County juvenile jail for incarceration, at $175 per day per child, and said that over 20 Tennessee counties had contracted with Rutherford's juvenile jail. The county released a marketing video, "What Can the Rutherford County Juvenile Detention Center Do For You?” featuring images of children in black-and-white striped prison uniforms, and narrated by Juvenile Court Judge Donna Scott Davenport, to solicit business for the JDC. As of 2021, 39 Tennessee counties were contracting with Rutherford County to incarcerate youth, along with the U.S. Marshals Service.

It is alleged that in subsequent years, the singular Rutherford County juvenile judge and local authorities, including the county's Juvenile Detention Center director Lynn Duke, colluded in the arrest and incarceration of hundreds of children, some as young as seven years old, on various misdemeanor charges, including schoolyard fights, truancy and cursing. All arrested children were jailed in the detention center, pending adjudication and assessment.

In 2021, journalists reported that children were being incarcerated in the county's juvenile jail at a rate ten times higher than the state's average, and that some children were arrested and jailed for alleged violations of non-existent laws. Class action federal lawsuits resulted in the county ending solitary confinement of children in custody. In May 2017, a federal court said that children were being illegally detained in Rutherford County, and ordered the county to stop using its "filter" system because it "departs drastically" from ordinary juvenile detention standards.

In June 2021, Rutherford County settled with plaintiffs in a class action lawsuit, agreeing to payments of up to $11 million, to up to 1,450 potential claimants for wrongful arrest or incarceration, but denying any wrongdoing. The settlement amount was amended to $5.1 million in December 2021. The settlement was subsequently denied by the county's insurer, Lloyd's of London, which wrote that the county was aware of its illegal juvenile detention practices prior to its coverage by the insurer, but "concealed or misrepresented material facts" to obtain the policy, which voided the policy; the county filed a federal lawsuit against the insurer in December 2022.

In August 2022, Republican Juvenile Court nominee Travis Lampley won the judgeship, stating the goals of restoring confidence in the juvenile court, and pledged "to uphold the integrity of the family unit", while the Rutherford County Commission is assembling a new Juvenile Detention Board to "oversee incarceration operations", including juvenile detention staff, who report to Judge Davenport.

==== Privatized corrections ====
Rutherford County outsourced some of its probation administration to Providence Community Corrections, and, in 2015, the arrangement was alleged in court to have violated racketeering laws—jailing impoverished people who did not pay court fines for misdemeanor offenses and traffic violations, and refusing to waive fees for indigent convicts. Seven probationers, many sick or disabled, living on food stamps, charged in court that they lost housing, jobs, cars—after multiple threats from Providence that they would be jailed for failing to pay. In 2017, Rutherford County consented to end the use of for-profit, private probation companies, and PCC agreed to pay $14 million, spread among up to 25,000 court-identified victims, to settle the class action lawsuit.

=== Presidential politics ===
United States presidential election results for Rutherford County, Tennessee
Year	Republican		Democratic		Third party(ies)	
Year	No.	%	No.	%	No.	%
1880	2,482	38.70%	3,855	60.10%	77	1.20%
1884	2,040	41.60%	2,828	57.67%	36	0.73%
1888	2,479	41.34%	3,302	55.07%	215	3.59%
1892	1,210	29.83%	2,211	54.51%	635	15.66%
1896	2,203	39.08%	3,352	59.46%	82	1.45%
1900	1,429	35.36%	2,517	62.29%	95	2.35%
1904	1,348	34.66%	2,504	64.39%	37	0.95%
1908	1,226	30.73%	2,764	69.27%	0	0.00%
1912	1,217	24.50%	3,406	68.57%	344	6.93%
1916	1,116	27.51%	2,941	72.49%	0	0.00%
1920	1,881	35.58%	3,406	64.42%	0	0.00%
1924	680	23.87%	2,137	75.01%	32	1.12%
1928	1,429	40.32%	2,115	59.68%	0	0.00%
1932	606	13.32%	3,924	86.24%	20	0.44%
1936	580	12.31%	4,101	87.07%	29	0.62%
1940	782	15.61%	4,207	83.99%	20	0.40%
1944	879	15.59%	4,730	83.89%	29	0.51%
1948	854	14.05%	4,151	68.30%	1,073	17.65%
1952	3,196	31.77%	6,793	67.52%	72	0.72%
1956	2,713	29.15%	6,494	69.78%	99	1.06%
1960	4,526	40.95%	6,410	58.00%	116	1.05%
1964	4,088	29.91%	9,580	70.09%	0	0.00%
1968	4,168	24.72%	4,921	29.18%	7,773	46.10%
1972	11,256	64.12%	5,811	33.10%	487	2.77%
1976	7,921	34.32%	14,854	64.35%	307	1.33%
1980	11,208	40.98%	15,213	55.62%	929	3.40%
1984	19,503	61.98%	11,618	36.92%	348	1.11%
1988	20,397	62.18%	12,245	37.33%	159	0.48%
1992	18,877	40.04%	21,084	44.73%	7,179	15.23%
1996	24,565	47.61%	22,815	44.22%	4,214	8.17%
2000	33,445	53.79%	27,360	44.00%	1,377	2.21%
2004	52,200	61.84%	31,647	37.49%	562	0.67%
2008	59,892	58.78%	40,460	39.71%	1,547	1.52%
2012	60,846	61.56%	36,414	36.84%	1,588	1.61%
2016	64,515	60.05%	36,706	34.17%	6,215	5.78%
2020	81,480	56.63%	59,341	41.24%	3,057	2.12%
2024	88,811	60.15%	56,656	38.37%	2,189	1.48%

==== Political history ====
This area of the state was predominately Democratic following the American Civil War, but the significant minority of African Americans joined the Republican Party. The white-dominated state legislature in the 1880s passed four laws that effectively disenfranchised most blacks and many poor whites, particularly due to the requirement of payment of a poll tax in order to register to vote, which reduced the competitiveness of the Republican Party in this part of the state.

Since the late 20th century, the majority of white conservatives in Rutherford County shifted toward the Republican Party. Since this time, the changing demographics of the county has shown a significant increase in minorities; however, this change has resulted in no significant impact to party alignment. In recent years, the county has favored Republican candidates for local, state, and national elections. Democratic strength is largely concentrated in La Vergne and parts of Murfreesboro itself, with La Vergne having voted Democratic in every recent statewide election except 2022 and Murfreesboro being carried by Phil Bredesen in 2018 and lost by Karl Dean and Joe Biden by single-digit margins in 2018 and 2020 respectively. Nonetheless, Rutherford County has no Democratic state legislators due to Republicans splitting Democratic voters in La Vergne and Murfreesboro among all five state House districts assigned to the county, leaving it with no districts Bredesen would've won despite his strength in La Vergne and flip of Murfreesboro.

== Economy ==
The top employers in the county are listed below. Rutherford County government including Rutherford County Schools also employ 7,441 individuals.

=== Murfreesboro ===
- Amazon Fulfillment Center: 2,700
- Middle Tennessee State University: 2,205
- City of Murfreesboro: 2,388
- State Farm Insurance: 1,650
- Ascension St. Thomas Rutherford: 1,741
- Alvin C. York Veterans Administration Medical Center: 1,300

=== Smyrna and La Vergne ===
- Nissan Motor Company: 8,000
- Ingram Book Company: 1,700
- Taylor Farms: 1,700
- Asurion: 1,250

The county is also home to Barrett Firearms Manufacturing and a General Mills production facility.

== Communities ==
=== Cities ===
- Eagleville
- La Vergne
- Murfreesboro (county seat)

=== Town ===
- Smyrna

=== Census-designated places ===
- Christiana
- Rockvale
- Walterhill

=== Unincorporated communities ===
- Allisona (partial)
- Almaville
- Barfield
- Blackman
- Cason Lane
- Cedar Grove
- Florence
- Fosterville
- Kittrell
- Lascassas
- Midland
- Milton
- Overall
- Readyville (partial)
- Salem
- Versailles
- Windrow

== See also ==
- National Register of Historic Places listings in Rutherford County, Tennessee
