= James Henry Randolph =

American politician (1825–1900)

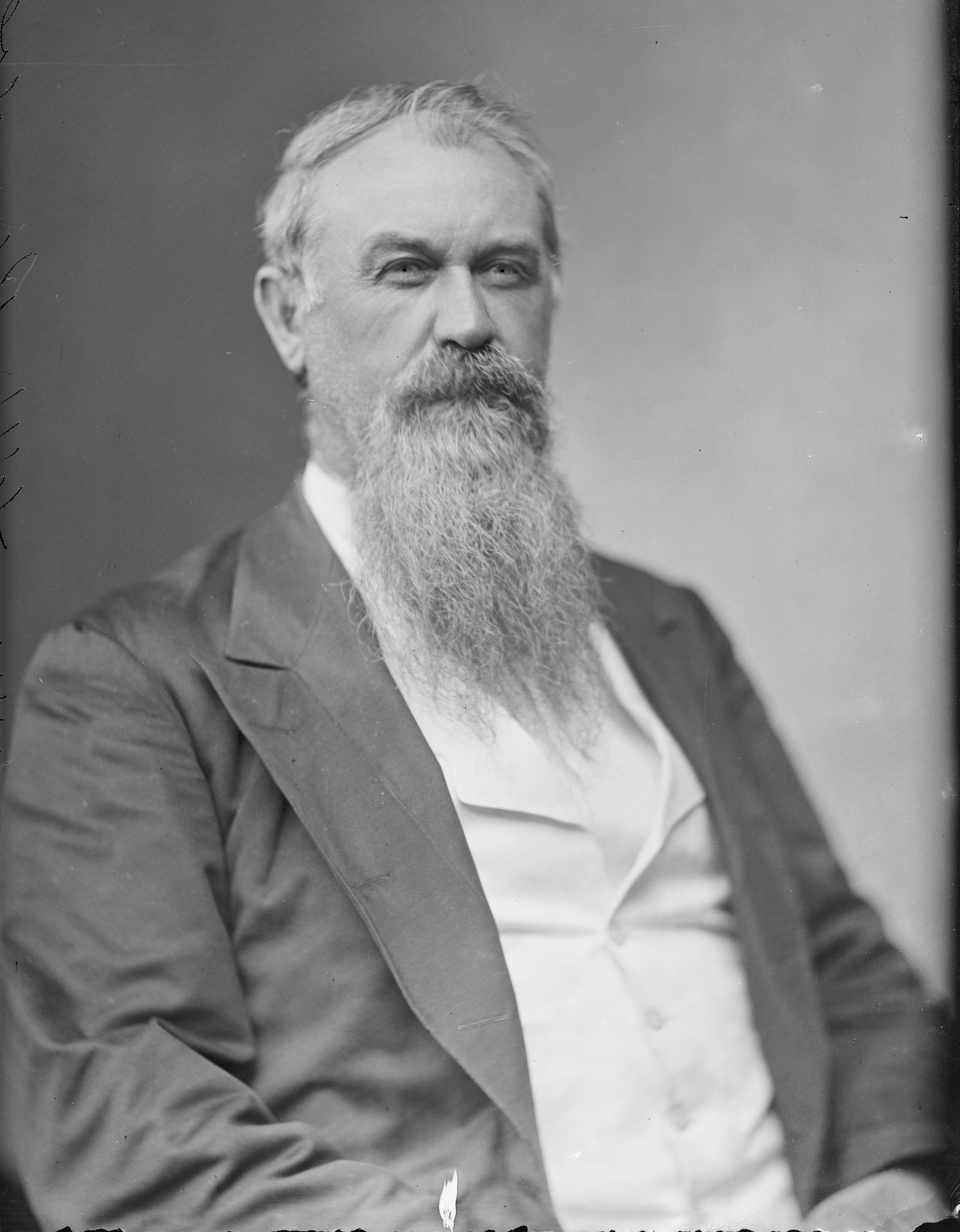

Member of the U.S. House of Representatives from Tennessee's 1st district
- In office March 4, 1877 – March 3, 1879
- Preceded by: William McFarland
- Succeeded by: Robert Love Taylor

Member of the Tennessee Senate
- In office 1865

Member of the Tennessee House of Representatives
- In office 1857–1861

Personal details
- Born: October 18, 1825 Jefferson County, Tennessee
- Died: August 22, 1900 (aged 74) Newport, Tennessee
- Party: Republican
- Spouse: Melinda Jane Robinson Randolph
- Children: William H. Randolph; Ralph Montgomery Randolph; Townzella Randolph
- Education: Holston College
- Profession: lawyer; judge; politician; farmer; miller

James Henry Randolph (October 18, 1825 – August 22, 1900) was an American politician and a member of the United States House of Representatives for the 1st congressional district of Tennessee.

== Biography ==
Born near Dandridge, Tennessee in Jefferson County on October 18, 1825, Randolph was the son of James Montgomery and Nancy Goan Randolph. He attended New Market Academy and graduated from Holston College in New Market, Tennessee. He studied law, was admitted to the bar in 1850, and commenced practice in Dandridge, Tennessee. He married Melinda Jane Robinson and they had three children, William H., Ralph Montgomery, and Townzella.

== Career ==
Randolph was a member of the Tennessee House of Representatives in 1857, 1858, 1859, 1860, and 1861. He served in the Tennessee Senate in 1865. He was elected judge of the second judicial circuit of Tennessee in 1869. He was re-elected after the Tennessee state constitutional convention in 1870.

Elected as a Republican to the Forty-fifth Congress, Randolph served from March 4, 1877, to March 3, 1879. He engaged in agricultural pursuits and milling.

== Death ==
Randolph died on August 22, 1900 (age 74 years, 308 days) in Newport, Tennessee in Cocke County. He is interred at Union Cemetery.

U.S. House of Representatives
Preceded by William McFarland	Member of the U.S. House of Representatives from Tennessee's 1st congressional district 1877–1879	Succeeded by Robert L. Taylor
