= 1896 Tennessee gubernatorial election =

- November 3, 1896
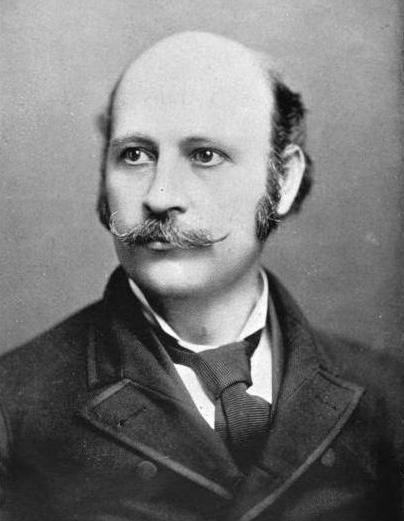

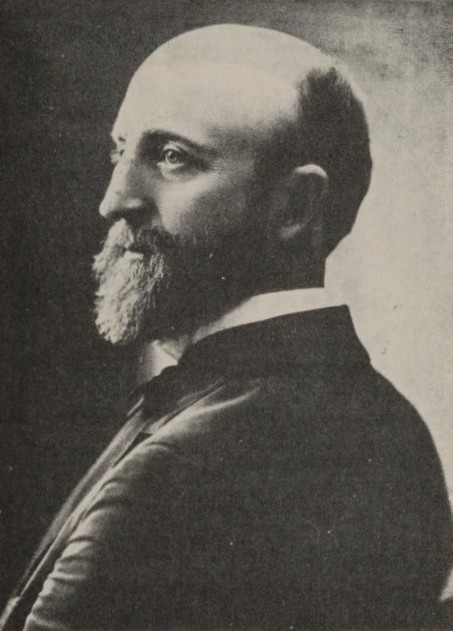
Nominee	Robert Love Taylor	G. N. Tillman
Party	Democratic	Republican
Popular vote	156,227	149,374
Percentage	48.75%	46.61%
- County results Taylor: 50–60% 60–70% 70–80% 80–90% >90% Tillman: 50–60% 60–70% 70–80% 80–90%
Governor before election
Peter Turney
Democratic
Elected Governor
Robert Love Taylor
Democratic

The 1896 Tennessee gubernatorial election was held on November 3, 1896. Former Democratic governor Robert Love Taylor narrowly defeated Republican nominee G. N. Tillman with 48.75% of the vote.

The Democratic Party was concerned about Republicans' chances of winning the governor's office and believed that the incumbent, Peter Turney, had won the office by using questionable tactics two years earlier. When several Democratic leaders invited Taylor to run, he reluctantly agreed and defeated Turney for the party's nomination in August 1896.

After Taylor narrowly won in the fierce general election campaign, Republicans suggested voting irregularities had helped Taylor win. However, the Democratic-dominated state legislature obstructed any attempt at an investigation.

== General election ==
=== Candidates ===
Major party candidates

- Robert Love Taylor, Democratic
- G. N. Tillman, Republican

Other candidates

- A. L. Mims, People's
- Josephus Hopwood, Prohibition

=== Results ===
1896 Tennessee gubernatorial election
Party	Candidate	Votes	%	±%
Democratic	Robert Love Taylor	156,227	48.75%	
Republican	G. N. Tillman	149,374	46.61%	
Populist	A. L. Mims	11,971	3.74%	
Prohibition	Josephus Hopwood	2,894	0.90%	
Majority		6,853		
Turnout				
Democratic hold		Swing		

== See also ==
- 1896 United States presidential election in Tennessee
