= 1888 United States presidential election in Tennessee =

- November 6, 1888
- Turnout: 19.69% of the total population ▲2.83 pp
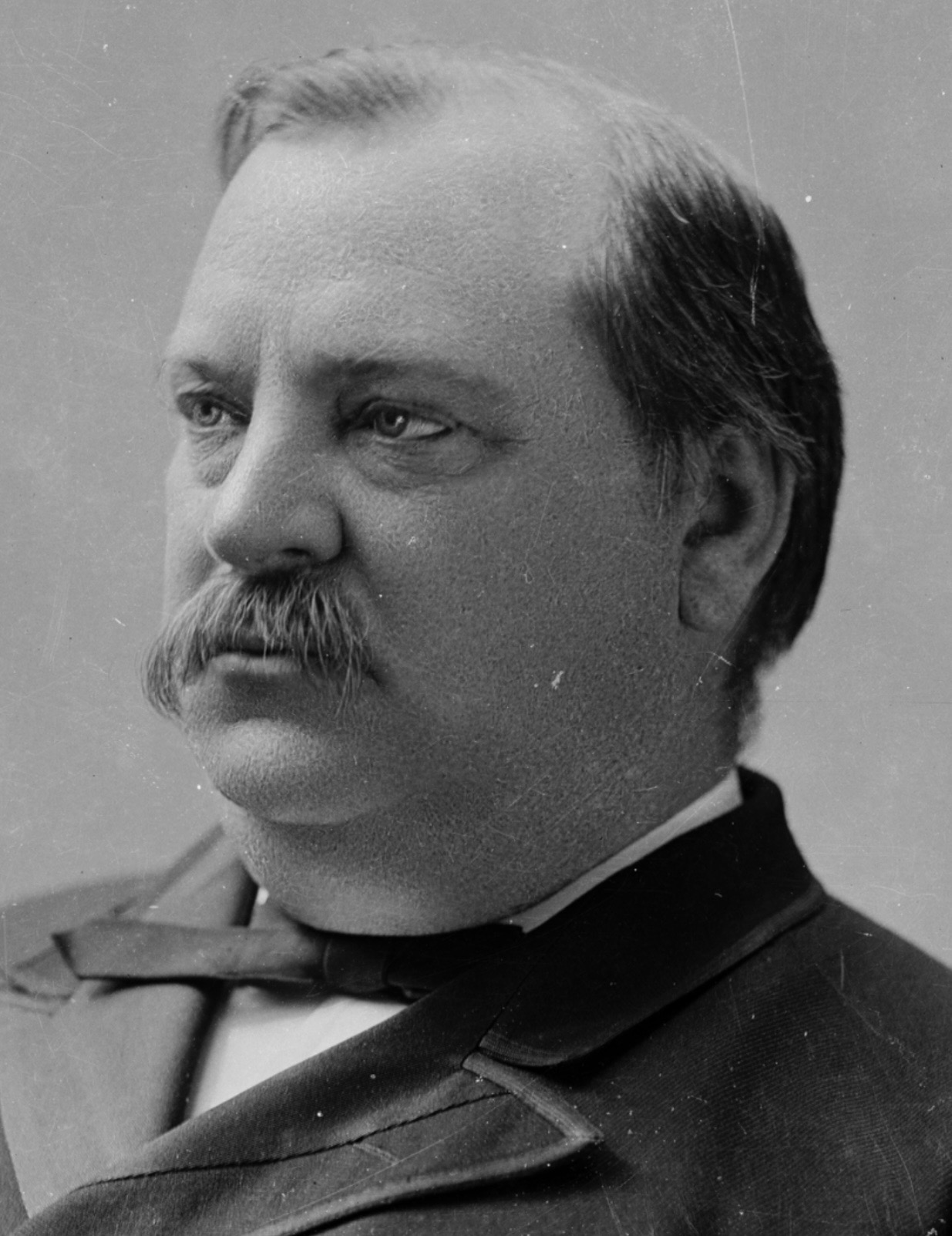

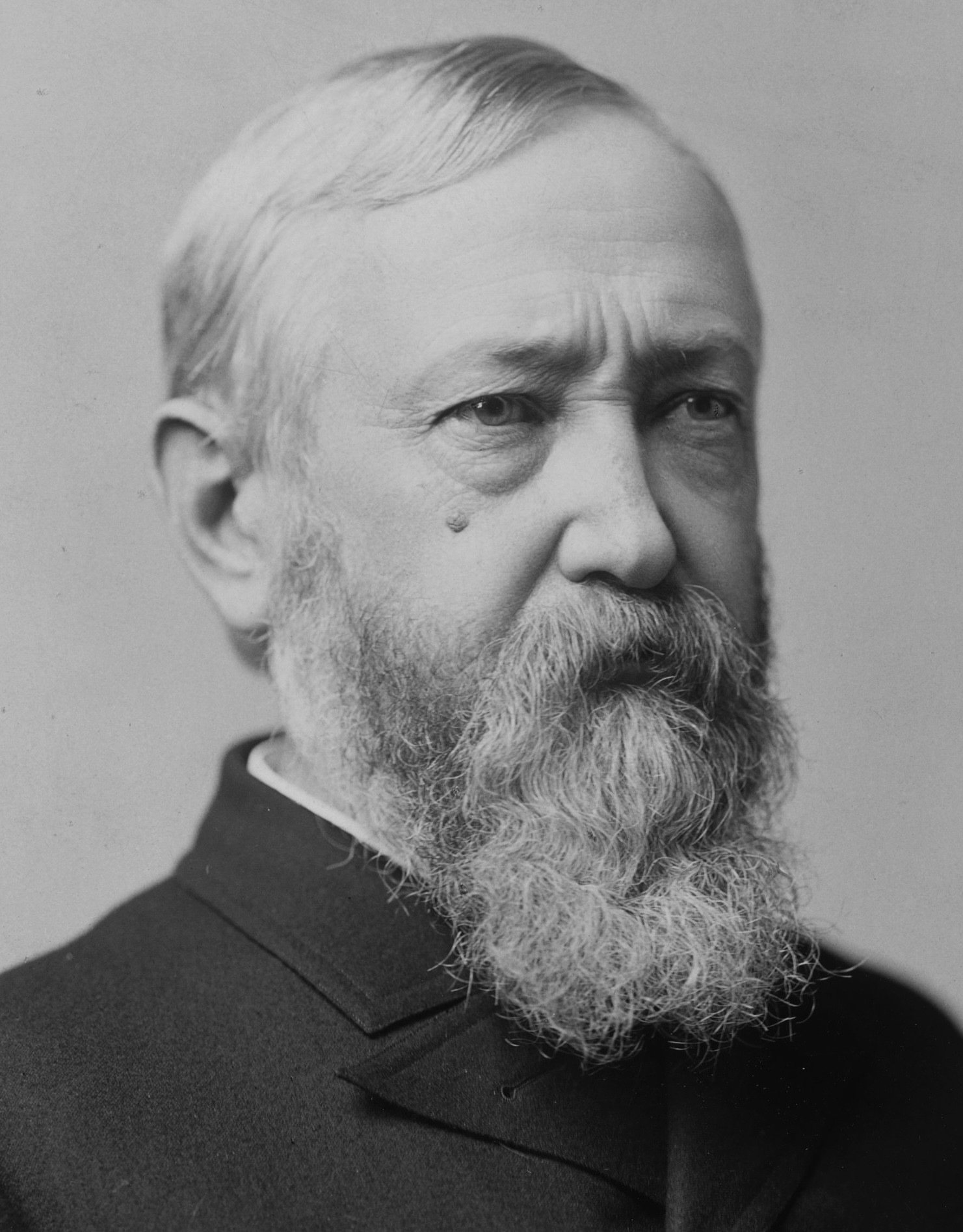
Nominee	Grover Cleveland	Benjamin Harrison
Party	Democratic	Republican
Home state	New York	Indiana
Running mate	Allen Thurman	Levi P. Morton
Electoral vote	12	0
Popular vote	158,699	138,978
Percentage	52.26%	45.76%
County results
Cleveland
40–50%
50–60%
60–70%
70–80%
80–90%
Harrison
50–60%
60–70%
70–80%
80–90%
Unknown/No Vote
President before election
Grover Cleveland
Democratic
Elected President
Benjamin Harrison
Republican

The 1888 United States presidential election in Tennessee took place on November 6, 1888, as part of the 1888 United States presidential election. Voters chose 12 representatives, or electors, to the Electoral College, who voted for president and vice president.

For over a century after the Civil War, Tennessee's white citizenry was divided according to partisan loyalties established in that war. Unionist regions covering almost all of East Tennessee, Kentucky Pennyroyal-allied Macon County, and the five West Tennessee Highland Rim counties of Carroll, Henderson, McNairy, Hardin and Wayne voted Republican – generally by landslide margins – as they saw the Democratic Party as the “war party” who had forced them into a war they did not wish to fight. Contrariwise, the rest of Middle and West Tennessee who had supported and driven the state's secession was equally fiercely Democratic as it associated the Republicans with Reconstruction. After the state's white landowning class re-established its rule in the early 1870s, black and Unionist white combined to forge adequate support for the GOP to produce a competitive political system for two decades, although during this era the Republicans could only capture statewide offices when the Democratic Party was divided on this issue of payment of state debt.

White Democrats in West Tennessee were always aiming to eliminate black political influence, and during the 1880s they attempted to do this by election fraud and stuffing of ballot boxes. During the 1888 elections, this fraud increased substantially and the GOP's fortunes showed a decline at the state level to just 35 out of 132 state legislators. This would lead to much more drastic changes in the future, but in the presidential race Democratic nominee and incumbent President Grover Cleveland, running with the former Senator and Chief Justice of the Supreme Court of Ohio Allen G. Thurman won only 52.26 percent of the popular vote, against former Indiana Senator Benjamin Harrison (R-Indiana), running with Levi P. Morton, the 31st governor of New York who gained 45.76 percent. Cleveland's margin was, given the political changes taking place, only a small improvement over his 1884 win in Tennessee; however, he did re-establish the majority-black far southwestern part of the state as rock-ribbed Democratic until the party turned towards Civil Rights under Harry S. Truman.

The Union Labor Party chose Alson Streeter, a former Illinois state representative, and Charles E. Cunningham as their presidential and vice-presidential candidates and received 0.02% of the vote. The Prohibition Party ran brigadier general Clinton B. Fisk and John A. Brooks and received 1.97% of the vote.

== Results ==
1888 United States presidential election in Tennessee
Party	Candidate	Votes	%
Democratic	Grover Cleveland (incumbent)	158,699	52.26%
Republican	Benjamin Harrison	138,978	45.76%
Prohibition	Clinton B. Fisk	5,969	1.97%
Union Labor	Alson Streeter	48 (Note: These Union Labor votes were not separated by county but listed only as a state-wide total.)	0.02%
Total votes		303,694	100.00%

=== Results by county ===
1888 United States presidential election in Tennessee by county
County	Grover Cleveland Democratic		Benjamin Harrison Republican		Clinton B. Fisk Prohibition		Margin		Total votes cast
County	#	%	#	%	#	%	#	%	Total votes cast
Anderson	733	29.59%	1,740	70.25%	4	0.16%	-1,007	-40.65%	2,477
Bedford	2,475	53.21%	1,988	42.74%	188	4.04%	487	10.47%	4,651
Benton	1,075	62.65%	640	37.30%	1	0.06%	435	25.35%	1,716
Bledsoe	482	42.47%	653	57.53%	0	0.00%	-171	-15.07%	1,135
Blount	1,009	30.55%	2,237	67.73%	57	1.73%	-1,228	-37.18%	3,303
Bradley	991	38.99%	1,518	59.72%	33	1.30%	-527	-20.73%	2,542
Campbell	559	23.20%	1,845	76.59%	5	0.21%	-1,286	-53.38%	2,409
Cannon	1,104	61.68%	658	36.76%	28	1.56%	446	24.92%	1,790
Carroll	1,875	43.74%	2,356	54.96%	56	1.31%	-481	-11.22%	4,287
Carter	453	19.22%	1,797	76.24%	107	4.54%	-1,344	-57.02%	2,357
Cheatham	1,063	75.50%	305	21.66%	40	2.84%	758	53.84%	1,408
Claiborne	959	40.29%	1,392	58.49%	29	1.22%	-433	-18.19%	2,380
Clay	749	60.80%	479	38.88%	4	0.32%	270	21.92%	1,232
Cocke	842	30.19%	1,947	69.81%	0	0.00%	-1,105	-39.62%	2,789
Coffee	1,818	75.09%	539	22.26%	64	2.64%	1,279	52.83%	2,421
Crockett	1,253	51.84%	1,080	44.68%	84	3.48%	173	7.16%	2,417
Cumberland	422	39.70%	632	59.45%	9	0.85%	-210	-19.76%	1,063
Davidson	9,715	49.15%	9,321	47.16%	730	3.69%	394	1.99%	19,766
DeKalb	1,462	51.88%	1,310	46.49%	46	1.63%	152	5.39%	2,818
Decatur	862	53.14%	757	46.67%	3	0.18%	105	6.47%	1,622
Dickson	1,511	64.38%	765	32.59%	71	3.03%	746	31.79%	2,347
Dyer	2,013	67.14%	925	30.85%	60	2.00%	1,088	36.29%	2,998
Fayette	3,813	79.54%	980	20.44%	1	0.02%	2,833	59.09%	4,794
Fentress	249	29.09%	602	70.33%	5	0.58%	-353	-41.24%	856
Franklin	2,362	74.42%	674	21.24%	138	4.35%	1,688	53.18%	3,174
Gibson	3,763	63.06%	1,893	31.72%	311	5.21%	1,870	31.34%	5,967
Giles	3,181	58.79%	2,100	38.81%	130	2.40%	1,081	19.98%	5,411
Grainger	931	39.52%	1,416	60.10%	9	0.38%	-485	-20.59%	2,356
Greene	2,195	42.97%	2,722	53.29%	191	3.74%	-527	-10.32%	5,108
Grundy	901	78.28%	216	18.77%	34	2.95%	685	59.51%	1,151
Hamblen	891	41.42%	1,219	56.67%	41	1.91%	-328	-15.25%	2,151
Hamilton	3,906	37.81%	6,264	60.63%	161	1.56%	-2,358	-22.82%	10,331
Hancock	480	28.29%	1,216	71.66%	1	0.06%	-736	-43.37%	1,697
Hardeman	1,913	63.03%	1,099	36.21%	23	0.76%	814	26.82%	3,035
Hardin	1,208	39.99%	1,785	59.09%	28	0.93%	-577	-19.10%	3,021
Hawkins	1,624	41.46%	2,260	57.70%	33	0.84%	-636	-16.24%	3,917
Haywood	1,962	53.14%	1,724	46.70%	6	0.16%	238	6.45%	3,692
Henderson	1,512	45.93%	1,772	53.83%	8	0.24%	-260	-7.90%	3,292
Henry	2,103	62.55%	1,197	35.60%	62	1.84%	906	26.95%	3,362
Hickman	1,509	56.26%	1,137	42.39%	36	1.34%	372	13.87%	2,682
Houston	745	73.98%	259	25.72%	3	0.30%	486	48.26%	1,007
Humphreys	1,443	76.35%	395	20.90%	52	2.75%	1,048	55.45%	1,890
Jackson	1,585	74.24%	545	25.53%	5	0.23%	1,040	48.71%	2,135
James	308	34.26%	587	65.29%	4	0.44%	-279	-31.03%	899
Jefferson	806	25.43%	2,348	74.07%	16	0.50%	-1,542	-48.64%	3,170
Johnson	180	11.70%	1,347	87.52%	12	0.78%	-1,167	-75.83%	1,539
Knox	3,929	37.94%	6,123	59.12%	305	2.94%	-2,194	-21.18%	10,357
Lake	450	83.33%	59	10.93%	31	5.74%	391	72.41%	540
Lauderdale	1,838	55.76%	1,433	43.48%	25	0.76%	405	12.29%	3,296
Lawrence	1,089	62.66%	633	36.42%	16	0.92%	456	26.24%	1,738
Lewis	254	65.30%	132	33.93%	3	0.77%	122	31.36%	389
Lincoln	3,285	72.21%	1,082	23.79%	182	4.00%	2,203	48.43%	4,549
Loudon	530	30.13%	1,226	69.70%	3	0.17%	-696	-39.57%	1,759
Macon	879	43.91%	1,120	55.94%	3	0.15%	-241	-12.04%	2,002
Madison	3,206	67.47%	1,479	31.12%	67	1.41%	1,727	36.34%	4,752
Marion	1,198	44.68%	1,483	55.32%	0	0.00%	-285	-10.63%	2,681
Marshall	2,291	71.08%	786	24.39%	146	4.53%	1,505	46.70%	3,223
Maury	3,658	54.27%	2,836	42.08%	246	3.65%	822	12.20%	6,740
McMinn	1,364	40.92%	1,901	57.04%	68	2.04%	-537	-16.11%	3,333
McNairy	1,525	49.97%	1,511	49.51%	16	0.52%	14	0.46%	3,052
Meigs	740	55.31%	589	44.02%	9	0.67%	151	11.29%	1,338
Monroe	1,457	50.70%	1,399	48.68%	18	0.63%	58	2.02%	2,874
Montgomery	2,628	53.53%	2,164	44.08%	117	2.38%	464	9.45%	4,909
Moore	980	84.63%	102	8.81%	76	6.56%	878	75.82%	1,158
Morgan	369	29.52%	860	68.80%	21	1.68%	-491	-39.28%	1,250
Obion	2,987	70.10%	1,167	27.39%	107	2.51%	1,820	42.71%	4,261
Overton	1,188	64.88%	614	33.53%	29	1.58%	574	31.35%	1,831
Perry	849	61.57%	527	38.22%	3	0.22%	322	23.35%	1,379
Pickett	362	46.95%	409	53.05%	0	0.00%	-47	-6.10%	771
Polk	679	51.48%	635	48.14%	5	0.38%	44	3.34%	1,319
Putnam	1,361	62.15%	817	37.31%	12	0.55%	544	24.84%	2,190
Rhea	1,177	45.27%	1,414	54.38%	9	0.35%	-237	-9.12%	2,600
Roane	844	29.14%	2,042	70.51%	10	0.35%	-1,198	-41.37%	2,896
Robertson	2,203	63.20%	952	27.31%	331	9.50%	1,251	35.89%	3,486
Rutherford	3,302	55.07%	2,479	41.34%	215	3.59%	823	13.73%	5,996
Scott	164	10.35%	1,418	89.46%	3	0.19%	-1,254	-79.12%	1,585
Sequatchie	350	66.04%	180	33.96%	0	0.00%	170	32.08%	530
Sevier	489	14.56%	2,830	84.25%	40	1.19%	-2,341	-69.69%	3,359
Shelby	11,932	58.86%	8,277	40.83%	64	0.32%	3,655	18.03%	20,273
Smith	2,108	64.96%	1,102	33.96%	35	1.08%	1,006	31.00%	3,245
Stewart	1,277	69.29%	536	29.08%	30	1.63%	741	40.21%	1,843
Sullivan	2,255	58.66%	1,513	39.36%	76	1.98%	742	19.30%	3,844
Sumner	2,778	68.76%	1,228	30.40%	34	0.84%	1,550	38.37%	4,040
Tipton	2,351	61.21%	1,486	38.69%	4	0.10%	865	22.52%	3,841
Trousdale	792	71.29%	316	28.44%	3	0.27%	476	42.84%	1,111
Unicoi	85	11.55%	645	87.64%	6	0.82%	-560	-76.09%	736
Union	523	25.55%	1,501	73.33%	23	1.12%	-978	-47.78%	2,047
Van Buren	423	77.05%	103	18.76%	23	4.19%	320	58.29%	549
Warren	1,975	73.80%	636	23.77%	65	2.43%	1,339	50.04%	2,676
Washington	1,534	42.12%	2,008	55.13%	100	2.75%	-474	-13.01%	3,642
Wayne	772	39.03%	1,204	60.87%	2	0.10%	-432	-21.84%	1,978
Weakley	2,764	60.22%	1,764	38.43%	62	1.35%	1,000	21.79%	4,590
White	1,634	76.36%	449	20.98%	57	2.66%	1,185	55.37%	2,140
Williamson	2,358	58.85%	1,491	37.21%	158	3.94%	867	21.64%	4,007
Wilson	2,518	57.55%	1,676	38.31%	181	4.14%	842	19.25%	4,375
Totals	158,699	52.26%	138,978	45.77%	5,968	1.97%	19,721	6.49%	303,645

== See also ==
- United States presidential elections in Tennessee
- 1888 Tennessee gubernatorial election
