= 1910 Tennessee gubernatorial election =

- November 8, 1910
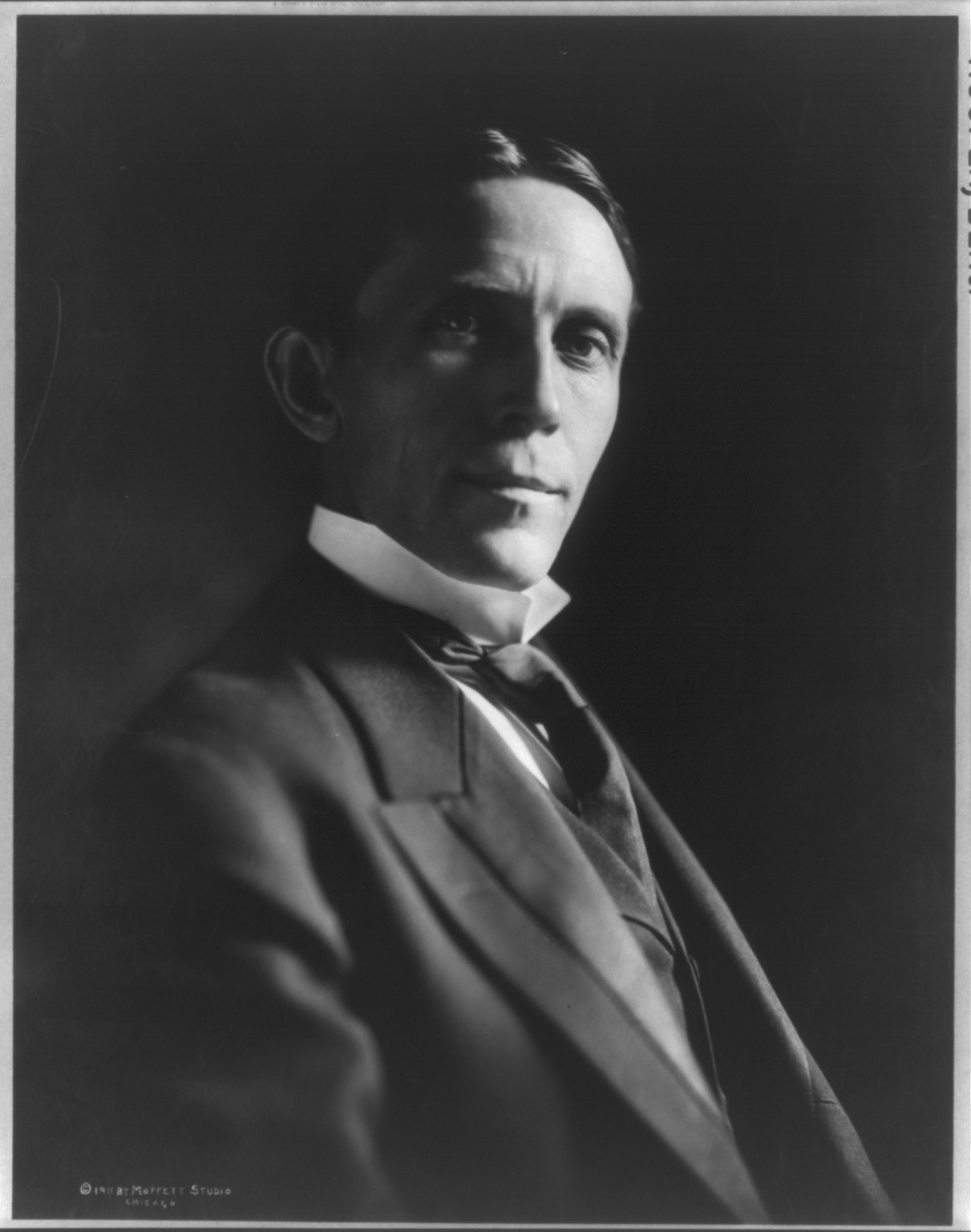

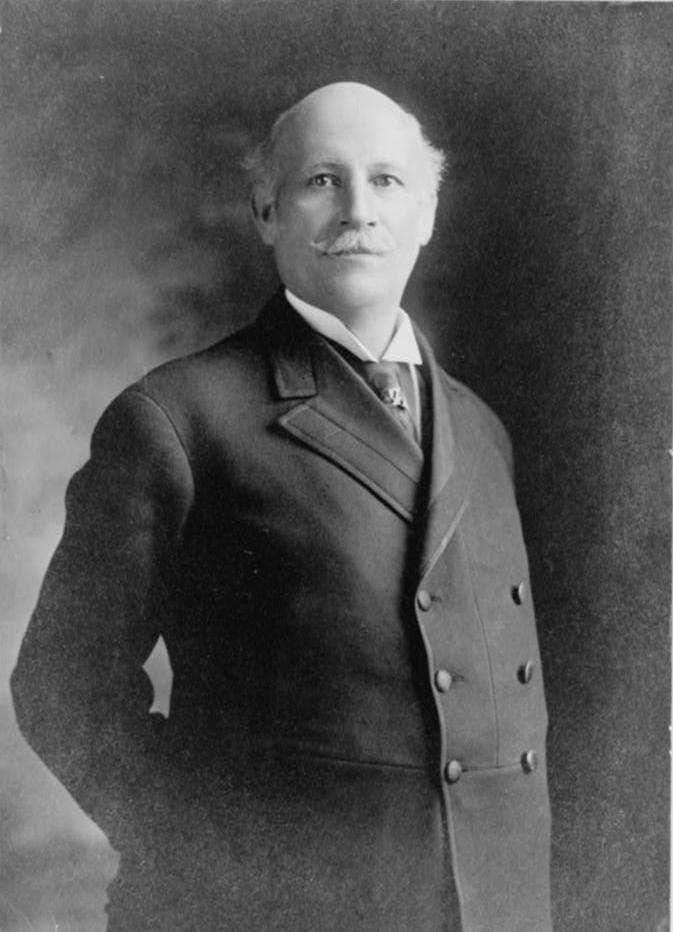
| Nominee | Ben W. Hooper | Robert Love Taylor |
| Party | Republican | Democratic |
| Popular vote | 133,076 | 121,694 |
| Percentage | 51.89% | 47.45% |
- County results Hooper: 40–50% 50–60% 60–70% 70–80% 80–90% >90% Taylor: 40–50% 50–60% 60–70% 70–80% 80–90%
Governor before election
Malcolm R. Patterson
Democratic
Elected Governor
Ben W. Hooper
Republican

The 1910 Tennessee gubernatorial election was held on November 8, 1910. Incumbent Democratic governor Malcolm R. Patterson initially sought a third term but withdrew from the race after securing his party's nomination. Senator and former Democratic governor Robert Love Taylor was nominated after Patterson's withdrawal. On the Republican side, Ben W. Hooper defeated Alfred A. Taylor, Robert's brother, for the Republican nomination. In the general election, Ben W. Hooper defeated Robert Love Taylor with 51.89% of the vote.

== Background ==
By 1910, Tennessee's Democratic Party was deeply divided over two major issues: state primaries and prohibition. One faction, led by governor Malcolm R. Patterson, sought to maintain the existing system of awarding delegates by county, while the opposing "Statewiders" pushed for a statewide primary. Simultaneously, a prohibition rift had developed, with Patterson favoring major cities' exemption from the state's Four Mile Law, which banned liquor sales near schools, while Edward W. Carmack's faction sought statewide prohibition. Tensions escalated when Carmack was killed in 1908, and Patterson's controversial pardon of one of the killers in 1910 exacerbated the divide.

When Patterson refused to consider a statewide primary, the Statewiders withdrew from the convention and nominated their own slate of candidates, which allowed Patterson to secure the nomination. However, Patterson's attempt to control the party's primary process led many Democrats to abandon the party—including Francis Gracey Childers—and run as independents, becoming known as the "Independent Democrats." In the August 4 state judicial elections, the Statewiders, running as independents, defeated Patterson's "Regular Democrats" faction.

Meanwhile, Tennessee's Republican Party was also divided, with Walter P. Brownlow's faction supporting Alfred A. Taylor, brother of former Democratic governor Robert Love Taylor, and Newell Sanders’ faction backing Ben W. Hooper. The Sanders faction allied with the Independent Democrats to form the "Fusionists" and successfully secured Hooper's nomination.

Realizing his slim chances in the general election, Patterson withdrew from the race. His faction quickly nominated U.S. Senator and former governor Robert Love Taylor in hopes of uniting the party. Despite this, without the support of the Statewiders, Taylor was defeated by Hooper in the general election, marking a significant shift in Tennessee's political landscape.

== General election ==
=== Candidates ===
Major party candidates

- Ben W. Hooper, Republican
- Robert Love Taylor, Democratic

Other candidates

- Seth McCallen, Socialist

=== Results ===
1910 Tennessee gubernatorial election
| Party | Candidate | Votes | % | ±% |
|---|---|---|---|---|
| Republican | Ben W. Hooper | 133,076 | 51.89% | |
| Democratic | Robert Love Taylor | 121,694 | 47.45% | |
| Socialist | Seth McCallen | 1,707 | 0.67% | |
| Majority | | 11,382 | | |
| Turnout | | | | |
| Republican gain from Democratic | | Swing | | |
