= 1886 Tennessee gubernatorial election =

- November 2, 1886
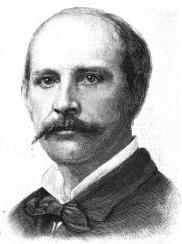

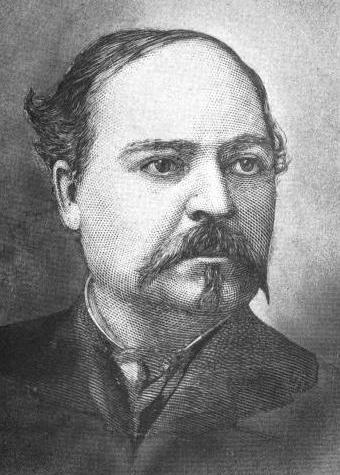
Nominee	Robert Love Taylor	Alfred A. Taylor
Party	Democratic	Republican
Popular vote	126,491	109,842
Percentage	53.52%	46.48%
- County results Love Taylor: 40–50% 50–60% 60–70% 70–80% 80–90% >90% A. Taylor: 50–60% 60–70% 70–80% 80–90% No data
Governor before election
William B. Bate
Democratic
Elected Governor
Robert Love Taylor
Democratic

The 1886 Tennessee gubernatorial election was held in the US state on November 2, 1886. Democratic nominee Robert Love Taylor defeated his brother, Republican nominee Alfred A. Taylor with 53.52% of the vote.

The gubernatorial campaign is remembered for the Taylor brothers' relatively light-hearted political banter and entertaining speeches. Canvassing together, they spent the first part of each campaign stop "cussing out each other's politics" and telling stories and the second part playing fiddle tunes while the crowd danced. At a stop in Madisonville, Robert suggested that both he and Alfred were roses, but he was a white rose while Alfred was a red rose. As their respective supporters subsequently wore white and red roses, the campaign became known as the "War of the Roses" (the name also referred to the 15th-century English conflict). Their campaign stops drew massive crowds, ranging from around 6,000 in smaller towns to 25,000 in Nashville.

There was record turnout on election day, when Robert Taylor defeated Alfred by around 16,000 votes.

== General election ==
=== Candidates ===
- Robert Love Taylor, Democratic
- Alfred A. Taylor, Republican

=== Results ===
1886 Tennessee gubernatorial election
Party	Candidate	Votes	%	±%
Democratic	Robert Love Taylor	126,491	53.52%	
Republican	Alfred A. Taylor	109,842	46.48%	
Majority		16,649		
Turnout				
Democratic hold		Swing		
