= 1888 Tennessee gubernatorial election =

- November 6, 1888
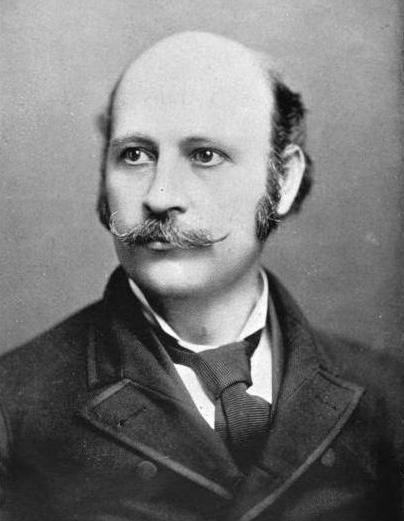

Nominee	Robert Love Taylor	Samuel W. Hawkins
Party	Democratic	Republican
Popular vote	156,799	139,014
Percentage	51.78%	45.91%
- County results Taylor: 40–50% 50–60% 60–70% 70–80% 80–90% Hawkins: 50–60% 60–70% 70–80% 80–90% No data
Governor before election
Robert Love Taylor
Democratic
Elected Governor
Robert Love Taylor
Democratic

The 1888 Tennessee gubernatorial election was held on November 6, 1888. Incumbent Democratic governor Robert Love Taylor defeated Republican nominee Samuel W. Hawkins with 51.78% of the vote.

== General election ==
=== Candidates ===
Major party candidates

- Robert Love Taylor, Democratic
- Samuel W. Hawkins, Republican

Other candidates

- J. C. Johnson, Prohibition

=== Results ===
1888 Tennessee gubernatorial election
Party	Candidate	Votes	%	±%
Democratic	Robert Love Taylor (incumbent)	156,799	51.78%	
Republican	Samuel W. Hawkins	139,014	45.91%	
Prohibition	J. C. Johnson	6,983	2.31%	
Majority		17,785		
Turnout				
Democratic hold		Swing		

== See also ==
- 1888 United States presidential election in Tennessee
