= Robert Love Taylor =

American politician (1850–1912)

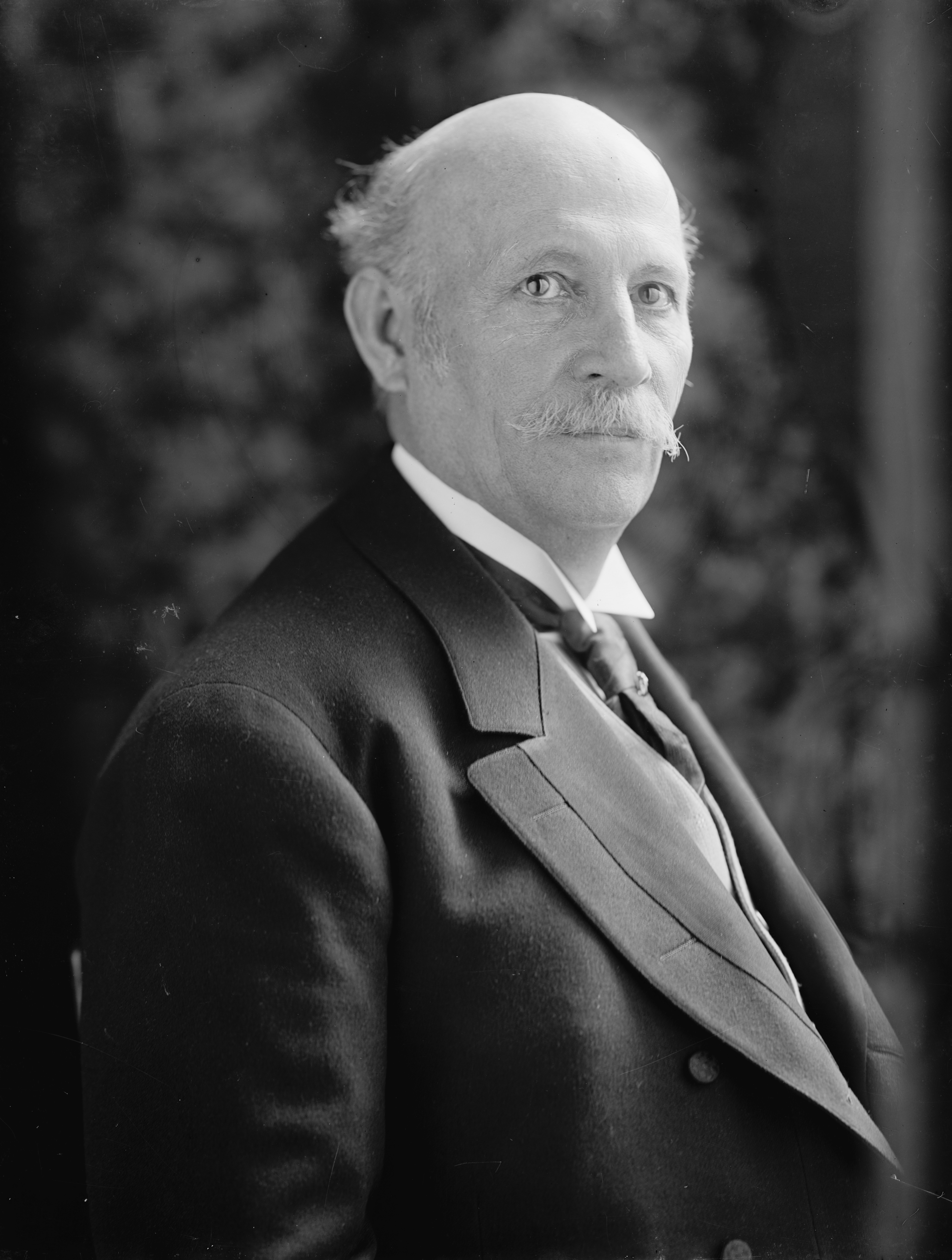
- Photograph by Harris & Ewing, c. 1905-1912

24th Governor of Tennessee
- In office January 17, 1887 – January 19, 1891
- Preceded by: William B. Bate
- Succeeded by: John P. Buchanan
- In office January 21, 1897 – January 16, 1899
- Preceded by: Peter Turney
- Succeeded by: Benton McMillin

United States Senator from Tennessee
- In office March 4, 1907 – March 31, 1912
- Preceded by: Edward W. Carmack
- Succeeded by: Newell Sanders

Member of the U.S. House of Representatives from Tennessee's 1st district
- In office March 4, 1879 – March 3, 1881
- Preceded by: James H. Randolph
- Succeeded by: Augustus H. Pettibone

Personal details
- Born: July 31, 1850 Carter County, Tennessee, US
- Died: March 31, 1912 (aged 61) Washington, D.C., US
- Resting place: Monte Vista Memorial Park, Johnson City, Tennessee
- Party: Democratic
- Spouse(s): Sarah Baird; Alice Hill; Mamie St. John
- Relations: Nathaniel Green Taylor (father); Alfred A. Taylor (brother); Landon Carter Haynes (uncle); Nathaniel Edwin Harris (cousin); Peter Taylor (grandson)
- Profession: Attorney, lecturer, editor

Robert Love Taylor (July 31, 1850 – March 31, 1912) was an American politician, writer, and lecturer. A member of the Democratic Party, he served three terms as the 24th governor of Tennessee, from 1887 to 1891, and again from 1897 to 1899, and subsequently served as a United States senator from 1907 until his death. He also represented Tennessee's 1st district in the United States House of Representatives from 1879 to 1881, the last Democrat to hold the district's seat.

A charismatic speaker, Taylor is remembered for defeating his older brother, Alfred A. "Alf" Taylor, in the 1886 gubernatorial campaign known as "The War of the Roses." The campaign involved storytelling, fiddle-playing, and practical jokes, standing in contrast to the state's previous gubernatorial campaigns, which typically involved fierce rhetoric and personal attacks. Though Robert Taylor won in 1886, Alfred Taylor was elected as governor in the early 1920s.

Along with politics, Taylor was a public lecturer and magazine editor. He published several collections of his lectures and short stories in the 1890s and early 1900s, and was co-editor of the Taylor-Trotwood Magazine.

== Early life and career ==
Taylor was born in Happy Valley, Carter County, Tennessee, the third son of Nathaniel Green Taylor, a Methodist minister, and Emmaline Haynes, an accomplished pianist. His father, a member of the Whig Party, had been defeated by Andrew Johnson in a campaign for Congress in 1849 but would win the seat in the mid-1850s. His mother's family supported the Democratic Party, and her brother, Landon Carter Haynes, was a prominent Democratic politician. Robert Taylor would adopt his mother's political leanings and become a Democrat, and his older brother, Alfred, would follow his father into the Whig (and later Republican) Party.

Nathaniel Taylor supported the Union during the Civil War, and the family moved to Philadelphia in 1861 when Tennessee seceded and the Confederate Army occupied East Tennessee. In 1864, the Taylor brothers enrolled in Pennington Seminary in New Jersey. The family moved to Washington in 1867 when Nathaniel Taylor was appointed as Commissioner of Indian Affairs by President Andrew Johnson. Robert Taylor took a position in the Treasury Department. The family returned to Tennessee in 1869, where Robert would attend Buffalo Institute (modern Milligan College) and East Tennessee Wesleyan College. While at the former, he cowrote a play with his brother, Alfred.

In the 1870s, Taylor tried several business ventures, including farming, operating a lumber mill, and managing his father's Doe River iron forge. He largely failed at all of those, however, since he was reckless with money, overpaid his employees, and preferred conversation and storytelling to working. He read law during this period with S.J. Kirkpatrick in Jonesborough.

In 1878, Alfred Taylor ran for the Republican nomination for Tennessee's 1st congressional district seat against Augustus H. Pettibone. At the party's convention, Alfred appeared to have more delegates, but Pettibone managed to win the nomination, which led Alfred's supporters to suspect corruption. Robert Taylor was convinced to run against Pettibone on the Democratic ticket in the general election. The public got its first real taste of his speaking ability at a debate in Bristol, when Taylor thrashed Pettibone with a "bewildering kaleidoscope of oratory." With help from Alfred's disgruntled supporters, Robert edged Pettibone for the seat by 750 votes. Legislation sponsored by Taylor included a bill calling for a federal income tax.

Taylor was defeated by Pettibone in his re-election campaign in 1880 and lost to Pettibone a third time when he tried to regain the seat in 1882. He launched a pro-Democratic Party newspaper, The Comet, in nearby Johnson City. In 1884, Taylor was named the elector from the 1st district for Democratic presidential candidate Grover Cleveland, and campaigned across the district against the Republican elector, Samuel Hawkins. After Cleveland won the election, he appointed Taylor as federal pension agent in Knoxville.

== Governor ==
In 1886, Republicans, hoping to exploit divisions in the Democratic Party between the pro-farmer and Bourbon factions, nominated Alfred Taylor for governor. (The office then had a two-year term.) Democrats, realizing they needed a unifier and effective campaigner to counter Alfred, nominated Robert Taylor as their candidate, pitting the two brothers against one another. The Prohibition Party offered its nomination to the Taylors' father, Nathaniel, but he declined.

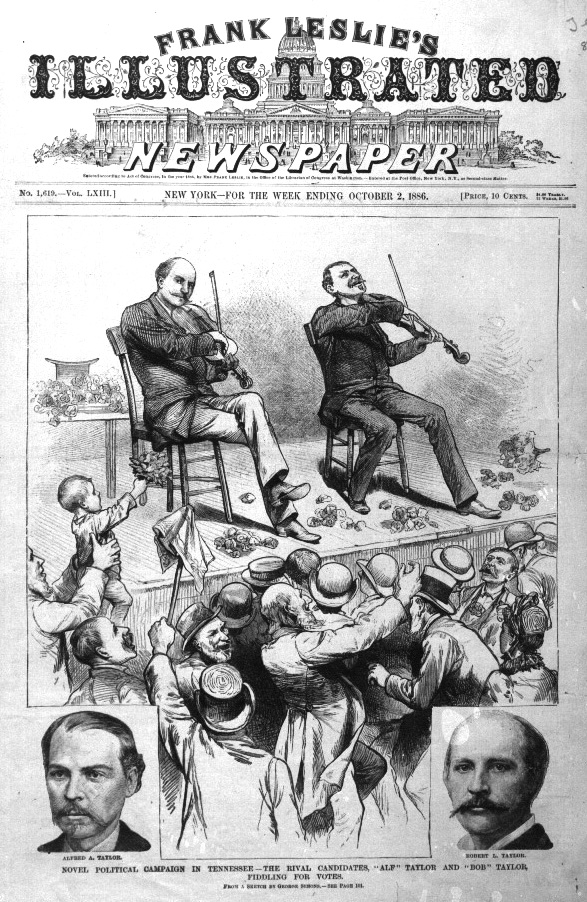
The Taylors' 1886 campaign, as depicted on the cover of the October 2, 1886 issue of Frank Leslie's Illustrated Newspaper

The 1886 gubernatorial campaign is remembered for the Taylor brothers' relatively light-hearted political banter and entertaining speeches. Canvassing together, they spent the first part of each campaign stop "cussing out each other's politics" and telling stories and the second part playing fiddle tunes while the crowd danced. At a stop in Madisonville, Robert suggested that both he and Alfred were roses, but he was a white rose while Alfred was a red rose. As their respective supporters subsequently wore white and red roses, the campaign became known as the "War of the Roses" (the name also referred to the 15th-century English conflict). Their campaign stops drew massive crowds, ranging from around 6,000 in smaller towns to 25,000 in Nashville. In a record turnout on election day, Robert Taylor defeated Alfred by 16,000 votes.

Although Taylor was uncomfortable with the criticism and attacks that came with the executive office, he succeeded in enacting both tax and educational reform. He was assailed for issuing too many pardons and demanded for the state to build a reformatory for juveniles. When he did not gain legislative approval for such a reformatory, he issued a pardon to virtually every juvenile who sought one. In 1888, an angry Bourbon faction sought to thwart his nomination for re-election but was unsuccessful. He won the general election later that year, with 156,799 votes to 139,014 for the Republican candidate, Samuel Hawkins, and 6,893 for the Prohibition candidate, J.C. Johnson.

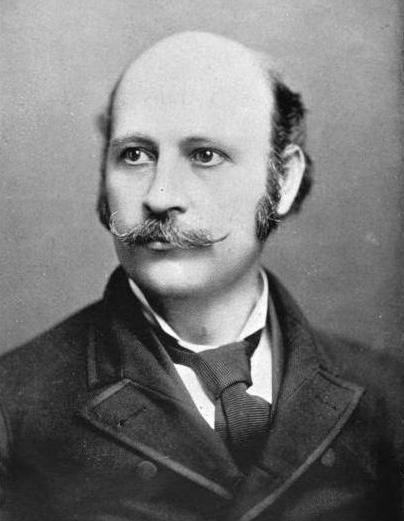
Taylor, photographed during the Tennessee Centennial

In 1889, Taylor signed into law a poll tax and a number of other bills aimed at suppressing turnout among blacks and the poor. A number of prohibition laws were also repealed. Suffering from ill health and disenchanted by divisions within his own party, he did not seek re-election in 1890.

In the early 1890s, Taylor, struggling with debt from constant campaigning, asked his brother, Alfred (who was now a US representative), for advice. Alfred suggested for Robert to go on a lecture tour and invited Robert's family to move in with his family until he got his finances in order. Robert opened his tour on December 29, 1891, at Jobe's Hall in Johnson City, where he presented his lecture, "The Fiddle and the Bow," with an admission price of 50 cents per person. After Alfred left Congress, he joined Robert on tour, and the two co-wrote and presented Yankee Doodle and Dixie. The tour was a major financial success by netting the brothers tens of thousands of dollars.

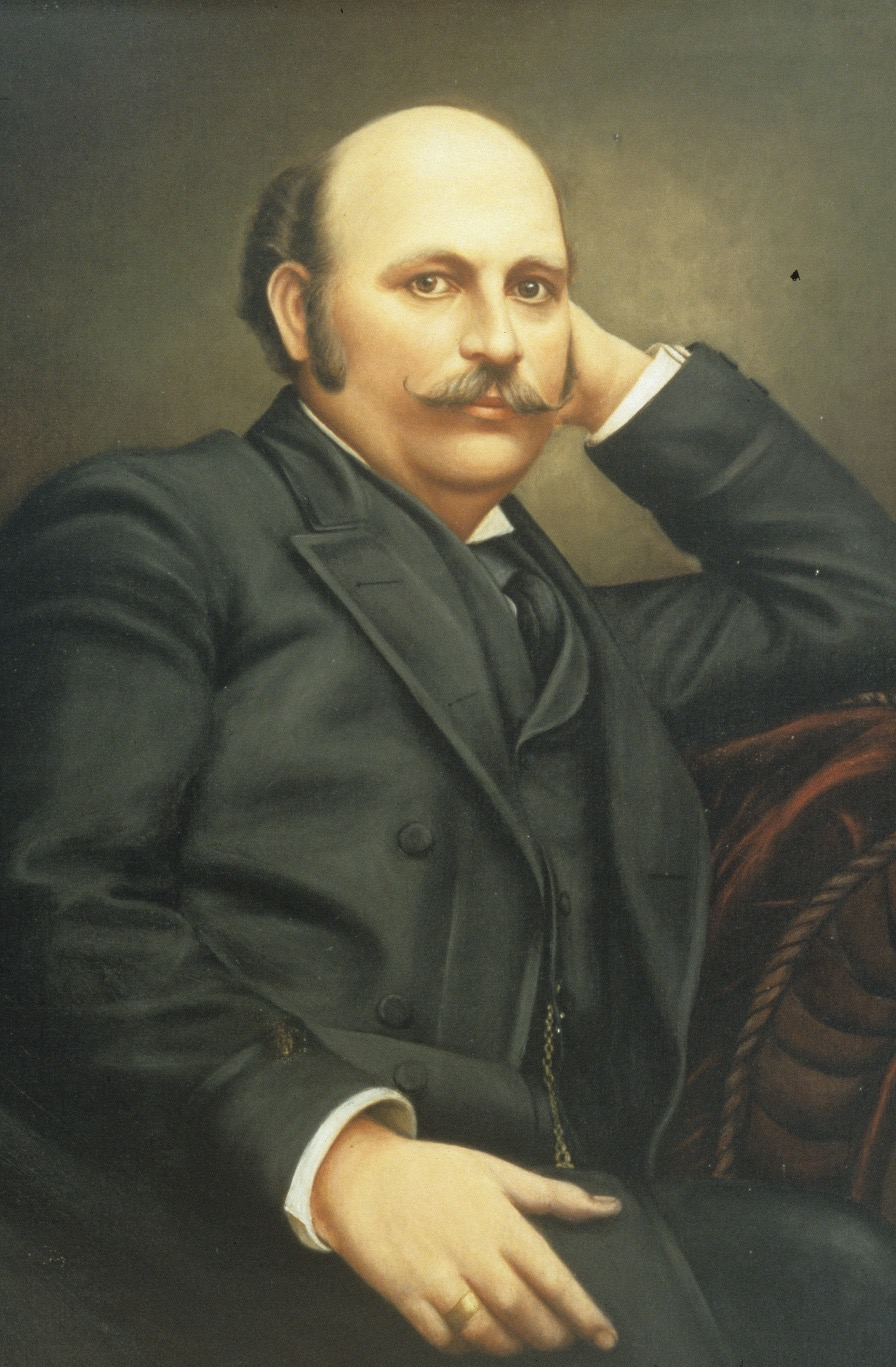
Portrait of Taylor as Governor

In 1896, the Democratic Party was again concerned about Republicans' chances of winning the governor's office and believed that the incumbent, Peter Turney, had won the office by using questionable tactics two years earlier. When several Democratic leaders invited Taylor to run, he reluctantly agreed and defeated Turney for the party's nomination in August 1896. After a fierce general election campaign, he edged the Republican candidate, George Tillman, with about 49% of the vote to Tillman's 47%. Republicans suggested voting irregularities had helped Taylor win, but the Democratic-dominated state legislature obstructed any attempt at an investigation.

The most notable event of Taylor's second term as governor was the Tennessee Centennial, which marked the 100th anniversary of the state's admission to the Union. The state celebrated by producing the Tennessee Centennial and International Exposition, a five-month world's fair held in Nashville's Centennial Park in 1897, with Taylor making numerous appearances.

== Later life ==
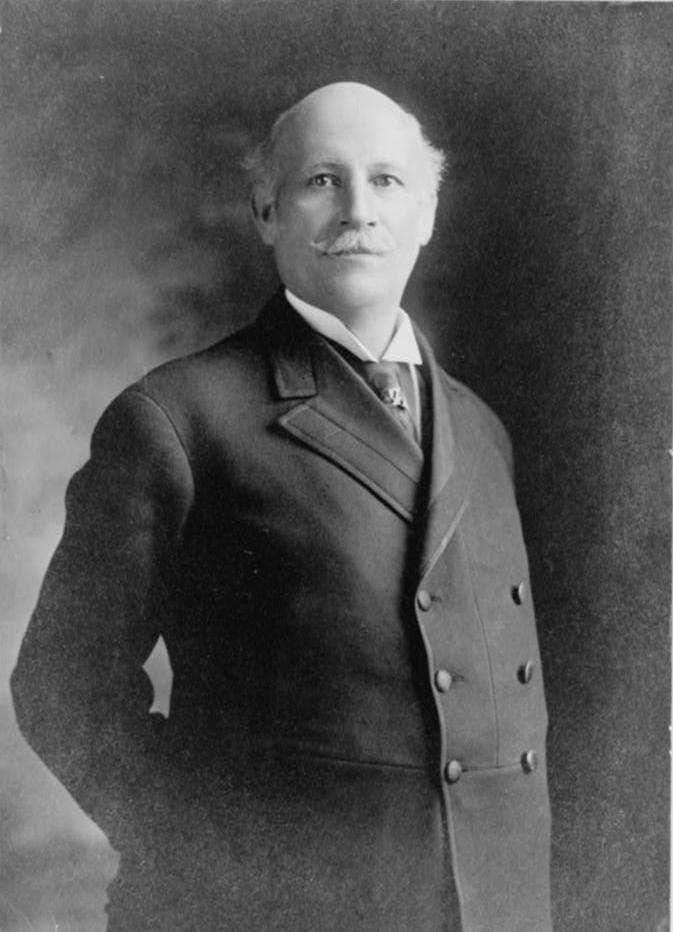
Senator Taylor, c. 1910

After his final term as governor, Taylor returned to the lecture circuit, though he continuously sought one of the state's US Senate seats, then elected by the legislature. In 1907, he defeated the incumbent Senator Edward W. Carmack in a public primary, and Taylor was elected by the state legislature to the seat later that year. He served from 1907 until his death in 1912. Some of the legislation that he supported was the Sixteenth Amendment, which authorized the federal government to levy income taxes. He helped secure the amendment's passage in the Senate in 1909.

In 1910, when incumbent Democratic Governor Malcolm R. Patterson withdrew from the state's gubernatorial contest because of the turmoil in the party over Prohibition, Taylor agreed to serve as a replacement nominee. He lost in the general election to the Republican nominee, Ben W. Hooper, who had defeated Taylor's brother, Alfred, for the Republican nomination earlier that year.

On March 31, 1912, Taylor suffered a gallstone attack and died following unsuccessful surgery at Providence Hospital in Washington. A specially chartered train carried his body to Nashville, where it lay in the capitol for several days. It was then taken to Knoxville, where a funeral procession of more than 40,000 people, the largest in the city's history, attended his burial at Old Gray Cemetery.

The remains of both Robert Love Taylor and his wife, Sarah Elizabeth Halbert Taylor, were removed from the Old Gray Cemetery in Knoxville on October 5, 1938 and later interred at the Monte Vista Memorial Park in Johnson City, Tennessee.

== Family ==
Taylor's great-grandfather, General Nathaniel Taylor (1771–1816), served during the War of 1812. Another great-grandfather, Landon Carter (1760–1800), was a Revolutionary War veteran for whom Carter County was named. Taylor's father, Nathaniel Green Taylor (1819–1887), served two terms in Congress (1853–1855 and 1866–1867), and published poetry and religious essays. Taylor's brother, Alfred, served three terms in the U.S. House of Representatives (1889–1895), and one term as Governor of Tennessee (1921–1923). Nathaniel Edwin Harris, who served as Governor of Georgia from 1915 to 1917, was a first cousin of Taylor.

Taylor married Sarah Baird in 1878, and they had five children. After she died in 1900, he married Alice Hill during September 1901. This second marriage ended in divorce after a few years. The Comet newspaper in Johnson City had reported on May 5, 1904 that Governor Taylor had been divorced from his wife who filed charges of "abandonment and desertion, and failure to provide" against Taylor.

Taylor was married for a third time to Mamie St. John in 1904. Taylor and Sarah's daughter Katherine Baird Taylor married Matthew Hillsman "Red" Taylor; their son Peter Taylor became an award-winning writer.

== Works ==
- Gov. Bob Taylor's Tales (1896)
- Echoes: Centennial and Other Notable Speeches, Lectures and Stories (1899)
- Lectures and Best Literary Productions of Bob Taylor (1900)
- Life Pictures (1907)

== See also ==
- List of governors of Tennessee
- List of members of the United States Congress who died in office (1900–1949)

Party political offices
Preceded by William B. Bate	Democratic nominee for Governor of Tennessee; 1886, 1888	Succeeded by John P. Buchanan
Preceded by Peter Turney	Democratic nominee for Governor of Tennessee; 1896	Succeeded by Benton McMillin
Preceded by Malcolm R. Patterson	Democratic nominee for Governor of Tennessee; 1910	Succeeded by Benton McMillin
U.S. House of Representatives
Preceded by James Henry Randolph	Member of the U.S. House of Representatives from Tennessee's 1st congressional district 1879–1881	Succeeded by Augustus Herman Pettibone
Political offices
Preceded by William B. Bate	Governor of Tennessee; 1887–1891	Succeeded by John P. Buchanan
Preceded by Peter Turney	Governor of Tennessee; 1897–1899	Succeeded by Benton McMillin
U.S. Senate
Preceded by Edward W. Carmack	U.S. senator (Class 2) from Tennessee; 1907–1911; Served alongside: James B. Frazier, Luke Lea	Succeeded by Newell Sanders
