= Index of Kentucky-related articles =

The location of the Commonwealth of Kentucky in the United States of America

The following is an alphabetical list of articles related to the United States Commonwealth of Kentucky.

== 0–9 ==
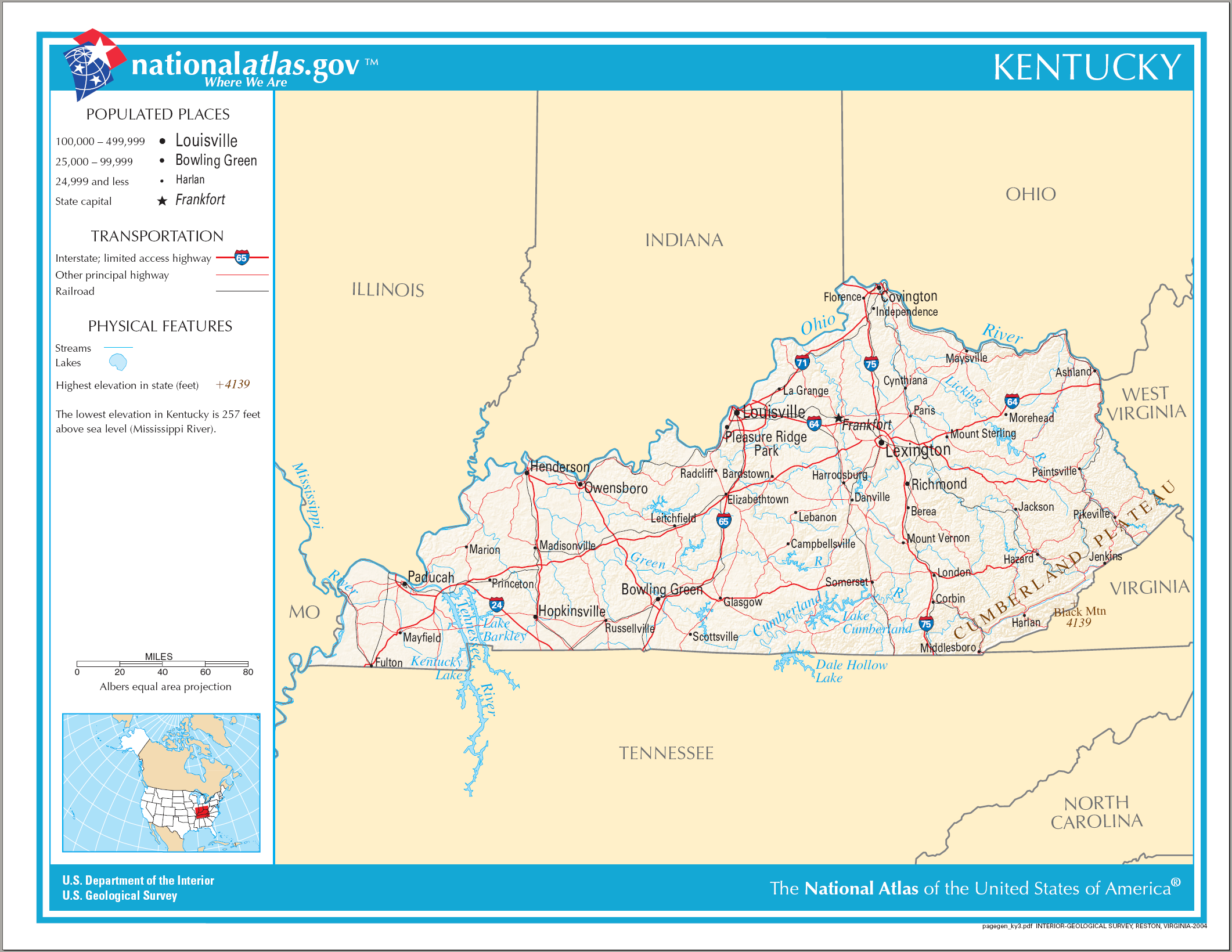
An enlargeable map of the Commonwealth of Kentucky

- .ky.us – Internet second-level domain for the Commonwealth of Kentucky
- 1st Kentucky Cavalry Regiment (Confederate)
- 1st Kentucky Infantry Regiment (Confederate)
- 1st Kentucky Infantry Regiment (Union)
- 2nd Kentucky Infantry Regiment (Confederate)
- 2nd Kentucky Infantry Regiment (Union)
- 3rd Kentucky Infantry Regiment (Confederate)
- 3rd Kentucky Infantry Regiment (Union)
- 4th Kentucky Infantry Regiment (Confederate)
- 4th Kentucky Infantry Regiment (Union)
- 5th Kentucky Infantry Regiment (Confederate)
- 5th Kentucky Infantry Regiment (Union)
- 6th Kentucky Infantry Regiment (Confederate)
- 6th Kentucky Infantry Regiment (Union)
- 7th Kentucky Infantry Regiment (Confederate)
- 7th Kentucky Infantry Regiment (Union)
- 8th Kentucky Infantry Regiment (Confederate)
- 8th Kentucky Infantry Regiment (Union)
- 9th Kentucky Infantry Regiment (Confederate)
- 9th Kentucky Infantry Regiment (Union)
- 10th Kentucky Infantry Regiment
- 11th Kentucky Infantry Regiment
- 12th Kentucky Infantry Regiment
- 13th Kentucky Infantry Regiment
- 14th Kentucky Infantry Regiment
- 15th Kentucky Cavalry Regiment (Union)
- 15th Kentucky Infantry Regiment
- 15th state to join the United States of America
- 16th Kentucky Infantry Regiment
- 17th Kentucky Infantry Regiment
- 18th Kentucky Infantry Regiment
- 21st Kentucky Infantry Regiment
- 22nd Kentucky Infantry Regiment
- 23rd Kentucky Infantry Regiment
- 24th Kentucky Infantry Regiment
- 25th Kentucky Infantry Regiment
- 26th Kentucky Infantry Regiment
- 27th Kentucky Infantry Regiment
- 28th Kentucky Infantry Regiment
- 30th Kentucky Mounted Infantry Regiment
- 32nd Kentucky Infantry Regiment
- 33rd Kentucky Infantry Regiment
- 34th Kentucky Infantry Regiment
- 35th Kentucky Infantry Regiment
- 37th Kentucky Mounted Infantry Regiment
- 37th parallel north
- 38th parallel north
- 39th Kentucky Infantry Regiment
- 39th parallel north
- 40th Kentucky Infantry Regiment
- 41st Kentucky Infantry Regiment
- 42nd Kentucky Infantry Regiment
- 45th Kentucky Mounted Infantry Regiment
- 47th Kentucky Mounted Infantry Regiment
- 48th Kentucky Mounted Infantry Regiment
- 49th Kentucky Mounted Infantry Regiment
- 52nd Kentucky Mounted Infantry Regiment
- 53rd Kentucky Mounted Infantry Regiment
- 54th Kentucky Mounted Infantry Regiment
- 55th Kentucky Mounted Infantry Regiment
- 82nd meridian west
- 83rd meridian west
- 84th meridian west
- 85th meridian west
- 86th meridian west
- 87th meridian west
- 88th meridian west
- 89th meridian west

== A ==
- Adjacent states:
  - Commonwealth of Virginia
  - State of Illinois
  - State of Indiana
  - State of Missouri
  - State of Ohio
  - State of Tennessee
  - State of West Virginia
- Agriculture in Kentucky
- Airports in Kentucky
- Amusement parks in Kentucky
- Appalachia
- Aquaria in Kentucky
  - commons:Category:Aquaria in Kentucky
- Arboreta in Kentucky
  - commons:Category:Arboreta in Kentucky
- Archaeology of Kentucky
  - Category:Archaeological sites in Kentucky
    - commons:Category:Archaeological sites in Kentucky
- Architecture of Kentucky
- Art museums and galleries in Kentucky
  - commons:Category:Art museums and galleries in Kentucky
- Astronomical observatories in Kentucky
  - commons:Category:Astronomical observatories in Kentucky
- Attorney General of the Commonwealth of Kentucky

== B ==
- Battery "A" Kentucky Light Artillery
- Battery "B" Kentucky Light Artillery
- Battery "C" Kentucky Light Artillery
- Battery "E" Kentucky Light Artillery
- Battle of Augusta (1862)
- Battle of Barbourville
- Battle of Camp Wildcat
- Battle of the Cumberland Gap (1862)
- Battle of the Cumberland Gap (1863)
- Battle of Cynthiana
- Battle of Lebanon (Kentucky)
- Battle of Lucas Bend
- Battle of Middle Creek
- Battle of Mill Springs
- Battle of Mount Sterling
- Battle of Munfordville
- Battle of Paducah
- Battle of Perryville
- Battle of Richmond
- Battle of Rowlett's Station
- Battle of Sacramento (Kentucky)
- Battle of Salyersville
- Battle of Somerset
- Battle of Tebbs Bend
- Bluegrass region
- Bluegrass & Backroads – Television program about places and things in the Bluegrass State
- Botanical gardens in Kentucky
  - commons:Category:Botanical gardens in Kentucky
- Buildings and structures in Kentucky
  - commons:Category:Buildings and structures in Kentucky
- Byrne's Artillery Battery

== C ==
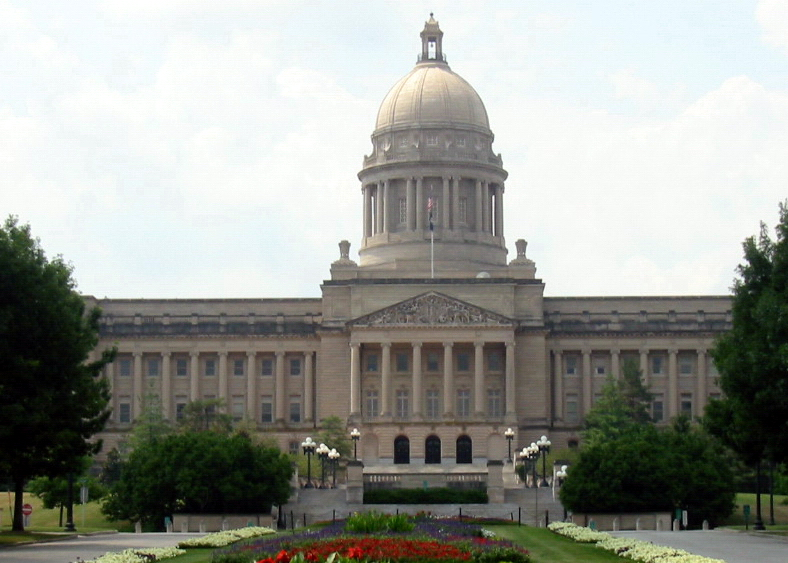
The Commonwealth of Kentucky State Capitol in Frankfort

- Canyons and gorges of Kentucky
  - commons:Category:Canyons and gorges of Kentucky
- Capital of the Commonwealth of Kentucky
- Capitol of the Commonwealth of Kentucky
  - commons:Category:Kentucky State Capitol
- Caudill's Army
- Caves of Kentucky
  - commons:Category:Caves of Kentucky
- Census statistical areas of Kentucky
- Churchill Downs
- Cities in Kentucky
  - commons:Category:Cities in Kentucky
- Climate of Kentucky
- Climate change in Kentucky
- Coal mining in Kentucky
- Cobb's Battery
- Colleges and universities in Kentucky
  - commons:Category:Universities and colleges in Kentucky
- Colony of Virginia, 1607–1776
- Commonwealth of Kentucky website
  - Constitution of the Commonwealth of Kentucky
  - Government of the Commonwealth of Kentucky
    - Category:Government of Kentucky
      - commons:Category:Government of Kentucky
  - Executive branch of the government of the Commonwealth of Kentucky
    - Governor of the Commonwealth of Kentucky
  - Legislative branch of the government of the Commonwealth of Kentucky
    - Legislature of the Commonwealth of Kentucky
      - Senate of the Commonwealth of Kentucky
      - House of Representatives of the Commonwealth of Kentucky
  - Judicial branch of the government of the Commonwealth of Kentucky
    - Supreme Court of the Commonwealth of Kentucky
- Commonwealth of Virginia, (1776–1792)
- Communications in Kentucky
  - commons:Category:Communications in Kentucky
- Companies in Kentucky
- Congressional districts of Kentucky
- Constitution of the Commonwealth of Kentucky

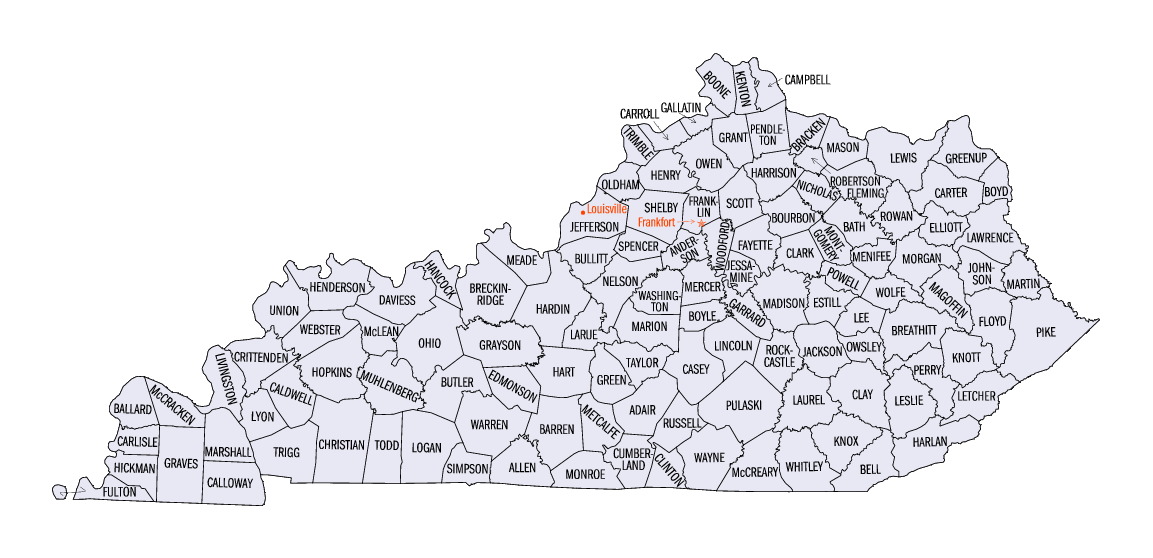
An enlargeable map of the 120 counties of the Commonwealth of Kentucky

- Convention centers in Kentucky
  - commons:Category:Convention centers in Kentucky
- Counties of the Commonwealth of Kentucky
  - commons:Category:Counties in Kentucky
- Cuisine of Kentucky
  - Category:Cuisine of Kentucky
    - commons:Category:Kentucky cuisine
- Culture of Kentucky
  - Category:Culture of Kentucky
    - commons:Category:Kentucky culture

== D ==
- Demographics of Kentucky

== E ==
- Economy of Kentucky
  - Category:Economy of Kentucky
    - commons:Category:Economy of Kentucky
- Education in Kentucky
  - Category:Education in Kentucky
    - commons:Category:Education in Kentucky
- Elections in Kentucky
  - commons:Category:Elections in Kentucky
- Environment of Kentucky
  - commons:Category:Environment of Kentucky

== F ==
The Flag of the Commonwealth of Kentucky

- Fayette County, Virginia, 1780–1792
- Festivals in Kentucky
  - commons:Category:Festivals in Kentucky
- Flag of the Commonwealth of Kentucky
- Forts in Kentucky
  - Category:Forts in Kentucky
    - commons:Category:Forts in Kentucky
- Frankfort, Kentucky, state capital since 1792

== G ==
The Great Seal of the Commonwealth of Kentucky

- Geography of Kentucky
  - Category:Geography of Kentucky
    - commons:Category:Geography of Kentucky
- Geology of Kentucky
  - commons:Category:Geology of Kentucky
- Ghost towns in Kentucky
  - Category:Ghost towns in Kentucky
    - commons:Category:Ghost towns in Kentucky
- Golf clubs and courses in Kentucky
- Government of the Commonwealth of Kentucky website
  - Category:Government of Kentucky
    - commons:Category:Government of Kentucky
- Governor of the Commonwealth of Kentucky
  - List of governors of Kentucky
- Graves' Battery
- Great Seal of the Commonwealth of Kentucky
- Greenhouse gas emissions in Kentucky

== H ==
- Hemp in Kentucky
- Heritage railroads in Kentucky
  - commons:Category:Heritage railroads in Kentucky
- High schools of Kentucky
- Higher education in Kentucky
- Highway routes in Kentucky
- Hiking trails in Kentucky
  - commons:Category:Hiking trails in Kentucky
- History of Kentucky
  - Timeline of Kentucky history
  - Historical outline of Kentucky
  - History of Baptists in Kentucky
    - Category:History of Kentucky
      - commons:Category:History of Kentucky
- Hospitals in Kentucky
- House of Representatives of the Commonwealth of Kentucky

== I ==
- Images of Kentucky
  - commons:Category:Kentucky
- Interstate highway routes in Kentucky
- Islands in Kentucky

== J ==
- Jefferson County, Virginia, 1780–1792
- Jural rights

== K ==
- Kentucky website
  - Category:Kentucky
    - commons:Category:Kentucky
      - commons:Category:Maps of Kentucky
- Kentucky County, Virginia, 1776–1780
- Kentucky Derby
- Kentucky–Indiana League
- Kentucky State Capitol
- KY – United States Postal Service postal code for the Commonwealth of Kentucky

== L ==
- Lakes in Kentucky
  - Category:Lakes of Kentucky
    - commons:Category:Lakes of Kentucky
- Landmarks in Kentucky
  - commons:Category:Landmarks in Kentucky
- Lexington, Kentucky
- Lexington, Kentucky, in the American Civil War
- Lieutenant Governor of the Commonwealth of Kentucky
- Lincoln County, Virginia, 1780–1792
- Lists related to the Commonwealth of Kentucky:
  - List of airports in Kentucky
  - List of census statistical areas in Kentucky
  - List of cities in Kentucky
  - List of colleges and universities in Kentucky
  - List of United States congressional districts in Kentucky
  - List of counties in Kentucky
  - List of dams and reservoirs in Kentucky
  - List of forts in Kentucky
  - List of ghost towns in Kentucky
  - List of governors of Kentucky
  - List of high schools in Kentucky
  - List of highway routes in Kentucky
  - List of historic houses in Kentucky
  - List of hospitals in Kentucky
  - List of individuals executed in Kentucky
  - List of Interstate highway routes in Kentucky
  - List of islands in Kentucky
  - List of lakes in Kentucky
  - List of law enforcement agencies in Kentucky
  - List of lieutenant governors of Kentucky
  - List of museums in Kentucky
  - List of National Historic Landmarks in Kentucky
  - List of naval ships named for Kentucky
  - List of newspapers in Kentucky
  - List of parkways and named roads in Kentucky
  - List of people from Kentucky
  - List of power stations in Kentucky
  - List of radio stations in Kentucky
  - List of railroads in Kentucky
  - List of Registered Historic Places in Kentucky
  - List of rivers of Kentucky
  - List of school districts in Kentucky
  - List of state forests in Kentucky
  - List of state highway routes in Kentucky
  - List of state parks in Kentucky
  - List of state prisons in Kentucky
  - List of symbols of the Commonwealth of Kentucky
  - List of television stations in Kentucky
  - List of Kentucky's congressional delegations
  - List of United States congressional districts in Kentucky
  - List of United States representatives from Kentucky
  - List of United States senators from Kentucky
  - List of U.S. highway routes in Kentucky
- Louisville Home Guard
- Louisville, Kentucky
- Louisville, Kentucky, in the American Civil War

== M ==
- Maps of Kentucky
  - commons:Category:Maps of Kentucky
- Mass media in Kentucky
- Mississippi River
- Monuments and memorials in Kentucky
  - commons:Category:Monuments and memorials in Kentucky
- Mountains of Kentucky
  - commons:Category:Mountains of Kentucky
- Munday's 1st Battalion Kentucky Cavalry
- Museums in Kentucky
  - Category:Museums in Kentucky
    - commons:Category:Museums in Kentucky
- Music of Kentucky
  - commons:Category:Music of Kentucky
  - Category:Musical groups from Kentucky
  - Category:Musicians from Kentucky

== N ==
- Named roads and parkways in Kentucky
- National Forests of Kentucky
  - commons:Category:National Forests of Kentucky
- Natural arches of Kentucky
  - commons:Category:Natural arches of Kentucky
- Natural history of Kentucky
  - commons:Category:Natural history of Kentucky
- Nature centers in Kentucky
  - commons:Category:Nature centers in Kentucky
- Naval ships named for Kentucky
- Newspapers of Kentucky

== O ==
- Ohio River
- Orphan Brigade

== P ==
- Parkways and named roads in Kentucky
- Patterson's Independent Company Kentucky Volunteer Engineers
- People from Kentucky
  - Category:People from Kentucky
    - commons:Category:People from Kentucky
    - Category:People from Kentucky by populated place
    - Category:People from Kentucky by county
    - Category:People from Kentucky by occupation
- Politics of Kentucky
  - commons:Category:Politics of Kentucky
- Protected areas of Kentucky
  - commons:Category:Protected areas of Kentucky

== R ==
- Radio stations in Kentucky
- Railroad museums in Kentucky
  - commons:Category:Railroad museums in Kentucky
- Railroads in Kentucky
- Registered historic places in Kentucky
  - commons:Category:Registered Historic Places in Kentucky
- Religion in Kentucky
  - Category:Religion in Kentucky
    - commons:Category:Religion in Kentucky
- Rivers of Kentucky
  - commons:Category:Rivers of Kentucky
- Roller coasters in Kentucky
  - commons:Category:Roller coasters in Kentucky

== S ==
- School districts of Kentucky
- Scouting in Kentucky
- Senate of the Commonwealth of Kentucky
- Settlements in Kentucky
  - Cities in Kentucky
  - Census Designated Places in Kentucky
  - Other unincorporated communities in Kentucky
  - List of ghost towns in Kentucky
- Simmonds' Battery Kentucky Light Artillery
- Solar power in Kentucky
- Sports in Kentucky
  - Category:Sports in Kentucky
    - commons:Category:Sports in Kentucky
  - Category:Sports venues in Kentucky
    - commons:Category:Sports venues in Kentucky
- State Capitol of Kentucky
- State highway routes in Kentucky
- State of Kentucky – see: Commonwealth of Kentucky
- State parks of Kentucky
  - commons:Category:State parks of Kentucky
- State prisons of Kentucky
- Structures in Kentucky
  - commons:Category:Buildings and structures in Kentucky
- Supreme Court of the Commonwealth of Kentucky
- Symbols of the Commonwealth of Kentucky
  - Category:Symbols of Kentucky
    - commons:Category:Symbols of Kentucky

== T ==
- Telephone area codes in Kentucky
- Telecommunications in Kentucky
  - commons:Category:Communications in Kentucky
- Television shows set in Kentucky
- Television stations in Kentucky
- Tennessee River
- Tennessee Valley Authority
- Theatres in Kentucky
  - commons:Category:Theatres in Kentucky
- Tourism in Kentucky website
  - commons:Category:Tourism in Kentucky
- Transportation in Kentucky
  - Category:Transportation in Kentucky
    - commons:Category:Transport in Kentucky
- Triple Crown of Thoroughbred Racing

== U ==
- United States of America
  - States of the United States of America
  - United States census statistical areas of Kentucky
  - Kentucky's congressional delegations
  - United States congressional districts in Kentucky
  - United States Court of Appeals for the Sixth Circuit
  - United States District Court for the Eastern District of Kentucky
  - United States District Court for the Western District of Kentucky
  - United States representatives from Kentucky
  - United States senators from Kentucky
- Universities and colleges in Kentucky
  - commons:Category:Universities and colleges in Kentucky
- U.S. highway routes in Kentucky
- US-KY – ISO 3166-2:US region code for the Commonwealth of Kentucky

== W ==
- Waterfalls of Kentucky
  - commons:Category:Waterfalls of Kentucky
  Wikimedia
  - Wikimedia Commons:Category:Kentucky
    - commons:Category:Maps of Kentucky
  - Wikinews:Category:Kentucky
    - Wikinews:Portal:Kentucky
  - Wikipedia Category:Kentucky
    - Wikipedia Portal:Kentucky
    - Wikipedia:WikiProject Kentucky
      - Category:WikiProject Kentucky articles
      - Category:WikiProject Kentucky members
- Wind power in Kentucky
- Kentucky wine

== Z ==
- Zoos in Kentucky
  - commons:Category:Zoos in Kentucky

== See also ==
- Topic overview:
  - Kentucky
  - Outline of Kentucky
