= Stoneman's 1864 raid =

Union cavalry raid during the US Civil War

- Part of the American Civil War
- Stoneman's 1864 Raid brought Union troops from Tennessee and Kentucky into southwestern Virginia
Date	December 12, 1864 – December 22, 1864
Location	Southwest Virginia
Result	Union victory

Belligerents
(United States) USA	(Confederate States of America) CSA

Commanders and leaders
George Stoneman	John C. Breckinridge

Strength
5,700	2,800

Stoneman's 1864 raid, also known as Stoneman's raid into Southwest Virginia, was an American Civil War expedition by Union troops into southwestern Virginia. The expedition occurred from December 10 through December 29, 1864. Union Major General George Stoneman led cavalry and mounted infantry from Tennessee and Kentucky into territory under the command of Confederate Major General John C. Breckinridge. The purpose of the raid was to damage infrastructure used for the Confederate war effort. Targets included salt mines in Saltville, Virginia; lead mines in southern Wythe County; and the railroad used to transport those resources. The salt was used by for food preservation and the lead was used to make bullets. The Virginia and Tennessee Railroad was used to transport both resources for the Confederacy, and it was also used to transport Confederate troops.

The expedition began at Bean Station, Tennessee, on December 12, the forces from Tennessee and Kentucky combined. Skirmishing occurred near Bristol, Tennessee. In Virginia, skirmishing happened near Glade Spring and near Abington on December 15 as the Union troops moved toward the salt mines. Avoiding the heavily–guarded salt mines, Stoneman's troops had a small fight (classified as an action) at Marion on December 16, and also captured the Confederate regional headquarters at Wytheville. On December 17 the lead mines in southern Wythe County were captured and severely damaged. On December 17 and 18, Stoneman had the largest fight of the expedition near Marion. After Breckinridge and his forces retreated from Marion on December 19, Stoneman was able to capture Saltville and damage its salt mines. This occurred on December 20 and 21.

While Stoneman was involved in the various skirmishes and actions, one of his regiments destroyed a significant quantity of railroad infrastructure, including bridges, locomotives, and railcars. After Saltville, the two Union forces split as one unit returned to Kentucky and one unit returned to Tennessee. The return trip was difficult because of cold weather, worn-out horses, and harassment by Confederate militia and cavalry.

== Background ==
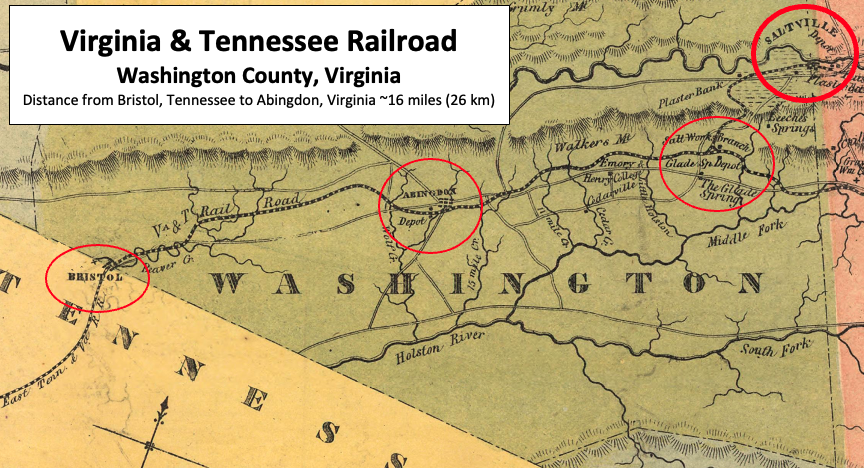

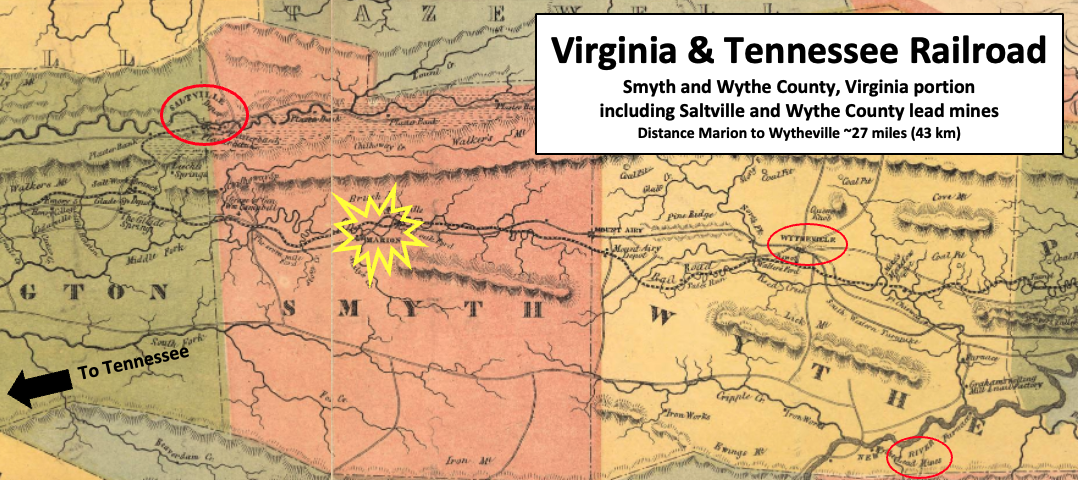

Union Brevet Major General Stephen G. Burbridge was the commander of a division from Kentucky that joined Stoneman and a brigade from Tennessee commanded by Brigadier General Alvan C. Gillem. They traveled from Bean Station, Tennessee, to Bristol and Virginia. The raid in Virginia occurred mostly in Washington, Smyth, and Wythe counties.

== Conflicts ==
- Dec. 12 - Action at Big Creek near Rogersville - The Union regiments involved were the 8th, 9th, and 13th Tennessee Cavalries.
- Dec. 13 - Kingsport, TN - action - The Union regiments involved were Battery E Kentucky Light Artillery; 11th Michigan Cavalry; and 8th, 9th and 13th Tennessee Cavalries. The Confederate force was Duke's Cavalry, temporarily under the command of Richard Morgan. Duke's Cavalry was defeated and had over 100 casualties. Morgan was captured, as was his wagon train. Union loss was two killed and seven wounded.
- Dec. 13 - Kingston, TN - skirmish - The Union regiment involved was the 30th Kentucky Mounted Infantry.
- Dec. 14 - Bristol, TN - affair - The Union regiments involved were the 11th and 12th Kentucky Cavalries; the 10th and 11th Michigan Cavalries; and the 12th Ohio Cavalry.
- Dec. 15 - Glade Springs, Virginia - skirmish - The Union regiment involved was the 12th Kentucky Cavalry.
- Dec. 15 - Abington, Virginia - skirmish - The Union regiments involved were the 11th Michigan Cavalry and the 8th, 9th and 13th Tennessee Cavalries.
- Dec. 16 - Action at Marion, Virginia - The Union regiments involved were the 11th Kentucky Cavalry, the 11th Michigan Cavalry, and the 8th, 9th, and 13th Tennessee Cavalries. Union loss was 58 wounded (Marion and Wytheville).
- Dec. 16 - Capture of Wytheville, Virginia - The Union regiments involved were the 11th Kentucky Cavalry, the 11th Michigan Cavalry, and the 8th, 9th, and 13th Tennessee Cavalries. Union loss was 58 wounded (Marion and Wytheville).
- Dec. 17 - Capture and destruction of Lead Mines in southern Wythe County, Virginia - 5th and 6th U.S. Colored Cavalry
- Dec. 17-18 - Battle of Marion near Marion, Virginia - engagement - Union regiments involved were the 11th and 12th Kentucky Cavalries; Battery E Kentucky Light Artillery; 30th, 45th, 53rd, and 54th Kentucky Mounted Infantries; 10th and 11th Michigan Cavalries; 12th Ohio Cavalry; 8th, 9th, and 13th Tennessee Cavalries; and the 5th and 6th U.S. Colored Cavalry. Union casualties were 13 killed and 58 wounded. Confederates were led by Major General John C. Breckinridge. Breckinridge's force totaled to about 1,000 fighters, including: Cosby's Cavalry Brigade, Duke's Cavalry Brigade, Giltner's Cavalry Brigade, Witcher's Battalion, and four artillery pieces. Breckinridge, with a good defensive field position, fought against over 3,000 Union fighters that included several regiments armed with repeating rifles. After few gains by either side, Breckinridge stealthily withdrew after running low on ammunition and being surrounded on three sides.
- Dec. 18 - Abingdon, Virginia - action - The Union regiment involved was the 30th Kentucky Mounted Infantry.
- Dec. 20-21 - Capture of Saltville and destruction of salt mines - Union regiments involved were the 11th and 12th Kentucky Cavalries; Battery E Kentucky Light Artillery; 30th, 45th, 53rd, and 54th Kentucky Mounted Infantries; 10th and 11th Michigan Cavalries; 12th Ohio Cavalry; 8th, 9th, and 13th Tennessee Cavalries; and the 5th and 6th U.S. Colored Cavalry. Confederate Colonel Robert T. Preston commanded 400 to 500 reservists and militia members at Saltville. Preston was defeated and fled to Tazewell, Virginia.

Total Union casualties for Stoneman's Raid into Southwest Virginia were 20 killed and 123 wounded. The raid is listed as beginning on December 10, 1864, at Bean's Station, Tennessee; and lasting until December 29.

== Opposing forces ==
=== Union Forces ===
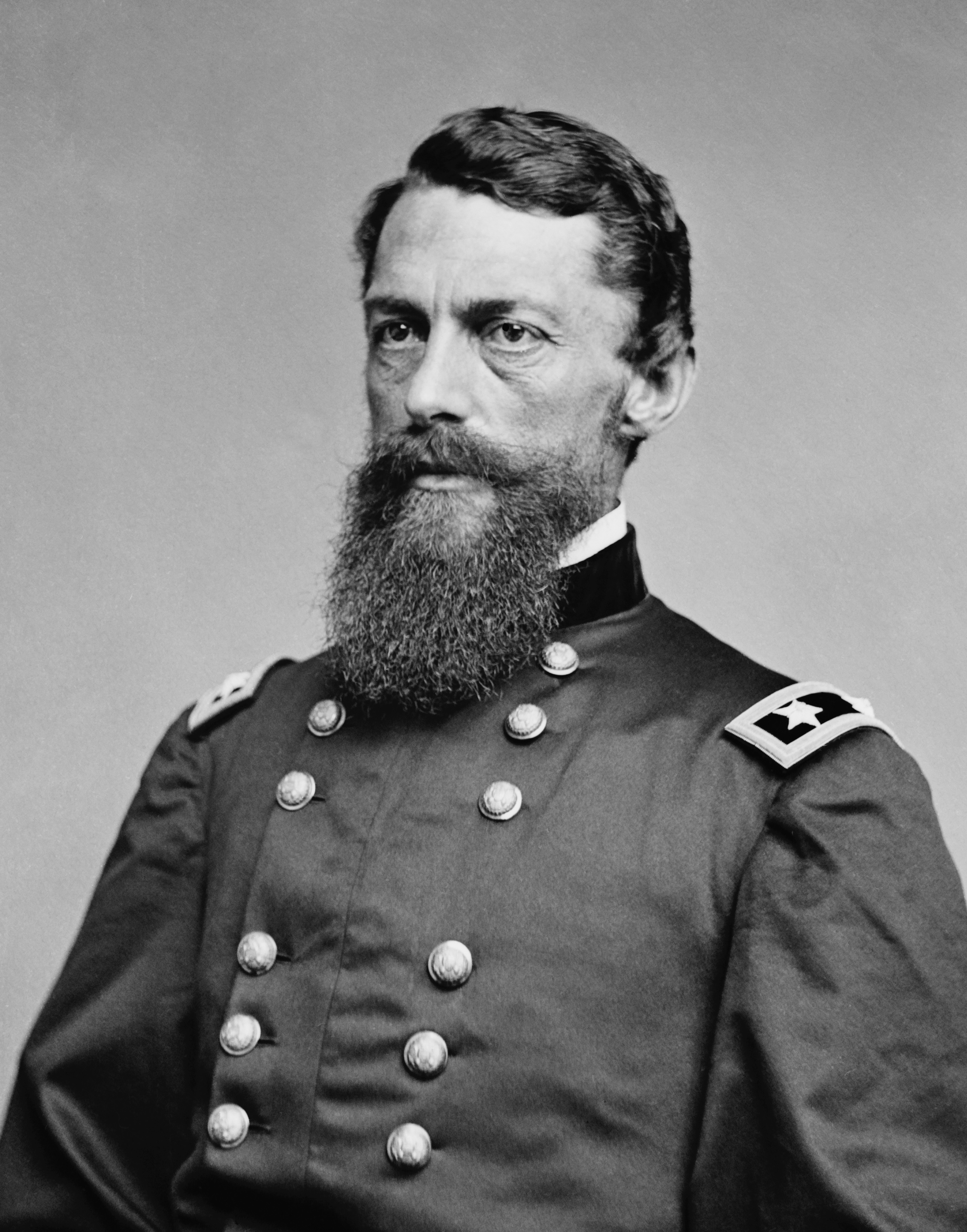
George Stoneman

Major General George Stoneman was second-in-command in the Department of the Ohio, and based in Knoxville, Tennessee in late 1864. For his excursion into southwestern Virginia, his command consisted of two forces: one from Kentucky and one from Tennessee. (Note: The Union regiments listed below are those listed in Frederick H. Dyer's A Compendium of the War of the Rebellion.)

Governor's Guards: This Tennessee brigade was commanded by Brigadier General Alvan C. Gillem, and totaled to 1,500 mounted soldiers that were chosen for the expedition. (Note: Major General George Stoneman called Gillem's force "a portion of a Tennessee cavalry brigade".) The brigade consisted of the 8th Tennessee Cavalry Regiment (Union) commanded by Colonel Samuel N. Patton; the 9th Tennessee Cavalry Regiment (Union) commanded by Major James H. Hornsby; and the 13th Tennessee Cavalry Regiment (Union). Lieutenant Colonel B. P. Stacy commanded the 13th Tennessee, and Major Joseph H. Wagner commanded one of the regiment's battalions.

Burbridge's Division: Brevet Major General Stephen G. Burbridge was the commander of this division. (Note: Burbridge calls his command "my mounted force" in his December 28 report, and mentions multiple brigades that are part of the force. In Brigadier General Gillem's December 30 report, he mentions "General Burbridge's division" on two pages.) This mounted force was organized into brigades and consisted of 4,200 soldiers according to Stoneman's report, while Burbridge reported that its size was 4,000.

- Burbridge's First Brigade was commanded by Colonel Simeon B. Brown of the 11th Michigan Cavalry. It consisted of the 12th Ohio Cavalry, commanded by Lieutenant Colonel Robert H. Bentley; the 11th Michigan Cavalry commanded by Lieutenant Colonel Robert H. Bentley; the 11th Kentucky Cavalry commanded by Lieutenant Colonel William O. Boyle; and the 12th Kentucky Cavalry commanded by Major James B. Harrison. The 12th Ohio and 11th Michigan were considered veteran regiments, and both were using Spencer carbines. Three of the regiments (the 12th Kentucky did not) had experience fighting in the First Battle of Saltville that occurred on October 2, 1864. At least one company from the 12th Kentucky was armed with Henry repeating rifles. The 12th Kentucky was detached for a mission of damaging railroad infrastructure, and passed through Marion a day or two before the battle.
- Burbridge's Second Brigade was commanded by Colonel Harvey M. Buckley of the 54th Kentucky Mounted Infantry (Union). Regiments in this brigade included the 30th Kentucky Mounted Infantry Regiment (Union), the 53rd Kentucky Mounted Infantry Regiment (Union), and the 54th Kentucky Mounted Infantry. The 30th Kentucky had experience fighting at Saltville on October 2.
- Burbridge's Third Brigade was commanded by Colonel James F. Wade of the 6th United States Colored Cavalry. The brigade consisted of the 45th Kentucky Mounted Infantry Regiment (Union), the 5th United States Colored Cavalry Regiment, and the 6th United States Colored Cavalry Regiment. All three regiments had experience fighting at Saltville on October 2, but the two Colored Cavalry regiments had been organized only a few months earlier. The 5th U.S. Colored Cavalry had 112 casualties in the October 2 battle, and some of those soldiers were murdered in their hospital beds in what became known as the Saltville Massacre. Although not listed in Dyer's Compendium as present at the battle, other sources (including the regiment history in Dyer's Compendium) have indicated that the 39th Kentucky Mounted Infantry Regiment was present.

Other units: Battery "E" Kentucky Light Artillery (Union) and the 10th Michigan Cavalry Regiment were also part of the Union force. The 10th Michigan was a detachment of 50 soldiers, led by Captain James B. Roberts, that was Major General Stoneman's escort. (Note: Some sources mention Ohio Heavy Artillery as involved in the expedition. Starr says that Gillem's brigade had "two regiments of Ohio heavy artillery, serving as infantry". Stoneman's report mentions "two regiments of Ohio heavy artillery" meeting at Bean's Station. A history of the 12th Ohio Cavalry also mentions the meet at Bean's Station, describing the "First and Second Regiments of Ohio Heavy Artillery under General Ammen...to assist in the campaign." Dyer does not list either regiment for the Battle of Marion. The National Park Service says the 1st was foraging on "Expeditions on the French Broad and Chucky River in East Tennessee and North Carolina" during December 1864. It also says the 2nd was on "Ammon's Expedition to Bean's Station December 7–29".)

=== Confederate forces ===
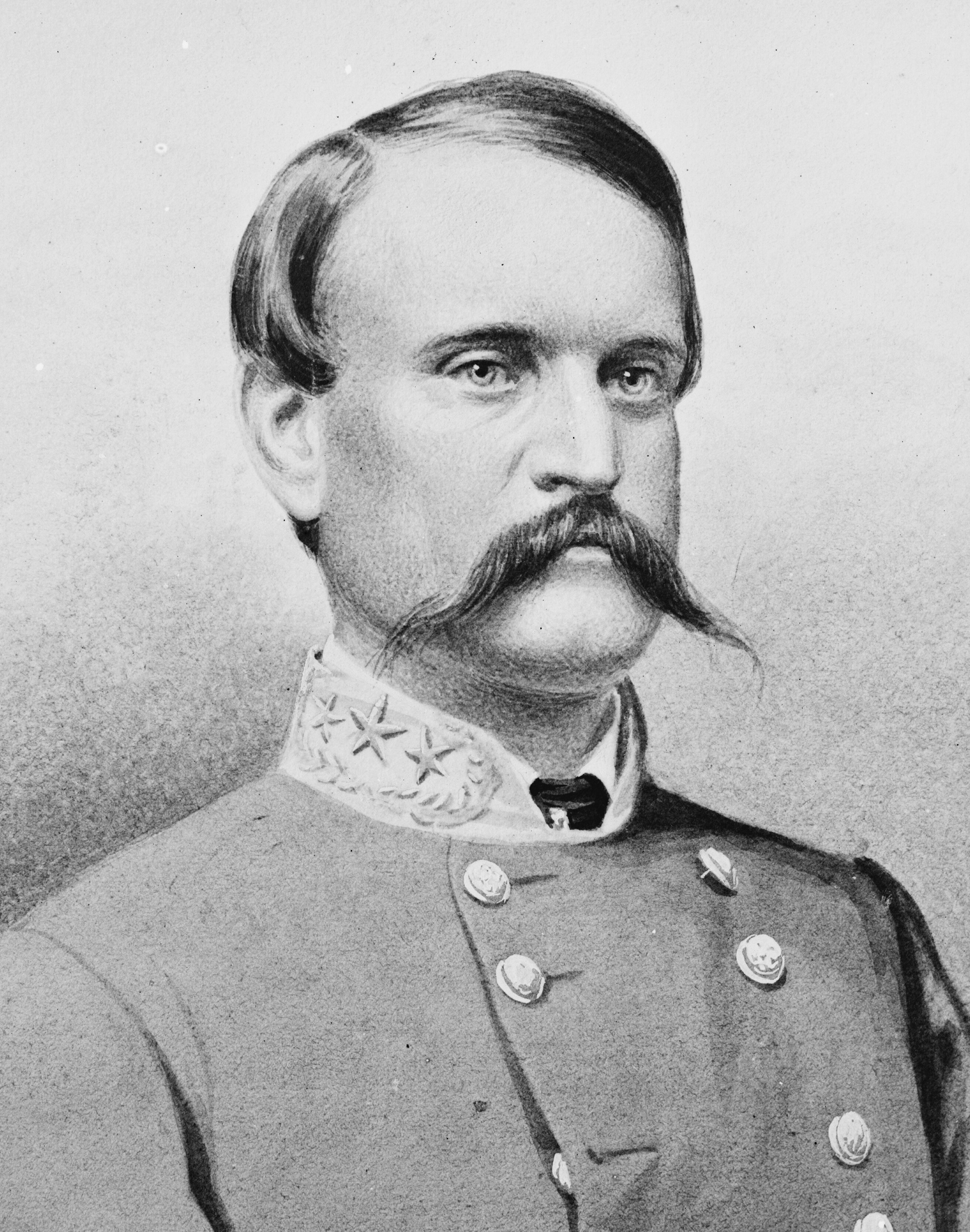
John C. Breckinridge

The Confederate forces were under command of Major General John C. Breckinridge, who was the commander of the Department of Western Virginia and East Tennessee. Upon receiving intelligence that a Union force was moving from Tennessee to Virginia, Breckinridge began assembling forces. He arrived in Saltville by train with Brigadier General John Echols on December 15. Breckinridge's force totaled to about 1600 soldiers excluding Vaughn's brigade. For the Battle of Marion, the militia portion of the force remained in Saltville, giving Breckinridge a force of about 1,000. (Note: For November 10, 1864, Duke's Brigade had 440 effectives present. Witcher's command had 584 effectives, and a combination of Cosby's and Giltner's commands had 250 effectives. Duke's Brigade was defeated on December 13, 1864, and lost 84 soldiers taken prisoner along with its wagon train.)

- Cosby - This cavalry brigade was commanded by Brigadier General George B. Cosby. Among the units in this brigade were several units of the Kentucky Mounted Rifles.
- Duke - This cavalry brigade was commanded by Brigadier General Basil W. Duke. It was the remnants of the famed Morgan's Cavalry that was commanded by John Hunt Morgan until his death on September 4, 1864.
- Giltner - Colonel Henry L. Giltner, of the 4th Kentucky Cavalry Regiment (Confederate) commanded this brigade. It consisted of the 4th Kentucky Cavalry (Confederate), the 10th Kentucky Cavalry (Confederate), the 10th Kentucky Mounted Rifles (Confederate), and the 64th Virginia Mounted Infantry Regiment.
- Vaughn - Brigadier General John C. Vaughn commanded a cavalry brigade that was in the area and providing intelligence to Breckinridge. Included in Vaughn's brigade was the 43rd Tennessee Mounted Infantry Regiment commanded by Colonel James W. Gillespie.
- Witcher - Lieutenant Colonel Vincent A. Witcher, of the 34th Virginia Cavalry Battalion, commanded the battalion.
- Artillery - Breckinridge had artillery at Saltville and Marion. His report mentions "Barr's artillery company, a few men of Kain's artillery, and some pieces in position" at Saltville. He also said he had Burroughs' battery at Marion, which had four artillery pieces.
- Militia - Colonel Robert T. Preston commanded 400 to 500 militia members. They were stationed at Saltville, and did not engage elsewhere.

== Notes ==
=== References ===
- Breckinridge, John C. (1902). "Report of Maj. Gen. John C. Breckinridge, C.S. Army....". In Ainsworth, Fred C.; Kirkley, Joseph W. (eds.). The War of the Rebellion: a Compilation of the Official Records of the Union and Confederate Armies Additions and Corrections to Series I Volume XLV. Washington, DC: Government Printing Office. pp. 824–827. OCLC 318422190.
- Burbridge, Stephen G. (1902). "Reports of Bvt. Maj. Gen. Stephen G. Burbridge, U.S. Army". In Ainsworth, Fred C.; Kirkley, Joseph W. (eds.). The War of the Rebellion: a Compilation of the Official Records of the Union and Confederate Armies Additions and Corrections to Series I Volume XLV. Washington, DC: Government Printing Office. pp. 815–818. OCLC 318422190.
- Cosby, George B. (1902). "Reports of Brig. Gen. George B. Cosby, C.S. Army". In Ainsworth, Fred C.; Kirkley, Joseph W. (eds.). The War of the Rebellion: a Compilation of the Official Records of the Union and Confederate Armies Additions and Corrections to Series I Volume XLV. Washington, DC: Government Printing Office. p. 841. OCLC 318422190.
- Davis, William C. (2010). Breckinridge: Statesman, Soldier, Symbol. Lexington, Kentucky: University Press of Kentucky. ISBN 978-0-81315-997-3. OCLC 900543965.
- Dyer, Frederick H. (1908). A Compendium of the War of the Rebellion. Des Moines, Iowa: Dyer Pub. Co. OCLC 1028851810.
- Elliott, Tho. I. (1892). "Instructions letter forwarded by Tho. I. Elliott, Lieutenant and Acting Assistant Adjutant-General". In Davis, George B.; Perry, Leslie J.; Kirkley, Joseph W. (eds.). The War of the Rebellion: a Compilation of the Official Records of the Union and Confederate Armies Series I Volume XXXIX - Part I - Reports. Washington, DC: Government Printing Office. pp. 70–71.
- Fordney, Ben Fuller (2008). George Stoneman: A Biography of the Union General. Jefferson, North Carolina: McFarland & Company, Inc. ISBN 978-0-78648-346-4. OCLC 1476941238.
- Gillem, Alvan C. (1902). "Report of Brig. Gen. Alvan C. Gillem, U.S. Army". In Ainsworth, Fred C.; Kirkley, Joseph W. (eds.). The War of the Rebellion: a Compilation of the Official Records of the Union and Confederate Armies Additions and Corrections to Series I Volume XLV. Washington, DC: Government Printing Office. pp. 819–824. OCLC 318422190.
- Giltner, Henry L. (1902). "Report of Col. Henry L. Giltner, Fourth Kentucky Cavalry". In Ainsworth, Fred C.; Kirkley, Joseph W. (eds.). The War of the Rebellion: a Compilation of the Official Records of the Union and Confederate Armies Additions and Corrections to Series I Volume XLV. Washington, DC: Government Printing Office. pp. 840–841. OCLC 318422190.
- Hatchitt, James G. (1892). "Report of Surg. James G. Hatchitt, U.S. Army....". In Ainsworth, Fred C.; Kirkley, Joseph W. (eds.). The War of the Rebellion: a Compilation of the Official Records of the Union and Confederate Armies Series I Volume XXXIX Part I – Reports. Washington, DC: Government Printing Office. pp. 553–554. OCLC 318422190.
- Johnston II, Angus J. (August 1957). "Virginia Railroads in April 1861". Journal of Southern History. 23 (3). Rice University: 307–330. doi:10.2307/2954883. JSTOR 2954883. Archived from the original on July 12, 2024.
- Kentucky; Lindsey, Daniel Weisiger (1867). Report of the Adjutant General of the State of Kentucky: Printed by authority of the Legislature of Kentucky ... 1861-1866 Vol. II. Frankfort, Kentucky: Kentucky Yeoman Office. OCLC 3260395.
- McKnight, Brian D. (2006). Contested Borderland: The Civil War in Appalachian Kentucky and Virginia. Lexington, Kentucky: University Press of Kentucky. ISBN 978-0-81317-127-2. OCLC 70262485.
- Starr, Stephen Z. (1985). The Union Cavalry in the Civil War - Vol. III - The War in the West, 1861–1865. Baton Rouge, Louisiana: Louisiana State University Press. ISBN 978-0-80710-859-8. OCLC 4492585.
- Stephens, Ann S. (1867). Pictorial History of the War for the Union : A Complete and Reliable History of the War from its Commencement to its Close ... Together with a Complete Chronological Analysis of the War. New York City: B.W. Hitchcock. OCLC 5967902.
- Stoneman, George (1902). "Reports of Maj. Gen. George Stoneman, U.S. Army, commanding". In Ainsworth, Fred C.; Kirkley, Joseph W. (eds.). The War of the Rebellion: a Compilation of the Official Records of the Union and Confederate Armies Additions and Corrections to Series I Volume XLV. Washington, DC: Government Printing Office. pp. 807–815. OCLC 318422190.
- Unknown (1892). "Abstract from return of the forces in the Department of Western Virginia and East Tennessee, Maj. Gen. John C. Breckinridge commanding, for November 10, 1864; headquarters Wytheville Va.". In Davis, George B.; Perry, Leslie J.; Kirkley, Joseph W. (eds.). The War of the Rebellion: a Compilation of the Official Records of the Union and Confederate Armies Part III Correspondence Series I Volume XXXIX. Washington, DC: Government Printing Office. p. 907. OCLC 318422190.
- Vaughn, John C. (1902). "Reports of Brig. Gen. John C. Vaughn, C.S. Army". In Ainsworth, Fred C.; Kirkley, Joseph W. (eds.). The War of the Rebellion: a Compilation of the Official Records of the Union and Confederate Armies Additions and Corrections to Series I Volume XLV. Washington, DC: Government Printing Office. pp. 834–836. OCLC 318422190.
- Whisonant, Robert C. (2015). Arming the Confederacy: How Virginia's Minerals Forged the Rebel War Machine. Cham, Switzerland: Springer International Publishing. ISBN 978-3-319-14508-2. OCLC 903929889.
- Witcher, Vincent A. (1902). "Reports of Lieut. Col. Vincent A. Witcher....". In Ainsworth, Fred C.; Kirkley, Joseph W. (eds.). The War of the Rebellion: a Compilation of the Official Records of the Union and Confederate Armies Additions and Corrections to Series I Volume XLV. Washington, DC: Government Printing Office. pp. 828–829. OCLC 318422190.
