= Battery "C" Kentucky Light Artillery =

- Active: May 1863 to July 26, 1865
- Country: United States
- Allegiance: Union
- Branch: Artillery
- Engagements: Battle of Cynthiana; Battle of Saltville

Battery "C" 1st Kentucky Light Artillery was an artillery battery that served in the Union Army during the American Civil War. It was often referred to as Neville's Battery.

== Service ==
The battery was organizing at Lebanon, Kentucky when it was captured during an attack by General John Hunt Morgan's 1863 raid on July 23, 1863. It reorganized at Louisville, Kentucky on September 10, 1863, and mustered in under the command of Captain John W. Neville.

The battery was attached to District of Louisville, Kentucky, 1st Division, XXIII Corps, Department of the Ohio, to October 1863. District of South Central Kentucky, Department of the Ohio, to January 1864. District of Southwest Kentucky, Department of the Ohio, to April 1864. 3rd Brigade, 1st Division, District of Kentucky, 5th Division, XXIII Corps, Department of the Ohio, to December 1864. Mt. Sterling, District of Kentucky, to February 1865. Little Rock, Arkansas, Department of Arkansas, to July 1865.

Battery "C" 1st Kentucky Light Artillery mustered out of service on July 26, 1865.

== Detailed service ==
Duty in District of Louisville until October 1863, and in southcentral Kentucky until January 1864. Ordered to southwest Kentucky and duty there until March 1864. Reported at Paris, Ky., March 1. At Mt. Sterling, Ky., until May. Ordered to mouth of Beaver on Big Sandy May 3. Operations against Morgan May 31-June 30. Action at Mt. Sterling June 9. Cynthiana June 12. Duty in eastern Kentucky until December. Stoneman's Raid into southwest Virginia December 10–29. Marion December 17–18. Saltville December 20–21. Duty in eastern Kentucky until February 1865. Ordered to Little Rock, Ark., and post duty there until July.

== Casualties ==
The battery lost a total of 20 men during service; 4 enlisted men killed or mortally wounded, 16 enlisted men died of disease.

== Commanders ==
- Captain John W. Neville

== See also ==
- List of Kentucky Civil War Units
- Kentucky in the Civil War
