= 33rd Kentucky Infantry Regiment =

- Active: September 13, 1862, to April 1, 1864
- Country: United States
- Allegiance: Union
- Branch: Infantry
- Engagements: Battle of Munfordville

The 33rd Kentucky Infantry Regiment was an infantry regiment that served in the Union Army during the American Civil War.

== Service ==
The 33rd Kentucky Infantry Regiment was organized at Munfordville, Kentucky and mustered in for a three-year enlistment on September 13, 1862, under the command of Lieutenant Colonel J. F. Lauck.

The regiment was attached to District of Western Kentucky, Department of the Ohio, to April 1863. 2nd Brigade, District of Central Kentucky, Department of the Ohio, to June 1863. Unattached, Munfordville, Kentucky, 1st Division, XXIII Corps, Army of the Ohio, to August 1863. Unattached, 2nd Division, XXIII Corps, to October 1863. District of South Central Kentucky, 1st Division, XXIII Corps, to January 1864. District of Southwest Kentucky, Department of the Ohio, to April 1864.

The 33rd Kentucky Infantry mustered out of service on April 1, 1864, when its members were consolidated with the 26th Kentucky Infantry.

== Detailed service ==
Companies C and G participated in the siege of Munfordville, Kentucky, and Woodsonville, Kentucky, September 13–17, 1862, and was captured. The regiment was on duty at Munfordville, and on the line of the Louisville & Nashville Railroad and Lebanon Branch Railroad until April 1864.

== Casualties ==
The regiment lost a total of 22 enlisted men during service, all due to disease.

== Commanders ==
- Lieutenant Colonel J. F. Lauck

== See also ==
- List of Kentucky Civil War Units
- Kentucky in the Civil War
