= 48th Kentucky Mounted Infantry Regiment =

- Active: October 26, 1863, to December 19, 1864
- Country: United States
- Allegiance: Union
- Branch: Mounted infantry

The 48th Kentucky Mounted Infantry Regiment was a mounted infantry regiment that served in the Union Army during the American Civil War.

== Service ==
The 48th Kentucky Mounted Infantry Regiment was organized at Princeton, Kentucky and mustered in for one year on October 26, 1863, under the command of Colonel Hartwell T. Burge.

The regiment was attached to District of Southwest Kentucky, 1st Division, XXIII Corps, Department of the Ohio, to April 1864. 1st Brigade, 2nd Division, District of Kentucky, 5th Division, XXIII Corps, Department of the Ohio, to December 1864.

Companies A, B, C, D, E, F, G, and H of the 48th Kentucky Mounted Infantry mustered out of service at Lexington, Kentucky, on December 26, 1864; Companies I and K mustered out of service on April 12, 1865.

== Detailed service ==
Duty at Princeton, Ky., until December 1, 1863. Moved to Russellville December 1 and duty there (Companies B, F, G, and H) and at Bowling Green, Ky. (Companies A, D, I, and K), until April 6, 1864. Guard duty on line of Louisville & Nashville Railroad from Cave City to Louisville, Ky. Company A at Elizabethtown; Companies B, F, and H and headquarters at Munfordville; Companies C and K at Fort Boyle, Colesburg; Company D at Cave City; Company E at Shepherdsville; Company I at Louisville, and Company G at Smithland until July 8, 1864. Action at Salem August 8 (detachments from Companies B and C). Regiment relieved and mounted. Moved to Calhoun August 13–19 and join Hobson's operations against Adam Johnson August 19–24. Canton, Ky., August 24. Moved to Cadiz, thence to Princeton, Ky., and operating against guerrillas in counties bordering on the Cumberland River until December 1. Skirmish in Union County August 31 (detachment). Weston September 14. Action with Lyon's forces November 6 (detachment Companies F and K). Eddyville October 17. Providence November 21.

== Casualties ==
The regiment lost a total of 104 men during service; 7 enlisted men killed or mortally wounded, 1 officer and 96 enlisted men died of disease.

== Commanders ==
- Colonel Hartwell T. Burge

== See also ==
- List of Kentucky Civil War Units
- Kentucky in the Civil War
