= Stoneman's raid =

Stoneman's raid may refer to:

- Stoneman's 1863 raid, a cavalry operation in Spotsylvania County that preceded the start of the Battle of Chancellorsville in the American Civil War
- Stoneman's 1864 raid, an expedition into southwest Virginia involving both cavalry and infantry in the American Civil War
- Stoneman's 1865 raid, a cavalry raid that occurred in parts of Tennessee, North Carolina, and Virginia near the end of the American Civil War

== See also ==
- George Stoneman
