= 14th Kentucky Infantry Regiment =

- Active: December 10, 1861, to September 15, 1865
- Country: United States
- Allegiance: Union
- Branch: Infantry
- Engagements: Battle of Salyersville; Atlanta campaign Battle of Kolb's Farm; Battle of Kennesaw Mountain; Siege of Atlanta; Battle of Atlanta; Battle of Jonesboro

The 14th Kentucky Infantry Regiment was an infantry regiment that served in the Union Army during the American Civil War.

== Service ==
The 14th Kentucky Infantry Regiment was organized at Camp Wallace near Louisa, Kentucky, and mustered in for a three-year enlistment on December 10, 1861, under the command of Colonel Laban Theodore Moore.

The regiment was attached to 18th Brigade, Army of the Ohio, to March 1862. 27th Brigade, 7th Division, Army of the Ohio, to October 1862. 2nd Brigade, 3rd Division, Army of Kentucky, Department of the Ohio, to February 1863. District of Eastern Kentucky, Department of the Ohio, to June 1863. 1st Brigade, 4th Division, XXIII Corps, Department of the Ohio, to September 1863. Louisa, Kentucky, District of Eastern Kentucky, 1st Division, XXIII Corps, to April 1864. 1st Brigade, 1st Division, District of Kentucky, 5th Division, XXIII Corps, Department of the Ohio, to May 1864. 3rd Brigade, 2nd Division, XXIII Corps, to August 1864. 1st Brigade, 2nd Division, XXIII Corps, to December 1864. Military District of Kentucky and Department of Kentucky to September 1865.

The 14th Kentucky Infantry mustered out of service at Louisa, Kentucky, on September 15, 1865.

== Detailed service ==
Engaged in operations on borders of Virginia and participated in action at Ivey's Mountain November 8, 1861, before muster. Garfield's Campaign against Humphrey Marshall December 23, 1861, to January 30, 1862. Advance on Paintsville, Ky., December 31, 1862, to January 7, 1862. Occupation of Paintsville January 8. Abbott's Hill January 9. Middle Creek, near Prestonsburg, January 10. At Paintsville until February 1. Expedition to Little Sandy and Piketon January 24–30. Cumberland Gap Campaign March 28-June 18. Cumberland Mountain April 28. Occupation of Cumberland Gap June 18-September 16. Tazewell July 26. Operations about Cumberland Gap August 2–6. Big Springs August 3. Tazewell August 6 and 9. Big Hill, Henderson County, August 23. Richmond September 5. Evacuation of Cumberland Gap and retreat to Greenup, on the Ohio River, September 17-October 3. Expedition to Charleston, West Va., October 21-November 10. Duty in eastern Kentucky until May 1864. Johnson County December 1, 1862. Floyd County December 4–5. Louisa March 12, 1863. Near Louisa March 25–26. Operations in eastern Kentucky March 28-April 16. Bushy Creek April 7. Expedition from Beaver Creek into southwest Virginia July 3–11 (1 company). Actions at Saylersville Oct. 10, 30; November 30 and December 1. Rock House and Laurel Creek, Wayne County, February 12, 1864. Laurel Creek Gap February 15, Forks of Beaver March 31. Quicksand Creek April 5 (Company I). Paintsville April 13. Half Mountain, Magoffin County, April 14. Louisa April 16. Pound Gap May 9. Ordered to join Sherman in the field and reported at Burnt Hickory, Ga., May 24. Atlanta Campaign May 24-September 8. Kingston May 24. Battles about Dallas, New Hope Church and Allatoona Hills May 25-June 5. Allatoona Pass June 1–2. Operations about Marietta and against Kennesaw Mountain June 10-July 2. Pine Mountain June 11–14. Lost Mountain June 15–17. Muddy Creek June 17. Noyes' Creek June 19. Kolb's Farm June 22. Assault on Kennesaw June 27. Nickajack Creek July 2–5. Chattahoochie River July 6–17. Decatur July 19. Howard House July 20. Battle of Atlanta July 22. Siege of Atlanta July 22-August 25. Utoy Creek August 5–7. Flank movement on Jonesboro August 25–30. Battle of Jonesboro August 31-September 1. Lovejoy's Station September 2–6. At Decatur until October 4. Operations against Hood in northern Alabama and middle Tennessee October 4–26. Ordered to Kentucky November 15; at Bowling Green, Ky., until December 30, and at Louisa, Ky., protecting Virginia line until September 1865.

== Casualties ==
The regiment lost a total of 201 men during service; 5 officers and 49 enlisted men killed or mortally wounded, 5 officers and 142 enlisted men died of disease.

== Commanders ==
- Colonel Laban Theodore Moore
- Colonel John C. Cochran
- Colonel George W. Gallup
- Lieutenant Colonel Henry G. Gardner
- Lieutenant Colonel Joseph R. Brown

== See also ==
- List of Kentucky Civil War Units
- Kentucky in the Civil War
