= 34th Kentucky Infantry Regiment =

- Active: October 1862 to June 24, 1865
- Country: United States
- Allegiance: Union
- Branch: Infantry

The 34th Kentucky Infantry Regiment was an infantry regiment that served in the Union Army during the American Civil War.

== Service ==
The 34th Kentucky Infantry Regiment was organized at Louisville, Kentucky from the Louisville Provost Guard and mustered in for a three-year enlistment in October 1862 under the command of Colonel Henry Dent.

The regiment was attached to District of Western Kentucky, Department of the Ohio, to June 1863. Unattached, Bowling Green, Kentucky, 2nd Division, XXIII Corps, Department of the Ohio, to October 1863. District of South Central Kentucky, 1st Division, XXIII Corps, to October 1863. Left Wing Forces, Cumberland Gap, to January 1864. District of the Clinch, Department of the Ohio, to April 1864. 1st Brigade, 4th Division, XXIII Corps, to December 1864. 2nd Brigade, 4th Division, XXIII Corps, to January 1865. 1st Brigade, 4th Division, XXIII Corps, to February 1865. 1st Brigade, 4th Division, District of East Tennessee, Department of the Cumberland, to March 1865. 2nd Brigade, 4th Division, District of East Tennessee, to June 1865.

The 34th Kentucky Infantry mustered out of service at Knoxville, Tennessee on June 24, 1865.

== Detailed service ==
Provost duty at Louisville, Ky., until May 8, 1863. (Company K at Munfordville, Ky., September 14–17, 1862.) Ordered to Bowling Green, Ky., May 8, 1863, and duty there until July 1. Moved to Glasgow, Ky., July 1, and operations against Morgan July 1–26. Garrison duty at Glasgow, Ky., until September 28. March to Knoxville, Tenn., thence to Morristown September 28-October 6. Action at Blue Springs October 10. At Morristown until December 5. Moved to Tazewell, Tenn., December 5, and duty there until January 26, 1864. Attack on Tazewell January 24. Moved to Cumberland Gap and duty there until November 8. Powell River Bridge February 22, 1864 (Companies A and D). Moved to Knoxville November 8–18, and provost duty there until February 2, 1865. At Cumberland Gap until April 24. Expedition to Gibson's Mills April 20–22. Received surrender of Colonels Pridemore, Slump, Richmond and Wicher and their commands (2,713 men). Ordered to Knoxville April 24, thence to Loudon, Tenn., and garrison duty there until June 20.

== Casualties ==
The regiment lost a total of 69 men during service; 3 enlisted men killed or mortally wounded, 2 officers and 64 enlisted men died of disease.

== Commanders ==
- Colonel Henry Dent

== See also ==
- List of Kentucky Civil War Units
- Kentucky in the Civil War
