= List of Union units from Kentucky in the American Civil War =

This is a list of military units raised by the Commonwealth of Kentucky, a neutral southern border state with dual competing Unionist and Confederate governments during the American Civil War, for service in the Union Army. Southern both geographically and culturally, an estimated 125,000 Kentuckians served as Union soldiers, almost quadruple the number of Kentuckians serving as Confederate soldiers (numbered at 35,000-45,000). The list of Kentucky's Confederate Civil War units is shown separately.

== Artillery ==
- Battery "A" Kentucky Light Artillery (Stone's)
- Battery "B" Kentucky Light Artillery (Hewitt's)
- Battery "C" Kentucky Light Artillery (Neville's)
- Battery "D" Kentucky Light Artillery - failed to complete organization

- Battery "E" Kentucky Light Artillery (Hawe's)
- 2nd Kentucky Heavy Artillery - failed to complete organization
- Simmond's Battery Kentucky Light Artillery

== Cavalry ==
- 1st Regiment Kentucky Volunteer Cavalry
- 2nd Regiment Kentucky Volunteer Cavalry
- 3rd Regiment Kentucky Volunteer Cavalry
- 4th Regiment Kentucky Volunteer Cavalry
- 5th Regiment Kentucky Volunteer Cavalry
- 6th Regiment Kentucky Volunteer Cavalry
- 7th Regiment Kentucky Volunteer Cavalry
- 8th Regiment Kentucky Volunteer Cavalry
- 9th Regiment Kentucky Volunteer Cavalry

- 10th Regiment Kentucky Volunteer Cavalry
- 11th Regiment Kentucky Volunteer Cavalry
- 12th Regiment Kentucky Volunteer Cavalry
- 13th Regiment Kentucky Volunteer Cavalry
- 14th Regiment Kentucky Volunteer Cavalry
- 15th Regiment Kentucky Volunteer Cavalry
- 16th Regiment Kentucky Volunteer Cavalry
- 17th Regiment Kentucky Volunteer Cavalry
- Munday's 1st Battalion Kentucky Volunteer Cavalry

== Engineers ==
- Patterson's Independent Company Kentucky Volunteer Engineers

== Infantry ==
- 1st Regiment Kentucky Volunteer Infantry
- 2nd Regiment Kentucky Volunteer Infantry
- 3rd Regiment Kentucky Volunteer Infantry
- 4th Regiment Kentucky Volunteer Infantry
- 5th Regiment Kentucky Volunteer Infantry (aka Louisville Legion)
- 6th Regiment Kentucky Volunteer Infantry
- 7th Regiment Kentucky Volunteer Infantry
- 8th Regiment Kentucky Volunteer Infantry
- 9th Regiment Kentucky Volunteer Infantry
- 10th Regiment Kentucky Volunteer Infantry
- 11th Regiment Kentucky Volunteer Infantry
- 12th Regiment Kentucky Volunteer Infantry
- 13th Regiment Kentucky Volunteer Infantry
- 14th Regiment Kentucky Volunteer Infantry
- 15th Regiment Kentucky Volunteer Infantry
- 16th Regiment Kentucky Volunteer Infantry
- 17th Regiment Kentucky Volunteer Infantry
- 18th Regiment Kentucky Volunteer Infantry
- 19th Regiment Kentucky Volunteer Infantry
- 20th Regiment Kentucky Volunteer Infantry
- 21st Regiment Kentucky Volunteer Infantry
- 22nd Regiment Kentucky Volunteer Infantry
- 23rd Regiment Kentucky Volunteer Infantry
- 24th Regiment Kentucky Volunteer Infantry
- 25th Regiment Kentucky Volunteer Infantry
- 26th Regiment Kentucky Volunteer Infantry
- 27th Regiment Kentucky Volunteer Infantry
- 28th Regiment Kentucky Volunteer Infantry

- 29th Regiment Kentucky Volunteer Infantry - failed to complete organization
- 30th Regiment Kentucky Volunteer Mounted Infantry
- 31st Regiment Kentucky Volunteer Infantry - failed to complete organization
- 32nd Regiment Kentucky Volunteer Infantry
- 33rd Regiment Kentucky Volunteer Infantry
- 34th Regiment Kentucky Volunteer Infantry
- 35th Regiment Kentucky Volunteer Infantry
- 36th Regiment Kentucky Volunteer Infantry - failed to complete organization
- 37th Regiment Kentucky Volunteer Mounted Infantry
- 38th Regiment Kentucky Volunteer Infantry - failed to complete organization
- 39th Regiment Kentucky Volunteer Infantry
- 40th Regiment Kentucky Volunteer Infantry
- 41st Regiment Kentucky Volunteer Infantry (30 days)
- 42nd Regiment Kentucky Volunteer Infantry (30 days)
- 43rd Regiment Kentucky Volunteer Infantry - failed to complete organization
- 44th Regiment Kentucky Volunteer Infantry - failed to complete organization
- 45th Regiment Kentucky Volunteer Mounted Infantry
- 46th Regiment Kentucky Volunteer Infantry - failed to complete organization
- 47th Regiment Kentucky Volunteer Mounted Infantry
- 48th Regiment Kentucky Volunteer Mounted Infantry
- 49th Regiment Kentucky Volunteer Mounted Infantry
- 50th Regiment Kentucky Volunteer Infantry - failed to complete organization
- 51st Regiment Kentucky Volunteer Infantry - failed to complete organization
- 52nd Regiment Kentucky Volunteer Mounted Infantry
- 53rd Regiment Kentucky Volunteer Mounted Infantry
- 54th Regiment Kentucky Volunteer Mounted Infantry
- 55th Regiment Kentucky Volunteer Mounted Infantry

== Militia ==
- Louisville Home Guard

== See also ==
- Lists of American Civil War Regiments by State
