= 7th Kentucky Cavalry Regiment =

- Active: August 16, 1862, to July 10, 1865
- Country: United States
- Allegiance: Union
- Branch: Cavalry
- Engagements: Battle of Richmond; Tullahoma Campaign; Atlanta campaign Battle of Ladiga

The 7th Kentucky Cavalry Regiment was a cavalry regiment that served in the Union Army during the American Civil War.

== Service ==
The 7th Kentucky Cavalry Regiment was organized at large and mustered in for three years at Paris, Kentucky, on August 16, 1862, under the command of Colonel Leonidas Metcalfe.

Company F was consolidated with Company M. In January 1864, Captain George T. Stacey recruited a company for the 2nd Regiment Kentucky Heavy Artillery, but it was never organized. Instead, the recruits were assigned to Company F, and at the muster out of the regiment they were transferred to Company H, 6th Kentucky Veteran Volunteer Cavalry.

Company I was consolidated with Company B. In March 1864, a reenlisted a company from the 49th Kentucky Mounted Infantry was assigned as Company I, and at the muster out of the regiment was transferred to Company B, 6th Kentucky Veteran Volunteer Cavalry.

The regiment was attached to the Army of Kentucky, unassigned, Department of the Ohio, to November 1862. District of Central Kentucky, Department of the Ohio, to March 1863. 1st Brigade, 1st Division, Cavalry Corps, Army of the Cumberland, to July 1863. 3rd Brigade, 1st Division, Cavalry Corps, Army of the Cumberland, to November 1864. 3rd Brigade, 1st Division, Cavalry Corps, Military Division Mississippi, to January 1865. 2nd Brigade, 1st Division, Cavalry Corps, Military Division Mississippi, to July 1865.

The 7th Kentucky Cavalry mustered out of service at Nashville, Tennessee, on July 10, 1865.

== Detailed service ==
Before muster participated in operations against Morgan July 4–28, 1862. Cynthiana, Kentucky, July 17 (detachment). Paris July 19. Big Hill, Madison County, August 23. Richmond August 30. Moved to Tennessee December, 1862. Hartsville December 7. Scouting at Castalian Springs until March 1863. Moved to Franklin, Tennessee. Expedition from Franklin to Columbia March 8–12. Thompson's Station March 9. Rutherford Creek March 10–11. Spring Hill March 18–19. Columbia Pike April 1. Thompson's Station May 2. Moved to Triune June 2–4. Franklin June 4. Tullahoma Campaign June 23-July 7. Expedition to Huntsville July 13–22. Detached at Bridgeport, Caperton's Ferry and Nashville until December. Operations about Mossy Creek and Dandridge, Tennessee, December 24–28. Mossy Creek Station December 24. Peck's House, near New Market, December 24. Mossy Creek December 26. Talbot's Station December 26–28. Mossy Creek December 29. Moved to Morristown. Kimbrough Cross Roads and bend of Chucky River January 16, 1864. Operations about Dandridge January 16–17. Dandridge January 17. Pigeon River, near Fair Garden, January 27. Swann's Bridge, Paris Ford. January 28. At Cleveland, Tennessee, until May. Atlanta campaign May to September. Guarding railroad in rear of army, at Wauhatchie, Tennessee, May 5 to June 18. At Lee and Gordon's Mills and Lafayette until August 4. Action at Lafayette June 24. Actions at Lost Mountain July 1–2. At Calhoun and Dalton until October 12. Pine Log Creek and near Fairmount August 14. Dalton August 14–15 (Company B). Rousseau's pursuit of Wheeler September 1–8. Resaca October 12–13. Surrender of Dalton October 13 (Company B). Near Summerville October 18. Little River, Alabama, October 20. Leesburg October 21. Ladiga, Terrapin Creek, October 28 (detachment). Moved to Louisville, Kentucky, November 3–9. McCook's pursuit of Lyon December 6–28. Hopkinsville, Kentucky, December 16. At Nashville, Tennessee, until January 9, 1865. Moved to Gravelly Springs, Alabama, and duty there and at Waterloo until March. Wilson's Raid from Chickasaw, Alabama, to Macon, Georgia, March 22-April 24. Selma April 2. Montgomery April 12. Columbus Road, near Tuskegee, April 14. Fort Tyler, West Point, April 16. Capture of Macon April 20. Duty at Macon until June and at Nashville, Tennessee, until July.

== Arms ==
The 7th Kentucky Cavalry was initially armed with Wesson carbines, 500 having been received prior to July 29, 1862. The quarterly official ordnance returns show the possession of major arms of the Civil War, but not arms such as the Wesson rifle. In December 1863, the records show the 7th armed with 120 .54 caliber Burnside's breech-loading carbines and 59 .54 caliber Sharps' rifled breech-loading carbines. The state of Kentucky purchased 700 Smith & Wesson Model No. 2 Army .32 rimfire revolvers for the unit from Kittridge & Co. They also carried Colt's Army revolvers (caliber .44) and cavalry and light cavalry sabres. Only two companies reported their stores of ammunition for carbines, and reported having cartridges for Sharps' carbines and Burnsides.

== Casualties ==
The regiment lost a total of 147 men during service; 2 officers and 22 enlisted men killed or mortally wounded, 5 officers and 118 enlisted men died of disease.

== Commanders ==
- Colonel Leonidas Metcalfe
- Colonel John K. Faulkner

== See also ==
- List of Kentucky Civil War Units
- Kentucky in the Civil War
