= 37th Kentucky Mounted Infantry Regiment =

- Active: September 17, 1863, to December 29, 1864
- Country: United States
- Allegiance: Union
- Branch: Mounted infantry
- Engagements: Battle of Cynthiana; Battle of Saltville

The 37th Kentucky Mounted Infantry Regiment was a mounted infantry regiment that served in the Union Army during the American Civil War.

== Service ==
The majority of the 37th Kentucky Mounted Infantry Regiment was organized at Glasgow, Kentucky. Companies A, B and C were mustered into service at Glasgow on September 17, 1863. Companies D, E, F, and G were mustered October 24, also at Glasgow. Captain Stroub's company, which was originally intended for the 51st Kentucky Infantry, was mustered into service at Covington, Kentucky, on September 4, and afterward consolidated with the regiment as Company H. Companies I and K were mustered at Glasgow on December 21–22. It was mustered in under the command of Colonel Charles S. Hanson.

The regiment was attached to District of South Central Kentucky, 1st Division, XXIII Corps, Department of the Ohio, to January 1864. District of Southwest Kentucky, 1st Division, XXIII Corps, to April 1864. 3rd Brigade, 1st Division, District of Kentucky, 5th Division, XXIII Corps, Department of the Ohio, to December 1864.

The 37th Kentucky Mounted Infantry mustered out of service on December 29, 1864.

== Detailed service ==
Duty at Glasgow, Ky., and in District of South Central Kentucky, operating against guerrillas and protecting public property till March, 1864. Attack on Camp at Glasgow October 6, 1863. Moved to Columbia March, 1864. Operations against Morgan May 31-June 20. Mt. Sterling, Ky., June 9. Cynthiana June 12. Operations in Eastern Kentucky till September. Bettier's Gap August 23. Burbridge's Expedition into Southwest Virginia September 20-October 17. McCormick's Gap September 20. Saltsville, Va., October 2. Bloomfield November 5. Owen County November 15. Mustered out December 29, 1864.

== Casualties ==
The regiment lost a total of 106 men during service; 8 enlisted men killed or mortally wounded, 98 enlisted men died of disease.

== Commanders ==
- Colonel Charles S. Hanson

== See also ==
- List of Kentucky Civil War Units
- Kentucky in the Civil War
