= Battery "E" Kentucky Light Artillery =

- Active: October 1863 to August 1, 1865
- Country: United States
- Allegiance: Union
- Branch: Artillery
- Engagements: Battle of Saltville

Battery "E" 1st Kentucky Light Artillery was an artillery battery that served in the Union Army during the American Civil War. It was often referred to as Hawes' Battery.

== Service ==
The battery was organized October–December 1863 at Camp Nelson and mustered in under the command of Captain John J. Hawes.

The battery was attached to District of North Central Kentucky, 1st Division, XXIII Corps, Department of the Ohio, to November 1863. District of Somerset, Kentucky, 1st Division, XXIII Corps, to January 1864. District of Southwest Kentucky, Department of the Ohio, to April 1864. 4th Brigade, 1st Division, District of Kentucky, 5th Division, XXIII Corps, to December, 1864. Garrison duty, Lexington, Kentucky, District of Kentucky, to August 1865.

Battery "E" 1st Kentucky Light Artillery mustered out of service on August 1, 1865.

== Detailed service ==
Garrison duty at Camp Nelson and Camp Burnside, Kentucky, until June 1864. Reenlisted February 1864. Duty at Lexington, Kentucky, until November 1864. Stoneman's Raid to southwest Virginia December 10–29. Kingsport December 13. Near Marion December 16–17. Saltville, Virginia, December 20–21. Duty at Lexington and Camp Nelson, Kentucky, until August 1865.

== Casualties ==
The battery lost a total of 10 men during service, all to disease.

== Commanders ==
- Captain John J. Hawes
- Captain L. E. P. Bush
- Captain Samuel E. Miller

== See also ==
- List of Kentucky Civil War Units
- Kentucky in the Civil War
