= 35th Kentucky Infantry Regiment =

- Active: September 26, 1863, to December 29, 1864
- Country: United States
- Allegiance: Union
- Branch: Infantry
- Engagements: Battle of Saltville

The 35th Kentucky Infantry Regiment was an infantry regiment that served in the Union Army during the American Civil War.

== Service ==
The 35th Kentucky Infantry Regiment was organized at Owensboro, Kentucky and mustered in for a three-year enlistment on October 20, 1863, under the command of Colonel Edmund A. Starling. Although the regiment was mounted, it was never designated as mounted infantry.

The regiment was attached to District of Southwest Kentucky, Department of the Ohio, to April 1864. 2nd Brigade, 2nd Division, District of Kentucky, 5th Division, XXIII Corps, Department of the Ohio, to July 1864. 1st Brigade, 1st Division, District of Kentucky, 5th Division, XXIII Corps, to December 1864.

The 35th Kentucky Infantry mustered out of service at Louisville, Kentucky, on December 16, 1864.

== Detailed service ==
March to Henderson, Ky., October 10, 1863; thence to Hopkinsville, Ky., and duty guarding country between Green and Cumberland Rivers from guerrillas until August 1864. Saylersville, Ky., November 30, 1863. Greenville, Ky., December 3, 1863. Scout in Meade and Breckenridge Counties May 5, 1864 (Company B). Morganfield May 6 and June 25. Slaughtersville July. Scout to Big Springs July 13–15 (detachment). Operations in Webster and Union Counties July 14–18. Pursuit of Adam Johnson's forces August 1864 (Company A). Canton and Roaring Springs August 22. Burbridge's Expedition into southwest Virginia September 20-October 17. Action at Saltville, Va., October 2. At Lexington, Ky., until November 5. Ordered to Louisville November 5.

== Casualties ==
The regiment lost a total of 57 men during service; 8 enlisted men killed or mortally wounded, 49 enlisted men died of disease.

== Commanders ==
- Colonel Edmund A. Starling

== See also ==
- List of Kentucky Civil War Units
- Kentucky in the Civil War
