= 40th Kentucky Infantry Regiment =

- Active: July 30, 1863, to December 30, 1864
- Country: United States
- Allegiance: Union
- Branch: Infantry
- Engagements: Battle of Salyersville; Battle of Cynthiana; Battle of Saltville

The 40th Kentucky Infantry Regiment was an infantry regiment that served in the Union Army during the American Civil War.

== Service ==
The 40th Kentucky Infantry Regiment was organized at Grayson and Falmouth, Kentucky, on July 30, 1863, under the command of Colonel Clinton J. True.

The regiment was attached to District of North Central Kentucky, 1st Division, XXIII Corps, Department of the Ohio, to April 1864. 1st Brigade, 2nd Division, District of Kentucky, 5th Division, XXIII Corps, Department of the Ohio, to July 1864. 1st Brigade, 1st Division, District of Kentucky, to December 1864.

The 40th Kentucky Infantry mustered out of service on December 30, 1864.

== Detailed service ==
Scout duty in north central Kentucky until December 1863. Actions at Mt. Sterling December 3 and 10, 1863. Scouting in eastern Kentucky until May 1864. Near Paintsville, Ky., April 14, 1864. Operations against Morgan May 31-June 20. Mt. Sterling June 9. Cynthiana June 12. Duty in eastern Kentucky until September. Near New Haven August 2 (Company C). Canton and Roaring Springs August 22. Burbridge's Expedition into southwest Virginia September 10-October 17. Action at Saltville, Va., October 2. Duty in eastern Kentucky until December.

== Casualties ==
The regiment lost a total of 102 men during service; 9 enlisted men killed or mortally wounded, 2 officers and 91 enlisted men died of disease.

== Commanders ==
- Colonel Clinton J. True

== See also ==
- List of Kentucky Civil War Units
- Kentucky in the Civil War
