= 30th Kentucky Mounted Infantry Regiment =

- Flag of the United States 1863–1865
- Active: February 19, 1864, to April 18, 1865
- Country: United States
- Allegiance: Union
- Branch: United States Army Volunteers
- Type: Mounted Infantry
- Size: Regiment
- Engagements: Battle of Cynthiana; Battle of Saltville; Second Battle of Saltville

The 30th Kentucky Mounted Infantry Regiment was a mounted infantry regiment that served in the Union Army during the American Civil War.

== Service ==
Companies A, B, E, & F of the 30th Kentucky Mounted Infantry Regiment were organized at Somerset and Frankfort, Kentucky and mustered in for a three-year enlistment at Frankfort on February 19, 1864. Company G was mustered on March 29, 1864. Companies C, D, H, I and K were mustered in at Camp Burnside, Kentucky, on April 5, 1864. It was mustered in under the command of Colonel Francis N. Alexander.

The regiment was attached to 4th Brigade, 1st Division, District of Kentucky, 5th Division, XXIII Corps, Department of the Ohio, to August 1864. 2nd Brigade, 1st Division, District of Kentucky, Department of the Ohio, to April 1865.

The 30th Kentucky Mounted Infantry mustered out of service on December 14, 1865.

== Detailed service ==
Operating against guerrillas in Kentucky until April 1865. Action at Lexington, Ky., June 10, 1864. Cynthiana June 12. Shelby County, Ky., September 3. Burbridge's Expedition to southwest Virginia September 20-October 17. Laurel Creek Gap and Clinch Mountain October 1. Saltsville, Va., October 2. Kingsport, Tenn., October 6. Ordered to Paris, Ky., October 25. Owen County, Ky., November 15. Stoneman's Expedition to southwest Virginia December 10–29. Brush Creek, Tenn., December 12. Kingsport, Tenn., December 13. Marion, Va., December 17–18. New Market December 18. Saltsville December 20–21. At Louisa, Ky., December 31. At Camp Nelson, Ky., January 6, 1865. Duty in Green, Taylor and Barren Counties operating against guerrillas until April. Action at Charleston January 30. Bradfordsville February 8. Mustered out April 18, 1865.

== Casualties ==
The regiment lost a total of 94 men during service; 2 officers and 21 enlisted men killed or mortally wounded, 71 enlisted men died of disease.

== Commanders ==
- Colonel Francis N. Alexander

== See also ==
- List of Kentucky Civil War Units
- Kentucky in the Civil War
