= 52nd Kentucky Mounted Infantry Regiment =

- Active: October 16, 1863, to January 17, 1865
- Country: United States
- Allegiance: Union
- Branch: Mounted infantry
- Engagements: Battle of Cynthiana

The 52nd Kentucky Mounted Infantry Regiment was a mounted infantry regiment that served in the Union Army during the American Civil War.

== Service ==
The 52nd Kentucky Mounted Infantry Regiment was organized at Franklin and Scottsville, Kentucky. Companies A, B, C, and E mustered in at Scottsville on October 16, 1863. Company D mustered in on October 17, 1863. Company F mustered in on November 12, 1863. Company G mustered in on December 21, 1863. Companies H, I, and K mustered in at Franklin on March 3, 1864. All were mustered in for one year under the command of Colonel John H. Grider.

The regiment was attached to 3rd Brigade, 1st Division, District of Kentucky, Department of the Ohio, to July 1864. 2nd Brigade, 2nd Division, District of Kentucky, Department of the Ohio, to October 1864. 1st Brigade, 2nd Division, District of Kentucky, 5th Division, XXIII Corps, Department of the Ohio, to January 1865.

The 52nd Kentucky Mounted Infantry mustered out of service January 17, 1865.

== Detailed service ==
Operations against guerrillas in southern and central Kentucky, guarding and protecting public property, and protecting lines of communication with the army operating at the front until March 1864. Operations against Forrest's Raid into Kentucky March 23-April 19, and against Morgan in eastern Kentucky May 31-June 20. Action at New Hope March 28. Mt. Sterling June 9. Cynthiana June 12. Operations in western Kentucky July–August. Action at Bells Mines July 13. Operations in Webster and Union Counties July 14–18. Morganfield July 14. Geiger's Lake July 15. Operations against Adam Johnson about Uniontown August. Grubb's Cross Roads August 21. Canton and Roaring Springs August 22. Moved to Lexington August 27, thence to Bowling Green August 30, and to Nashville, Tennessee. Scottsville December 8 (1 company).

== Casualties ==
The regiment lost a total of 59 men during service; 1 officer and 10 enlisted men killed or mortally wounded, 48 enlisted men died of disease.

== Commanders ==
- Colonel John H. Grider

== See also ==
- List of Kentucky Civil War Units
- Kentucky in the Civil War
