= 47th Kentucky Mounted Infantry Regiment =

- Active: October 5, 1863, to April 12, 1865
- Country: United States
- Allegiance: Union
- Branch: Mounted infantry
- Engagements: Battle of Cynthiana

The 47th Kentucky Mounted Infantry Regiment was a mounted infantry regiment that served in the Union Army during the American Civil War.

== Service ==
The 47th Kentucky Mounted Infantry Regiment was organized at Camp Nelson and Irvine, Kentucky, mustered in for one year in January 1864 under the command of Colonel Andrew Hamilton Clark.

The regiment was attached to District of North Central Kentucky, 1st Division, XXIII Corps, Department of the Ohio, to January 1864. District of Southwest Kentucky, 1st Division, XXIII Corps, to April 1864. 4th Brigade, 1st Division, District of Kentucky, 5th Division, XXIII Corps, to July 1864. Camp Nelson, Kentucky, District and Department of Kentucky to April 1865.

Companies A, B, C, D, E, F, G, and H of the 47th Kentucky Mounted Infantry mustered out of service at Lexington, Kentucky, on December 26, 1864; Companies I and K mustered out of service on April 12, 1865.

It performed scouting and patrol duty in eastern Kentucky until June 1864. It engaged in operations against Morgan (May 31–June 20); Mount Sterling, Kentucky (June 9); Keller's Bridge, near Cynthiana, Kentucky (June 11); and Cynthiana (June 12). It was stationed at Camp Nelson, Kentucky, and on the line of the Kentucky Central Railroad until April 1865.

The regiment lost a total of 73 men during its service: One enlisted man was killed, while four officers and 68 enlisted men died of disease.

== Commanders ==
- Colonel Andrew Hamilton Clark

== See also ==
- List of Kentucky Civil War Units
- Kentucky in the Civil War
