= 32nd Kentucky Infantry Regiment =

- Active: August 1862 to August 12, 1863
- Country: United States
- Allegiance: Union
- Branch: Infantry
- Engagements: Battle of Perryville

The 32nd Kentucky Infantry Regiment was an infantry regiment that served in the Union Army during the American Civil War.

== Service ==
The 32nd Kentucky Infantry Regiment was organized at Frankfort and Camp Burnside, Kentucky and mustered in for a three-year enlistment in August 1862 under the command of Colonel Thomas Z. Morrow. Only eight of ten companies were filled; Companies I and K were never organized.

The regiment was attached to District of Western Kentucky, Department of the Ohio, to April 1863. 2nd Brigade, District of Western Kentucky, Department of the Ohio, to June 1863. 1st Brigade, 1st Division, XXIII Corps, Army of the Ohio, to August 1863.

The 32nd Kentucky Infantry mustered out of service beginning on May 28, 1863, and ending on August 12, 1863.

== Detailed service ==
Engaged in guard and scouting duty at various points in District of Western Kentucky, principally at Hopkinsville, Camp Burnside, Danville, Lexington, Somerset, Stanford, and Lebanon. A part of the regiment participated in the defense of Kentucky against Bragg's invasion and subsequent pursuit, being present at the battle of Perryville, Kentucky, October 8, 1862, with Garrard's Detachment. Mustered out May 28 to August 12, 1863.

== Casualties ==
The regiment lost a total of 43 men during service; 1 officer and 42 enlisted men died of disease.

== Commanders ==
- Colonel Thomas Z. Morrow

== See also ==
- List of Kentucky Civil War Units
- Kentucky in the Civil War
