= 49th Kentucky Mounted Infantry Regiment =

- Active: September 19, 1863, to December 26, 1864
- Country: United States
- Allegiance: Union
- Branch: Mounted infantry

The 49th Kentucky Mounted Infantry Regiment was a mounted infantry regiment that served in the Union Army during the American Civil War.

== Service ==
The 49th Kentucky Mounted Infantry Regiment was organized at Camp Nelson and mustered in for one year on September 19, 1863, under the command of Colonel John G. Eve.

The regiment was attached to District of Somerset, Kentucky, 1st Division, XXIII Corps, Department of the Ohio, to January 1864. District of Southwest Kentucky, 1st Division, XXIII Corps, to April 1864. 4th Brigade, 1st Division, District of Kentucky, 5th Division, XXIII Corps, Department of the Ohio, to July 1864. Camp Nelson, District of Kentucky, to December 1864.

The 49th Kentucky Mounted Infantry mustered out of service at Lexington, Kentucky, on December 26, 1864.

== Detailed service ==
Moved to Somerset, Kentucky, October 28, 1863, and duty in that vicinity until January 1864. Moved to Camp Burnside, Kentucky, January 3–4, and duty there until August 1864. At Lexington August and at Camp Nelson until October. Ordered to Tennessee October 1 and railroad guard duty near Murfreesboro and between Wartrace and Mill Creek until November. At Lexington, Kentucky, until December.

== Casualties ==
The regiment lost a total of 76 men during service; 1 enlisted man killed, 1 officer and 74 enlisted men died of disease.

== Commanders ==
- Colonel John G. Eve

== See also ==
- List of Kentucky Civil War Units
- Kentucky in the Civil War
