= 26th Kentucky Infantry Regiment =

- Active: July 1861 to July 10, 1865
- Country: United States
- Allegiance: Union
- Branch: Infantry
- Engagements: Battle of Shiloh; Siege of Corinth; Battle of Perryville; Battle of Saltville; Battle of Nashville; Carolinas campaign

The 26th Kentucky Infantry Regiment was an infantry regiment that served in the Union Army during the American Civil War.

== Service ==
The 26th Kentucky Infantry Regiment was organized at Owensboro, Kentucky July - November 1861 and mustered in at Nashville, Tennessee, for a three-year enlistment on March 5, 1862.

The regiment was attached to 14th Brigade, Army of the Ohio, November 1861 to December 1861. 14th Brigade, 5th Division, Army of the Ohio, to September 1862. 14th Brigade, 5th Division, II Corps, Army of the Ohio, to November 1862. 2nd Brigade, 3rd Division, Left Wing, XIV Corps, Army of the Cumberland, November 1862. District of Western Kentucky, Department of the Ohio, to June 1863. Unattached, 2nd Division, XXIII Corps, Army of the Ohio, to August 1863. Unattached, Bowling Green, Kentucky, 1st Division, XXIII Corps, to October 1863. District of Southwest Kentucky, 1st Division, XXIII Corps, to April 1864. 2nd Brigade, 2nd Division, District of Kentucky, 5th Division, XXIII Corps, to December 1864. 1st Brigade, 2nd Division, XXIII Corps, Army of the Ohio, to February 1865, and Department of North Carolina to July 1865.

The 26th Kentucky Infantry mustered out of service at Louisville, Kentucky, on July 10, 1865.

== Detailed service ==
Action at Woodbury, Ky., October 29, 1861. Morgantown, Ky., October 31, 1861. Moved from Owensboro to Calhoun, Ky., November 1861, and duty there until February 1862. Action at Whippoorwill Creek, Ky., December 1, 1861. Moved to South Carrollton, thence to Calhoun, Owensboro and Nashville, Tenn., February 1862. March to Savannah, Tenn., March 17-April 6. Battle of Shiloh, April 7. Advance on and siege of Corinth, Miss., April 29-May 30. Buell's Campaign in northern Alabama and middle Tennessee June to August. March to Nashville, Tenn., thence to Louisville, Ky., in pursuit of Bragg August 21-September 26. Pursuit of Bragg into Kentucky October 1–22. Battle of Perryville, Ky., October 8. Nelson's Cross Roads October 18. March to Nashville, Tenn., October 22-November 7. Ordered to Bowling Green, Ky., November 22, and duty there until January 1863. Action at Woodbury, Ky., July 5, 1863. Regiment veteranized at Camp Nelson, Ky., January 1864, and on furlough until March. Duty at Bowling Green, Ky. Mounted and engaged in post duty and scouting from Bowling Green to the Ohio River, and from western part of Kentucky to Lexington until December 1864. Burbridge's Expedition into southwest Virginia September 20-October 17. Saltsville, Va., October 2. At Bowling Green until December. Ordered to Nashville, Tenn., December 7. Battle of Nashville, December 15–16. Pursuit of Hood to the Tennessee River December 17–28. At Clifton, Tenn., until January 15, 1865. Moved to Washington, D.C., thence to Fort Fisher, N.C., January 15-February 12. Fort Anderson February 18–19. Town Creek February 20. Capture of Wilmington February 22. Campaign of the Carolinas March 1-April 26. Advance on Goldsboro March 6–21. Occupation of Goldsboro March 21, Advance on Raleigh April 10–14. Occupation of Raleigh April 14. Bennett's House April 26. Surrender of Johnston and his army. Duty at Saulsbury, N.C., until July. Ordered to Louisville, Ky.

== Casualties ==
The regiment lost a total of 173 men during service; 2 officers and 27 enlisted men killed or mortally wounded, 2 officers and 142 enlisted men died of disease. 1st Lieutenant William C Burgher, Company E, 26th Kentucky Infantry, USA was mortally wounded July 29, 1862 in Russellville Kentucky during an assault while attempting to confiscate a horse for use by the Army.

== Commanders ==
- Colonel Stephen G. Burbridge - promoted to Brigadier General on June 9, 1862
- Colonel Cicero Maxwell - died on February 17, 1865, from wounds received at the Battle of Nashville
- Lieutenant Colonel T. B. Fairleigh

== See also ==
- List of Kentucky Civil War Units
- Kentucky in the Civil War
