= 55th Kentucky Mounted Infantry Regiment =

- Active: November 1864 to September 19, 1865
- Country: United States
- Allegiance: Union
- Branch: Mounted infantry
- Engagements: Second Battle of Saltville

The 55th Kentucky Mounted Infantry Regiment was a mounted infantry regiment that served in the Union Army during the American Civil War.

== Service ==
The 55th Kentucky Mounted Infantry Regiment was organized at Covington, Kentucky and mustered in September 1864 under the command of Colonel Weden O'Neal.

The regiment was attached to Military District of Kentucky and Department of Kentucky, to September 1865.

The 55th Kentucky Mounted Infantry mustered out of service on September 19, 1865.

== Detailed service ==
Regiment mounted and assigned to duty in counties bordering on the Kentucky Central Railroad until December 1864. Stoneman's Raid into southwest Virginia December 10–29. Near Marion December 17–18. Saltville December 20–21. Capture and destruction of salt works. Operating against guerrillas in counties west of the Kentucky Central Railroad and the counties of Campbell, Bracken, Mason, Fleming, Nicholas, Harrison and Pendleton, east of the Kentucky Central Railroad until September 1865.

== Casualties ==
The regiment lost a total of 38 men during service; 7 enlisted men killed, 2 officers and 29 enlisted men died of disease.

== Commanders ==
- Colonel Weden O'Neal

== See also ==
- List of Kentucky Civil War Units
- Kentucky in the Civil War
