= Skirmish at Abingdon =

Battle of the American Civil War

- Part of The American Civil War
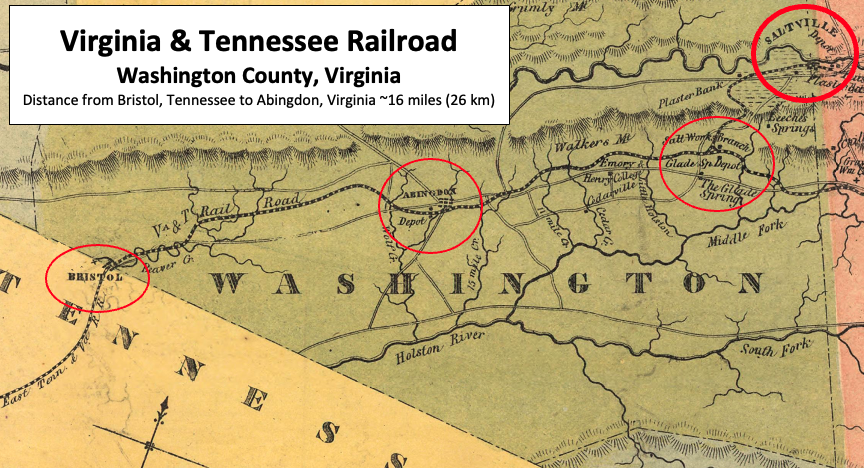
Date	December 15, 1864
Location	Washington County, Virginia
Result	Union victory

Belligerents
United States Union	(Confederate States of America) Confederacy (CSA)

Commanders and leaders
George Stoneman	John C. Breckinridge

Strength
Unknown	Unknown

Casualties and losses
Unknown killed and wounded	Unknown killed and wounded

In the American Civil War, a Skirmish at Abingdon, Virginia, between Union Army and Confederate States Army forces occurred on December 15, 1864, during Stoneman's 1864 Raid. Skirmishing took place near Abingdon with Union forces consisting mostly of cavalry regiments from Tennessee. The action is listed as a skirmish in Dyer's Compendium of the War of the Rebellion.

== Notes ==
=== References ===
- Dyer, Frederick H. (1908). A Compendium of the War of the Rebellion. Des Moines, Iowa: Dyer Pub. Co. OCLC 1028851810.
- Stephens, Ann S. (1867). Pictorial History of the War for the Union : A Complete and Reliable History of the War from its Commencement to its Close ... Together with a Complete Chronological Analysis of the War. New York City: B.W. Hitchcock. OCLC 5967902.
