= Patterson's Independent Company Kentucky Volunteer Engineers =

- Active: September 25, 1861 to January 22, 1865
- Country: United States
- Allegiance: Union
- Branch: Engineer
- Engagements: Battle of Mill Springs; Battle of Arkansas Post; Battle of Port Gibson; Battle of Raymond; Battle of Champion Hill; Battle of Big Black River Bridge; Siege of Vicksburg, May 19 & 22 assaults Red River Campaign

Patterson's Independent Company Kentucky Volunteer Engineers was an engineer company that served in the Union Army during the American Civil War.

== Service ==
Patterson's Company was organized at Camp Haskin near Somerset, Kentucky and mustered into service on September 25, 1861, under the command of Captain William F. Patterson.

The regiment served unattached, Army of the Ohio, to March 1862. Engineers, 7th Division, Army of the Ohio, to October 1862. Cumberland Division, District of West Virginia, Department of the Ohio, to November 1862. 9th Division, Right Wing, XIII Corps (Old), Department of the Tennessee, to December 1862. Unattached, Sherman's Yazoo Expedition, to January 1863. Unattached, 9th Division, XIII Corps, to July 1863. Unattached, XIII Corps, Army of the Tennessee and Department of the Gulf, to October 1863. Unattached, XIII Corps, Texas, to July 1864. Engineer Brigade, Department of the Gulf, to January 1865.

Patterson's Company mustered out of service at Louisville, Kentucky on January 22, 1865.

== Detailed service ==
Constructed defenses for Camp Haskins and Somerset, Ky., until January 1862. Action at Mill Springs, Ky., January 19. Repair roads from Somerset to Stanford, Ky., until April 12. Moved to Cumberland Ford April 2–20, repairing roads en route. Cumberland Gap Campaign May 1-June 18. Occupation of Cumberland Gap June 18-September 17. Retreat to Greenup on the Ohio River September 17-October 3. Expedition to Charleston, Va., October 21-November 10. Moved to Memphis, Tenn., November 10–15. At Memphis, Tenn., until December 20. Sherman's Yazoo Expedition December 20, 1862 to January 3, 1863. Chickasaw Bayou December 26–28. Chickasaw Bluff December 29. Expedition to Arkansas Post, Ark., January 3–10, 1863. Assault and capture Fort Hindman, Arkansas Post, January 10–11. Moved to Young's Point, La., January 14–22, and engineer duty there until March 30. Moved to Richmond, La., March 30. Built floating bridge across Bayou Roundaway April 1. Movement on Bruinsburg, Mississippi and turning Grand Gulf April 25–30. Battle of Port Gibson May 1. Took advance of Logan's 3rd Division, XVII Corps, and built bridge over Bayou Pierre May 2–3. Battles of Raymond May 12; Champion Hill May 16; Big Black River May 27. Siege of Vicksburg May 18-July 4. Assaults on Vicksburg May 19 and 22. Advance on Jackson, Miss., July 4–10. Siege of Jackson July 10–17. Moved to New Orleans August 5–27, and duty there until October 5. Western Louisiana Campaign October 5-November 1. Vermilion Bayou October 3 and 10. Moved to New Orleans November 1, thence to Brazos, Santiago, Texas, November 15–20, and to Aransas Pass November 21. Advance up coast to Pass Cavallo November 22-December 7. Constructed bridge 300 yards long across Cedar Bayou on November 25. At Pass Cavallo until April 19, 1864, building hospitals, signal stations, warehouses and wharves. Moved to Alexandria, La., April 19–29. Construction of dam at Alexandria April 29-May 10. Retreat to Morganza May 13–20. Mansura May 16. Yellow Bayou May 18–19. Moved to New Orleans, La., June 1, and reported to Engineer Department July 3. Engaged in working lumber in Cypress Swamp until November 7. Ordered to New Orleans, thence moved to Louisville, Ky., November 23-December 1.

== Casualties ==
The regiment lost a total of 8 men during service, all due to disease.

== Commanders ==
- Captain William F. Patterson

== See also ==
- List of Kentucky Civil War Units
- Kentucky in the Civil War
