= 17th Kentucky Cavalry Regiment =

- Active: April 25, 1865 - September 20, 1865
- Country: United States
- Allegiance: Union
- Branch: Cavalry

The 17th Kentucky Cavalry Regiment was a cavalry regiment that served in the Union Army during the American Civil War.

== Service ==
The 17th Kentucky Cavalry Regiment was organized at Russellville, Kentucky and mustered in for one year. It mustered in under the command of Colonel Samuel F. Johnson.

The regiment was attached to Military Department of Kentucky and assigned to duty at Hopkinsville, Kentucky, and in southern Kentucky, along the Louisville and Nashville Railroad.

The 17th Kentucky Cavalry mustered out on September 20, 1865.

== Casualties ==
The regiment lost no members during service.

== Commanders ==
- Colonel Samuel F. Johnson

== See also ==
- List of Kentucky Civil War Units
- Kentucky in the Civil War
