= 15th Kentucky Cavalry Regiment =

- Active: October 1862 - October 29, 1863
- Country: United States
- Allegiance: Union
- Branch: Cavalry

The 15th Kentucky Cavalry Regiment was a cavalry regiment that served in the Union Army during the American Civil War.

== Service ==
The 15th Kentucky Cavalry Regiment was organized at Owensboro, Kentucky and mustered in for one year under the command of Lieutenant Colonel Gabriel Netter.

The regiment was attached to District of Columbus, Kentucky, Department of the Tennessee, to November 1862. District of Columbus, Kentucky, XIII Corps, Department of the Tennessee, to January 1863. District of Columbus, Kentucky, XVI Corps, to August 1863. Detached Brigade, District of Columbus, Kentucky, 6th Division, XVI Corps, to October 1863.

The 15th Kentucky Cavalry mustered out of service beginning October 6, 1863, and ending October 29, 1863.

== Detailed service ==
Garrison duty at Paducah, Kentucky, and at various points in District of Columbus until October 1863. Scout from Fort Heiman into Tennessee May 26-June 2, 1863 (Companies A and D). Spring Creek, Tennessee, June 29. Lexington, Tennessee, June 29. Expedition from Clifton in pursuit of Biffle's, Forrest's and Newsome's Cavalry July 22–27. Expedition from Paducah, Kentucky, to McLemoresville, Tennessee, September 20–30.

== Casualties ==
The regiment lost a total of 58 men during service; 1 officer and 2 enlisted men killed or mortally wounded, 1 officer and 54 enlisted men died of disease.

== Commanders ==
- Lieutenant Colonel Gabriel Netter

== See also ==
- List of Kentucky Civil War Units
- Kentucky in the Civil War
