= 18th Kentucky Infantry Regiment =

- Active: February 8, 1862, to July 18, 1865
- Country: United States
- Allegiance: Union
- Branch: Infantry
- Engagements: Battle of Richmond; Tullahoma Campaign; Battle of Chickamauga; Chattanooga campaign Battle of Missionary Ridge; Atlanta campaign Sherman's March to the Sea; Carolinas campaign Battle of Bentonville

The 18th Kentucky Infantry Regiment was an infantry regiment that served in the Union Army during the American Civil War.

== Service ==
The 18th Kentucky Infantry Regiment was organized at large and mustered in for a three-year enlistment on February 8, 1862, under the command of Colonel William A. Warner.

The regiment served unattached, Army of the Ohio, to August 1862. Cruft's Brigade, Nelson's Division, Richmond, Kentucky, Army of Kentucky, to September 1862. 1st Brigade, 2nd Division, Army of Kentucky, Department of the Ohio, to October 1862. Unattached, Army of Kentucky, Department of the Ohio, to December 1862. 1st Brigade, 2nd Division, Army of Kentucky, to February 1863. Crook's Brigade, Baird's Division, Army of Kentucky, Department of the Cumberland, to June 1863. 3rd Brigade, 4th Division, XIV Corps, Army of the Cumberland, to October 1863. 3rd Brigade, 3rd Division, XIV Corps to June 1865. 1st Brigade, 3rd Division, XIV Corps, to July 1865.

The 18th Kentucky Infantry mustered out of service at Louisville, Kentucky, on July 18, 1865.

== Detailed service ==
Duty guarding Covington & Lexington Railroad. Headquarters at Falmouth, Ky., until April 16, 1862, and at Lexington, Ky., until August 20, 1862. Affairs in Owen County June 20 and 23. Operations in Kentucky against Morgan July 4–28. Action at Cynthiana July 17. Paris July 19. Mr. Sterling, Ky., July 29. Moved to Richmond, Ky., August 20. Battle of Richmond, Ky., August 30. Regiment mostly captured; those not captured retreat to Louisville, Ky.; thence moved to Covington, Ky., September 28; thence to Paris, Ky., and duty there until December 5. Moved to Lexington, Ky., December 5; thence to Louisville, Ky., January 27, 1863, and to Nashville, Tenn., February 2. Moved to Carthage and duty there until June 2, Moved to Murfreesboro, Tenn., June 2–7. Tullahoma Campaign June 23-July 7. Hoover's Gap June 24–26. Occupation of Tullahoma July 1. Occupation of middle Tennessee until August 16. Passage of Cumberland Mountains and Tennessee River and Chickamauga Campaign August 16-September 22. Catlett's Gap, Pigeon Mountain, September 15–18. Battle of Chickamauga September 19–21. Rossville Gap September 21, Siege of Chattanooga, September 22-November 23. Reopening Tennessee River October 26–29. Brown's Ferry October 27, Chattanooga-Ringgold Campaign November 23–27. Orchard Knob November 23–24. Missionary Ridge November 25. Duty at Chattanooga until January 1864. Regiment veteranized January 5, and veterans on leave until March. Moved to Nashville, Tenn., March 12; thence march to Ringgold, Ga., March 22-May 7. Atlanta Campaign May to September. Assigned May 10 to post duty at Ringgold, Ga. Relieved September 25 and moved to Atlanta, Ga. Operations against Hood in northern Georgia and northern Alabama October 3–26. March to the sea November 10. Siege of Savannah December 10–21. Campaign of the Carolinas January to April 1865. Fayetteville, N.C., March 11. Battle of Bentonville, N.C., March 19–21. Occupation of Goldsboro March 24. Non-veterans mustered out April 4, 1865. Advance on Raleigh, N.C., April 10–14. Occupation of Raleigh April 14. Bennett's House April 26. Surrender of Johnston and his army. March to Washington, D.C., via Richmond, Va., April 29-May 30. Grand Review of the Armies May 24. Moved to Louisville, Ky., June.

== Casualties ==
The regiment lost a total of 243 men during service; 5 officers and 85 enlisted men killed or mortally wounded, 1 officer and 152 enlisted men died of disease.

== Commanders ==
- Colonel William A. Warner

== See also ==
- List of Kentucky Civil War Units
- Kentucky in the Civil War
