= Battery "B" Kentucky Light Artillery =

- Active: October 8, 1861 to November 16, 1864
- Country: United States
- Allegiance: Union
- Branch: Artillery
- Engagements: Battle of Stones River; Tullahoma Campaign

Battery "B" 1st Kentucky Light Artillery was an artillery battery that served in the Union Army during the American Civil War. It was often referred to as Hewitt's Battery.

== Service ==
The battery was organized at Camp Dick Robinson from Company D, 3rd Kentucky Infantry and mustered in for a three-year enlistment on October 8, 1861, under the command of Captain John M. Hewitt.

The battery was attached to Thomas' Command, Camp Dick Robinson, Kentucky, to December 1861. Artillery, 1st Division, Army of the Ohio, to March 1862. Unattached Artillery, Army of the Ohio, March 1862. 23rd Independent Brigade, Army of the Ohio, to September 1862. Artillery, 8th Division, Army of the Ohio, to November 1862. Artillery, 2nd Division, Center, XIV Corps, Army of the Cumberland, to January 1863. Artillery, 2nd Division, XIV Corps, to October 1863. Unattached Army of the Cumberland, to December 1863. Artillery Brigade, XII Corps, Army of the Cumberland, to April 1864. Unattached Artillery, Department of the Cumberland, to August 1864. Defenses Nashville & Northwestern Railroad to October 1864. Artillery Brigade, IV Corps, to November 1864.

Battery "B" 1st Kentucky Light Artillery mustered out of service at Louisville, Kentucky on November 16, 1864.

== Detailed service ==
At Campbellsville, Ky., December 1861. At Beech Grove, Ky., January 1862. March to relief of Thomas at Mill Springs, Ky., January 19–21. Moved to Louisville, Ky., thence to Nashville, Tenn., February 10-March 2. Advance on Murfreesboro March 17–19. Duty at Murfreesboro, Columbia, Shelbyville and Elk River Bridge guarding line of Chattanooga Railroad until July. Negley's Expedition to Chattanooga June 1–15 (1 section). Chattanooga June 7–8. Battle of Murfreesboro July 13. Captain Hewitt and four guns captured. At Manchester August (1 section), and at Nashville until December. Siege of Nashville September 12-November 7. Franklin Pike, near Nashville, December 14. Advance on Murfreesboro December 26–30. Battle of Stones River December 30–31, 1862 and January 1–3, 1863. At Murfreesboro until June. Tullahoma Campaign June 23-July 7. Hoover's Gap June 24–26. Occupation of Tullahoma July 1. Elk River Bridge July 3 and 14. Stationed at Elk River Bridge guarding line of Nashville Chattanooga Railroad until February 1864. At Decherd Station until April and at Tullahoma, Tenn., until November. Ordered to Louisville, Ky. for muster out.

== Casualties ==
The battery lost a total of 22 men during service; 2 enlisted men killed or mortally wounded, 20 enlisted men died of disease.

== Commanders ==
- Captain John M. Hewitt
- Lieutenant Alban A. Ellsworth

== See also ==
- List of Kentucky Civil War Units
- Kentucky in the Civil War
