= Munday's 1st Battalion Kentucky Cavalry =

- Active: December 1861 to January 1862
- Country: United States
- Allegiance: Union
- Branch: Cavalry
- Engagements: Battle of Richmond

Munday's 1st Battalion Kentucky Cavalry was a cavalry regiment that served in the Union Army during the American Civil War.

== Service ==
Munday's 1st Battalion Kentucky Cavalry was organized at Lexington, Kentucky in December 1861 and mustered in for three years under the command of Major Reuben Munday.

The regiment was attached to 12th Brigade, Army of the Ohio, to February 1862. 7th Division, Army of the Ohio, to October 1862.

Munday's 1st Battalion Kentucky Cavalry ceased when it was assigned to the 6th Kentucky Cavalry as Companies A, B, C, D, and E in October 1862.

== Detailed service ==
Ordered to Lebanon, Kentucky, then to London January 8, 1862. Expedition from central Kentucky to the Cumberland River January 31-February 12. Flat Lick Ford, Cumberland River, February 14. Cumberland Gap Campaign March 28-June 18. Occupation of Cumberland Gap June 18 to September 17. Tazewell, Tennessee July 26. Operations about Cumberland Gap August 2–17. Tazewell August 6. Rogers' Gap August 16. Pine Mountain August 17. Red Bird Creek August 25. Richmond, Kentucky, August 30. Retreat from Cumberland Gap to the Ohio River September 17-October 3.

== Commanders ==
- Major Reuben Munday

== See also ==
- 6th Regiment Kentucky Volunteer Cavalry
- List of Kentucky Civil War Units
- Kentucky in the Civil War
