= 53rd Kentucky Mounted Infantry Regiment =

- Active: September 1864 to September 17, 1865
- Country: United States
- Allegiance: Union
- Branch: Mounted infantry
- Engagements: Battle of Saltville

The 53rd Kentucky Mounted Infantry Regiment was a mounted infantry regiment that served in the Union Army during the American Civil War.

== Service ==
The 53rd Kentucky Mounted Infantry Regiment was organized at Covington, Kentucky and mustered in September 1864 under the command of Colonel Clinton J. True.

The regiment was attached to Military District of Kentucky and Department of Kentucky, to September 1865.

The 53rd Kentucky Mounted Infantry mustered out of service September 17, 1865, in Louisville, Kentucky.

== Detailed service ==
Guard duty along the Kentucky Central Railroad between Lexington and Cincinnati. Scouting in central Kentucky and operating against guerrillas until November 1864. Moved to Crab Orchard, Kentucky, November 24, and joined General Stoneman. Stoneman's Raid into southwest Virginia December 10–29. Near Marion, Virginia, December 17–18. Saltville, Virginia, December 20–21. Capture and destruction of salt works. Operating against guerrillas at various points in Kentucky by detachments until September 1865.

== Casualties ==
The regiment lost a total of 49 men during service; 1 officer and 8 enlisted men killed or mortally wounded, 40 enlisted men died of disease.

== Commanders ==
- Colonel John H. Grider

Fifty-third Infantry (Mounted).—Colonel, Clinton J. True; Lieut.-Colonel, W. C. Johnson; Major, James G. Francis.

== See also ==
- List of Kentucky Civil War Units
- Kentucky in the Civil War
