= List of naval ships named for Kentucky =

There have been 3 Naval ships named for Kentucky:

- USS Kentucky (BB-6), a Kearsarge-class battleship, sailed with the Great White Fleet.
- USS Kentucky (BB-66), an Iowa-class battleship, was under construction in 1947 when she was cancelled.
- USS Kentucky (SSBN-737), an Ohio-class "Trident" submarine.

There have also been 9 Naval ships named for cities in Kentucky

- USS Covington (1863), a side wheel steamer, purchased by the Union during the American Civil War
- USS Covington (ID-1409), a troop transport ship sunk by the German submarine U-86 in 1918
- USS Covington (PF-56), a Tacoma-class frigate built during World War II
- USS Lexington (1861), a timberclad gunboat in commission from 1861 to 1865
- USS Louisville (1862) was an ironclad steamboat used during the Civil War.
- USS Louisville was the American Line steamship St. Louis renamed and used in 1918 as a troop transport.
- USS Louisville (CA-28) was a heavy cruiser commissioned in 1931 and active in World War II, sustaining several kamikaze hits.
- USS Louisville (SSN-724) is a Los Angeles-class nuclear attack submarine commissioned in 1986.
- USS Paducah (PG-18), a Dubuque-class gunboat commissioned in 1905
