= 54th Kentucky Mounted Infantry Regiment =

- Active: September 1864 to September 1, 1865
- Country: United States
- Allegiance: Union
- Branch: Mounted infantry
- Engagements: Second Battle of Saltville

The 54th Kentucky Mounted Infantry Regiment was a mounted infantry regiment that served in the Union Army during the American Civil War.

== Service ==
The 54th Kentucky Mounted Infantry Regiment was organized at New Castle, Kentucky and mustered in September 1864 under the command of Colonel Harvey M. Buckley.

The regiment was attached to Military District of Kentucky and Department of Kentucky, to September 1865.

The 54th Kentucky Mounted Infantry mustered out of service at Louisville, Kentucky on September 1, 1865.

== Detailed service ==
Operating against guerrillas in Henry County, Kentucky, until December 1864. Stoneman's Raid into southwest Virginia December 10–29. Near Marion, Virginia, December 17–18. Saltville, Virginia, December 20–21. Capture and destruction of salt works. Provost duty in country about Lexington, Kentucky, and operating against guerrillas until September 1865.

== Casualties ==
The regiment lost a total of 30 men during service; 1 enlisted man killed, 29 enlisted men died of disease.

== Commanders ==
- Colonel Harvey M. Buckley

== See also ==
- List of Kentucky Civil War Units
- Kentucky in the Civil War
