= 15th Kentucky Infantry Regiment =

- Active: December 14, 1861, to January 14, 1865
- Country: United States
- Allegiance: Union
- Branch: Infantry
- Size: 952
- Engagements: Battle of Perryville; Battle of Stones River; Tullahoma Campaign; Battle of Chickamauga; Battle of Missionary Ridge; Atlanta campaign Battle of Resaca; Battle of Kennesaw Mountain; Battle of Peachtree Creek; Siege of Atlanta; Battle of Jonesboro

The 15th Kentucky Infantry Regiment was an infantry regiment that served in the Union Army during the American Civil War.

== Service ==
The 15th Kentucky Infantry Regiment was organized at New Haven, Kentucky, and mustered in for a three-year enlistment on December 14, 1860, under the command of Colonel Curran Pope.

The regiment was attached to 16th Brigade, Army of the Ohio, to December 1861. 17th Brigade, Army of the Ohio, to January 1862. 17th Brigade, 3rd Division, Army of the Ohio, to September 1862. 17th Brigade, 3rd Division, I Corps, Army of the Ohio, to November 1862. 2nd Brigade, 1st Division, Center, XIV Corps, Army of the Cumberland, to January 1863. 2nd Brigade, 1st Division, XIV Corps, to April 1863. 1st Brigade, 2nd Division, XIV Corps, to October 1863. 1st Brigade, 1st Division, XIV Corps, to November 1863. Post of Chattanooga to April 1864. 1st Brigade, 1st Division, XIV Corps, to November 1864.

The 15th Kentucky Infantry mustered out of service at Louisville, Kentucky, on January 14, 1865.

== Detailed Service Timeline ==
Duty at New Haven and Bacon Creek, Ky., until February 1862. Advance on Bowling Green, Ky., February 10–15. Occupation of Bowling Green February 15–22. Advance on Nashville, Tenn., February 22–25. Advance on Murfreesboro, Tenn., March 17–19. Occupation of Shelbyville, Fayetteville, and advance on Huntsville, Ala., March 18-April 11. Capture of Huntsville April 11. Advance on Decatur, Ala., April 11–14. Action at West Bridge, near Bridgeport, Ala., April 29. At Huntsville until August. Guntersville and Law's Landing July 28. Old Deposit Ferry July 29, March to Louisville, Ky., in pursuit of Bragg August 27-September 26. Pursuit of Bragg into Kentucky October 1–15. Battle of Perryville October 8. March to Nashville, Tenn., October 16-November 7, and duty there until December 26. Bacon Creek, near Munfordville, Ky., December 26 (detachment). Advance on Murfreesboro December 26–30. Battle of Stones River December 30–31, 1862 and January 1–3, 1863. At Murfreesboro until June 1863. Tullahoma Campaign June 23-July 7. Hoover's Gap June 24–26. Occupation of Tullahoma July 1. Occupation of middle Tennessee until August 16. Passage of Cumberland Mountains and Tennessee River and Chickamauga Campaign August 16-September 22. Steven's Gap September 6. Davis Cross Roads or Dug Gap September 11. Battle of Chickamauga, September 19–21. Rossville Gap September 21. Siege of Chattanooga September 24-November 23. Chattanooga-Ringgold Campaign November 23–27. Missionary Ridge November 25. In reserve, post duty at Chattanooga, until April 1864. Atlanta Campaign May 1-September 8. Demonstration on Rocky Faced Ridge May 8–11. Buzzard's Roost Gap May 8–9. Battle of Resaca May 14–15. Advance on Dallas May 18–25. Operations on line of Pumpkin Vine Creek and battles about Dallas, New Hope Church and Allatoona Hills May 25-June 5. Operations about Marietta and against Kennesaw Mountain June 10-July 2. Pine Hill June 11–14. Lost Mountain June 15–17. Assault on Kennesaw June 27. Ruff's Station July 4. Chattahoochie River July 6–17. Buckhead, Nancy's Creek, July 18. Battle of Peachtree Creek July 19–20. Siege of Atlanta July 22-August 25. Flank movement on Jonesboro August 25–30. Red Oak August 29. Battle of Jonesboro August 31-September 1. Lovejoy's Station September 2–6. Operations in northern Georgia and northern Alabama against Hood October 1–26. Duty at Chattanooga, and Bridgeport, Ala., until December. Ordered to Louisville, Ky..

== Casualties ==
The regiment lost a total of 251 men during service; 9 officers and 128 enlisted men killed or mortally wounded, 1 officer and 113 enlisted men died of disease.

== Commanders ==
- Colonel Curran Pope - wounded at the battle of Perryville; died of "fever of typhoid symptoms" November 6, 1862, while recovering from his wound
- Colonel James B. Forman
- Colonel Marion Cartright Taylor
- Lieutenant Colonel Joseph R. Snider

== See also ==
- List of Kentucky Civil War Units
- Kentucky in the Civil War
