= Numbered highways in Kentucky =

- Highway markers for Interstate 75, U.S. Route 60, and Kentucky Route 1

Highway names
- Interstates: Interstate nn (I-nn)
- US Highways: U.S. Highway nn (US nn)
- State: Kentucky Route nn (KY nn)

System links
- Kentucky State Highway System; Interstate; US; State; Parkways

The Kentucky Revised Statute 177.020(1) provides that the Department of Highways, a part of the Kentucky Transportation Cabinet, is responsible for the establishment and classification of a State Primary Road System which includes the state primary routes, interstate highways, parkways and toll roads, state secondary routes, rural secondary routes and supplemental roads. These routes are listed below.

== History ==
Kentucky began a numbered route system in the 1920s. Originally numbered so that odd numbers ran from north to south, increasing to the west and even numbers ran east to west, increasing to the south, this pattern was only followed for KY 1 through KY 100. Routes numbered KY 101 and higher are in sequential order as designated by the Department of Highways.

An exception to the pattern for highways numbered 1 through 100 is New Circle Road, a circular bypass around Lexington that is also numbered as KY 4. KY 4 was previously located elsewhere.

== List of routes ==
Interstate Highways: A list of interstate highways within Kentucky.
U.S. Highways: A list of U.S. highways within Kentucky.
State Highways: A list of all state highways within Kentucky.
Parkways and named roads: A list of parkways and named roads within Kentucky.
City specific

=== City specific ===
These are comprehensive lists of city-controlled and state maintained routes.

- Roads of Ashland, Kentucky
- Roads of Lexington, Kentucky
- Roads of Louisville, Kentucky
- Roads of Nicholasville, Kentucky
