= 41st Kentucky Infantry Regiment =

- Active: 1862
- Country: United States
- Allegiance: Union
- Branch: Infantry
- Size: Regiment
- Engagements: American Civil War

The 41st Kentucky Infantry Regiment was an infantry regiment from Kentucky that served in the Union Army for thirty-days, during the American Civil War.

== Service ==
The 41st Kentucky Regiment was organized and mustered in at Covington, Kentucky. The duration of the regiment's service was thirty-days to coincide with General Bragg's invasion of Kentucky, and was disbanded at the expiration of its term of service.

In January 1888, members of the 41st claimed they had never been mustered out of the U.S. service and were therefore entitled to pay up to 1888 and proposed to make an application. If ruled valid, each member would have been entitled to $3,500.

== Bibliography ==
- Unknown. (2006). Civil War Regiments from Kentucky and Tennessee. eBookOnDisk.com Pensacola, Florida. ISBN 1-9321-5739-5.
