= 42nd Kentucky Infantry Regiment =

- Active: 1862
- Country: United States
- Allegiance: Union
- Branch: Infantry
- Size: Regiment
- Engagements: American Civil War

The 42nd Kentucky Infantry Regiment was an infantry regiment from Kentucky that served in the Union Army for thirty days, during the American Civil War.

== Service ==
The 42nd Kentucky Regiment was organized and mustered in at Newport, Kentucky. The duration of the regiment's service was thirty-days to coincide with General Bragg's invasion of Kentucky, and was disbanded at the expiration of its term of service.

== Bibliography ==
- Unknown. (2006). Civil War Regiments from Kentucky and Tennessee. eBookOnDisk.com Pensacola, Florida. ISBN 1-9321-5739-5.
