= Caudill's Army =

Caudill's Army was the name of a Confederate force from South Eastern Kentucky during the American Civil War that included the 10th Kentucky Mounted Rifles (designated the 13th Kentucky Cavalry in March 1865) commanded by Colonel Benjamin E. Caudill. An element of the Army of Tennessee and which served at times under General John Hunt Morgan's command. The force was active in the battle of Leatherwood and the Battle of Marion.

== See also ==
- List of Kentucky Civil War Confederate units

== Sources ==
- The battle of Leatherwood
- The battle of Marion
