= Second Battle of Saltville =

1864 battle of the American Civil War

Coordinates: 36.8646°N 81.7674°W

- Part of American Civil War
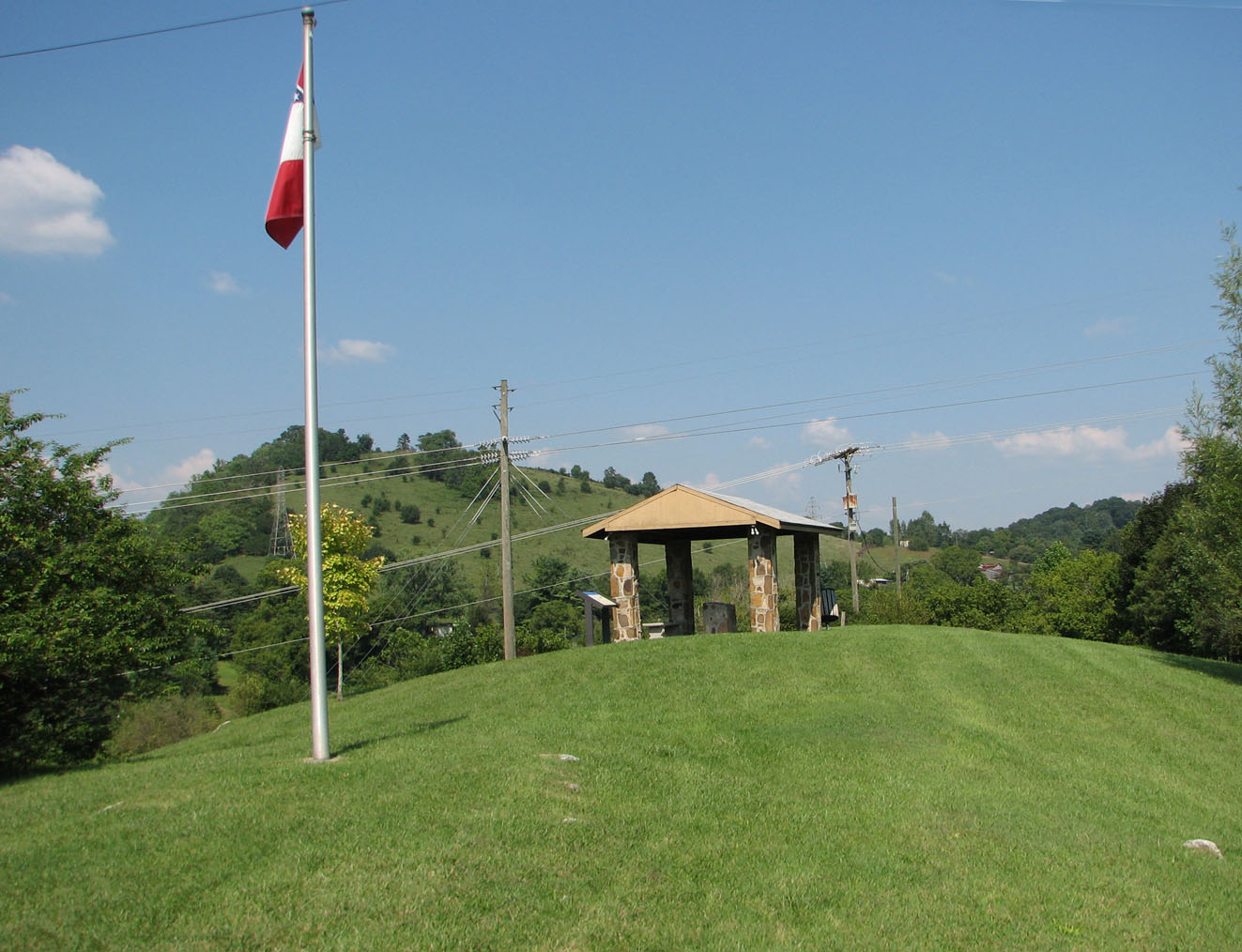
- View of part of the Saltville battlefield
Date	December 20–21, 1864
Location	Saltville, Virginia
Result	Union victory

Belligerents
United States (Union)	(Confederate States of America) CSA (Confederacy)

Commanders and leaders
George Stoneman	John C. Breckinridge

Strength
4,500	2,800

Casualties and losses
Unknown	Unknown

The Second Battle of Saltville (December 20–21, 1864), was fought near the town of Saltville, Virginia, during the American Civil War. The battle was a Union victory, and marked the end of a Union excursion known as Stoneman's 1864 raid or Stoneman's raid into Southwest Virginia. The Union objective at Saltville was to destroy a salt works that produced over half of the salt used by the Confederacy to preserve meat—including that used to supply the Army of Northern Virginia.

After the defeat of Brevet Major General Stephen G. Burbridge's expedition against Saltville (First Battle of Saltville) earlier in the year, Union Major General George Stoneman reassembled a force to again try to destroy the saltworks there. Stoneman's force included Burbridge's Division and a brigade under Brigadier General Alvan C. Gillem. Starting in Tennessee and moving to Southwestern Virginia, Stoneman defeated a Confederate force in Virginia's Battle of Marion on the December 17–18. In that battle, Union forces drove away a Confederate force commanded by Major General John C. Breckinridge.

After the action at Marion, Stoneman's force advanced to Saltville. Breckinridge was not present, but he had 500 men at Saltville under the command of Colonel Robert Preston. Union Brigadier General Gillem led the Union advance and attacked first. Burbridge joined the fight shortly afterwards, and the two Federal columns overwhelmed the town's defenses. Colonel Preston ordered a retreat, and Stoneman's troops entered the town and severely damanged the saltworks, accomplishing the objective of the Union raid. After the fight, Union troops returned to Kentucky and Tennessee while suffering losses from severe cold and harassment by a brigade commanded by Brigadier General Basil W. Duke.

== Battlefield preservation ==
The Civil War Trust (a division of the American Battlefield Trust) and its partners have acquired and preserved 107 acres (0.43 km^{2}) of the Saltville battlefields.

== Gallery ==
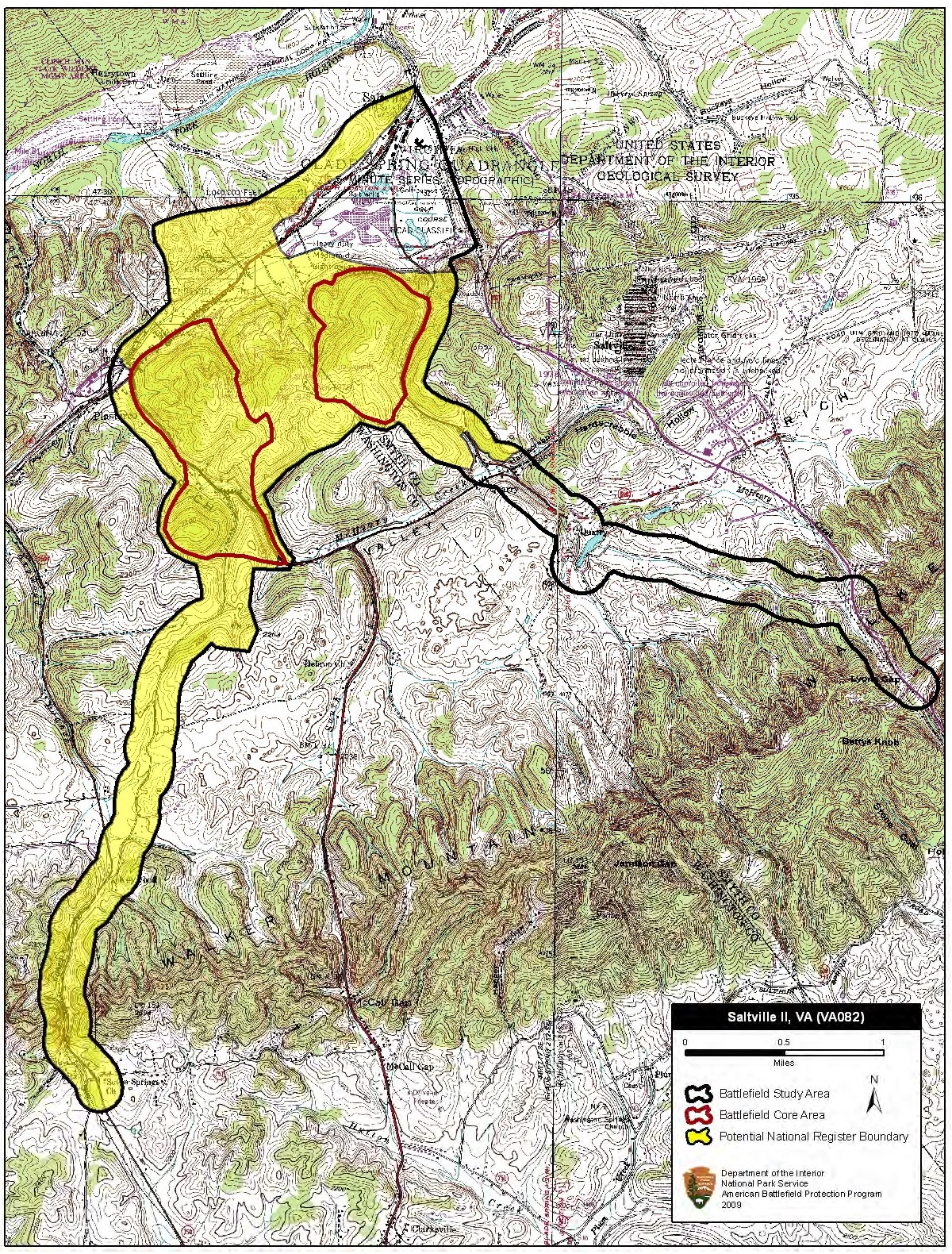
Map of battlefield core and study areas by the American Battlefield Protection Program.

== See also ==
- Saltville Battlefields Historic District
- Salt in the American Civil War

== Notes ==
=== References ===
- Asher, Brad (2021). The Most Hated Man in Kentucky - The Lost Cause and the Legacy of Union General Stephen Burbridge. Lexington, Kentucky: University Press of Kentucky. ISBN 978-0-81318-138-7. OCLC 1250630280.
- Breckinridge, John C. (1902). "Report of Maj. Gen. John C. Breckinridge, C.S. Army....". In Ainsworth, Fred C.; Kirkley, Joseph W. (eds.). The War of the Rebellion: a Compilation of the Official Records of the Union and Confederate Armies Additions and Corrections to Series I Volume XLV. Washington, DC: Government Printing Office. pp. 824–827. OCLC 318422190.
- Burbridge, Stephen G. (1902). "Reports of Bvt. Maj. Gen. Stephen G. Burbridge, U.S. Army". In Ainsworth, Fred C.; Kirkley, Joseph W. (eds.). The War of the Rebellion: a Compilation of the Official Records of the Union and Confederate Armies Additions and Corrections to Series I Volume XLV. Washington, DC: Government Printing Office. pp. 815–818. OCLC 318422190.
- Dyer, Frederick H. (1908). A Compendium of the War of the Rebellion. Des Moines, Iowa: Dyer Pub. Co. OCLC 1028851810.
- Gillem, Alvan C. (1902). "Report of Brig. Gen. Alvan C. Gillem, U.S. Army". In Ainsworth, Fred C.; Kirkley, Joseph W. (eds.). The War of the Rebellion: a Compilation of the Official Records of the Union and Confederate Armies Additions and Corrections to Series I Volume XLV. Washington, DC: Government Printing Office. pp. 819–824. OCLC 318422190.
- Matthews, Gary Robert (2005). Basil Wilson Duke, CSA: The Right Man in the Right Place. Lexington, Kentucky: University Press of Kentucky. ISBN 978-0-81317-177-7. OCLC 65377684.
- Stoneman, George (1902). "Reports of Maj. Gen. George Stoneman, U.S. Army, commanding". In Ainsworth, Fred C.; Kirkley, Joseph W. (eds.). The War of the Rebellion: a Compilation of the Official Records of the Union and Confederate Armies Additions and Corrections to Series I Volume XLV. Washington, DC: Government Printing Office. pp. 807–815. OCLC 318422190.
- Unknown (1892). "Abstract from return of the forces in the Department of Western Virginia and East Tennessee, Maj. Gen. John C. Breckinridge commanding, for November 10, 1864; headquarters Wytheville Va.". In Davis, George B.; Perry, Leslie J.; Kirkley, Joseph W. (eds.). The War of the Rebellion: a Compilation of the Official Records of the Union and Confederate Armies Part III Correspondence Series I Volume XXXIX. Washington, DC: Government Printing Office. p. 907. OCLC 318422190.
- Whisonant, Richard C. (May 1996). "Geology and the Civil War in Southwestern Virginia: The Wythe County Lead Mines" (PDF). Virginia Minerals. 42 (2). Charlottesville, Virginia: Commonwealth of Virginia, Department of Mines, Minerals, and Energy: 13–19. Archived from the original on August 8, 2017.
- Whisonant, Richard C. (November 1997). "Geology and the Civil War in Southwestern Virginia: Union Raiders in the New River Valley, May 1864" (PDF). Virginia Minerals. 43 (4). Charlottesville, Virginia: Commonwealth of Virginia, Department of Mines, Minerals, and Energy: 29–39. Archived from the original on November 16, 2021.
- Whisonant, Robert C. (2015). Arming the Confederacy: How Virginia's Minerals Forged the Rebel War Machine. Cham, Switzerland: Springer International Publishing. ISBN 978-3-319-14508-2. OCLC 903929889.
