= XXIII Corps (Union army) =

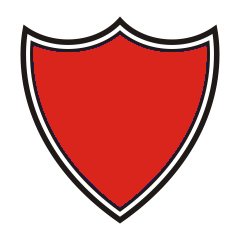
- XXIII Corps badge
- Active: 1863–1865
- Country: United States of America
- Branch: Union Army
- Type: Army Corps
- Size: Corps
- Part of: Army of the Ohio
- Engagements: American Civil War

Commanders
- Notable commanders: John M. Schofield

Insignia
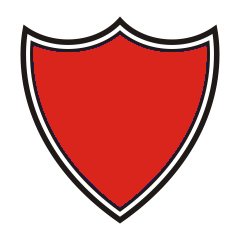
- 1st Division

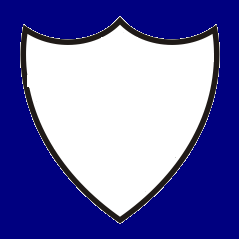
- 2nd Division

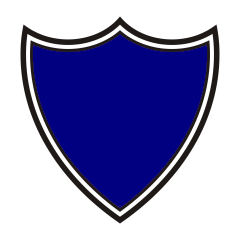
- 3rd Division

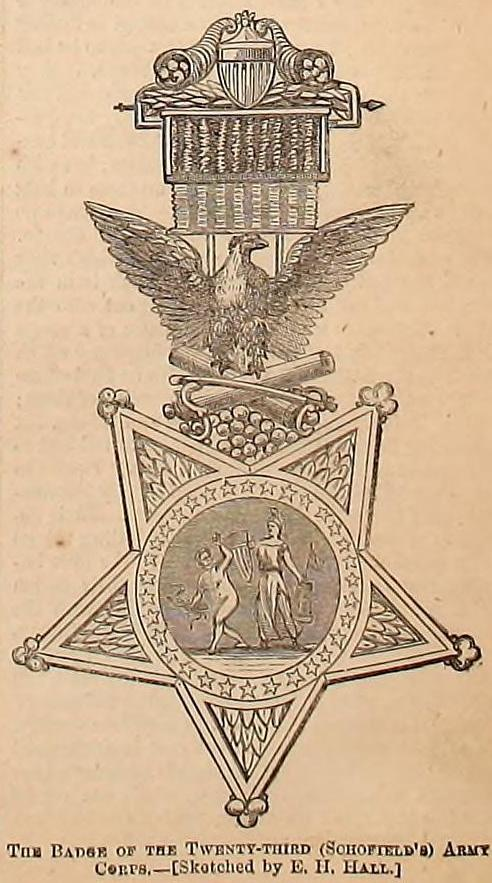
Badge of the XXIII Corps, 1865

XXIII Corps was a corps of the Union Army during the American Civil War. It served in the Western Theater as part of the Army of the Ohio.

The corps was organized in April 1863 by order of the departmental commander, Ambrose E. Burnside. Along with Burnside's old IX Corps, which had been sent west with him after Fredericksburg, it was to maintain a primarily defensive position in Eastern Tennessee and Kentucky. It originally consisted of two divisions under the overall command of General George L. Hartsuff.

The corps played a major role during the Knoxville Campaign, its first major action, distinguishing itself at the battles of Campbell's Station and Knoxville, and also took part in some minor actions in early 1864. During this time it was commanded by Maj. Gen. Mahlon D. Manson.

The Army of the Ohio joined William T. Sherman for the Atlanta campaign that spring. IX Corps was detached and sent back to rejoin the Army of the Potomac, so the "army" consisted entirely of XXIII Corps, now commanded by John M. Schofield. It served ably if unspectacularly throughout the campaign.

In the fall of 1864, it was sent north to counter John B. Hood's Franklin-Nashville Campaign, and it saw heavy action at the Battle of Franklin, though it was held in reserve at Nashville.

After this campaign, the corps was sent east to serve in the Department of the South; it took part in the capture of Fort Fisher and the seizure of Wilmington, North Carolina (the last open port of the South). During this time it was commanded by Maj. Gen. Jacob D. Cox. The corps ultimately joined Sherman's army in the Carolinas campaign, and was disbanded in August 1865.

== Command history ==
George L. Hartsuff	May 28, 1863 – September 24, 1863
Mahlon D. Manson	September 24, 1863 – December 20, 1863
Jacob D. Cox	December 20, 1863 – February 10, 1864
George Stoneman	February 10, 1864 – April 4, 1864
Jacob D. Cox	April 4, 1864 – April 9, 1864
John Schofield*	April 9, 1864 – March 31, 1865
Jacob D. Cox	March 31, 1865 – June 17, 1865
Thomas H. Ruger	June 17, 1865 – June 27, 1865
Samuel P. Carter	June 27, 1865 – August 1, 1865

* Cox commanded briefly May 26–28, 1864 and September 14 – October 22, 1864
