= Department of the Ohio =

Administrative military district created by the United States War Department

The Department of the Ohio was an administrative military district created by the United States War Department early in the American Civil War to administer the troops in the Northern states near the Ohio River.

== 1st Department 1861–1862 ==
General Orders No. 14, issued by the Adjutant General's Office in Washington, D.C., on May 3, 1861, combined all Federal troops in the states of Ohio, Indiana, and Illinois in a new military department called the Department of the Ohio, with headquarters in Cincinnati, Ohio. Maj. Gen. George B. McClellan was designated as its first commander. McClellan led efforts in the spring and early summer of 1861 to occupy the area of western Virginia that wanted to remain in the Union. His forces defeated two small Confederate armies and paved the way for the region to later become the state of West Virginia.

After McClellan was reassigned to command the Army of the Potomac, Brig. Gen. Ormsby M. Mitchel commanded the Department of the Ohio from September to November 1861. Under his directive, troops pushed southward towards Huntsville, Alabama, from Chattanooga, Tennessee, but were turned away. Then, General Orders No. 97 commanded Maj. Gen. Don Carlos Buell to assume command of the department. All the forces of the department were then organized into the Army of the Ohio with Buell in command. The Department of the Ohio was dissolved on March 11, 1862, when it was merged into the Department of the Mississippi and the Department of the Mountains.

== 2nd Department 1862–1865 ==
The Department of the Ohio was recreated on August 19, 1862, and consisted of the states of Ohio, Michigan, Indiana, Illinois, Wisconsin, and the part of Kentucky east of the Tennessee River. Maj. Gen. Horatio G. Wright was assigned to command the reconstituted department. In September, western Virginia was added to the department, along with all Federal troops in the region. On March 25, 1863, after the Senate refused to confirm Wright's promotion to major general, Maj. Gen. Ambrose Burnside assumed command of the Department of the Ohio. Wright, after briefly occupying a subordinate command in Louisville, Kentucky, transferred in May 1863 to the Army of the Potomac to command the 1st Division of VI Corps. Burnside consolidated all the forces of the department and created the XXIII Corps, which was also named the Army of the Ohio, with himself in command. Elements of the new Army of the Ohio helped repel Morgan's Raid, although the entire army rarely functioned as a single unit during this campaign. On October 16, 1863, the Department of the Ohio (along with the Department of the Tennessee and the Department of the Cumberland) became part of the Military Division of the Mississippi, under the overall command of Maj. Gen. Ulysses S. Grant.

Due to illness, Burnside asked to be relieved of command after the Battle of Fort Sanders and was replaced by Maj. Gen. John G. Foster on December 9. On February 9, 1864, Maj. Gen. John M. Schofield assumed command of the Department of the Ohio. For much of the remainder of the war, the department was synonymous with the Army of the Ohio.
