= Battle of Marion =

Action of the American Civil War

- Part of the American Civil War
- Smyth County in Virginia
Date	December 17–18, 1864
Location	Marion, Virginia 36°49′58.2″N 81°31′12.1″W
Result	Union victory

Belligerents
United States (Union)	(Confederate States of America) CSA (Confederacy)

Commanders and leaders
George Stoneman: Stephen G. Burbridge; Alvan C. Gillem	John C. Breckinridge

Units involved
Burbridge's Division*; Gillem's Brigade*	Giltner's Brigade; Cosby's Cavalry; Duke's Cavalry; Witcher's Battalion

Strength
5,500 (~3,100 engaged)	~1,000

Casualties and losses
76: 18 killed; 58 wounded; unknown missing	unknown
- * Stoneman's total force was about 5,500, but the total engaged at Marion was closer to 3,100. Gillem's brigade of 1,500 was at the battlefield but did not fight. Burbridge had one brigade of 600, plus one regiment of 300, absent from the battlefield.

The Battle of Marion was an action that occurred on December 17–18, 1864, during the American Civil War. The fight took place in southwestern Virginia's Smyth County near Marion. A Union Army under the command of Major General George Stoneman defeated a smaller Confederate Army under the command of Major General John C. Breckinridge. The fight was mostly a stalemate for about 36 hours as the Confederate troops held better field position. After realizing that his force was nearly surrounded and low on ammunition, Breckinridge stealthily withdrew his troops during the night, escaping to the south before heading east.

The fight at Marion was one of several conflicts that occurred during a Union expedition known as Stoneman's 1864 raid. The objective of the raid was the destruction of Confederate economic and transport infrastructure—salt mines, lead mines, and the Virginia and Tennessee Railroad. All three were important to the Confederacy's war effort.

After the victory at Marion, Union forces advanced to the salt mines and defeated a small militia in the Second Battle of Saltville. The lead mines and railroad infrastructure had already been ravaged. The salt mines were damaged, and then Stoneman's force split to begin a difficult return trip to Union strongholds in Tennessee and Kentucky.

== Background ==
=== Salt and lead ===
During the 1860s, salt was necessary to preserve meat—especially beef. At the beginning of the American Civil War, the Confederate states had only five major producers of salt. Three of those sources were lost to Union Army forces early in the war. Of the two remaining salt works after 1863, Virginia's Saltville salt mine produced as much as two thirds of the salt used by the Confederate states. Saltville was located on the west side of Smyth County, close to the border with Washington County. The remaining major salt works was in Alabama—too far away to supply salt for the Confederacy's largest army—General Robert E. Lee's Army of Northern Virginia.

Austinville, in Wythe County, was the home of the Wytheville Union Lead Mine Company. Despite having "Union" in its name, the company mined lead that was used to produce bullets for the Confederate Army. Almost all of the domestically–produced lead used by the Confederacy came from this mine, and it produced at least one third of the lead used by the Confederate Army. In addition to lead and salt, southwestern Virginia was also a producer of iron, niter (the main ingredient for gunpowder), and coal. All of these minerals were needed for the war effort. Wytheville was the headquarters of the Confederate Department of Western Virginia and East Tennessee. It was near the lead mines and railroad, and was a location for supplies used by the Confederate Army. Marion, the county seat of Smyth County, is located between the salt and lead mines. (Note: Marion is located about 20 miles (32 km) from Saltville using contemporary highways. It is about 44 miles (71 km) from Austinville, Virginia.)

=== The railroad ===
The Virginia and Tennessee Railroad allowed the transport of material necessary for the Confederate war effort. It helped connect southwestern Virginia with the Confederate capital at Richmond, and its western junction at Bristol near the Virginia–Tennessee border enabled connection to the western Confederacy. (Note: The Virginia and Tennessee Railroad connected Lynchburg, Virginia, to Bristol at the Virginia–Tennessee border. Additional railroads could be used from Lynchburg to move east to the Confederate capitol in Richmond, Virginia. From Bristol, railroads connected to cities further west such as Knoxville, Chattanooga, Memphis, and Corinth.)

In addition to transporting minerals such as salt and lead both east and west, the railroad moved food east. The railroad was also used to transport Confederate troops. During March 1864, Lieutenant General Ulysses S. Grant became commander of all Union armies. As part of his strategy to attack Robert E. Lee's Army of Northern Virginia from multiple fronts, Grant wanted to damage Lee's support system from western Virginia.

=== Previous attacks on the railroad and mines ===
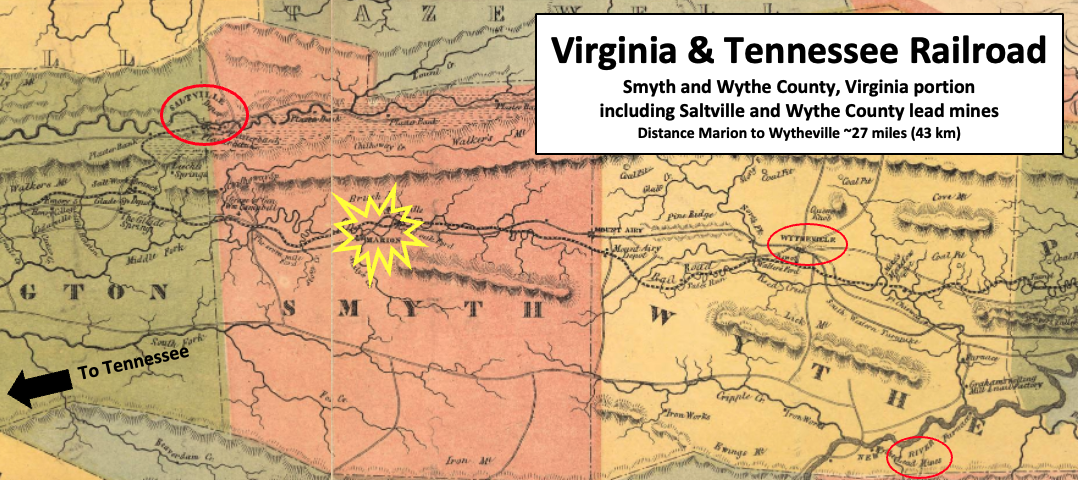
The V&T RR in southwestern Virginia near Tennessee

The Virginia and Tennessee Railroad, and the mines it served, had been attacked by the Union Army with limited success. In 1863, Colonel John Toland led a raid that aborted an attempt to attack Saltville and ended with a fight at Wytheville (where he was killed) as part of an attempt to damage the lead mines and railroad line. The excursion, known as the Wytheville Raid or Toland's Raid, caused only a small amount of damage to the railroad and the lead mines were not attacked. In November 1863, Brigadier General William W. Averell won the Battle of Droop Mountain, but decided to not proceed to the railroad.

In late April 1864 Brigadier General George Crook began an expedition to attack the railroad and its bridge over the New River while Brigadier General Averell attacked the salt mines at Saltville. Averell decided not to attack Saltville because it was too well defended, and was prevented from attacking the Austinville lead mines in the Battle of Cove Mountain that occurred at Crockett's Cove near Wytheville. Crook defeated the Confederates in the Battle of Cloyd's Mountain. On the next day, he burned the railroad bridge over the New River. The bridge was rebuilt within five weeks, and the wood used for the rebuild was fire-resistant. In October 1864, a Union force led by Brigadier General Stephen G. Burbridge was defeated at the Saltville saltworks in the First Battle of Saltville. After the battle, Confederate soldiers executed some of the wounded soldiers from the 5th United States Colored Cavalry Regiment, and this became known as the Saltville Massacre.

== Opposing forces ==
=== Union Forces ===
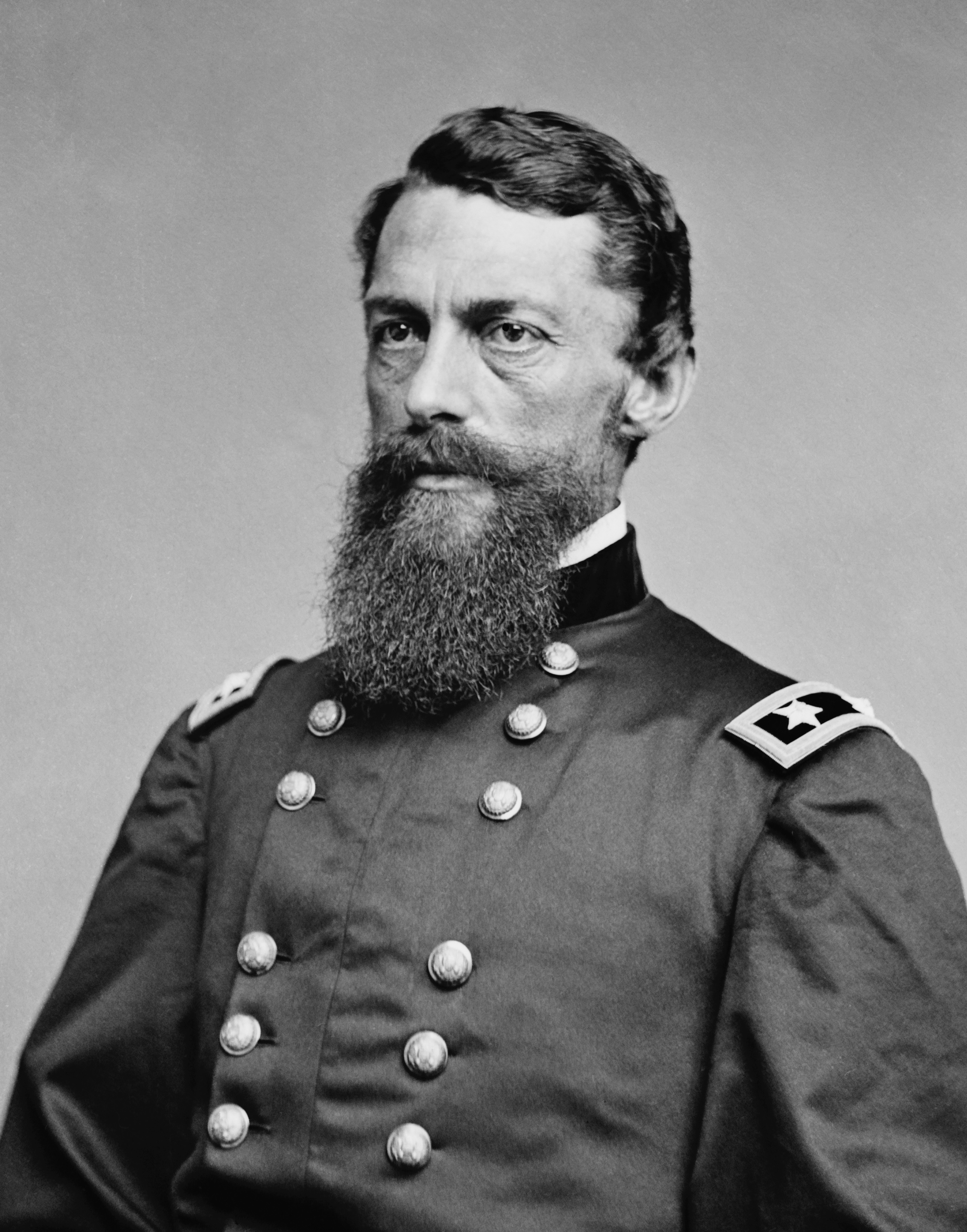
George Stoneman

Major General George Stoneman was second-in-command in the Department of the Ohio, and based in Knoxville, Tennessee in late 1864. For his excursion into southwestern Virginia, his command consisted of two forces: one from Kentucky and one from Tennessee. (Note: The Union regiments listed below are those listed in Frederick H. Dyer's A Compendium of the War of the Rebellion.)

Governor's Guards: This Tennessee brigade was commanded by Brigadier General Alvan C. Gillem, and totaled to 1,500 mounted soldiers that were chosen for the expedition. (Note: Major General George Stoneman called Gillem's force "a portion of a Tennessee cavalry brigade".) The brigade consisted of the 8th Tennessee Cavalry Regiment (Union), the 9th Tennessee Cavalry Regiment (Union), and the 13th Tennessee Cavalry Regiment (Union). Gillem's brigade did not engage at Marion, but its positioning at the battlefield at the end of the second day was one of the factors that caused the Confederate force to withdraw.

Burbridge's Division: Brevet Major General Stephen G. Burbridge was the commander of this division. (Note: Burbridge calls his command "my mounted force" in his December 28 report, and mentions multiple brigades that are part of the force. In Brigadier General Gillem's December 30 report, he mentions "General Burbridge's division" on two pages.) This mounted force was organized into brigades and consisted of 4,000 soldiers according to Burbridge's report. (Note: Many sources have accepted Burbridge's report of a force of 4,000, resulting in a combined (with Gillem) Union force of 5,500. However, Burbridge is known to have exaggerated numbers in his favor. Stoneman reported the size of Burbridge's force as 4,200.)

- Burbridge's First Brigade was commanded by Colonel Simeon B. Brown of the 11th Michigan Cavalry. It consisted of the 12th Ohio Cavalry, the 11th Michigan Cavalry, the 11th Kentucky Cavalry, and the 12th Kentucky Cavalry. The 12th Ohio and 11th Michigan were considered veteran regiments, and both were using Spencer carbines. Three of the regiments (the 12th Kentucky did not) had experience fighting in the First Battle of Saltville that occurred on October 2, 1864. At least one company from the 12th Kentucky was armed with Henry repeating rifles. The 12th Kentucky was detached for a mission of damaging railroad infrastructure, and passed through Marion a day or two before the battle, but it is unlikely that it fought at the Battle of Marion.
- Burbridge's Second Brigade was commanded by Colonel Harvey M. Buckley of the 54th Kentucky Mounted Infantry. Regiments in this brigade included the 30th Kentucky Mounted Infantry Regiment, the 53rd Kentucky Mounted Infantry Regiment, and the 54th Kentucky Mounted Infantry. Buckley's brigade did not engage at Marion, but its positioning approximately six miles (9.7 km) behind the Confederate force was one of the factors that caused the Confederates to withdraw. One source says this brigade had only 600 soldiers.
- Burbridge's Third Brigade was commanded by Colonel James F. Wade of the 6th United States Colored Cavalry. The brigade consisted of the 45th Kentucky Mounted Infantry Regiment (Union), the 5th United States Colored Cavalry Regiment, and the 6th United States Colored Cavalry Regiment. All three regiments had experience fighting at Saltville on October 2, but the two Colored Cavalry regiments had been organized only a few months earlier. Although not listed in Dyer's Compendium as present at the battle, other sources (including the regiment history in Dyer's Compendium) have indicated that the 39th Kentucky Mounted Infantry Regiment was present. (Note: A "37th Kentucky Infantry" is mentioned by Stephens as being part of Wade's brigade and fighting at Saltville after the Battle of Marion. Dyer's Compendium does not mention the regiment as present at Marion or Saltville in December, and the Compendium's regimental history mentions it as present on the September 20-October 17 expedition to Saltville but not the December expedition.)

Other units: Battery "E" Kentucky Light Artillery (Union) and the 10th Michigan Cavalry Regiment were also part of the Union force. The 10th Michigan was a detachment of 50 soldiers, led by Captain James B. Roberts, that was Major General Stoneman's escort. (Note: Some sources mention Ohio Heavy Artillery as involved in the expedition. Starr says that Gillem's brigade had "two regiments of Ohio heavy artillery, serving as infantry". Stoneman's report mentions "two regiments of Ohio heavy artillery" meeting at Bean's Station. A history of the 12th Ohio Cavalry also mentions the meet at Bean's Station, describing the "First and Second Regiments of Ohio Heavy Artillery under General Ammen...to assist in the campaign." Dyer does not list either regiment for the Battle of Marion. The National Park Service says the 1st was foraging on "Expeditions on the French Broad and Chucky River in East Tennessee and North Carolina" during December 1864. It also says the 2nd was on "Ammon's Expedition to Bean's Station December 7-29".)

=== Confederate forces ===
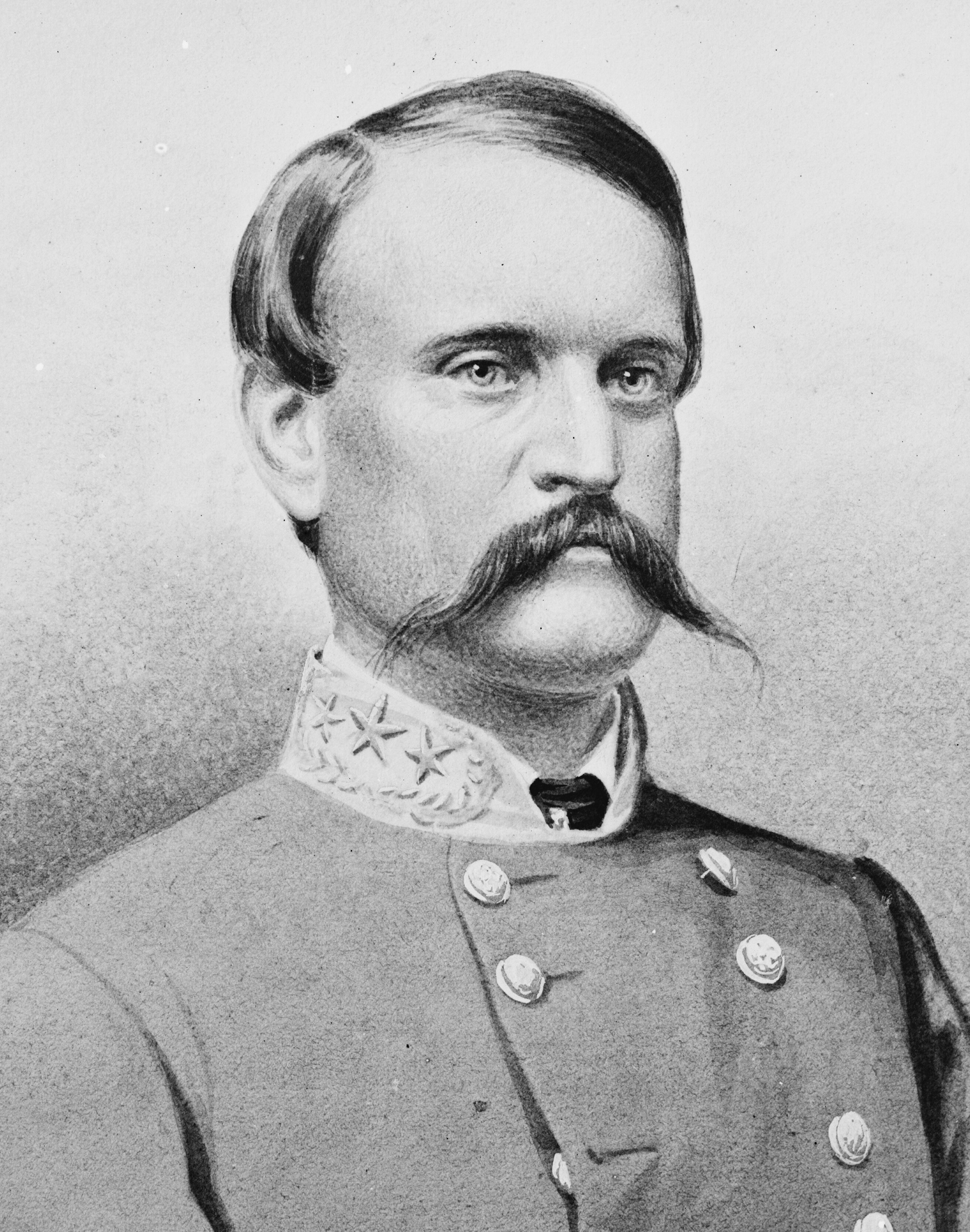
John C. Breckinridge

The Confederate forces were under the command of Major General John C. Breckinridge, who was the commander of the Department of Western Virginia and East Tennessee. Breckinridge's force totaled to about 1600 soldiers excluding Vaughn's brigade. For the Battle of Marion, the militia portion of the force remained in Saltville, giving Breckinridge a force of approximately 1,000. (Note: For November 10, 1864, Duke's Brigade had 440 effectives present. Witcher's command had 584 effectives, and a combination of Cosby's and Giltner's commands had 250 effectives. Duke's Brigade was defeated on December 13, 1864, and lost 84 soldiers taken prisoner along with its wagon train.)

- Cosby - This cavalry brigade was commanded by Brigadier General George B. Cosby. It was described as "a small brigade from the Valley of Virginia."
- Duke - This cavalry brigade was commanded by Brigadier General Basil W. Duke. It was the remnants of the famed Morgan's Cavalry that was commanded by John Hunt Morgan until his death on September 4, 1864. By the time Duke's cavalry fought at Marion, it had about 220 effectives.
- Giltner - Colonel Henry L. Giltner, of the 4th Kentucky Cavalry Regiment (Confederate) commanded this brigade.
- Witcher - Lieutenant Colonel Vincent A. Witcher, of the 34th Virginia Cavalry Battalion, commanded the battalion. This battalion consisted of about 300 soldiers.
- Artillery - Breckinridge had artillery at Saltville and Marion. His report mentions "Barr's artillery company, a few men of Kain's artillery, and some pieces in position" at Saltville. He also said he had Burroughs' battery at Marion, which had four artillery pieces.

Colonel Robert T. Preston commanded 400 to 500 reservists and militia members. They were stationed at Saltville, and did not engage at Marion. Brigadier General John C. Vaughn commanded a cavalry brigade that was in the area and providing intelligence to Breckinridge. It fought Stoneman's force mostly in Smyth and Wythe counties, but did not engage at Marion on December 17 and 18. Included in Vaughn's brigade was the 43rd Tennessee Mounted Infantry Regiment commanded by Colonel James W. Gillespie.

== Expedition begins ==
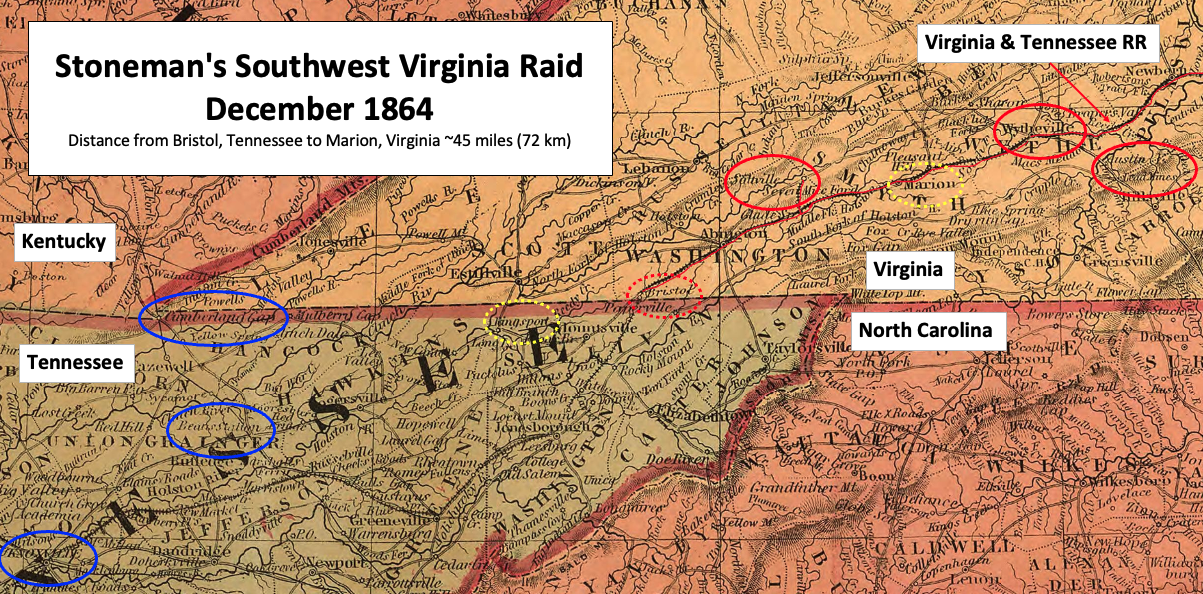
Stoneman would raid Virginia's the salt mines, and railroad that served them, using a Tennessee starting point.

=== Organization ===
Major General Stoneman began organizing a raid into southwestern Virginia during November 1864. The portion of his plan that was approved had the objective of destroying a Confederate salt works in Saltville, Virginia—and the Virginia and Tennessee Railroad that served it. An additional target of interest was the lead mine in Austinville.

Union Major General Burbridge brought a division of approximately 4,000 soldiers from Kentucky to combine forces with Stoneman in Tennessee. Stoneman had 1,500 Tennessee troops led by Brigadier General Alvan C. Gillem. By December 1 Confederate Major General Breckinridge was made aware that Burbridge had moved through the Cumberland Gap and was heading toward Bean Station, Tennessee. Breckinridge had cavalry units positioned in eastern Tennessee between Bean Station and Virginia, and they were commanded by Brigadier General John C. Vaughn and Brigadier General Basil Duke.

=== Gillem fights Duke ===
Stoneman and Gillem left Knoxville on December 10, and met Burbridge on December 11 at Bean's Station. The combined force of about 5,700 soldiers began moving east on the morning of December 12, with Gillem leading the advance followed by Burbridge with his three brigades. On December 12 and 13, Gillem (with the support of two regiments from Burbridge's command) fought Duke's Confederate brigade of about 800 soldiers near Kingsport, Tennessee. Duke's Brigade had over 100 casualties and lost its wagon train with food and ammunition. Portions of Duke's Brigade scattered and escaped to the woods. Brigadier General Basil Duke, who was on leave at Bristol, left town to find and reorganize the remaining soldiers from his brigade. Duke's soldiers regrouped in Saltville. (Note: Duke's brigade was the remnants of a cavalry commanded by John Hunt Morgan. Gillem reported that he captured Duke's wagon train (including food and ammunition). He also reported that 18 Confederate soldiers were killed and 84 captured. One of the prisoners was Colonel Richard C. Morgan, brother of John Hunt Morgan, who was in command of the brigade at the time.) By now, Breckenridge was aware of the threat of the Union force moving from Tennessee to Virginia, and he began assembling forces.

=== Bristol and Abingdon ===
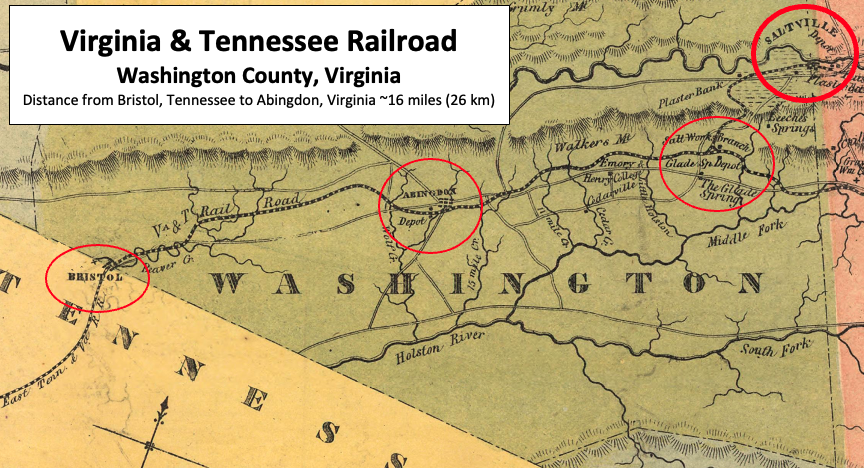
The Abingdon railroad depot was located between Bristol and Glade Springs, and the Glade Springs branch line led to Saltville.

On the evening of December 13, Burbridge's division entered Bristol against little opposition. His force began destroying railroad infrastructure and storage sheds. They also took over the telegraph office, and were able to monitor Breckinridge's communications for several hours—learning Confederate positions and force sizes.

Breckenridge ordered Vaughn to proceed to Bristol; and he had already ordered Brigadier General John Echols to call in the reserves. Witcher was ordered to move his brigade to Saltville, and the brigades commanded by Cosby and Giltner were ordered to Abingdon. (Note: Abingdon was a railroad stop in Washington County, Virginia. It was located between Bristol and Glade Springs. A branch line from Glade Springs led to Saltville.)

Vaughn was about 12 miles (19 km) from Bristol when he realized he could not get there because of Burbridge's large force. He proceeded toward Abingdon, hoping to get there before the Union soldiers and protect the salt works. Burbridge, moving on a road parallel to Vaughn, reached an intersection two miles (3.2 km) west of Abingdon two hours before Vaughn. This time Vaughn took another road toward Wytheville. Burbridge captured Abingdon on the evening of December 14. At that time Cosby and Giltner retreated to Saltville. Stoneman arrived at Abingdon with Gillem on the morning of December 15.

=== Glade Springs and Wytheville ===
Stoneman sent the 12th Kentucky Cavalry, commanded by Major James B. Harrison, to cut the railroad line at Glade Springs. Harrison cut the line, on December 15, less than an hour after Breckinridge passed by on a train from Wytheville to Saltville. Harrison captured two trains. He also destroyed bridges, locomotives, and railcars. (Note: One source says that Harrison was able to damage all the large bridges on the way to Wytheville, and was eventually chased by Vaughn (who was being chased by Gillem). Harrison eventually swung around Wytheville and moved southwest through Rye Valley and back to Bean Station—meaning that the 12th Kentucky was not present at the Battle of Marion. On Harrison's return trip from Wytheville, he destroyed an iron works southeast of Marion near Sugar Grove.) Stoneman had a choice: attack Saltville, or continue northeast and tear up railroad infrastructure and the lead mines. Saltville now had plenty of Confederate soldiers with fortifications and artillery—and if Stoneman was not careful, he could also have Vaughn behind him. He decided to destroy as much railroad infrastructure as possible and began moving northeast toward Marion and Wytheville. A brigade made a feint toward Saltville before returning to Stoneman.

Gillem was sent northeast to pursue Vaughn. He was reinforced by regiments from Burbridge's First Brigade. (Note: Stoneman's report says Gillem was reinforced by the 11th Kentucky and 11th Michigan. The author of the history of the 12th Ohio Cavalry claims that the 12th Ohio (from Burbridge's First Brigade), with Gillem's three regiments, chased Vaughn and captured Wytheville. Gillem's report says he was joined by Colonel Brown's brigade of Burbridge's command (which includes the 12th Ohio) about one mile (1.6 km) outside of Wytheville, and he sent the 11th Kentucky to destroy rail line toward Lynchburg. Burbridge's report says his First Brigade, commanded by Brown, was sent to assist Gillem and joined after Gillem had reached Mount Airy.) Gillem began catching up with Vaughn on the morning of December 16, and drove him to Wytheville and beyond. It was thought that all of Vaughn's artillery and wagon trains, and 198 soldiers, were captured. However, Vaughn had split his command and much of the wagon train left before the fighting and escaped southward through Rye Valley near Cripple Creek. Colonel James W. Gillespie commanded the portion of Vaughn's force that did not escape south to Rye Valley. Those that were not captured eventually fled to the mountains or east to the New River. In Wytheville, ammunition, medical supplies, wagons, and artillery were destroyed. Gillem's force completed its mission, including the destruction of Breckenridge's headquarters, during the evening of December 16 and went into camp outside of Wytheville.

=== Movement to battle ===
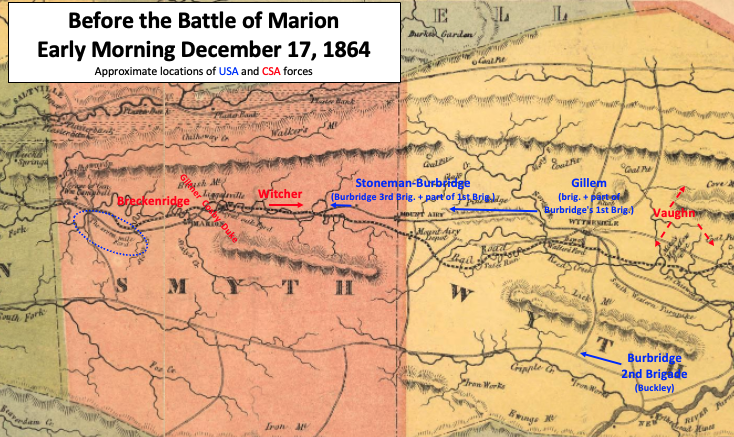
Approximate positions of USA and CSA forces

Breckinridge decided, on the evening of December 16, to leave Saltville and catch Stoneman from behind. Saltville would be left with 400 to 500 reserves commanded by Colonel Robert T. Preston. Giltner would lead Breckinridge's force, with Duke and Crosby following, toward Marion. They began moving before daylight on December 17.

Witcher, who had been sent out earlier, notified Breckinridge that Stoneman left Marion about two hours before daylight. At Mount Airy before sunrise on December 17, Stoneman sent Burbridge's Second Brigade, commanded by Colonel Harvey M. Buckley, to southern Wythe County where a significant amount of property associated with the lead mines was destroyed. After completing its mission at the lead mines, Buckley's Brigade had been ordered to move via a different (more southern) route to a point between Glade Springs and Marion called Seven Mile Ford.

Witcher's report said he caught up with the Union soldiers (Stoneman and Burbridge) around 9:30 am near Mount Airy. (Note: Mount Airy, Virginia, no longer exists. It was located between Wytheville and Marion near what is now Rural Retreat, Virginia, not far from the Virginia & Tennessee Railroad.) Beginning his trip back to Stoneman, Gillem left his camp near Wytheville around 7:00 am on December 17. On the way back, he received a message requesting assistance because of a large Confederate force at Stoneman's front. Gillem brought forward his entire command. He reported to Stoneman at about 1:00 pm near Mount Airy (between Wytheville and Marion), and was told that Burbridge had driven the Confederates back toward Marion. Gillem's brigade became the rear guard. Burbridge's report says he used the 11th Michigan to drive Witcher and his 300 riders close to Marion. (Note: A different source does not agree that the 11th Michigan was used to drive Witcher back to Marion. Instead, it says that the Confederate cavalry was 400 strong, and the Union force that pursued them was led by Colonel William Boyle and the 15th Kentucky, followed by a portion of the 12th Ohio led by Major Herrick. Another source says it was Brown's brigade that made the pursuit, meaning the 11th Michigan, 12th Ohio, and 15th Kentucky were all involved.)

== Battle ==
=== First day ===
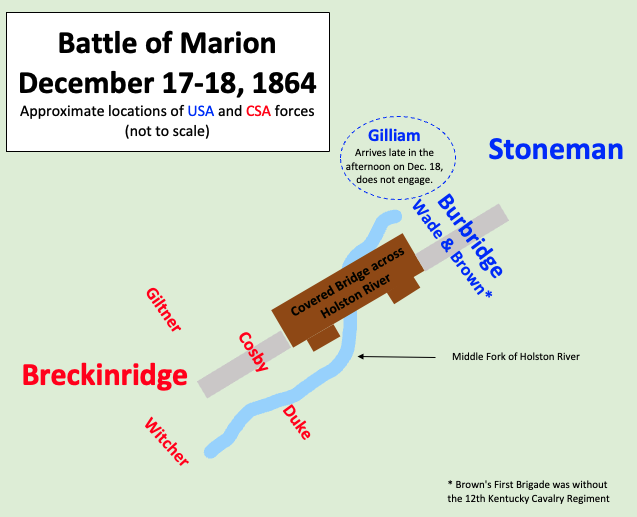
Approximate positions with a covered bridge as major divider

Late in the morning of December 17, it rained hard around Marion, adding to the mud from earlier rain and sleet. About two miles (3.2 km) east of Marion, Witcher's cavalry collided with Breckenridge's advance guard while being pursued by Union cavalry. A brief period of disorganization and confusion began, but Cosby's brigade dismounted from behind the advance guard and drove the Union cavalry back. Burbridge's soldiers began forming on a high hill overlooking the Holston River. The hill was the strongest defensive position, and Confederate leaders realized they needed to take the hill. The hill was captured, and the dismounted Confederate soldiers soon organized a thin battle line around 4:00 pm.

On the Union side, Burbridge had been repeatedly requesting more troops, causing Stoneman to assume command until the end of the engagement. Stoneman reported that Burbridge's troops were "very much disarranged, and he (Stoneman) spent "part of the night getting things straightened out." Gillem's brigade did not fight and was positioned at the rear waiting for orders. The fighting centered around a covered bridge over the middle branch of the Holston River. (Note: One source claims the waterway was Staley's Creek, a tributary of the Holsten River.) Duke held the Confederate right on a ridge, and was the only Confederate unit across the shallow river. Cosby held the center (in front of the bridge), and Giltner held the left. Union soldiers attacked a few more times. Although one Confederate source mentions a repulse with "heavy loss to the Enemy", one of Duke's biographers believes the Union attacks were simply reconnaissance missions ordered by Stoneman while he was "trying to sort out Burbridge's mess" before any real attacks. That evening, Duke ordered his soldiers to prepare breastworks. Campfires were not available because they would draw enemy fire, and the two lines of battle were less than 150 yards (140 m) apart.

=== Second day ===
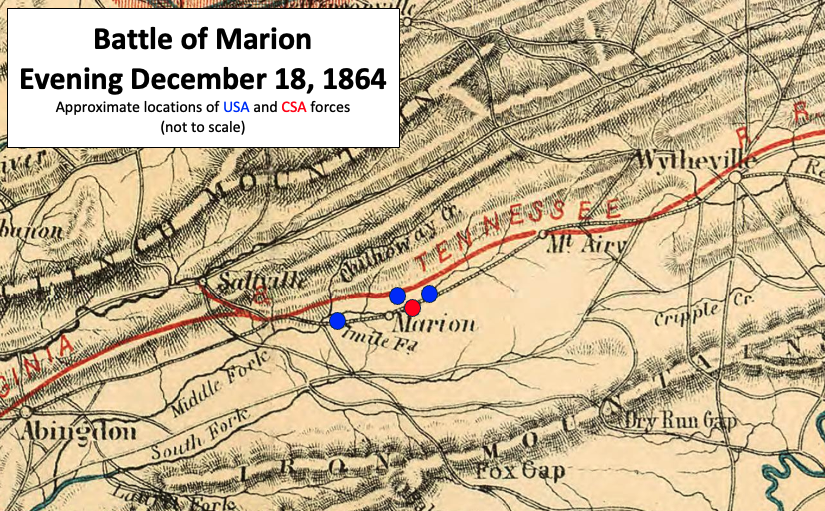
Positions on evening of day 2

By early morning of December 18, Colonel Buckley's 2nd Brigade was near Seven Mile Ford on the west side of Marion. The force numbered about 600, and it was unaware of the previous day's events near Marion. Gillem's brigade was sent to Saltville to attack the salt works, which was about 18 miles (29 km) away. It rained all day during the second day of the battle, as the soldiers fought in mud and cold December weather. Fighting would be conducted on foot, with both sides making and repulsing attacks on the Confederate right (Union left).

Stoneman did not attack immediately in the morning. The attacks for the first few hours were probes. Stoneman tested Breckinridge's line from left to right, and decided to concentrate his attack on Duke's position on the Confederate right. In the afternoon, Duke was reinforced by Witcher. Duke had an estimated 220 men on his front line before he received reinforcements from Witcher, and he successfully held off Stoneman's attacks. Before the day was over, Union Colonel William O. Boyle of the 11th Kentucky was killed leading a charge. (Note: The number soldiers at the battle was very different depending on the point of view. A Confederate soldier wrote "Breckinridge with 1000 Kentuckians against Burbridge & Stoneman with 4000". A Union soldier wrote that Stoneman "was outnumbered by a fresh and determined force under Breckenridge" and the Union force was ready to "cut its way out of the trap.")

During the late afternoon, Duke attacked Stoneman's left and briefly gained the Union rear, but the threat was averted. This caused Stoneman to remain in defensive positions for the remainder of the day. Earlier in the day, Stoneman had sent a messenger to Gillem, requesting that he return his brigade to the Marion battlefield. Gillem's brigade arrived at Breckenridge's left late in the day, and did not engage. Although Gillem did no fighting, it is the opinion of at least one author that Gillem's presence "gave Stoneman the battle".

==== Evening and withdrawal ====
By evening, both sides were experiencing shortages of ammunition and food, and both sides still held the same positions occupied in the morning. Breckinridge now had Union troops on three sides. Stoneman was at his front with nearly two of Burbridge's brigades, Gillem on the left, and Burbridge's other brigade (Buckley's) was approximately six miles (9.7 km) to the rear. In danger of being surrounded and low on ammunition, Breckinridge knew he needed to withdraw. Many of the Confederate soldiers did not know the situation, and thought they had won the battle. They were shocked at 11:00 pm when they were ordered to withdraw. The withdrawal was at Breckenridge's right flank, south over Glade Mountain.

Just before dawn on December 19, Stoneman had his soldiers mounted and ready to attack. Unable to find the enemy, the Union force advanced to downtown Marion. Burbridge's report said Breckinridge retreated toward Saltville, but Buckley's Brigade blocked Breckenridge's route and caused him to retreat "in confusion toward North Carolina". A Confederate soldier later wrote that a small portion of their force accidentally took the road toward Saltville, the wrong route, before being overtaken by a courier and returning to Marion for the southward withdrawal. Stoneman's report said Breckenridge's escaped to North Carolina, but Breckenridge remained in Virginia by first escaping south toward North Carolina, then moving northeast along the south fork of the Holston River through Virginia's Rye Valley. Breckinridge then turned north to Mount Airy.

== Aftermath and significance ==
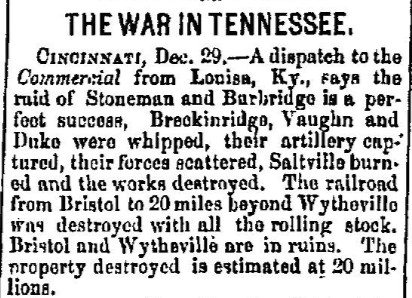
Union point of view of the excursion

The December 17–18 confrontation at Marion has been classified as an engagement (not a battle, but not a skirmish) in Frederick H. Dyer's A Compendium of the War of the Rebellion. It was the largest fight of Stoneman's December 1864 raid. Two of Burbridge's brigades, commanded by Colonel Brown and Colonel Wade, did the fighting at Marion. Brown's brigade was without the services of the 12th Kentucky Cavalry that was assigned the task of destroying railroad infrastructure. The positioning of Gillem and Burbridge's brigade commanded by Colonel Buckley, even without fighting, contributed to Breckenridge's decision to withdraw.

=== Casualties ===
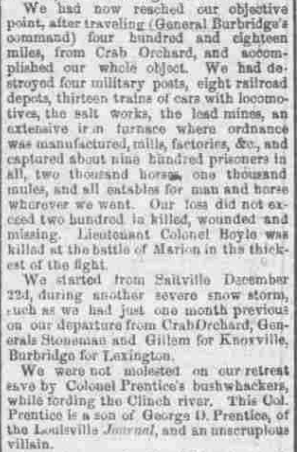
Portion of a northern newspaper article

A newspaper article said that the entire expedition's loss "did not exceed two hundred in killed, wounded and missing". Separate from the Battle of Marion and after the Second Battle of Saltville, both Union commands suffered from weather–related difficulties during the return trips to Tennessee and Kentucky that resulted in frostbite and dead horses. A newspaper listed casualties from Burbridge's command as reported by Abram H. Hunt, Assistant Surgeon of the 12th Ohio Cavalry. This list included the names of the soldiers killed or wounded during the entire expedition (Knoxville, Marion, Wytheville, Saltville, etc.). His report totals to nine killed and 49 wounded, and the wounded includes a captain in the 11th Michigan Cavalry who was mortally wounded. Brigadier General Gillem reported four killed and 20 wounded in his brigade for the entire expedition. The combined expedition count is not dramatically different from Dyer's Compendium total for Marion which is 18 killed and 58 wounded. (Note: In disagreement with the Official Record and Dyer's Compendium, authors Gary R. Matthews and Gary C. Walker stated that near the end of the fight at Marion, there were 187 dead Union soldiers at Duke's immediate front. Walker says this was an estimate by Colonel Duke, and Duke also observed that the dead were mostly colored troops. The National Park Service says the 5th U.S. Colored Cavalry had 35 enlisted men and one officer killed during the entire war. It's page on the 6th U.S. Colored Cavalry does not provide statistics on casualties.)

Confederate losses are difficult to ascertain. A newspaper report said 36 Confederate officers and 845 Confederate soldiers were captured during the entire excursion (Knoxville, Marion, Wytheville, Saltville, etc.), but did not have detail for other casualties or Marion–specific casualties. Breckenridge's January 3, 1865, report did not list casualties. He also added that most of the prisoners claimed to be taken by Stoneman's force were citizens that were later released.

=== Results ===
With Breckenridge's army driven away, Stoneman was able to attack the salt works at Saltville and burn the town. Breckinridge, after reaching Mount Airy, obtained ammunition. He sent Duke down the main road back to Marion while Breckenridge's remaining force followed. Duke discovered that Stoneman had moved on to Saltville, and this unintentionally foiled Breckenridge's maneuver. Duke, with a force of about 300, harassed Burbridge as he returned to Kentucky. Weather and dead Union horses made it too difficult for Duke to continue a pursuit, and it ended when he reached Wheeler's Ford—about 52 miles (84 km) from Saltville. The Union soldiers he captured were mostly stragglers.

Although Stoneman claimed "total destruction" of the salt works, he actually damaged about one-third of the salt kettles and did no significant damage to the wells. Other losses were the inventory of salt, machinery, and the slave labor force. Damage to the Virginia and Tennessee Railroad infrastructure was significant, but the rail line was back in operation in about two months. An ironworks near Marion was destroyed. In a letter dated March 28, 1865, a Confederate leader noted that the Wythe Lead Mines restarted production on March 22—meaning that Stoneman's expedition made the lead mines inoperable for about three months.

== Notes ==
=== References ===
- Asher, Brad (2021). The Most Hated Man in Kentucky - The Lost Cause and the Legacy of Union General Stephen Burbridge. Lexington, Kentucky: University Press of Kentucky. ISBN 978-0-81318-138-7. OCLC 1250630280.
- Breckinridge, John C. (1902). "Report of Maj. Gen. John C. Breckinridge, C.S. Army....". In Ainsworth, Fred C.; Kirkley, Joseph W. (eds.). The War of the Rebellion: a Compilation of the Official Records of the Union and Confederate Armies Additions and Corrections to Series I Volume XLV. Washington, DC: Government Printing Office. pp. 824–827. OCLC 318422190.
- Burbridge, Stephen G. (1902). "Reports of Bvt. Maj. Gen. Stephen G. Burbridge, U.S. Army". In Ainsworth, Fred C.; Kirkley, Joseph W. (eds.). The War of the Rebellion: a Compilation of the Official Records of the Union and Confederate Armies Additions and Corrections to Series I Volume XLV. Washington, DC: Government Printing Office. pp. 815–818. OCLC 318422190.
- Cosby, George B. (1902). "Reports of Brig. Gen. George B. Cosby, C.S. Army". In Ainsworth, Fred C.; Kirkley, Joseph W. (eds.). The War of the Rebellion: a Compilation of the Official Records of the Union and Confederate Armies Additions and Corrections to Series I Volume XLV. Washington, DC: Government Printing Office. p. 841. OCLC 318422190.
- Davis, William C.; Swentor, Meredith L., eds. (1999). Bluegrass Confederate - The Headquarters Diary of Edward O. Guerrant. Baton Rough, Louisiana: Louisiana State University Press.
- Davis, William C. (2010). Breckinridge: Statesman, Soldier, Symbol. Lexington, Kentucky: University Press of Kentucky. ISBN 978-0-81315-997-3. OCLC 900543965.
- Duke, Basil W. (1902). "Reports of Brig. Gen. Basil W. Duke, C.S. Army". In Ainsworth, Fred C.; Kirkley, Joseph W. (eds.). The War of the Rebellion: a Compilation of the Official Records of the Union and Confederate Armies Additions and Corrections to Series I Volume XLV. Washington, DC: Government Printing Office. pp. 836–838. OCLC 318422190.
- Dyer, Frederick H. (1908). A Compendium of the War of the Rebellion. Des Moines, Iowa: Dyer Pub. Co. OCLC 1028851810.
- Elliott, Tho. I. (1892). "Instructions letter forwarded by Tho. I. Elliott, Lieutenant and Acting Assistant Adjutant-General". In Davis, George B.; Perry, Leslie J.; Kirkley, Joseph W. (eds.). The War of the Rebellion: a Compilation of the Official Records of the Union and Confederate Armies Series I Volume XXXIX - Part I - Reports. Washington, DC: Government Printing Office. pp. 70–71.
- Fordney, Ben Fuller (2008). George Stoneman: A Biography of the Union General. Jefferson, North Carolina: McFarland & Company, Inc. ISBN 978-0-78648-346-4. OCLC 1476941238.
- Gillem, Alvan C. (1902). "Report of Brig. Gen. Alvan C. Gillem, U.S. Army". In Ainsworth, Fred C.; Kirkley, Joseph W. (eds.). The War of the Rebellion: a Compilation of the Official Records of the Union and Confederate Armies Additions and Corrections to Series I Volume XLV. Washington, DC: Government Printing Office. pp. 819–824. OCLC 318422190.
- Giltner, Henry L. (1902). "Report of Col. Henry L. Giltner, Fourth Kentucky Cavalry". In Ainsworth, Fred C.; Kirkley, Joseph W. (eds.). The War of the Rebellion: a Compilation of the Official Records of the Union and Confederate Armies Additions and Corrections to Series I Volume XLV. Washington, DC: Government Printing Office. pp. 840–841. OCLC 318422190.
- Johnston II, Angus J. (August 1957). "Virginia Railroads in April 1861". Journal of Southern History. 23 (3). Rice University: 307–330. doi:10.2307/2954883. JSTOR 2954883. Archived from the original on July 12, 2024.
- Kentucky; Lindsey, Daniel Weisiger (1867). Report of the Adjutant General of the State of Kentucky: Printed by authority of the Legislature of Kentucky ... 1861-1866 Vol. II. Frankfort, Kentucky: Kentucky Yeoman Office. OCLC 3260395.
- McKnight, Brian D. (2006). Contested Borderland: The Civil War in Appalachian Kentucky and Virginia. Lexington, Kentucky: University Press of Kentucky. ISBN 978-0-81317-127-2. OCLC 70262485.
- Mason, Frank Holcomb (1871). The Twelfth Ohio Cavalry; A Record of its Organization, and Services in the War of the Rebellion, Together with a Complete Roster of the Regiment. Cleveland, Ohio: Nevins' Steam Printing House. OCLC 37340011.
- Matthews, Gary Robert (2005). Basil Wilson Duke, CSA: The Right Man in the Right Place. Lexington, Kentucky: University Press of Kentucky. ISBN 978-0-81317-177-7. OCLC 65377684.
- Morton, Richard (1900). "Letter from Richard Morton; Confederate States of America; War Department, Niter and Mining Bureau". In Ainsworth, Fred C.; Kirkley, Joseph W. (eds.). The War of the Rebellion: a Compilation of the Official Records of the Union and Confederate Armies Series IV - Volume III - Section 2. Washington, DC: Government Printing Office. p. 1175. OCLC 318422190.
- Starr, Stephen Z. (1985). The Union Cavalry in the Civil War - Vol. III - The War in the West, 1861–1865. Baton Rouge, Louisiana: Louisiana State University Press. ISBN 978-0-80710-859-8. OCLC 4492585.
- Stephens, Ann S. (1867). Pictorial History of the War for the Union : A Complete and Reliable History of the War from its Commencement to its Close ... Together with a Complete Chronological Analysis of the War. New York City: B.W. Hitchcock. OCLC 5967902.
- Stoneman, George (1902). "Reports of Maj. Gen. George Stoneman, U.S. Army, commanding". In Ainsworth, Fred C.; Kirkley, Joseph W. (eds.). The War of the Rebellion: a Compilation of the Official Records of the Union and Confederate Armies Additions and Corrections to Series I Volume XLV. Washington, DC: Government Printing Office. pp. 807–815. OCLC 318422190.
- Trowbridge, Luther S. (1905). A Brief History of the Tenth Michigan Cavalry. Detroit, Michigan: Nevins' Steam Printing House (Lib. of Congress Image 48). Archived from the original on July 11, 2024.
- Unknown (1892). "Abstract from return of the forces in the Department of Western Virginia and East Tennessee, Maj. Gen. John C. Breckinridge commanding, for November 10, 1864; headquarters Wytheville Va.". In Davis, George B.; Perry, Leslie J.; Kirkley, Joseph W. (eds.). The War of the Rebellion: a Compilation of the Official Records of the Union and Confederate Armies Part III Correspondence Series I Volume XXXIX. Washington, DC: Government Printing Office. p. 907. OCLC 318422190.
- Vaughn, John C. (1902). "Reports of Brig. Gen. John C. Vaughn, C.S. Army". In Ainsworth, Fred C.; Kirkley, Joseph W. (eds.). The War of the Rebellion: a Compilation of the Official Records of the Union and Confederate Armies Additions and Corrections to Series I Volume XLV. Washington, DC: Government Printing Office. pp. 834–836. OCLC 318422190.
- Walker, Gary C. (1985). The War in Southwest Virginia, 1861-65. Roanoke, Virginia: A & W Enterprise. ISBN 978-0-96178-969-5. OCLC 1141634366.
- Whisonant, Richard C. (May 1996). "Geology and the Civil War in Southwestern Virginia: The Wythe County Lead Mines" (PDF). Virginia Minerals. 42 (2). Charlottesville, Virginia: Commonwealth of Virginia, Department of Mines, Minerals, and Energy: 13–19. Archived from the original on August 8, 2017.
- Whisonant, Richard C. (November 1997). "Geology and the Civil War in Southwestern Virginia: Union Raiders in the New River Valley, May 1864" (PDF). Virginia Minerals. 43 (4). Charlottesville, Virginia: Commonwealth of Virginia, Department of Mines, Minerals, and Energy: 29–39. Archived from the original on November 16, 2021.
- Whisonant, Robert C. (2015). Arming the Confederacy: How Virginia's Minerals Forged the Rebel War Machine. Cham, Switzerland: Springer International Publishing. ISBN 978-3-319-14508-2. OCLC 903929889.
- Witcher, Vincent A. (1902). "Reports of Lieut. Col. Vincent A. Witcher....". In Ainsworth, Fred C.; Kirkley, Joseph W. (eds.). The War of the Rebellion: a Compilation of the Official Records of the Union and Confederate Armies Additions and Corrections to Series I Volume XLV. Washington, DC: Government Printing Office. pp. 828–829. OCLC 318422190.
