= 6th United States Colored Cavalry Regiment =

- Active: 1864–1866
- Country: United States
- Allegiance: United States Union
- Branch: Cavalry; United States Colored Troops
- Size: Regiment
- Engagements: American Civil War: Battle of Saltville; Battle of Marion

Commanders
- Notable commanders: Col. James F. Wade

The 6th United States Colored Cavalry Regiment was a regiment of the Union army composed of African-American troops recruited from Kentucky during the American Civil War.

== Slavery and recruitment in Kentucky ==
Slavery was legal in Kentucky until 1865, and as a border state Kentucky initially declared neutrality at the start of the secession crisis. The Federal government was anxious to keep Kentucky slaveholders friendly to the Union, Abraham Lincoln wrote in September 1861: "I think to lose Kentucky is nearly the same as to lose the whole game". A Confederate invasion of Kentucky in 1861 swayed the state to take a pro-Union stance, and many white Kentuckians joined the Union Army. The Enrollment Act of 1863 that authorized conscription in the North was amended in February 1864 to allow for conscription of Black soldiers into the US Army, specifying that any slave drafted into the military would be freed. This law was widely opposed by slave owners in the border states. Not only did the slaveholders feel that conscription would be robbing them of their "property", many whites were opposed in principle to Black troops joining the Army. In April General Stephen G. Burbridge, a native Kentuckian, modified the recruiting procedures for Kentucky: slaves would only be accepted into the army with the slaveholder's consent, and owners would be compensated. Many slaves went to join the army, with or without permission, and by June General Burbridge ordered that any man wishing to join would be accepted. By September 1864, more than 14,000 Black Kentuckians had joined the army.

== Unit history ==
The 6th Colored Cavalry was completed organization on November 1, 1864, at Camp Nelson, Kentucky, and was initially intended to fight local Confederate guerillas alongside the 5th Colored Cavalry.

Under the command of General Burbridge, the 6th Colored Cavalry (not yet fully organized) marched into Virginia to destroy Confederate salt mines. General William T. Sherman questioned the usefulness of this expedition, writing "I doubt the necessity of your sending far into Virginia to destroy the salt- works, or any other material interest; we must destroy their armies," but the mission went ahead and the Union troops fought against Confederates and local militia at the Battle of Saltville in October. Following the battle, some Black soldiers captured and recovering from their wounds were executed in cold blood by Confederate guerillas. During Stoneman's 1864 raid into Virginia, the regiment joined the Union forces in their attempt to damage Confederate-controlled infrastructure and supply points in southwest Virginia. In December, the regiment fought in the Battle of Marion, the largest clash during Stoneman's Virginia raid.

Following the campaign in Virginia, the 6th Colored Cavalry returned to Kentucky for remainder of the war, fighting off guerilla attacks in various parts of their home state. The regiment was mustered out of service on April 15, 1866.

Casualties of the 6th US Colored Cavalry included 4 killed and 4 missing at Saltville, 5 killed and 24 missing at Marion, and 2 killed and 19 missing at Smithfield.

== Commanders ==
All officers of the United States Colored Troops during the Civil War were white; Black soldiers would not be commissioned as officers in the US Army until after the war.
Commanding officers of the 6th US Colored Cavalry:

- Col. James F. Wade, later promoted to general, commanded Buffalo Soldiers in the post-war era.
- Lt. Col. James Sanks Brisbin
- Lt. Col. Albert Coats

== See also ==
- List of United States Colored Troops Civil War Units
- United States Colored Troops
