= 45th Kentucky Mounted Infantry Regiment =

- Active: October 10, 1863 - February 14, 1865
- Country: United States of America
- Allegiance: Union
- Branch: United States Army
- Type: Mounted infantry
- Engagements: American Civil War: Battle of Mt. Sterling; Battle of Cynthiana; Battle of Saltville I; Battle of Marion; Battle of Saltville II

The 45th Kentucky Mounted Infantry Regiment was a mounted infantry regiment that served in the Union Army during the American Civil War.

== Service ==
The 45th Kentucky Mounted Infantry Regiment was organized at large and mustered in on October 10, 1863, under the command of Colonel John Mason Brown.

The regiment was attached to District of North Central Kentucky, 1st Division, XXIII Corps, Department of the Ohio, to January 1864. District of Southwest Kentucky, 1st Division, XXIII Corps, to April 1864. 4th Brigade, 1st Division, District of Kentucky, 5th Division, XXIII Corps, Department of the Ohio, to July 1864. 2nd Brigade, 1st Division, District of Kentucky, to January 1865. Unattached, District of Kentucky, February 1865.

Companies A, B, C, D, E, and F of the 45th Kentucky Infantry mustered out of service on December 24, 1864; Companies G, H, I, and K mustered out of service on February 14, 1865.

== Detailed service ==
First organized as a battalion for service in the eastern counties of Kentucky and on the Virginia border, and so served until October 1863. At Mt. Sterling, Ky., and covered the front from Cumberland Gap to Louisa until March 1864. Action at Salyersville, Ky.; November 30, 1863. Moved to Flemmingsburg March 1864; thence to Irvine, Ky., and operated south of that point until July. Pound Gap April 19 (detachment). Troublesome Creek April 27. Morganfield May 5. Operations against Morgan May 31-June 20. Near Pound Gap June 1. Mt. Sterling June 9. Cynthiana June 12. Operations against guerrillas in Owen and Trimble Counties July and August. Burbridge's Expedition into southwest Virginia September 20-October 17. Action at Saltville October 2. Stoneman's Raid into southwest Virginia December 10–29. Bristol, Va., December 13. Abington, Va., December 15. Near Marion December 17–18. Saltville December 20–21. Capture and destruction of salt works.

== Casualties ==
The regiment lost a total of 113 men during service; 10 enlisted men killed or mortally wounded, 1 officer and 102 enlisted men died of disease.

== Commanders ==
- Colonel John Mason Brown

== See also ==
- List of Kentucky Civil War Units
- Kentucky in the Civil War
- John Mason Brown, the son of Colonel Brown
