= 5th United States Colored Cavalry Regiment =

5th United States Colored Cavalry
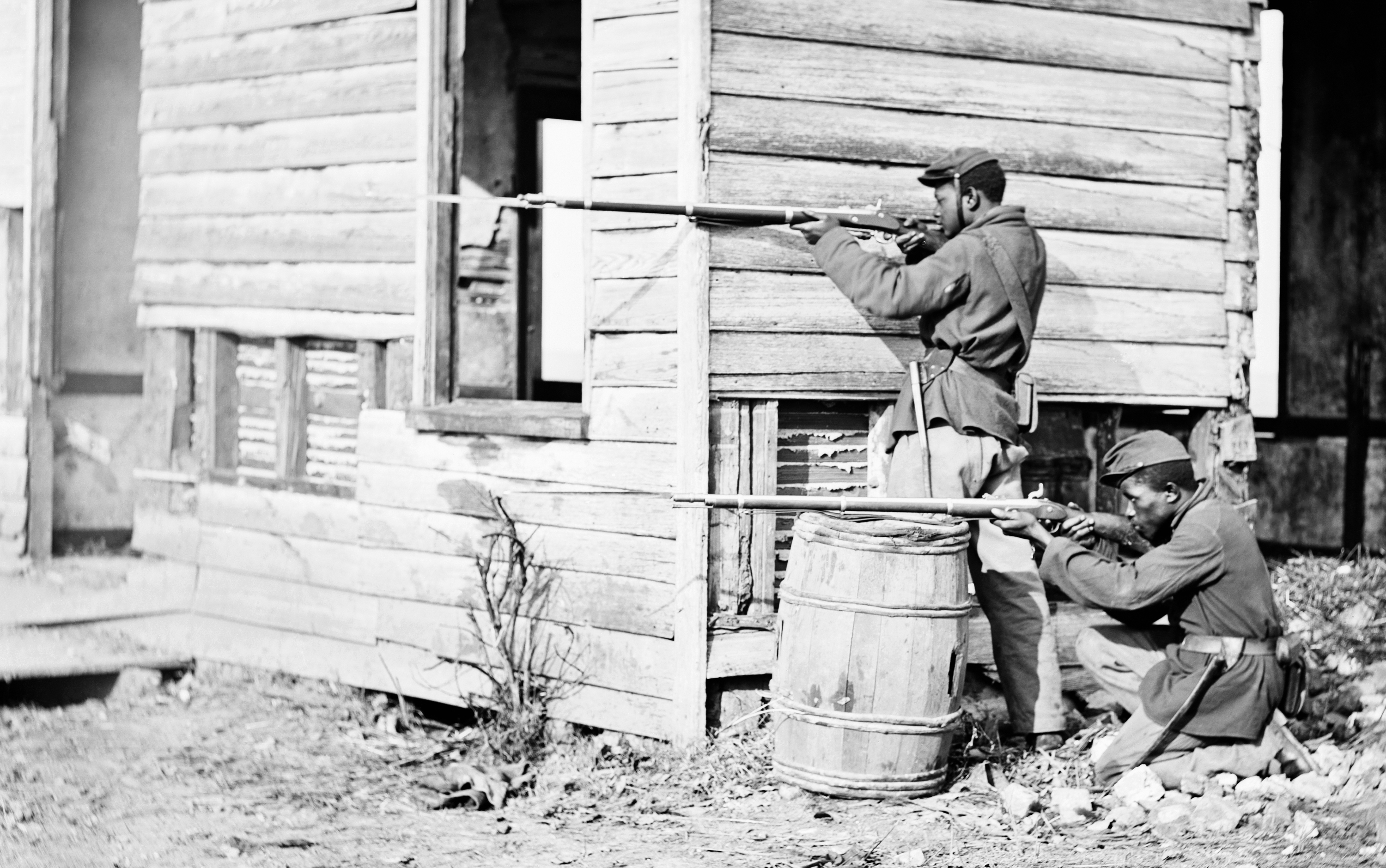
- African-American Union soldiers at Dutch Gap, Virginia, November 1864. It shows typical Union uniforms and the 1853 Enfield rifles used by US Colored Troops
- Active: 1864–1866
- Country: United States
- Allegiance: Union
- Branch: Cavalry
- Size: Regiment
- Engagements: American Civil War: First Battle of Saltville; Battle of Marion; Second Battle of Saltville

Commanders
- Notable commanders: James Sanks Brisbin; Louis Henry Carpenter

The 5th United States Colored Cavalry was a regiment of the United States Army organized as one of the units of the United States Colored Troops during the American Civil War. The 5th USCC was one of the more notable black fighting units. It was officially organized in Kentucky in October 1864, after its first two battles. It was commanded by Colonel James Brisbin until February 1865, when he took over the 6th US Colored Cavalry. His executive officer, Louis Henry Carpenter, commanded the regiment until 20 March 1866.

The regiment was composed of ex-slaves, freedmen, and slaves who had escaped to Union lines. Many white officers from the unit were later assigned to the famed Buffalo Soldiers cavalry units who operated during the Indian Wars in the West. Many USCC soldiers (later called troopers) volunteered for further service after their Civil War units were retired. This regiment is not to be confused with the 5th Massachusetts Colored Cavalry.

== Organization ==
In the early months of 1864, General Stephen Gano Burbridge, commander of the Military District of Kentucky, issued General Order No. 24/ This authorized the formation of colored units in his command. They were composed of ex-slaves, freedmen, and slaves who had escaped to Union lines. Although the unit was not officially formed as part of the United States Colored Troops until 24 October 1864, it saw combat on two different occasions.

Its first major encounter was on 2 October 1864, in and around the salt works of Saltville, Virginia. When word of Burbridge's raid reached the 5th USCC, the regiment had yet to be officially organized until after they returned from the raid. At the time of the battle, over 600 colored soldiers joined General Burbridge in the, as yet unorganized, 5th USCC. Although the regiment consisted of black cavalrymen, the officers of the regiment were required to be white. The white officers would then organize noncommissioned field officers among the ranks of the black soldiers to fill the positions of sergeants. However, Lieutenant Colonel L. Henry Carpenter soon realized that his newly formed black troops were illiterate. Therefore, Carpenter petitioned command to place white noncommissioned officers in charge of the black units. His request was granted, and hastily the 5th USCC was formed. Some soldiers had not officially enlisted; few officers had been appointed, and fewer non-commissioned officers (NCO) were assigned. Yet Colonel James F. Wade was temporarily placed in charge of the group with orders to join Burbridge in Kentucky. In his haste to create the unit, Wade mounted his 600 men on untrained horses and supplied them with Enfield infantry rifles. These were useless to mounted men as they could not be loaded from horseback. In comparison, the troops of the 11th Michigan and 12th Ohio cavalries were armed with Spencer repeating carbines, which were wholly effective from horseback.

General Burbridge had been ordered by General Grant to proceed into southwest Virginia and destroy the salt works at Saltville. The 5th USCC, therefore, was attached to Colonel Brisbin's forces and joined Burbridge in Prestonburg, Kentucky. Burbridge left Prestonburg on 27 September to march towards Saltville. White troops resented the blacks and subjected them to ridicule. They sometimes pulled their hats off or stole their horses, but the black soldiers conducted themselves with professional conduct.

== Battle of Saltville and the 5th USCC ==
The 5th USCC participated in the Second Battle of Saltville on 1–3 October 1864, as part of the Union forces under the command of General Stephen Gano Burbridge. Despite valiant attempts to break through Confederate lines, the cavalry was repeatedly repulsed. The Union forces were defeated. In the ensuing hours after its finish, Confederate partisans, led by Champ Ferguson, murdered captured and wounded Union soldiers, notably members of the 5th USCC, in their hospital beds. Ferguson was arrested after the war had ended and tried for the murders. He was convicted in the trial in Nashville and sentenced to death by hanging. He was one of only three men to be executed for war crimes that took place during the American Civil War.

== Stoneman's 1864 Winter Raid ==
In December 1864, General George Stoneman ordered the 5th USCC to participate in a raid from East Tennessee into southwestern Virginia. This resulted in engagements that involved the 5th USCC at Hopkinsville, Kentucky on 12 December, Kingsport, Tennessee on 13 December, the Battle of Marion near Marion, Virginia on 17 & 18 December, and the Second Battle of Saltville on 20 and 21 December near Saltville, Virginia. All were considered Union victories.

During the Battle of Marion, Division Commander Stephen G. Burbridge ordered the 5th USCC between two white units on the left flank of the Union line. Lieutenant Colonel James S. Brisbin and his second in command, Carpenter, led their dismounted soldiers forward toward the Confederate defensive works. The Confederates opened heavy fire upon the advancing Union troops, which included four ten-pound Parrott rifled cannons. The first Union charge wavered and fell back. Carpenter ordered his men to reform and rally. With a mighty yell the 5th USCC rushed forward toward the breastworks but could not break the defensive line. Carpenter ordered the men to dig in and night fell. Volunteers went out between lines to rescue the wounded.

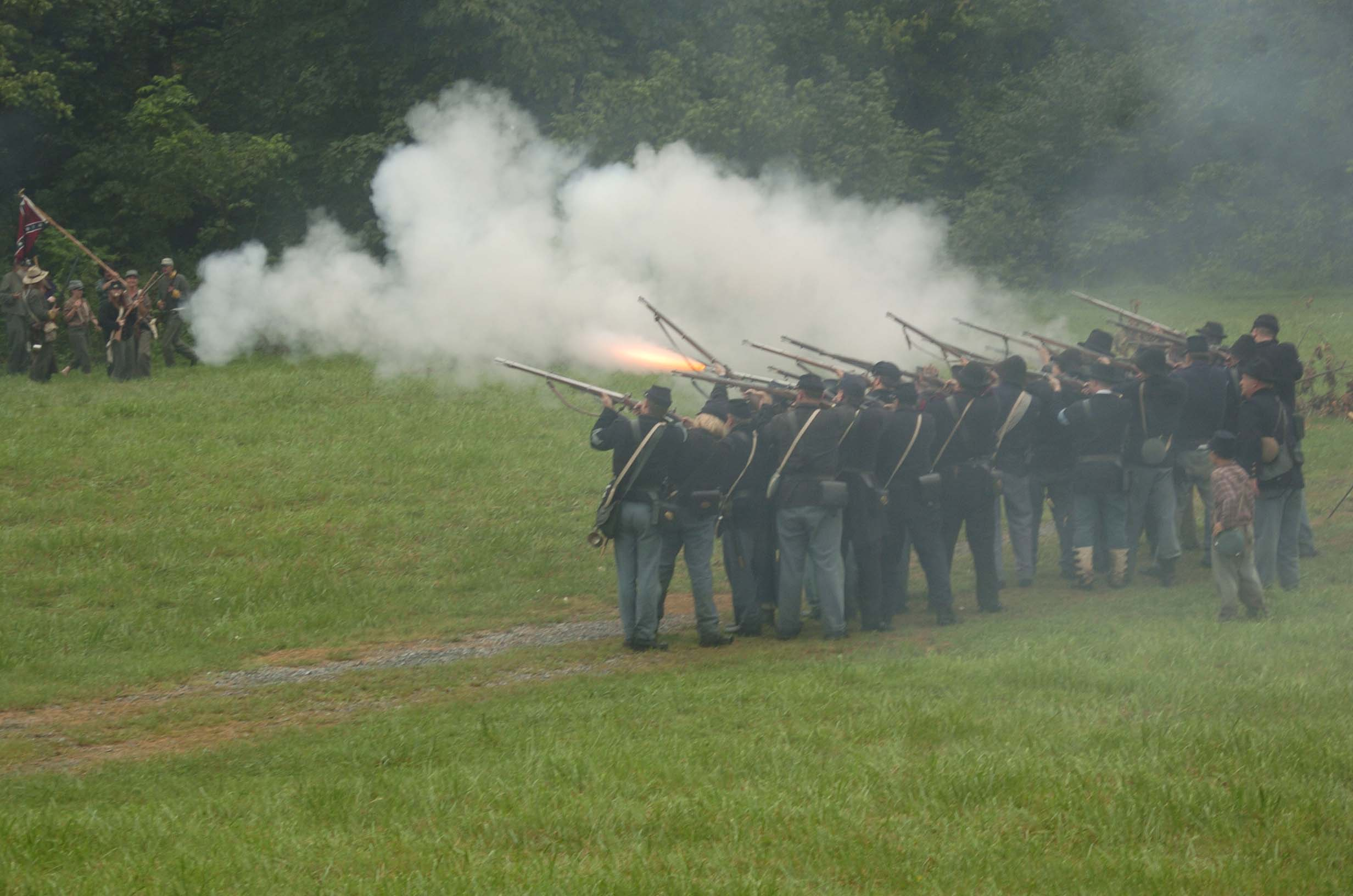
Union re-enactors recreate the Battle of Saltville in Saltville, Virginia on August 20, 2006.

On 18 December, the morning was cold and rainy with a light fog. The second day began as a copy of the first with multiple Union charges. The Union center was able to breach the center of the Confederate breastworks but were pushed out by a Rebel counterattack. Carpenter led a mounted rescue force of colored soldiers to save white soldiers trapped near a covered bridge on the left flank. Carpenter made several attempts but could not rescue the soldiers. Most of those trapped soldiers would be captured later that afternoon, but were released before giving their parole.

Later that day the Confederate reinforcements made a charge on the Union left flank. The white unit adjacent to the 5th USCC was completely routed, and the 5th USCC flank was threatened. Ordered to fall back, Carpenter and Brisbin tried to maintain an orderly retreat. Many colored soldiers, remembering the murder of their comrades during the first battle of Saltville, broke ranks to rescue their wounded comrades. The retreat threatened to become a rout. About 4 PM, Union reinforcements arrived and bolstered the Union line. During the night, Confederate forces were forced to retire due to the lack of ammunition. The next day Union forces buried the dead and helped the wounded. The costly victory marked the highpoint of Stoneman's raid.

On the afternoon of 20 December, Union forces attacked Saltville, Virginia. Confederate forces were overwhelmed when the 5th & 6th USCC entered the fray with a cold vengeance. Outnumbered Confederate forces retreated and awaited promised reinforcements.

Union forces hastily attempted to destroy the vital salt works. They destroyed about one third of the boiling kettles and most evaporating sheds. They also damaged portions of the Virginia & Tennessee railroad. But they failed to destroy or damage the salt wells. General Stoneman claimed a victory and retreated from Virginia before Confederate forces could completely surround him. Carpenter's role was not well documented in letters or other documents; he is noted as being there. Within three months, the Confederates had the saltworks back in full production. Carpenter later wrote a long letter home about this battle and how his men responded.

== Ambush at Simpsonville ==
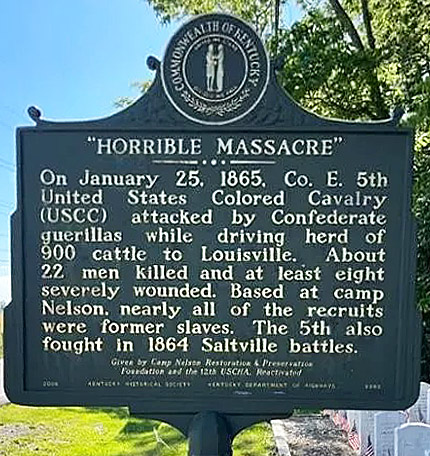
Plaque commemorating those lost, with gravestones visible on the right side of the image. The massacre was the subject of a 2026 Secrets of the Dead documentary on PBS, "Remembering the Fallen Soldiers of the Simpsonville Massacre".

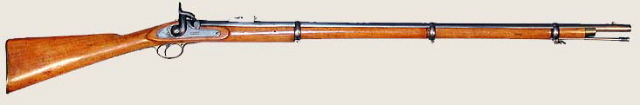
1853 Enfield Rifle-Musket was the second most used infantry weapon used in the Civil War. It was 55 inches (1,400 mm) long and fired a .577 calibre Minié-type lead ball projectile, propelled by black powder and a copper percussion cap. Because it was a muzzle-loading weapon, it was unsuited for cavalry use.

On 23 January 1865, 80 Black soldiers of Company E, 5th US Colored Cavalry, under command of 2nd Lieutenant Augustus Flint, were assigned to move almost a thousand head of cattle from Camp Nelson to the stock yard at Louisville, Kentucky. The men were assigned mostly to the front and rear of the spread-out herd of cattle. About 41 men were bringing up the rear on 25 January near Simpsonville, when they were ambushed by Confederate guerrillas, led by Henry C. Magruder. Few of the Union troops were able to fire their muzzle-loaded Enfield infantry rifles, due to fouled powder. The guerrillas were armed with 6-shot revolvers, and most carried two or more. As Confederates quickly closed the distance, almost all of the colored soldiers bringing up the rear were wounded or dismounted. Only two escaped harm, one by playing dead, and the other hiding under an overturned wagon box. The forward group panicked and fled.

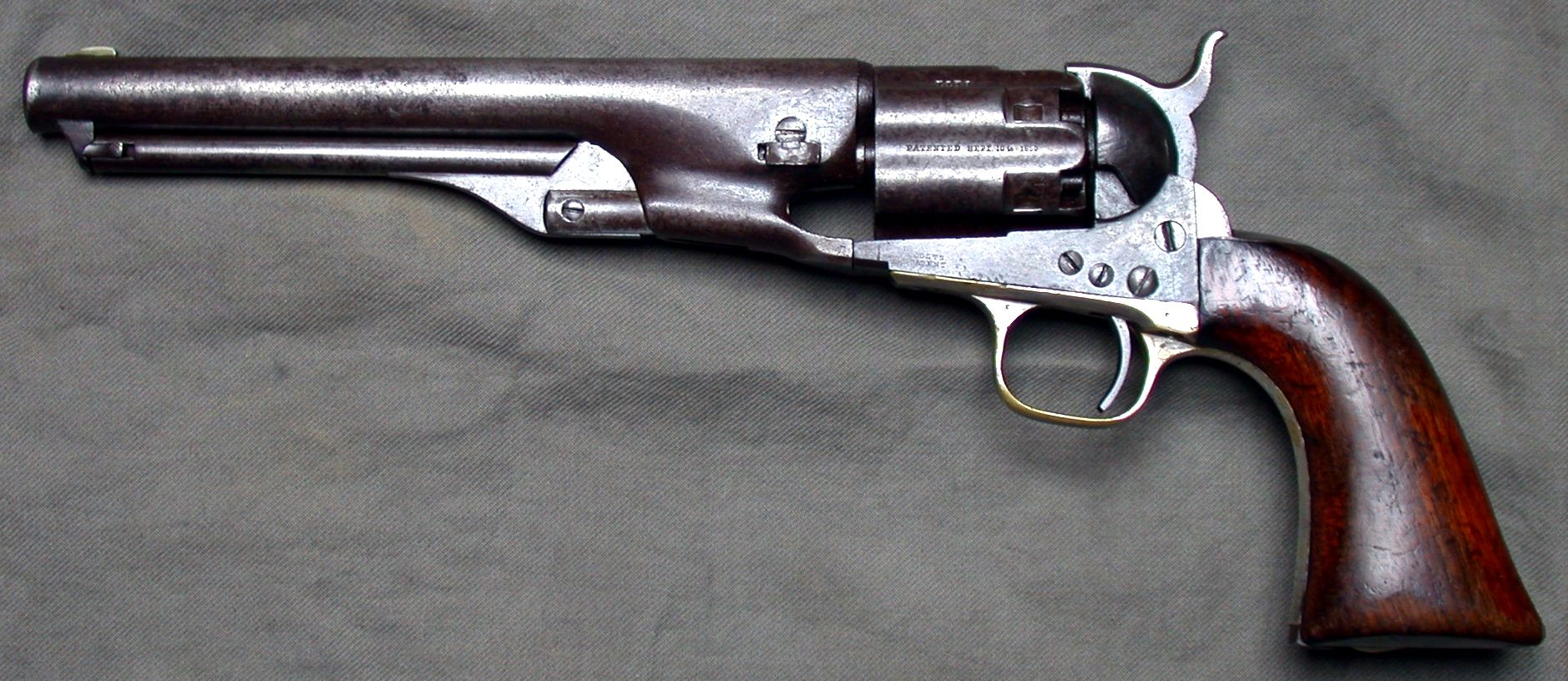
The Colt .44-caliber "Army" Model—the type used by the guerillas to their advantage—was one of the most widely used revolvers of the Civil War. It had a six-shot, rotating cylinder, and fired a 0.454-inch-diameter (11.5 mm) round lead ball projectile, propelled by black powder and a copper percussion cap.

About an hour after the ambush, local citizens found 15 dead and 20 wounded soldiers on and near the road. Four more soldiers were later found dead of wounds or of exposure nearby. The men of Simpsonville took 20 wounded men back to town; 8 of the men so severely wounded they were not expected to live. A total of six soldiers died en route or in Louisville. It was later determined that at least some of the Union soldiers had been murdered trying to surrender or after being disarmed. The remainder of the Union wounded were left to die in the freezing cold. Three soldiers remained missing in the final accounting.

Flint, who was in town during the ambush, fled to Louisville. Authorities telegraphed Camp Nelson, and Carpenter immediately ordered ambulances. A heavy escort mounted and arrived on scene on 28 January. They took the surviving wounded to a hospital in Louisville. Locals reported what had happened and the boasts of the Confederate guerrillas, led by Captain Dick Taylor, who had murdered or shot many of the Union soldiers after they had been captured. The mass grave was located, and an effort was made to find the missing men. Carpenter wrote a report and documented the names of the known guerrillas. He encouraged a hunt to capture and prosecute them, but it was never undertaken. However, Henry Magruder would be tried, convicted, and sentenced to death by a military tribunal for other crimes. He was executed at the Louisville Military Prison on 20 October 1865.

A memorial marker commemorating the ambush and murder of US Colored Troops was unveiled in 2009.

== End of the 5th USCC ==
The 5th USCC remained on duty for almost a year after the surrender of the Army of Northern Virginia at Appomattox Court House. On 16 March 1866, the 5th USCC held its final formation in Helena, Arkansas. It was an occasion for honoring the 50 missing soldiers from the first battle of Saltville.

Historians believe that it is likely the murdered black soldiers who were being treated at Wiley Hall may have been buried at what is now known as the Holston Cemetery on campus. This has not been proven. There are common names among the men of the Federal and Confederate 5th Kentucky regiments. Confederate graves on the campus may not be accurately marked.

== Battles of the 5th USCC ==
Summary of battles of the 5th USCC.

1864

2 October - Saltville, Virginia - First Battle of Saltville

21 October - Harrodsburg, Kentucky - an engagement

12 December - Hopkinsville, Kentucky - an engagement

13 December - Kingsport, Tennessee (flanking movement & skirmishing)

17–18 December 1864, Marion, Virginia - Battle of Marion

20–21 December - Saltville, Virginia - Second Battle of Saltville

1865

25 January - Simpsonville, KY - an ambush

== See also ==
- List of battles fought in Kentucky
- List of United States Colored Troops Civil War Units
