= 11th Michigan Cavalry Regiment =

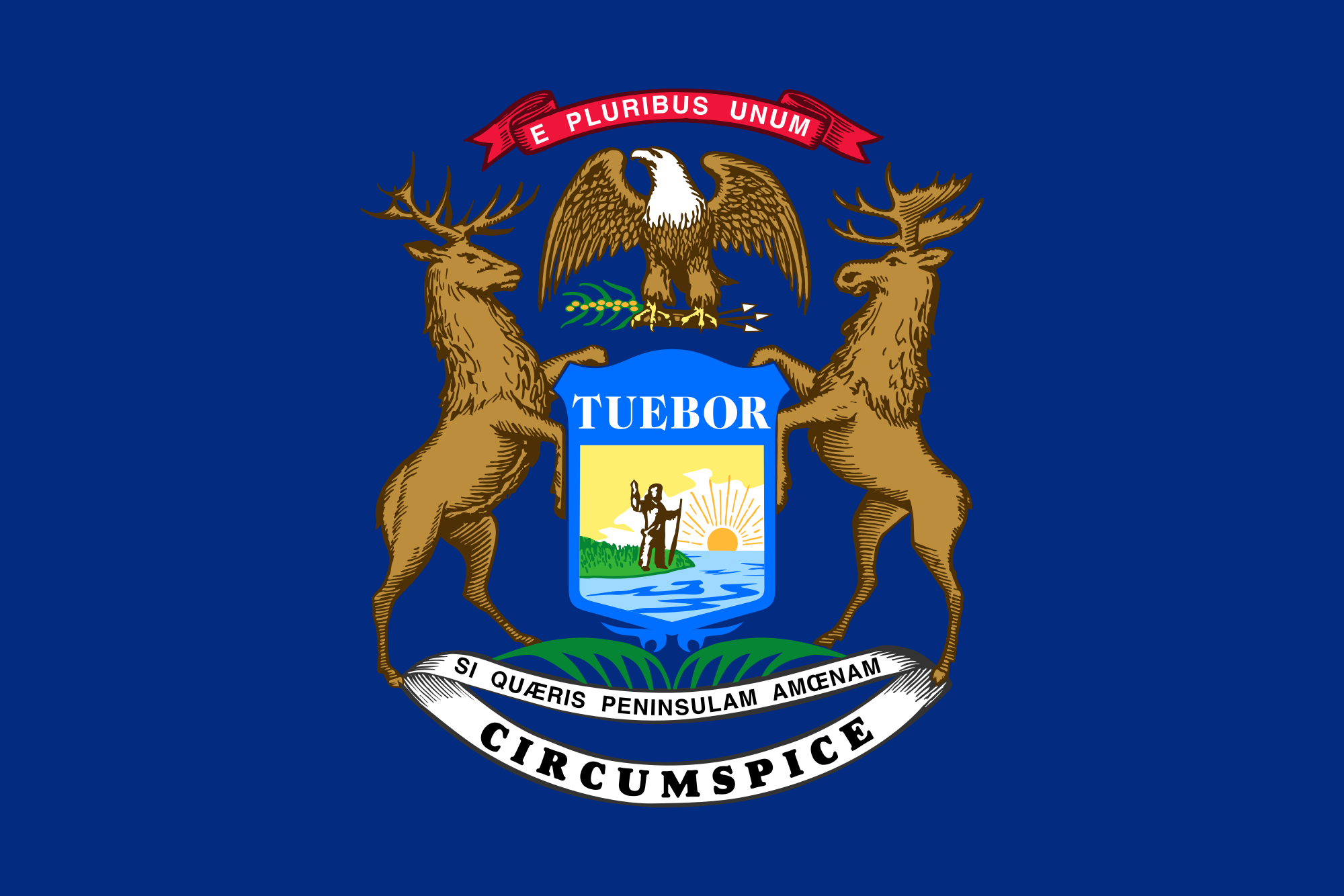
- Michigan state flag
- Active: October 7, 1863 – July 20, 1865
- Disbanded: July 20, 1865
- Country: United States
- Allegiance: Union
- Branch: Cavalry
- Size: Regiment
- Engagements: American Civil War

Commanders
- Colonel: Simeon B. Brown
- 1st Lieutenant: Willard Sterns
- 2nd Lieutenant: Clark W. Decker

The 11th Michigan Cavalry Regiment was a cavalry regiment that served in the Union Army during the American Civil War.

== Service ==
The 11th Michigan Cavalry was organized at Kalamazoo and Detroit, Michigan October 10 and December 10, 1863. Among its ranks was future Michigan politician and author Elroy M. Avery.

The Regiment was part of General George Stoneman's campaign into eastern Tennessee, western Virginia, North Carolina, and South Carolina in 1865. The 11th Michigan Cavalry was one of three regiments in the Second Brigade of Colonel Simeon B. Brown of St. Clair. The regiment was consolidated with the 8th Michigan Volunteer Cavalry Regiment on July 20, 1865. Mustered out in Nashville Tennessee on September 22, 1865.

== Engagements ==
=== Kentucky ===
Hazel Green, McCormick's Farm, Morristown, State Creek, Mt. Sterling, Cynthiana, June 8–9, Point Burnside, June 30, 1864.

=== Tennessee ===
Clinch River, Nov.28; Cobb's Ford, Dec. 2: Bristol, Dec. 13; Paperville, Dec. 13, 1864.

=== Virginia ===
Abingdon, Dec. 15; Wytheville lead mines, Mt. Airey, Marion iron works, Seven Miles Ford, Mount Sterling, Sept. 17; Saltville I, October 1–3, 1864, Union defeat.(Saltville Massacre); Sandy Mountain, Marion, December 17–18, 1864; Saltville II, December 18–21, 1864, destroyed salt works; After Saltville, returned to Knoxville; arrived Dec. 28, 1864; Departed Knoxville, March 16–21, 1865; Morristown, March 24; Jonesboro,

=== North Carolina ===
March 25. Crossing into North Carolina and heading south, they conducted a series of raids on sites manufacturing goods vital to Lee's troops—Boone, March 28–29 destroyed Patterson yarn mill below Blowing Rock; Yadkin River; Wilkesboro, March 30; Jonesville, April 1; Mount Airy, April 2; Christiansburg, VA, April 3; Danbury, April 9 destroying the Moratock Iron Works; Salisbury, April 12 (Destroyed prison); Statesville, April 13–16 (Taylorsville, April 14); April 14, Lincoln assassination; Morganton, April 17–19; Marion, April 20; Swannanoa Gap, (the Army was blocked there and went around to Howard's Gap) April 20; Hendersonville, April 24; Asheville, April 25–28; Marshall, April 26; Ward's Farm;

=== South Carolina ===
Leaving Brevard, pushing through Saluda Gap in the Blue Ridge, they entered South Carolina, looking for Jefferson Davis. Caesar's Head, April 30; Pickensville, Anderson's Court House.

== Total strength and casualties ==
Company H enlisted men, 106. Total regimental enrollment 1,579. The regiment suffered 4 officers and 24 enlisted men killed in action or mortally wounded and 114 enlisted men who died of disease, for a total of 142 fatalities.

== See also ==
- List of Michigan Civil War Units
- Michigan in the American Civil War
