= James Sanks Brisbin =

American Civil War Union Army general

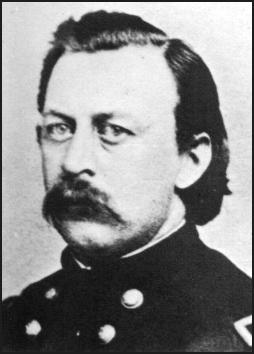
- Photo taken during or after the Civil War (1861-1865)
- Born: May 23, 1837; Boalsburg, Pennsylvania, U.S.
- Died: January 14, 1892 (aged 54); Philadelphia, Pennsylvania, U.S.
- Burial place: Oakwood Cemetery, Red Wing, Minnesota
- Military career
- Allegiance: United States of America; Union
- Branch: United States Army; Union Army
- Service years: 1861–1892
- Rank: Brigadier general Brevet major general
- Commands: 5th United States Colored Cavalry
- Conflicts: American Civil War; American Indian Wars

James Sanks Brisbin (May 23, 1837 – January 14, 1892) was an American educator, lawyer, historian, and author who served as a Union Army general during the American Civil War. After the conflict he remained in the military for the rest of his life, and authored several works on a variety of subjects.

== Early life and career ==
Brisbin was born in 1837 at Boalsburg, Pennsylvania, a son of Margaret and Ezra Brisbin. He studied at the Boalsburg Academy, and upon graduating he began teaching. He later purchased and edited the Centre Democrat newspaper in Bellefonte, Pennsylvania. He studied law and was admitted to the bar of Pennsylvania. Brisbin was known as an anti-slavery orator.

== Civil War service ==
When the American Civil War began in 1861, Brisbin enlisted in the Pennsylvania volunteer services that April as a private. On April 26, he was appointed a second lieutenant in the mounted 2nd U.S. Dragoons. He fought in the First Battle of Bull Run near Manassas, Virginia, on July 21. In this battle, Brisbin received two wounds, one in his side and the other in an arm, and was praised by his superiors for his performance during the fight.

On August 3, 1861, Brisbin transferred to the 1st U.S. Cavalry (previously known as the 1st Dragoons until a reorganization of the army) but then was appointed a captain in the 6th U.S. Cavalry two days later. On June 9, 1862, he fought during the action near Beverly Ford, Virginia, and was again wounded when he fell off of his horse. Exactly one year later Brisbin was brevetted to the rank of major for his conduct at Beverly Ford. In 1863 he very briefly led the cavalry forces in the Federal Department of the Susquehanna, and was wounded in a leg during combat near Greenbrier, Virginia, on July 26.

Brisbin was promoted to colonel on March 1, 1864, and organized the 5th United States Colored Cavalry. He served as the acting head of cavalry on the staff of Brig. Gen. Albert L. Lee during the Red River Campaign, and was again wounded during the Battle of Mansfield in Louisiana on April 8, this time in the right foot. On December 12, 1864, Brisbin was brevetted to brigadier general in the Union Army, and seven days later was appointed a brevet lieutenant colonel in the regular army for his performance at Battle of Marion in Tennessee. In 1865, he was on recruiting duty in Kentucky, serving on the staff of Maj. Gen. Stephen G. Burbridge. On March 13, Brisbin was brevetted to colonel in the regular army as well as brevetted major general in the Union Army, and on May 1 he was promoted to brigadier general. Brisbin was mustered out of the Union Army as a volunteer on January 15, 1866.

== Postbellum ==
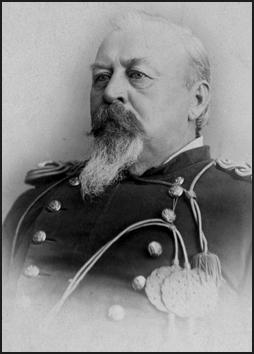
Brisbin in later life

After the war, Brisbin remained in the regular army, aiding in the establishment of other colored regiments and served in the Northwestern United States as an officer in several cavalry regiments. From 1868–92, he served as an officer in several cavalry regiments, including the Second, Ninth, First, and Eighth regiments in the Northwestern United States. Brisbin was in command of the 2nd Cavalry of General John Gibbon's Montana Column at the time of the Little Big Horn campaign. Brisbin offered four companies of his 2nd Cavalry to General George Armstrong Custer at the final command meeting of Generals Terry, Gibbon, and Custer just prior to the final march into the Big Horn valley, but Custer declined it, stating that the 7th Cavalry alone could defeat the hostiles. Brisbin never forgave Custer for this, and is alleged to have called the dead Custer an "insufferable ass". In various correspondence (see Graham "The Custer Myth", Philbrick, "The Last Stand") Brisbin was openly critical of Custer's actions - whether or not because of personal jealousy cannot be determined. Brisbin also penned the then-bestselling "Beef Bonanza" which urged investment in Open Range Cattle. At the time of his death he was a colonel in command of the Eighth Cavalry Regiment and was in command at Fort Meade. Brisbin died on January 14, 1892, in Philadelphia. He was buried in Oakwood Cemetery in Red Wing, Minnesota.

== Personal life ==
Brisbin married Mary Jane Wagner on June 15, 1861. They had four children. His wife died at Fort McKinney in 1887. In 1891 he married Amelia Wilson in Red Wing, Minnesota.

He was also a prolific writer, and contributed articles and letters to Eastern periodicals on many subjects throughout his career.

=== Selected literary works ===
- The Campaign Lives of Ulysses S. Grant and Schuyler Colfax (1869)
- Beldon, the White Chief (1870)
- The Beef Bonanza, or How to Get Rich on the Plains (1881)
- Brisbin's Stories of the Plains (1881)
- Life of President Garfield (1881)
- From the Tow-Path to the White House (1881)
- Trees and Tree Planting (1888)

== See also ==
- List of American Civil War generals (Union)
