= Comb grave =

Type of grave covering

A comb grave is a type of grave that features two slabs of rock, sandstone or sheet metal that form an empty inverted v-shape, or comb, over the length of the grave. They are also referred to as tent graves, as the slabs of rock resemble a camping tent. Comb graves may also have triangular end stones or iron rods to support the slabs, and sometimes do not have a headstone nor an inscription.

== Origin ==
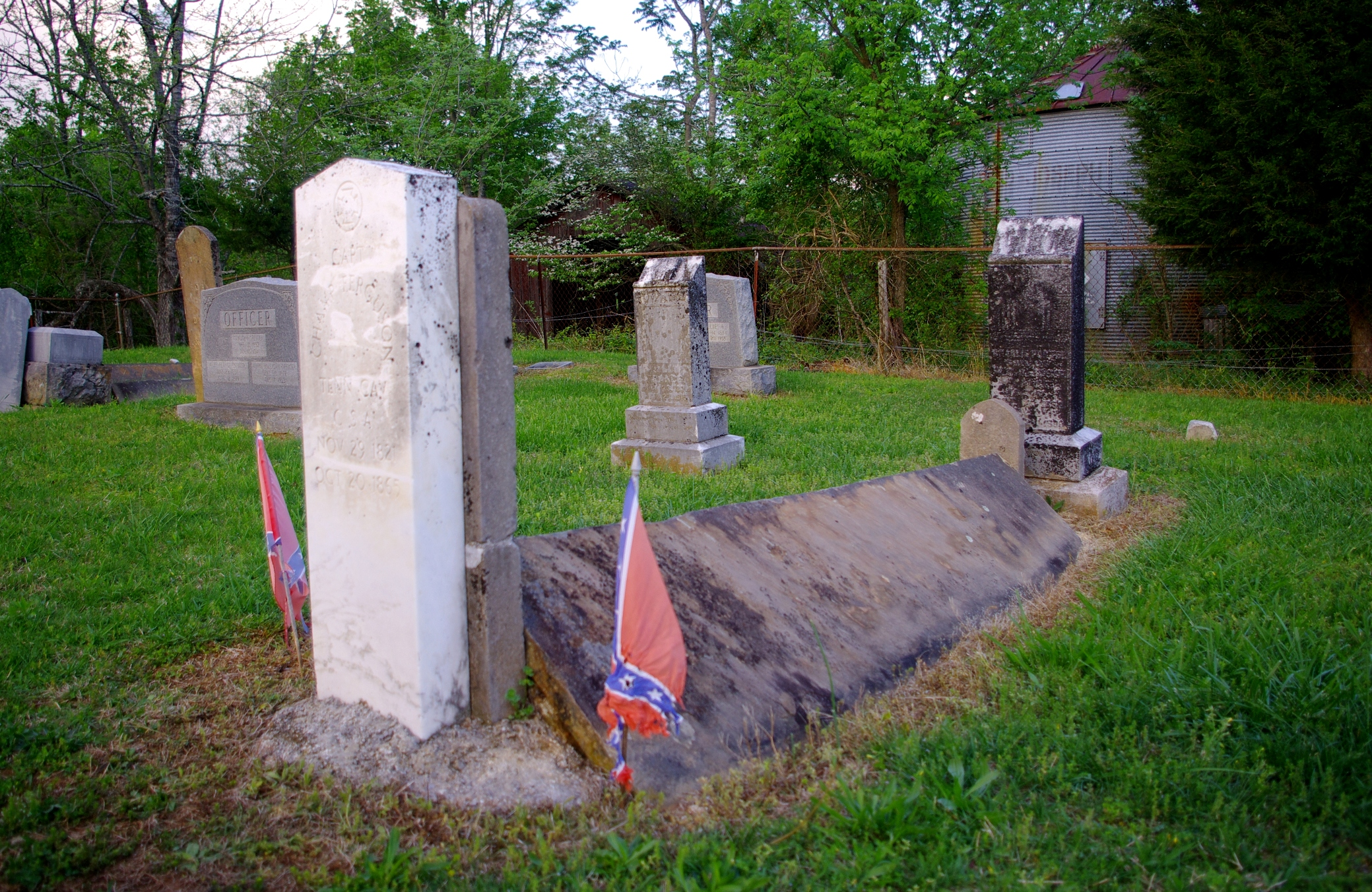
Comb grave of Champ Ferguson in White County, Tennessee

The exact origin of comb graves is unknown. According to oral tradition, the graves were first built in the 1800s to deter grave robbers and to protect sunken graves from being exposed to the surface. It also may have been a purely stylistic choice that became popular in the region. The oldest comb graves were made in the 1820s, with the practice surviving in Overton County, Tennessee until the 1960s.

== Geography ==
Comb graves are unique to the Southern United States and have been found in Alabama, Arkansas, Kentucky, Louisiana, Mississippi, Missouri, North Carolina, Oklahoma, Tennessee, Texas and West Virginia. They are most often found in cemeteries along the Cumberland River in Tennessee, where the practice may have originated. There are an estimated 3,000 comb graves in the Highland Rim and Cumberland Plateau regions in Tennessee, with hundreds to the north near Kentucky and hundreds more spread around northern Arkansas, Alabama and Georgia.
