= Battle of Anderson =

Battle of the American Civil War

Coordinates: 34.40516°N 82.45207°W

- Part of the American Civil War
Date	May 1, 1865
Location	Anderson, South Carolina
Result	Confederate victory

Belligerents
United States (Union)	(Confederate States of America) CSA (Confederacy)

Commanders and leaders
Simeon B. Brown	Unknown

Units involved
Three brigades	South Carolina Battalion of State Cadets

Strength
3,700 soldiers	unknown

Casualties and losses
2	0

The Battle of Anderson was a minor skirmish during the American Civil War, fought in Anderson County, South Carolina, on May 1, 1865. The battle was one of the final conflicts of the war, taking place three weeks after Robert E. Lee surrendered to Ulysses S. Grant at Appomattox Court House. The exact location of the battle is unknown, but it definitely took place in Anderson county. Some historians believe the battle took place near the now I-85 and the Shiloh Methodist Church in the Summit area. The battle is re-enacted every April. As of 2020, it has been re-enacted 17 times.

== Battle ==
=== Prelude ===
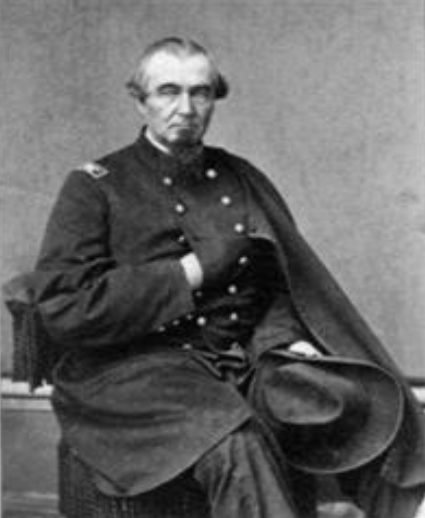
Brevet Brigadier General Simeon B. Brown

On April 27, Union General George Stoneman ordered three brigades, totaling 3,700 men, to march from Asheville down the Saluda River to Belton or Anderson, and finally to head to Augusta in search of Confederate president Jefferson Davis. After Stoneman gave those orders, he returned to his headquarters in Knoxville. He left behind some units under the command of Simeon B. Brown.

=== Fighting ===
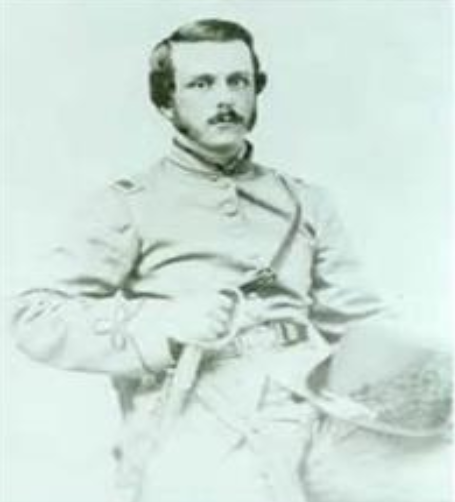
William McKenzie

On May 1, the Union forces arrived in Anderson County. After the Union army arrived, they looted homes and businesses from Pendleton to Anderson. They looted and disposed of 300 bottles of wine. While in Anderson, Union soldiers killed a teenager named William McKenzie Parker after he pointed his gun at the soldiers. The Union army also hung two men: Henry Winthrop and A.P Carter.

Later that day, a group of Confederate cadets from the South Carolina Military Academy attacked the Union forces. The Confederates repulsed a small group of Union soldiers who were intending to burn down a railroad bridge on the Saluda River. Meanwhile, some Union cavalry were attacked by a group of Confederate soldiers from Pendleton. Due to the Confederate victory, a man named Daniel Brown, who was being executed by the Union army, was rescued.

=== Aftermath ===
On May 2, the Union army publicly tortured three men, hoping that they could reveal the location of rumored Confederate gold. Also on May 2, another group of 2,050 Union soldiers arrived. However, the Union Army in Anderson was unable to capture Jefferson Davis. Davis had surrendered earlier, and was captured in Georgia on May 10.
