= Battle of Saltville =

The Battle of Saltville may refer to one of two American Civil War Battles fought at the same location:

- First Battle of Saltville (October 1–3, 1864)
- Second Battle of Saltville (December 20–21, 1864)
