= Simeon B. Brown =

American brigadier general

Simeon Batcheldor Brown
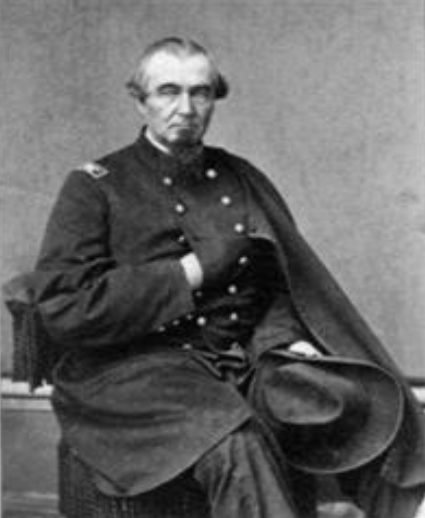
- Brown in 1865
- Born: March 1, 1812; Bridgewater, New Hampshire, U.S.
- Died: March 18, 1893 (aged 81); St. Clair, Michigan, U.S.
- Military career
- Allegiance: United States (Union)
- Branch: Union Army
- Service years: 1862 – 1865
- Rank: Colonel; Bvt. Brigadier General
- Unit: 6th Michigan Cavalry Regiment
- Commands: 11th Michigan Cavalry Regiment
- Conflicts: American Civil War; Morgan's Raid into Kentucky; Battle of Cynthiana; Carolinas campaign; Battle of Anderson

Simeon Batcheldor Brown (1812 – 1893) was an American brevet brigadier general who served in the American Civil War under the Union and commanded several battles of the war.

== Biography ==
=== Family ===
Brown was born on March 1, 1812, in Bridgewater, New Hampshire, the son of Benjamin Batcheldor and Mary Spaulding. Simeon married Adeline Brown in 1834, with whom he had his only child, Samuel, on January 1, 1839, who would go on to serve in the 5th New Hampshire Infantry Regiment. He later married Eliza Colby until his death.

=== American Civil War ===
He enlisted in the Union Army on August 14, 1862, as a major. On October 13 of the same year, he was assigned to the 6th Michigan Cavalry Regiment. On August 14, 1863, he was promoted to colonel, and on December 10 of the same year, he was given command of the newly formed 11th Michigan Cavalry Regiment. He would lead the regiment at the Battle of Cynthiana during Morgan's Raid into Kentucky. He was then promoted to brevet brigadier general on January 1, 1865 and took part in Stoneman's 1865 raid as commander of three Cavalry Regiments. Brown participated in the Battle of Anderson in South Carolina, a battle that occurred three weeks after Robert E. Lee's surrender at Appomattox Court House. Brown then resigned from the Army on June 11, 1865. He died in Saint Clair, Michigan, on March 18, 1893.
