= James F. Wade =

United States Army general (1843–1921)

James Franklin Wade
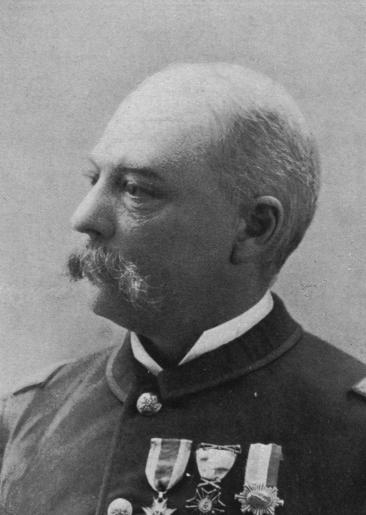
- James Franklin Wade, c. 1899
- Born: April 14, 1843; Jefferson, Ohio, U.S.
- Died: August 23, 1921 (aged 78); Jefferson, Ohio, U.S.
- Burial place: Oakdale Cemetery, Jefferson, Ohio
- Relatives: Benjamin Wade (father); Edward Wade (uncle); Ellen Maria Colfax (cousin)
- Military career
- Allegiance: United States of America; Union
- Branch: United States Army; Union Army
- Service years: 1861–1907
- Rank: Major General
- Commands: 6th United States Colored Cavalry; 5th Cavalry Regiment; Department of Dakota; Third Army Corps; Department of Southern Luzon; Division of the Philippines; Division of the Atlantic
- Conflicts: American Civil War; Battle of Brandy Station; Battle of Marion; American Indian Wars; Spanish–American War; Philippine–American War

James Franklin Wade (April 14, 1843 – August 23, 1921) served as a major general of volunteers in the United States Army during the Spanish–American War. During the American Civil War, he progressed from lieutenant to colonel and brevet brigadier general in the Union Army cavalry in less than four years.

== Biography ==
Wade was born in Jefferson, Ohio on April 14, 1843. His father, Senator Benjamin F. Wade, was a Radical Republican senator from Ohio during the Civil War, and a harsh critic of President Abraham Lincoln and his successor, Andrew Johnson.

James Wade commissioned a lieutenant in the 6th Cavalry Regiment (United States) from the state of Ohio on May 14, 1861, which he accepted on June 24, 1861. He performed exceptionally well at Beverly Ford on the Rappahannock River during the Battle of Brandy Station where he earned a brevet promotion to captain on June 9, 1863 for gallant and meritorious service.

Wade was appointed brevet lieutenant colonel of the 6th US Colored Cavalry on May 1, 1864 marking the start of a 23-year career commanding African-American cavalrymen. On September 19, 1864, he was promoted to colonel and commander of the regiment. He received a brevet promotion to major on December 19, 1864 for gallant and meritorious service in action at East Marion, Tennessee. Wade received further brevets to lieutenant colonel and colonel on March 13, 1865. for meritorious service during the war, and yet another to brigadier general of volunteers on February 13, 1865 for gallant service in the campaign in southwestern Virginia.

On July 28, 1866, he was promoted to the permanent rank of major in the newly established 9th Cavalry Regiment (United States) on July 28, 1866. This was one of the "Buffalo Soldier" regiments which later became famous for their service on the frontier. Major Wade was promoted to lieutenant colonel in the 10th Cavalry Regiment (United States) on March 20, 1879.

Wade left the buffalo soldiers with his promotion to colonel of the 5th Cavalry Regiment (United States) on April 21, 1887. He served ten years as the commander of this regiment before he was promoted to brigadier general, US Army on May 26, 1897. Wade was promoted to major general of volunteers on May 4, 1898. Two days later, he assumed command of the Third Army Corps at Camp Thomas, Chickamauga, Georgia. Following the armistice in August, he became a member of the Cuban Evacuation Committee to oversee the removal of Spanish forces from Cuba and Puerto Rico.

Wade then returned to his Regular Army rank and the command of the Department of Dakota. In 1901 he was placed in command of the Department of Southern Luzon in the Philippines, and on April 13, 1903 he was promoted to the permanent rank of major general and placed in command of the Division of the Philippines.

In 1904 he returned to the United States as commander of the Division of the Atlantic at Fort Jay on Governors Island in New York City. In his final posting, he was in charge of all U.S. Army posts and activity east of the Mississippi River, serving until his retirement on April 14, 1907, after 46 years of service.

General Wade was a companion of the Military Order of the Loyal Legion of the United States and was a member of the General Society of Colonial Wars.

== Family ==
Wade was the husband of Clara Lyon Wade (1843–1929). Their children included Major Benjamin Franklin Wade Jr. (1866–1953), Colonel John Parsons "Jack" Wade Sr. (1872–1942), and Clara Lyon Wade Crosby (1873–1954). B. F. Wade Jr. was the husband of Helen Naomi Thomas (1870–1948), whose father was Brigadier General Earl Dennison Thomas.

== Sources ==
- "James F. Wade". Fiddler's Green. Crossed Sabers. 2008-11-03.
- "James F. Wade Obit". Ashtabula County, OHGenWeb. 2005.
- Henry, Guy V. (1873). Military Record of Army and Civilian Appointments in the United States Army. Vol II. New York City: D. Van Nostrand, Publisher. pp. 350–351.
- War Department (1906). Official Army Register for 1907. Washington, D.C.: Government Printing Office. p. 5.
- War Department (1922). Official Army Register for 1922. Washington, D.C.: Government Printing Office. p. 1419.
