= First Battle of Saltville =

1864 battle of the American Civil War

Coordinates: 36.8857°N 81.7592°W

- Part of the American Civil War
Date	October 2, 1864 (161 years ago)
Location	Smyth County, Virginia
Result	Confederate victory

Belligerents
Confederate States	United States (Union)

Commanders and leaders
(Confederate States of America) Alfred E. Jackson	(United States) Stephen G. Burbridge

Units involved
8th Confederate Cavalry Regiment; Confederate Home Guard	5th U.S. Colored Cavalry Regiment

Strength
2,000	5,000

Casualties and losses
160	290
- Location in Virginia

The First Battle of Saltville, also known as the Saltville Massacre, was fought on October 2, 1864, near the town of Saltville, Virginia, during the American Civil War.

The battle over significant Confederate saltworks in town was fought by both regular and Home Guard Confederate units against regular U.S. Army troops, which included two of the few black cavalry units of the United States Colored Troops. Brigadier General Stephen G. Burbridge, commander of Federal forces in Kentucky, led the Union troops.

== Battle ==
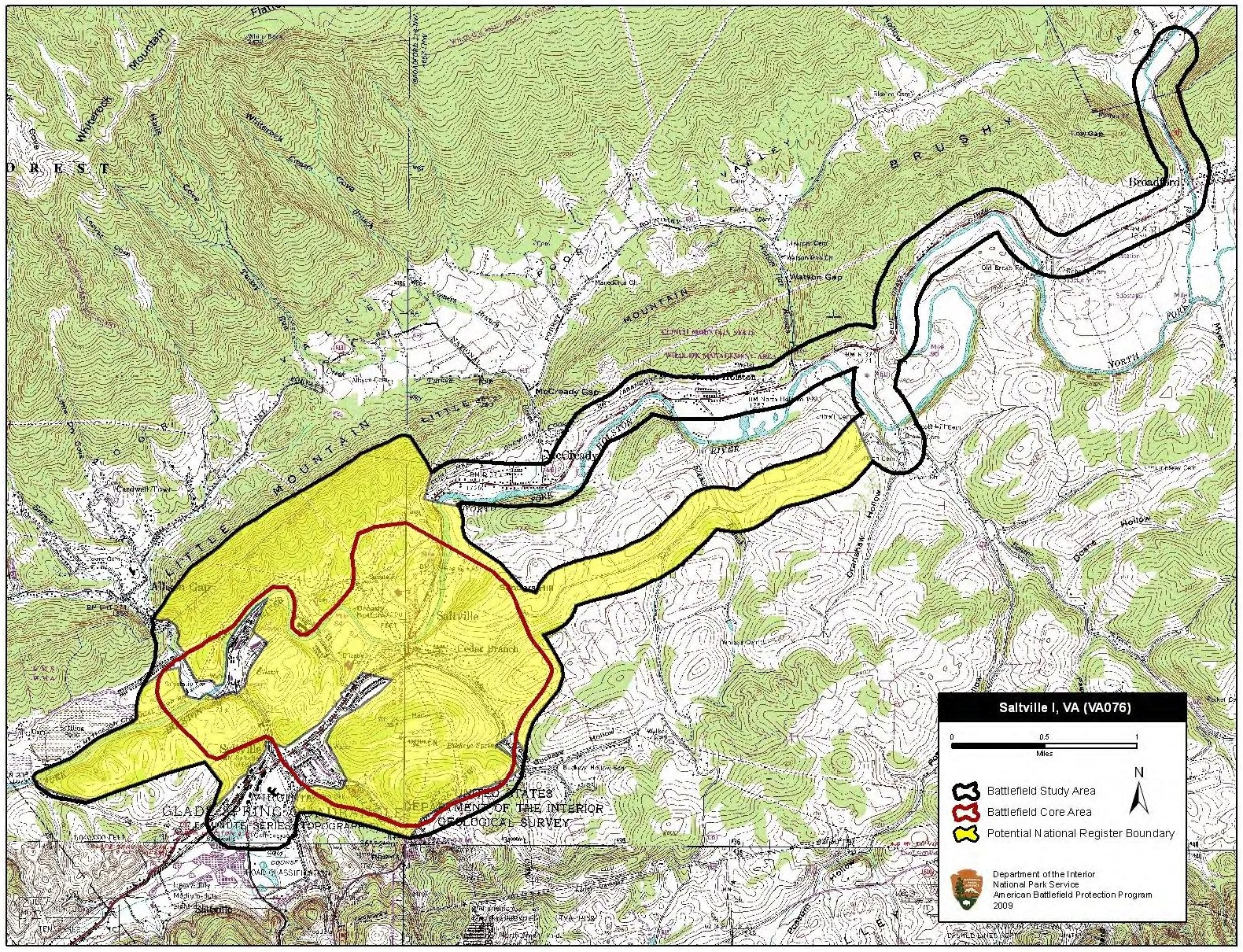
Battlefield core and study areas by the American Battlefield Protection Program

The battle was a Confederate victory. It has become known primarily for the Confederate massacre afterward of white and black wounded U.S. Army troops. Both Confederate soldiers and irregular guerrilla forces under the notorious Champ Ferguson murdered white and black U.S. Army soldiers on the battlefield and later some wounded who were being treated at the field hospital set up at nearby Emory and Henry College. A U.S. Army surgeon reported that between five and seven black soldiers and Elza Smith, a white lieutenant, were murdered at the hospital.

Confederate Brigadier General Felix Huston Robertson had bragged to another officer that "he had killed nearly all the Negroes." William C. Davis, in his book An Honorable Defeat. The Last Days of the Confederate Government (2001), says that Robertson personally "join(ed) in the act of villainy", although he escaped prosecution. When General Robert E. Lee learned of Robertson's conduct, he communicated to General John C. Breckinridge, Commander of the Department of East Tennessee and West Virginia, his dismay "that a general officer should have been guilty of the crime you mention" and instructed Breckinridge to "prefer charges against him and bring him to trial."

Estimates of the number of men massacred at Saltville vary, with most sources indicating around fifty casualties. Thomas Mays, in his book The Saltville Massacre (1995), argued that 46 U.S. Army soldiers were killed. An analysis of the National Archives records by Bryce Suderow, Phyllis Brown, and David Brown concluded that 45–50 members of the 5th and 6th U.S. Colored Cavalry Regiment (USCC) were murdered by Confederates. William Marvel had earlier analyzed the same records and concluded in 1991 that "Five black soldiers, wounded and helpless were definitely murdered at Saltville on October 3, and as many as seven more may have suffered the same fate there that day." The Confederates may have murdered as many as two dozen U.S. Army men.

== Aftermath ==
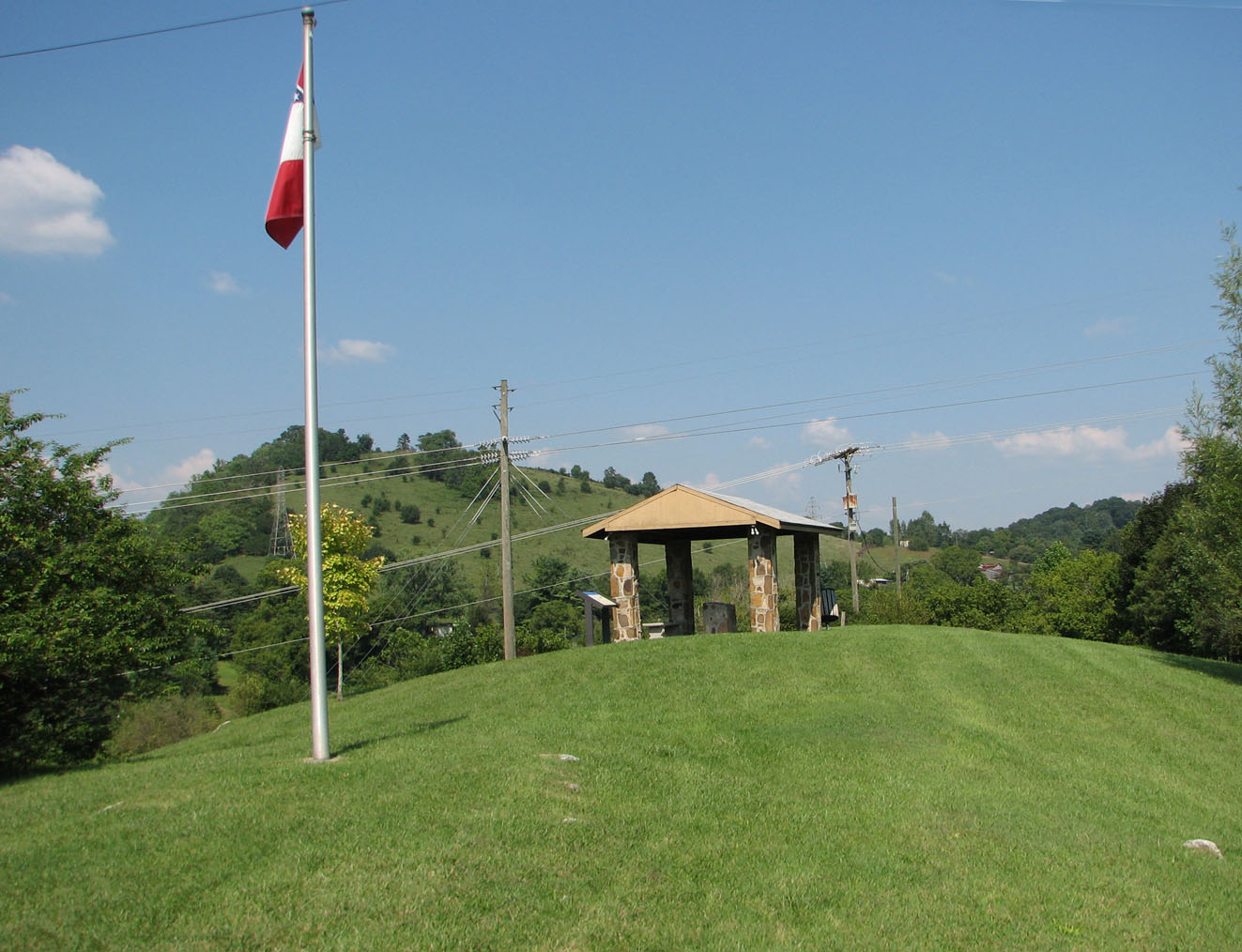
Saltville Battlefield in August 2006

The Second Battle of Saltville took place two months later at Saltville. Felix Huston Robertson was never tried for his role in the massacre. He died on April 20, 1928, at the age of 89. However, Champ Ferguson did stand trial immediately after the war. He was tried by a military court in Nashville, Tennessee, for this and other non-military killings. He was found guilty of 22 murders and sentenced to death by hanging. He was executed at the Tennessee State Prison on October 29, 1865.

== Battlefield preservation ==
The Civil War Trust (a division of the American Battlefield Trust) and its partners have acquired and preserved 107 acres (0.43 km^{2}) of the Saltville battlefields.
