= Virgil Young Cook =

Confederate military officer and planter (1848–1922)

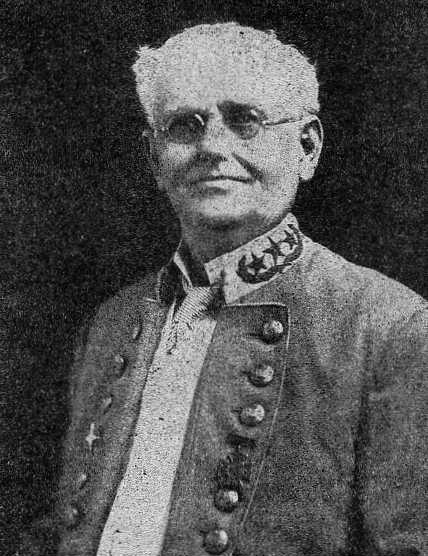
- Cook in a 1922 publication
- Born: November 14, 1848; Boydsville, Kentucky, U.S.
- Died: March 12, 1922 (aged 73); Batesville, Arkansas, U.S.
- Burial place: Oaklawn Cemetery
- Spouse(s): Mildred Ophelia Lamb (m. 1871; died 1916) Sarah B. Wyse (m. 1920)
- Children: 6
- Military career
- Allegiance: Confederate States (1863–1865); United States (1898–1899)
- Branch: Confederate States Army; United States Army
- Service years: 1863–1865; 1898–1899
- Rank: Colonel (United States)
- Units: 12th Kentucky Cavalry Regiment; 7th Kentucky Cavalry Regiment; 2nd Arkansas Volunteer Infantry Regiment
- Conflicts: American Civil War; Battle of Okolona; Battle of Paducah; Battle of Union City, Tennessee; Battle of Fort Pillow; Battle of Brice's Cross Roads; Battle of Tupelo; Franklin–Nashville campaign; Alabama campaign; Spanish–American War
- Other work: Planter

Virgil Young Cook (November 14, 1848 – March 12, 1922) was an American military officer from Kentucky. He served in the 12th Kentucky Cavalry Regiment and 7th Kentucky Cavalry Regiment of the Confederate States Army from 1863 to 1865. He later moved to Independence County, Arkansas, and became one of the largest landowners of that area by the time of his death. He was major general of the Arkansas National Guard and served in the Spanish-American War, but saw no action.

== Early life ==
Virgil Young Cook was born on November 14, 1848, in Boydsville, Kentucky, as the youngest child of five to Pernecia (née Dodds) and William D. Cook. His father was a merchant and tobaccoist. His maternal grandfather John Craig Dodds was a Kentucky militiaman who served in the War of 1812 and in the Indian Wars. Cook was educated in Boydsville and at Spring Hill Academy in Kentucky.

== Career ==
In July 1863, Cook enlisted with Company E of the 12th Kentucky Cavalry Regiment of the Confederate States Army. He was part of the battles of Okolona, Paducah, and the battle at Union City, Tennessee. He transferred to Company H of the 7th Kentucky Cavalry Regiment, the company commanded by C. W. Jetton and the brigade commanded by Edward Crossland. Both regiments he served in were under General Nathan Bedford Forrest. He was in the battles of Fort Pillow, Brice's Cross Roads, and Tupelo. He continued in raids in Alabama and Tennessee during the Franklin–Nashville campaign. He participated in General John Bell Hood's Nashville raid and was a courier for the staff of General Abraham Buford. In spring of 1865, he was present in the Alabama campaign and the battles at Monticello, Marion, Plantersville, Newhope Church, Bolger's Creek, and Selma. He was paroled at Gainesville, Alabama, in May 1865.

After the war, Cook spent a year in school. In June 1866, he moved to Arkansas and settled at Grand Glaize in Jackson County, Arkansas. He worked at Cox & Byers, merchants at Grand Glaize on a steamboat landing on the White River. He remained there until 1874. He then founded the town of Olyphant, a station on the Cairo & Fulton Railroad (later the Missouri Pacific Railroad) in Jackson County. He conducted a mercantile business for himself combining with the railroad station agency. In 1884, he moved to Elmo, Independence County, Arkansas. He continued his mercantile business and built a large cotton gin and corn mill. He later retired in 1907. Starting around 1874, he began acquired large bodies of land in Oil Trough Valley and on DePartee Creek. He moved to Batesville in 1907. He owned about 2,000 acres (810 ha) of river bottom farmland in Independence County. He also had real estate holdings in Batesville.

Cook was a Democrat. He attended every state convention from 1876 to the 1910s, except in 1898. He was a delegate to the 1880 Democratic National Convention. He was a member of the Tom Hindman Camp of the United Confederate Veterans (UCV) and served as its commander. He was also a member of the general finance committee of the UCV. He was adjutant general of the Arkansas division of UCV and as major general and aide-de-camp to Generals John R. Gordon, Stephen D. Lee, Clement A. Evans, and Clement A. Evans, all commanders of the national body. He was a member of the state board of Confederate pensions. He was also a member of the board of trustees of the University of Arkansas and as president of the Arkansas State Historical Society. He was appointed to the board of directors of the Confederate Veteran by its founding editor, Sumner Archibald Cunningham, who was a close friend.

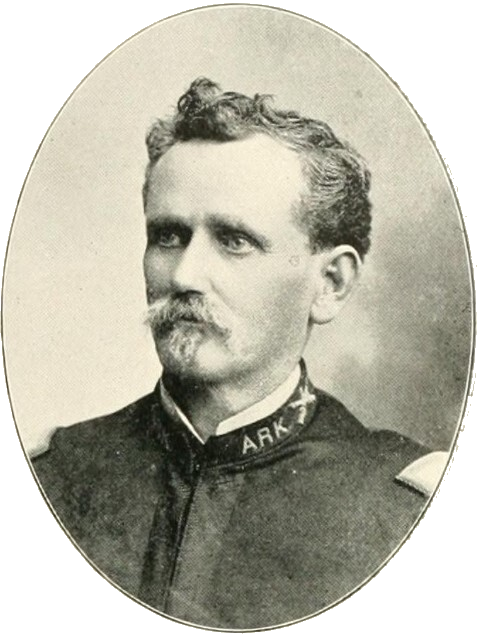
Cook in his U.S. Army uniform, c. 1902

Cook was major general of the Arkansas National Guard. During the Spanish–American War, he was appointed as colonel of the 2nd Arkansas United States Volunteer Infantry by Governor Daniel Webster Jones. He was senior colonel and was commander of brigades. He served as senior officer at Camp Shipp for ten days. He served with the regiment from April 25, 1898, to February 25, 1899. He "saw no active service".

== Personal life ==
Cook married twice. He first married Mildred Ophelia Lamb, daughter of Enos Lab, of Jacksonport on June 29, 1871. Her father was a steamboat captain on the Ohio and Mississippi rivers. They had two sons and four daughters, Neva, Virgil Whitefield, a son who died in infancy, Bertha May, Jennie, and Varina Davis. His wife died in 1916. He later married Sarah B. (née Lanier) Wyse of Forrest City on April 28, 1920. He had the Cook-Morrow House, a brick residence on Main Street in Batesville, built for his family in 1909. He was a member of the Methodist Church in Batesville.

Cook died of "acute indigestion" on March 12, 1922, at his home in Batesville. He was buried in Oaklawn Cemetery. He was the richest resident of Independence County by the time of his death.
