= Sam Davis House (Smyrna, Tennessee) =

Historic house in Tennessee, United States

- U.S. National Register of Historic Places
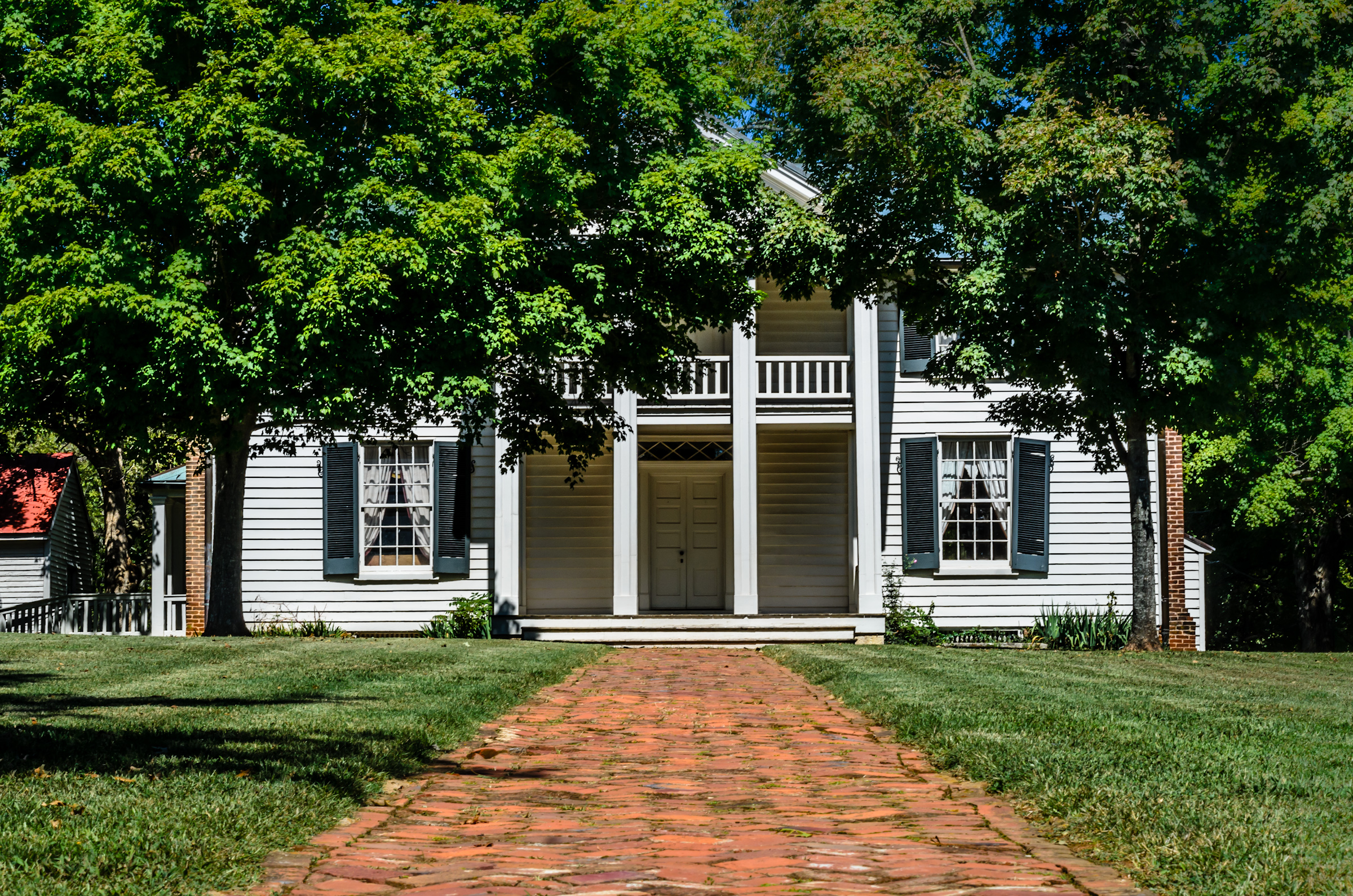
- The Sam Davis House in 2012

- Location within Tennessee Location within the United States
- Nearest city: Smyrna, Tennessee
- Area: 168 acres (68 ha)
- Built: 1810
- Architectural style: Greek Revival
- NRHP reference No.: 69000181
- Added to NRHP: December 23, 1969

The Sam Davis House (also known as the Sam Davis Home) is a historic house in Smyrna, Tennessee. It is now a museum to the memory of Confederate soldier Sam Davis.

== History ==
The house was first built as a log house in 1810, and remodelled by Charles Davis in 1847. His son, Sam Davis, who became known as the "Boy Hero of the Confederacy", grew up in this house.

The house was acquired by the State of Tennessee in 1927, and turned into a house museum for its association with Sam Davis by the Sam Davis Historical Association in 1930. Edith Pope, the second editor of the Confederate Veteran, donated an antique bed and clock as well as a large photograph of Sumner Archibald Cunningham to the museum.

== Architectural significance ==
The porch was designed in the Greek Revival architectural style. The house has been listed on the National Register of Historic Places since December 23, 1969.

== Notable events ==
The site hosts a yearly Victorian Halloween event along with seasonal ghost tours.

== Gallery ==
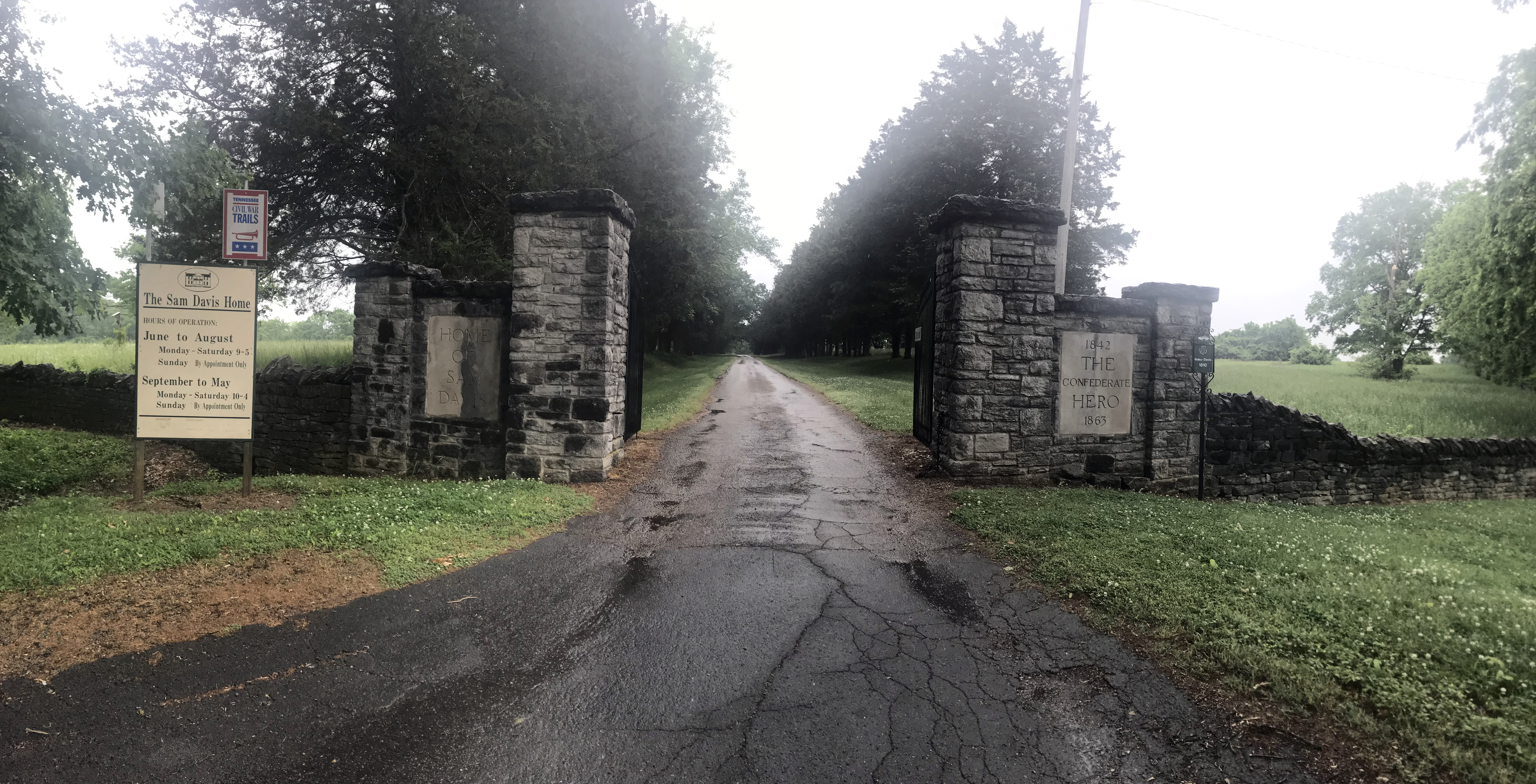
Entrance gate

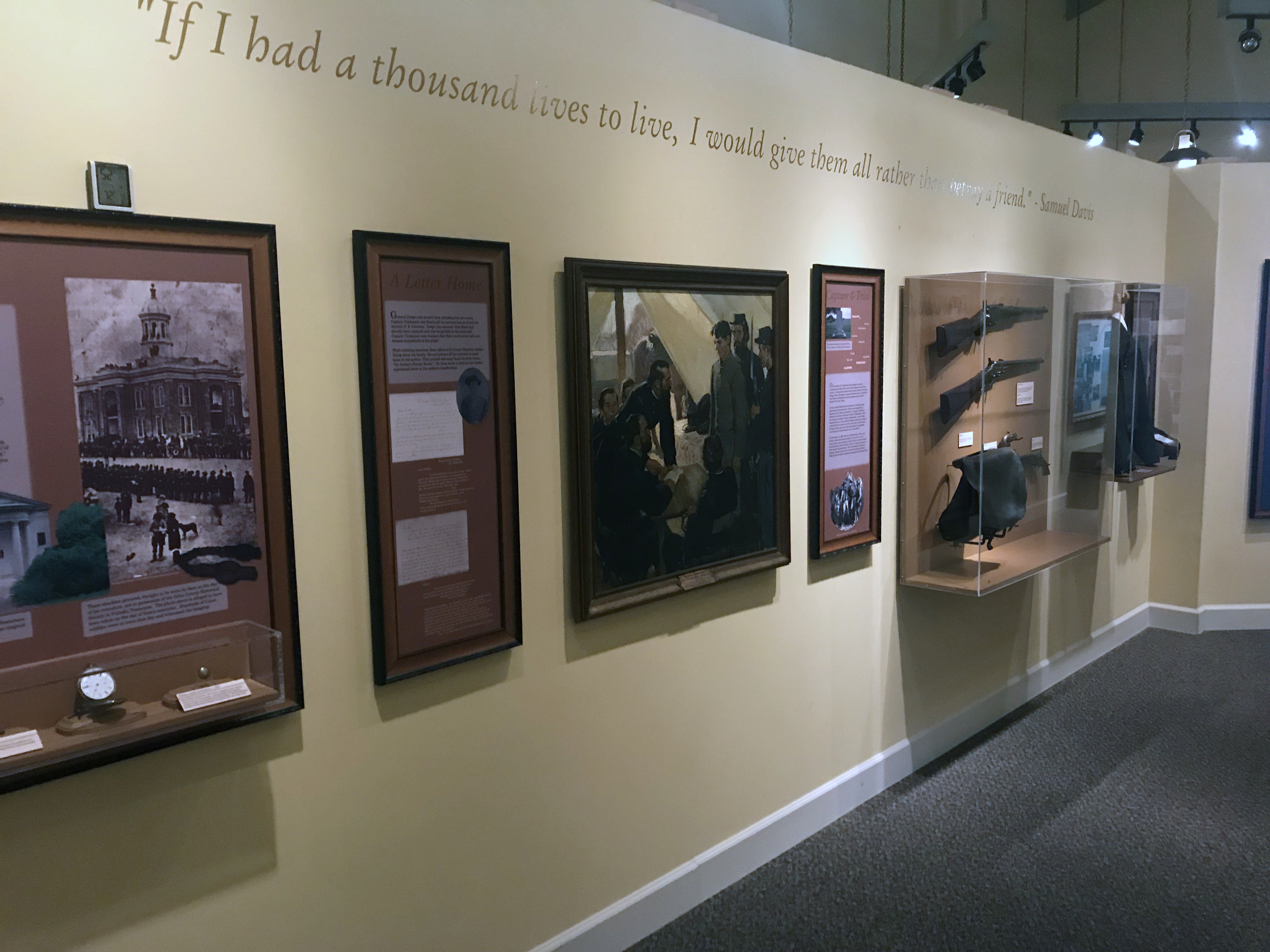
Interpretive exhibit displays

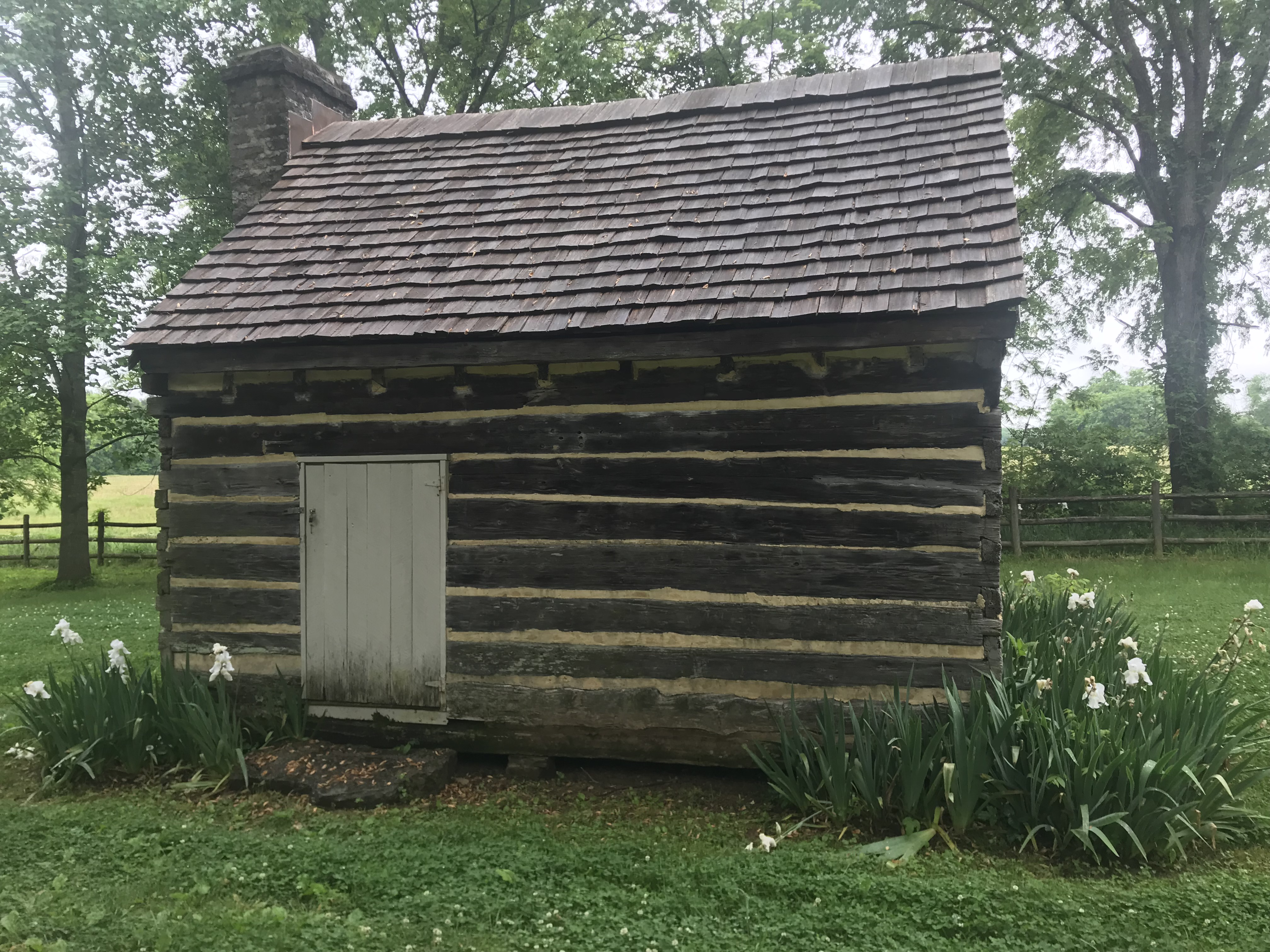
Slave Cabin
