= Tennessee Confederate Women's Monument =

1926 bronze statue in Nashville, Tennessee

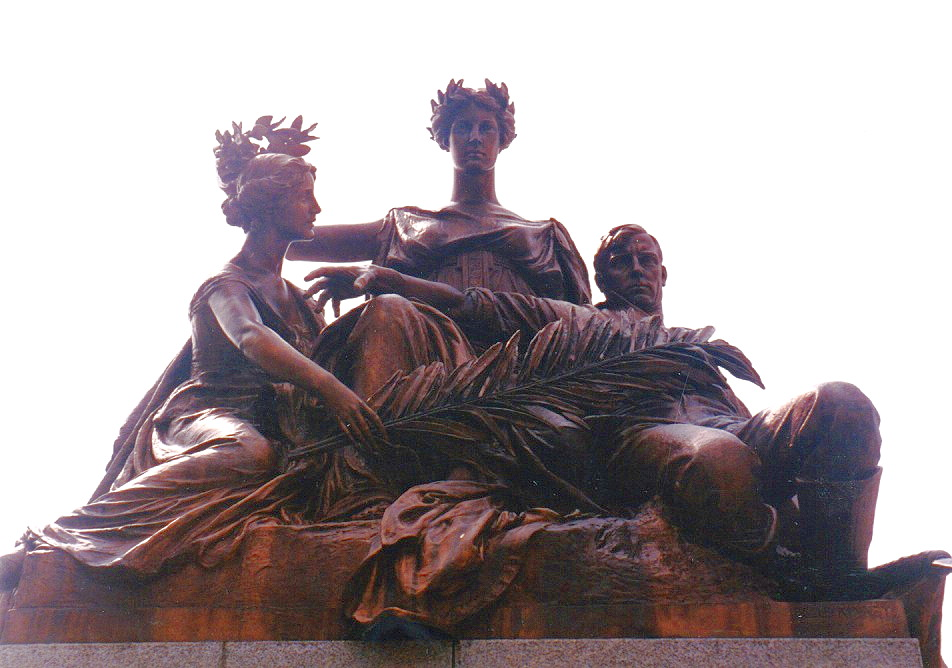
- Artist: Belle Kinney Scholz
- Completion date: 1926
- Movement: Bronze
- Subject: Representation of a Confederate woman, the Greek figure Fame, and a Confederate soldier
- Location: Nashville, Tennessee, United States

The Tennessee Confederate Women's Monument, also known as the Tennessee Monument to the Women of the Confederacy or the Monument to Southern Women in War Times, is a bronze statue on the grounds of Legislative Plaza near the Tennessee State Capitol in Nashville, Tennessee, USA.

The Tennessee Confederate Women’s Monument commemorates the efforts of southern women in the United States Civil War. It depicts a typical southern woman aiding a Confederate soldier. An allegory of Fame places a laurel wreath on top of the woman's head. This monument was erected by the United Confederate Veterans (UCV) on behalf of female ancestors whom they regarded as having embodied Confederate ideals.

In 1909, the UCV proposed placing a women’s monument in every former Confederate state. After much controversy over the design for the monument, the Tennessean sculptor Belle Kinney was commissioned for the project in 1910.

Kinney’s Confederate Women’s Monument was dedicated in Tennessee at a ceremony on October 10, 1926. It is located on Legislative Plaza adjacent to the War Memorial Building. Another version also stands in Mississippi.

== Kinney and the Confederacy ==
Belle Kinney was born in Nashville in 1890. She studied and worked at the Art Institute of Chicago, then resettled in New York. Between 1900-1930, Kinney created her most significant works, including the Confederate Women’s Monument for the states of Tennessee and Mississippi.

The art historian Elise L. Smith argues that Kinney’s Southern roots helped her secure the commission, as did her commitment to Confederate ideals and gender norms. Kinney designed another sculpture for the Tennessee War Memorial Building with her husband Leopold Scholz to commemorate the conclusion of World War One. In various interviews regarding her works for Tennessee, Kinney described war as a “glorified struggle for high ideals.” She later stated that “no ideal in all the world is superior to… the high spiritual ideal the American man feels for the American woman.” Smith quotes writer Blanche Scott Jackson of Holland’s Magazine of the South (1935) to summarize Kinney’s relationship to her Southern ideals. Jackson states that Kinney had “the charm and graciousness of a gentlewoman of the Old South combined with the poise and freedom of the best of the new.” These attributes, Smith argues, made Kinney an appealing candidate to design a monument to the Confederacy.

== Motivation to erect a women's monument ==
In 1881, Jefferson Davis dedicated his book The Rise and Fall of the Confederate Government to “The Women of the Confederacy.” His work attempted to reframe the ideals of the Confederate cause, building on the myth of the Lost Cause by introducing the idea of the Southern Gentleman. Historians Cynthia Mills and Pamela H. Simpson describe Davis’s work as a “building block in postwar construction of the Lost Cause narrative.” Mills and Smith describe Confederate Women’s Monuments as a product of this same context, arguing that the monuments were meant to combat “‘false’ history about southern gender relations” as well as “‘false’ northern arguments” that the Civil War was fought over slavery. Mills and Simpson explain how these monuments were political statements that attempted to re-establish the Confederate ideals. They argue that these monuments, under the disguise of commemorating women, diverted attention from the claims made against the Confederacy.

Historian Suzanne Woolley Smith interprets the Tennessee Women's Monument in similar terms, arguing that the work was shaped by Southerners who recalled the Confederacy as “a golden agrarian period peopled by aristocratic planter families and their contented slaves.” Building on the work of the historian Gaines Foster, she describes “the predominance of women in these commemorative activities as a way of de-emphasizing the political significance of the loss, focusing instead on the affective ramifications– steering post-war activities into the feminine realm of sentiment in order to lessen the shock of the defeat.”

== UDC opposition to a women's monument ==
The United Daughters of the Confederacy (UDC) was founded as an organization for young women to support the Confederacy. When it was first established, the UDC primarily raised awareness of Confederate values, tended to needy veterans, and helped maintain cemeteries. When veterans’ campaigns initially proposed a monument to women in 1909, there was pushback from the UDC. Historian Thomas J. Brown explains that the UDC was suspicious of C. Irvine Walker, who led the planning for the monument. Walker's suggestion of a female sculptor for the project may have been designed to placate the organization, but members of the UDC described his praise of Belle Kinney merely as evidence that he was "susceptible to a winning smile and pleasant manner!’”

One female Confederate protester, quoted by the scholar Elise L. Smith, stated that she favored a “living” monument as opposed to an “insensate stone or pulseless clay.” Such women believed that the money for the monument would be better spent to actually support the women of the Confederacy rather than celebrate them. Some suggested that the money should be used to help support women’s universities, clubs, or orphanages.

In response to the feelings of the UDC, the United Confederate Veterans (UCV) and the Sons of Confederate Veterans defended the idea of a traditional bronze monument. They claimed that they could not raise enough money to follow through with the other suggestions the UDC had provided. Historians Cynthia Mills and Pamela H. Simpson explain how these male, Confederate groups believed that “monuments, if substantially built, would after erection require no further outlaw of money.” Furthermore, the UCV and the Sons of Confederate Veterans claimed that a statue was more sustainable than the UDC's suggestions.

== Controversy over the design ==
The monument was first suggested by Sumner Archibald Cunningham, the editor of Confederate Veteran, in 1894. However, once the design had been drawn, he objected to it, opining that it failed to convey "the divine qualities of southern womanhood."

In 1909, Confederate veteran C. Irvine Walker, a leader of the United Confederate Veterans (UCV), officially proposed that there be a monument in each southern state commemorating the efforts of women in the United States Civil War. The artist was to be paid $25,000. The money to fund the monument would be raised by the UCV and the Sons of Confederate Veterans association.

In 1907, after years of fundraising and a failed competition in which almost one hundred designs were rejected, Walker endorsed sculptor Louis Amateis. Amateis’s design showed a woman in classical dress with one hand holding a Confederate flag and the other confidently gripping a sword. The inscription beneath this proposed women’s monument read: “uphold our state’s rights.” This design was not well received. One critic stated that this “design completely missed the point” of what the UCV had intended. Another critic stated that Amateis’s depiction of a southern woman had “not a line of womanly grace or modesty or tenderness…not a hint of the dear home keeper of the Southland, not a reminder of the patient, self-sacrificing, unwearied helper and comforter of the boys in gray.” As a result, the UCV abandoned Amateis’s design and turned to Kinney.^{188-189}

Kinney’s design still stands today in Tennessee and Mississippi, but the monument today is not an exact replica of her design that was chosen in 1910. While it cannot be confirmed what prompted the alterations to Kinney's original design, protests against the design likely contributed to the decision. In 1911, Mrs. George H. Tichenor, a United Daughter of the Confederacy from New Orleans, protested against Kinney’s original design in a letter addressed to the presidents of the United Daughters of the Confederacy (UDC) as well as the chief of staff of the New Orleans chapter of the UCV. Tichenor stated that he was not against the “chivalrous complement of the Confederate Veterans to the Woman of their glorious Past.” Unlike other protestors, Tichenor appreciated the UCV’s proposal to erect a statue commemorating women. His argument was instead against Kinney’s design specifically. Tichenor argued that placing Kinney’s monument in all of the southern states would be “stamping a false conception of our Mothers on the youth of the South.” He disliked the way the monument represented her female, southern ancestors. He argued that the monument did not embody his southern ancestors' courage. Tichenor believed that the monument displayed a false “timid shrinking” and “fearfulness of spirit” that was not representative of southern women. Elise Smith explains how Tichenor’s feelings culminated later that year when he and others protested the design at a UDC convention in Little Rock. ^{20-22}

== Alterations to Kinney's Original Design ==
The designs presented in Mississippi in 1912 and in Tennessee in 1926 were different from the design Kinney initially proposed. Elise Smith describes the modified version as less “utterly passive” and “more strongly active and open” than the original.^{20} The young southern woman's head is less “downcast” than the original, making her appear more confident and less submissive. The gazes of Fame and the Confederate soldier were altered to be looking outward instead of down, contributing to the openness of the new design. The figure of Fame was adjusted in the new design so that both of her shoulders are covered by her garment. Smith believes that this slight alteration made the figure more “demure” and “less sensual.” These modifications to Kinney’s design were slight and many protestors still disliked Kinney’s revised design. But, Smith argues, these changes offset protestors' complaints enough so that the UCV could continue to erect the monument.

== Presentation Ceremony ==
The Tennessee monument was erected on Sunday October 10, 1926 on the grounds of the capitol in Nashville. The presentation ceremony was supposed to be held outside, but due to rain, only the actual unveiling of the monument took place outside. Tennessee and Confederate representatives were present at the unveiling. Kinney, who was working in New York on other commissions for the state of Tennessee, did not attend.

Reverend James I. Vance, the pastor of the First Presbyterian Church, delivered an introductory prayer.

An article from the Nashville Banner in 1926 quotes Tennessee Governor Austin Peay's speech from the day. Peay spoke on behalf of the 1915 legislature that provided the funds for the monument. Peay explained how the Confederate soldiers “waged no foreign war; his battles were fought around the very doorsteps of the South.” He went on to praise the women who supported their husbands and families during the war in the ways that they could.

Kinney was frequently praised at the event. Governor Peay referred to Kinney as “a brilliant and gifted daughter of the South.” The Nashville Banner described her as “the most outstanding living Tennessee woman” in the field of art.

The state commander of the Sons of Confederate Veterans, J.L. Highsaw of Memphis, Tennessee, also spoke at the monument's presentation ceremony. He claimed that this celebration paid a “fitting tribute to the most stout-hearted and valiant women whom the world has ever known” and not to the women of the lost cause, “for there was no lost cause, as historians and speakers of the past would have you believe.” He expressed his hopes that this monument and others, along with continued Confederate sentiment, would “establish in this Western hemisphere the eternal truth of freedom and local self-government as written by the fathers of that immortal charter of constitutional freedom.”

== Description ==
The casts that formed the bronze monuments in Tennessee and Mississippi were made by Tiffany Studios in New York City in 1917.

Today, the monument still stands on a ten-foot-tall marble base. The sides of the base are carved with four phrases: “Our mothers,” “Our Wives,” “Our Daughters,” and “Our sisters.” The reference to “our mothers” is on the front face of the marble base and “our sisters” is carved on the back. Elise L. Smith explains how the mothers are referenced on the front because the UCV hoped to commemorate them first. Smith wonders if sisters are referenced on the back because they are “the relatives least emotionally connected.”

The plaque for the monument, given by Tennessee’s Historical Commission, reads, “Erected by the State of Tennessee to commemorate the heroic action of the women of Tennessee during the War Between the States. Dedicated October 10, 1926, Belle Kinney Sculptor.”

== Symbolism ==
Thomas Brown states that the commissioners hoped Kinney's sculpture would celebrate the “typical gentle woman” that served the Confederacy during the war. Brown explains how the “typical” Confederate woman would have been “called from the ballroom” to serve the Confederacy with poise and humility. Elise L. Smith further notes that organizers of the monument regarded the "typical" southern woman as "loyal, devoted, innocent, suffering, self-sacrificing, self-forgetful, and unconscious of fame.”

Kinney’s monument depicts an allegory of Fame, a Southern woman, and a Confederate soldier. Fame, the central figure, is clothed in robes meant to evoke ancient Greek culture. She is shown placing a crown of laurel upon the head of the southern woman with her right arm, celebrating the accomplishments of the Confederate woman.

The Confederate woman is shown extending a palm branch to the Confederate soldier to her left. Palm branches reference the Greek goddess of victory who typically bestowed these branches upon olympic athletes who were victorious. The inclusion of this symbol suggests that the cause this soldier died for was worthwhile. Fame’s left arm additionally supports the dying Confederate, reinforcing the idea that this man died honorably.

Smith argues that configuration of the figures contains symbolic significance. The Confederate woman reaching with a palm branch for the dying soldier forms a "V" shape that Smith describes as a emphasizing the physical and social support of the women to the Confederate cause. This V structure suggests “what was seen as women's proper role as supporter and commemorator of man’s actions.”

According to Smith, the mood of this monument is “somber,” as if it mourns the cause it stands for in addition to commemorating it. Smith describes it as a “profoundly moving elegy.” She claims it represents “grace in defeat” and the “women’s power to endure” the hardships of the war. Mills and Simpson similarly explain that while the monument acknowledges the Confederate loss in the war, it uplifts the underlying cause the Confederates fought for. They note that three figures' heads are bowed, the soldier is depicted in a slumped posture, and the flag at his side is partially rolled. Smith observes that the flag in the soldier's hands demonstrates that he is “triumphant even in death.”

== Reception ==
Despite these changes made to Kinney’s original design, the version of the monument erected remained a topic of controversy. According to Smith, critics disliked the monument's youthful depiction of a southern woman. Smith explains how protestors viewed Kinney’s monument as a sexualized representation of their female ancestors. While Kinney’s design had the “youthful beauty and pure, virginal air often described by the men of the South,” the most “praiseworthy” role of Confederate female ancestors, that they wished to immortalize, was the role of the mother.

The Confederate value of motherhood was also reflected in a Nashville Banner article from October 11, 1926. The article quotes from author Virginia Frazer Boyle’s poem which she presented at the dedication ceremony for the monument the previous day. In this poem, Boyle personifies Tennessee, comparing the state to a mother figure with “a Spartan hope” who “wears the scars for the manhood of Tennessee.”

Smith explains how commentators from the time struggled to find this vision of motherhood in Kinney’s design. She writes that the women’s monuments chosen for the remaining states, in the place of Kinney’s, “specifically addressed the issue of motherhood by giving visual expression to the maternal ideal.” Smith suggests that Kinney’s monument might not have been positively received by all the southern states because of its failure to incorporate themes of motherhood.

Thomas Brown states that critics disliked Kinney’s final design because of its “sexually charged portrait of the Confederate woman.” Brown quotes a critic who states: "we do not consider appropriate, the representation of the Southern woman of the Confederacy as a beautiful girl of 20 or 22, appearing in a costume with low neck and short sleeves, and we cannot determine whether expression of exquisite sadness is on account of the soldier or the fact that the only covering for her unquestionably beautifully shapely legs is a misty, gauzy something that would give Comstock the horrors. She is magnificent, but she's not the woman of war." Brown quotes another critic who refers to Kinney’s model of Fame as “amazonian” due to its “large, bold features…massive form” and “brawny neck.”

== Legacy ==
According to Mills and Simpson, the press believed Kinney’s sculpture to be the “largest contract for sculpture ever awarded to a woman” at the time it was erected.

The environment surrounding the monument today has altered its meaning. Woolley Smith explains how the monument has been absorbed into the “sunken garden” of what is now known as the Tennessee Vietnam Veterans Memorial Plaza. Because of its placement next to another war’s memorial, the Tennessee Confederate Women’s Monument is “totally disconnected from its surroundings.” Woolley Smith believes that because the monument is out place within its surroundings, it has “unfortunately lost most of its meaning.” Woolley Smith argues that even the “allegorical symbolism is lost on the modern viewer,” as Greek mythology has become less of common knowledge in our world today.
