= Confederate memorial =

Confederate memorial may refer to

- The former Confederate Memorial Home, renamed Confederate Memorial Hall, in Washington, D.C.
- The Confederate Memorial Hall Museum, in New Orleans, Louisiana
- The former Confederate Memorial Hall, now Memorial Hall, Vanderbilt University, Nashville, Tennessee
- Any of the thousands of Confederate monuments which exist in the United States (see List of Confederate monuments and memorials)
- Any of a growing list of removed Confederate monuments (see Removal of Confederate monuments and memorials)
