= John Pope House =

John Pope House may refer to:

- John Pope House (Springfield, Kentucky), listed on the National Register of Historic Places in Washington County, Kentucky
- John Pope House (Burwood, Tennessee), listed on the National Register of Historic Places in Williamson County, Tennessee
