= James Rains =

James Rains may refer to:

- James Edwards Rains (1833–1862), Confederate States Army officer who served in Tennessee and Kentucky
- James S. Rains (1817–1880), Missouri State Guard officer who served in Arkansas and Missouri
