= Association of Confederate Soldiers =

The Association of Confederate Soldiers (Tennessee Division) was an organization formed by veterans of the American Civil War in 1887, and helped to form the United Confederate Veterans in 1889.

Dr. Joseph Jones served as the association's surgeon general and helped sponsor efforts in 1890 to archive and maintain Confederate army medical records.

== History ==
The organization was founded in November 1885 as the Tennessee Confederate Memorial and Historical Association. In 1887 they renamed the organization, the Association of Confederate Soldiers, with individual camps (formally called Bivouacs) named in honor of former Confederate notables, including Tennessee generals James E. Rains and Frank Cheatham.

The Original Nashville Camp was named Frank Cheatham Bivouac #1 and they held monthly meetings in Nashville’s Pythian Hall.

In 1889, the organization successfully sponsored legislation in Tennessee to provide funding for the Confederate Soldiers' Home and Cemetery. The building opened in 1892, and was managed by a board of fifteen trustees, (six of whom were women). Each served until death or resignation, when his or her successor was appointed by the Governor of Tennessee upon the recommendation of the Association of Confederate Soldiers. The home closed in 1941.

Also in 1889, The Association of Confederate Soldiers affiliated with the United Confederate Veterans and the ACS bivouacs then became UCV camps. Many are still active today as SCV camps in the Sons of Confederate Veterans.
