= John Pope House (Burwood, Tennessee) =

Historic house in Tennessee, United States

- U.S. National Register of Historic Places
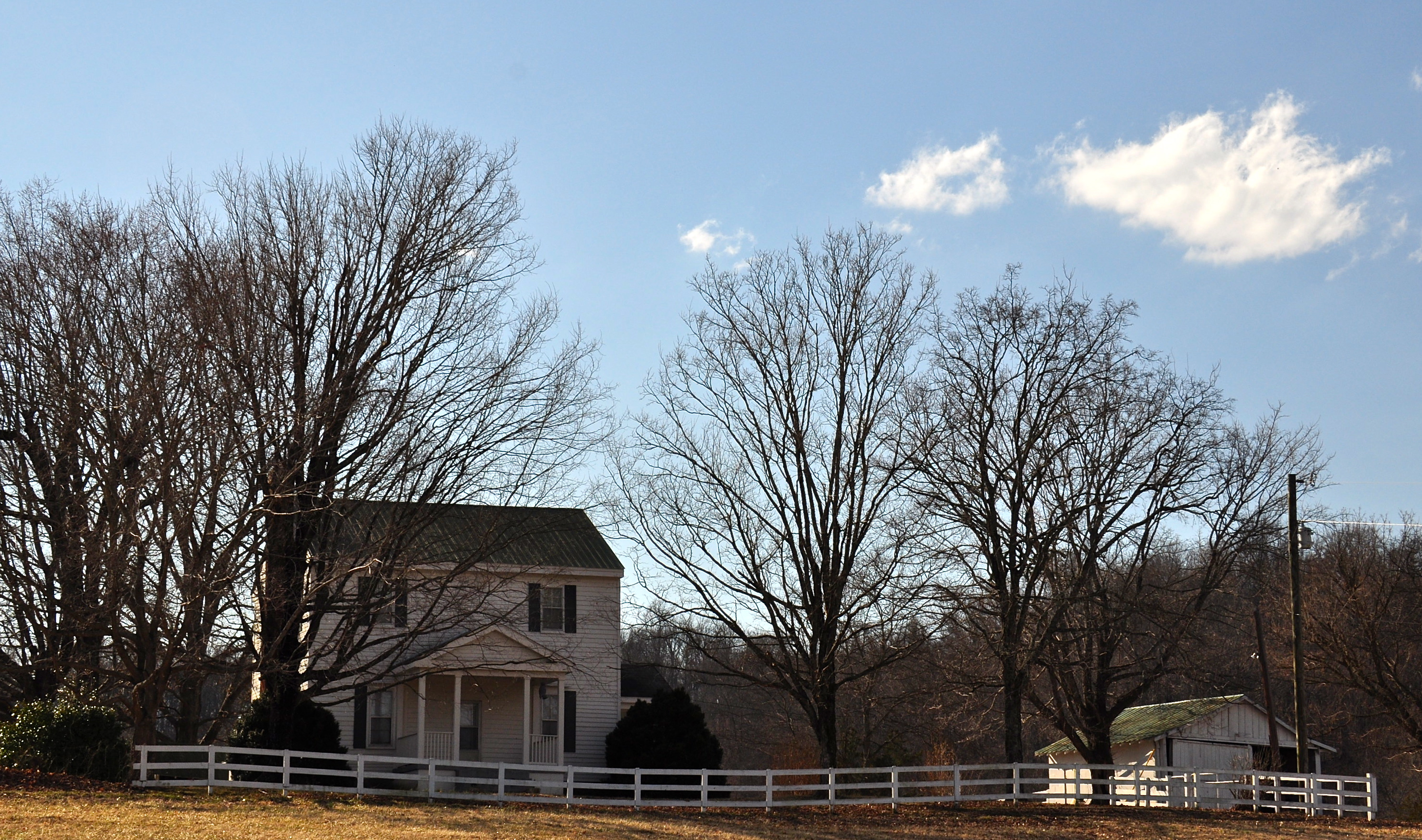
- John Pope House, February 2014

- Location within Tennessee Location within the United States
- Location: Pope Chapel Rd., Burwood, Tennessee
- Coordinates: 35°47′56″N 86°58′41″W
- Area: 1.8 acres (0.73 ha)
- Built: c. 1806
- Architectural style: Hall-parlor plan architecture; single pen architecture
- MPS: Williamson County MRA
- NRHP reference No.: 88000338
- Added to NRHP: April 13, 1988

The John Pope House, also known as Eastview, is a historic plantation house in Burwood, Williamson County, Tennessee. It incorporates hall-parlor plan architecture and single pen architecture.

== History ==
The original part of the house was built of logs circa 1806 by slaves for Reverend John C. Pope, a veteran of the American Revolutionary War and a lay Methodist minister. Originally it "was one of the more ornate log residences built during this period in the county with wainscoting, chair rails and plaster walls." Pope conducted well-attended camp meetings at locations around the area. He owned 2,200 acres by 1805, and 37 slaves by 1820. He deeded land for the construction of a chapel nearby in 1818. He was married twice, and he had 15 children. His granddaughter, Edith Pope, was the president of the Nashville No. 1 chapter of the United Daughters of the Confederacy and second editor of the Confederate Veteran.

The house has exterior brick chimneys and a standing metal seam gable roof and rests on a stone foundation. It was modified c.1880 with addition of weatherboard and with replacement/addition of four-over-four sash windows. In c.1920 a multi-light entrance doorway and a one-story frame addition to the rear were added. The addition gained metal siding c.1940. The main (east) facade gained, c.1950, a one-story gable roof porch with square Doric columns and square baluster railing; a similar porch has also been added to the north facade.

Its interior includes original Federal-style mantels on its second floor. As of 1988 the house sat "on a hillside on a several hundred acre farm and retains its original site and setting."

The house was listed on the National Register of Historic Places in 1988. When listed the property included one contributing building and one non-contributing structure, on 1.8 acres (0.73 ha). The property was covered in a 1988 study of Williamson County historical resources.
