= Edith D. Pope =

American editor

Edith Drake Pope
- Born: 1869; Williamson County, Tennessee, U.S.
- Died: January 27, 1947 (aged 77–78); Williamson County, Tennessee, U.S.
- Education: Tennessee Female College
- Occupation: Editor
- Parent(s): William Campbell Pope; Mary Caroline Drake

Edith D. Pope (1869 – 1947) was an American editor. She was the second editor of the Confederate Veteran from 1914 to 1932, and the president of the Nashville No. 1 chapter of the United Daughters of the Confederacy from 1927 to 1930. She played a critical role in the promotion of the Lost Cause of the Confederacy.

== Early life ==
Edith Drake Pope was born in 1869 to a former slaveholding family. She grew up in Williamson County, "less than one mile" from the John Pope House in Burwood, Tennessee, built by her paternal great-grandfather. Her father, William Campbell Pope, served in the Confederate States Army during the American Civil War of 1861–1865. She had two brothers and three sisters.

Pope graduated from the (now defunct) Tennessee Female College in Franklin, Tennessee, in 1888.

== Career ==
Pope began her career as Sumner Archibald Cunningham's secretary; Cunningham was the founder and editor of the Confederate Veteran, a monthly magazine about veterans of the Confederate States Army. When he died in December 1913, she became its editor until her retirement in 1932. In a 1927 edition of the magazine, she refuted William Mack Lee's false claim that he was a body servant to General Robert E. Lee during the American Civil War.

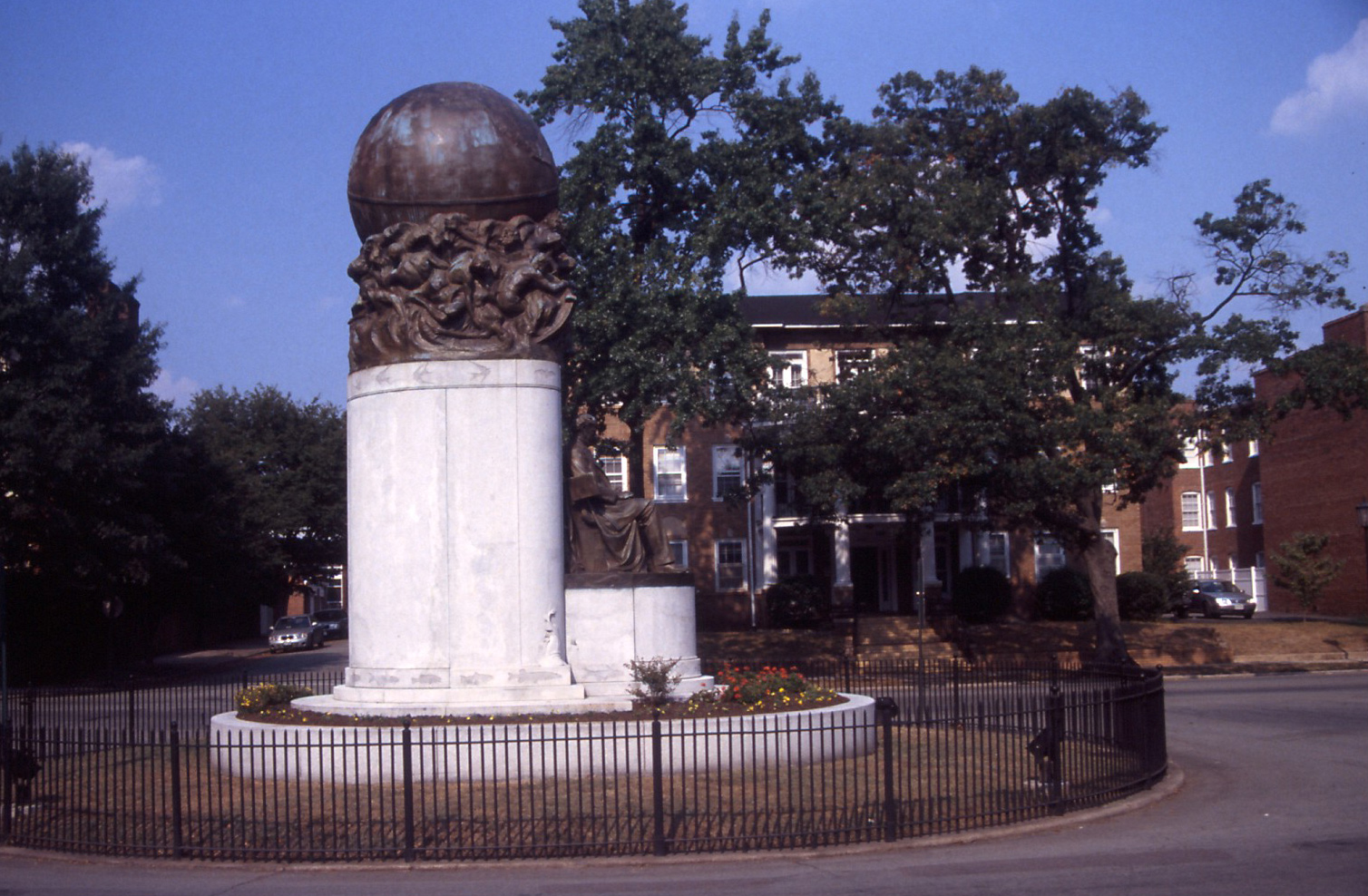
Matthew Fontaine Maury Monument

Pope was an active member of the United Daughters of the Confederacy. She was the president of the Nashville No. 1 chapter from 1927 to 1930, and its recording secretary from 1930 to 1935. She helped install the Matthew Fontaine Maury Monument in Richmond, Virginia, and the Tennessee Confederate Women's Monument in Nashville. She was also a member of the Confederate Memorial Literary Society, which established the Museum of the Confederacy in Richmond; it was later renamed the American Civil War Museum.

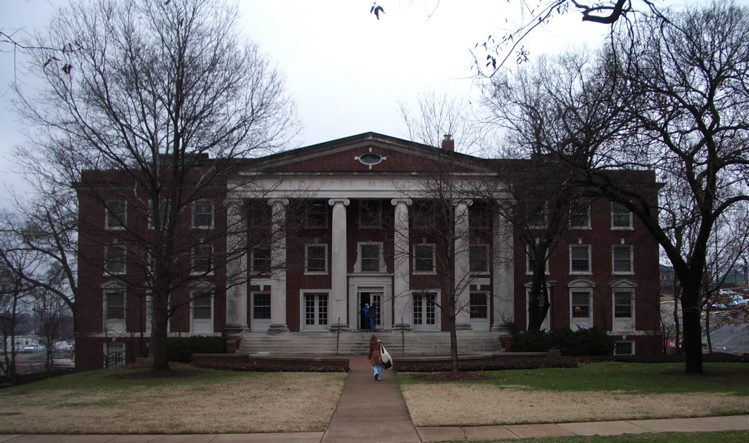
Confederate Memorial Hall at Vanderbilt University.

Pope also played a key role in the construction of Confederate Memorial Hall at Peabody College (now Vanderbilt University) in Nashville, where she made sure the college would also teach a course on Southern history.

Pope supported the Ku Klux Klan and Jim Crow laws. She was a proponent of the "repatriation" of African-American United States citizens to Africa, and she was nostalgic about the American Colonization Society.

== Personal life and death ==
Pope resided in the West End neighborhood of Nashville, next to Centennial Park and Vanderbilt University.

Pope died on January 27, 1947, in Burwood, Tennessee.
