= Memorial Hall, Vanderbilt University =

Coordinates: 36.1407°N 86.7978°W

Memorial Hall
- Confederate Memorial Hall
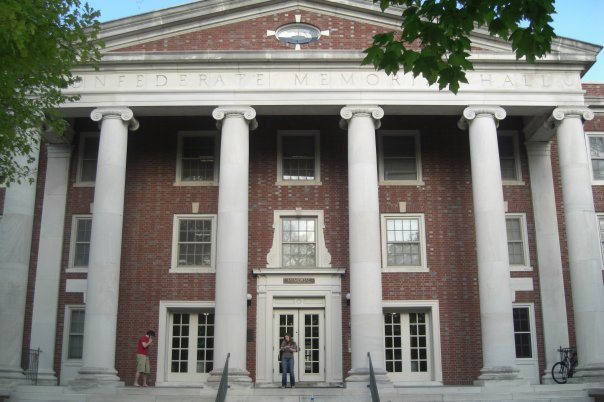
- Memorial Hall in 2007 (then known as Confederate Memorial Hall)
- Interactive map of the Memorial Hall area

General information
- Location: Nashville, United States
- Completed: 1935
- Owner: Vanderbilt University

Design and construction
- Architect: Henry C. Hibbs

Memorial Hall (formerly known as Confederate Memorial Hall) is a historic building on the Peabody College campus of Vanderbilt University in Nashville, Tennessee. It was built in 1935 as a dormitory hall for female descendants of Confederate States Army veterans. Its former name resulted in multiple lawsuits and student unrest. In August 2016, Vanderbilt announced it would reimburse the United Daughters of the Confederacy for their financial contribution and remove the word Confederate from the building.

== History ==
The project was initiated by the United Daughters of the Confederacy (UDC) as early as the mid-1890s and was supported by Peabody College president James D. Porter, a Confederate veteran and former Tennessee governor, in 1902. Edith D. Pope, the second editor of the Confederate Veteran and a leading member of the Nashville No. 1 chapter of the UDC, played a key role in its construction. In addition, Pope and other members of the UDC made sure the college would offer a course on Southern history.

The construction of Confederate Memorial Hall was supported by a $50,000 donation from the UDC in 1933. The total cost of construction was $140,000. The building was completed in 1935. It was used as a residential building by female descendants of Confederate veterans who were selected by the UDC to live free of charge while they studied education.

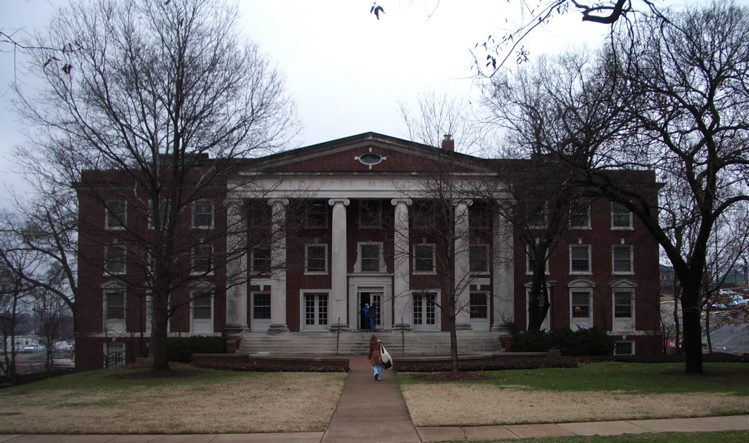
Memorial Hall in 2006

The building became part of Vanderbilt University campus in 1979 when the university acquired Peabody College. By 1988, students were holding protests on campus, arguing the building's name was offensive to black students. As a result, the university added a memorial plaque near the building to contextualize the origin of the name.

When Gordon Gee became Chancellor in 2002, he tried to change the name of the building. However, the United Daughters of the Confederacy sued the university in the Davidson County Chancery Court. The case went to the Tennessee Supreme Court, and Judge William C. Koch, Jr. sided with the UDC. By 2005, Judge William B. Cain of the Tennessee Court of Appeals concluded that the word Confederate was not about slavery, but about the fallen soldiers of the Confederate States Army, who defended their land against Northern invaders. When he suggested Vanderbilt University would have to repay the UDC for their $50,000 donation (adjusted to inflation), the university dropped the lawsuit. However, the university used the name "Memorial Hall" in their publications.

In November 2015, students asked Chancellor Nicholas Zeppos to change the name on the building, arguing that "Vanderbilt refuses to pay $1 million to the Daughters of the Confederacy to divorce this university from its 'racist' past but raised $10 million to renovate campus baseball facilities".

On August 15, 2016, the university announced it would remove the word Confederate from the building after receiving an anonymous donation of $1.2 million to repay the United Daughters of the Confederacy. The UDC "reluctantly" accepted the donation. Meanwhile, the university hid the word Confederate with a "temporary covering".

Alumnus Clay Travis, a Fox Sports journalist, criticized his alma mater's decision to remove the word Confederate, comparing them to "Middle Eastern terrorists". In response, Jack Daniel's canceled a $3,000 promotion deal it had with Travis.

== See also ==
- List of Confederate monuments and memorials
- Removal of Confederate monuments and memorials
