= 12th Kentucky Cavalry Regiment =

- Active: November 17, 1862 - August 23, 1865
- Country: United States
- Allegiance: Union
- Branch: Cavalry
- Engagements: Knoxville Campaign; Atlanta campaign Battle of Resaca; Battle of Kennesaw Mountain; Siege of Atlanta; Battle of Jonesboro; Battle of Saltville; Second Battle of Saltville

The 12th Kentucky Cavalry Regiment was a cavalry regiment that served in the Union Army during the American Civil War.

== Service ==
The 12th Kentucky Cavalry Regiment was organized at Caseyville and Owensboro, Kentucky and mustered in on November 17, 1862, for three years under the command of Colonel Quintus C. Shanks.

The regiment was attached to District of Western Kentucky, Department of the Ohio, to June 1863. 2nd Brigade, 3rd Division, XXIII Corps, Army of the Ohio, to August 1863. Independent Cavalry Brigade, XXIII Corps, to November 1863. 1st Brigade, 1st Division, Cavalry Corps, Department of the Ohio, to April 1864. 3rd Brigade, Cavalry Division, District of Kentucky, Department of the Ohio, May 1864. 1st Brigade, Cavalry Division, XXIII Corps, to June 1864. Detached Cavalry Brigade, 3rd Division, XXIII Corps, to August 1864. Dismounted Brigade, Cavalry Division, XXIII Corps, to September 1864. 1st Brigade, Cavalry Division, XXIII Corps, September 1864. District of Louisville, Kentucky, to November 1864. 2nd Brigade, 4th Division, XXIII Corps, to March 1865. 2nd Brigade, Cavalry Division, District of East Tennessee, to July 1865. Cavalry Brigade, District of East Tennessee, to August 1865.

The 12th Kentucky Cavalry mustered out of service on August 23, 1865.

== Detailed service ==
Action at Owensboro, Kentucky, September 18, 1862. Sutherland Farm September 19. Action at Calhoun, Kentucky, November 25, 1862. Operations against Morgan's Raid into Kentucky December 22, 1862 to January 2, 1863. Bear Wallow, Kentucky, December 23, 1862. Near Glasgow December 24. Bear Wallow and near Munfordville December 25. Bacon Creek near Munfordville December 26. Johnson's Ferry, Hamilton's Ford, Rolling Fork, December 29. Boston, Kentucky, December 29. Duty in District of Western Kentucky until April 1863. Creelsborough April 19. Expedition to Monticello and operations in southeastern Kentucky April 26-May 12. Narrows, Horse Shoe Bottom, April 28–29. Horse Shoe Bend, Greasy Creek, May 10. Pursuit of Morgan through Kentucky, Indiana, and Ohio July 2–26. Marrowbone July 2. Buffington's Island, Ohio, July 19, Surrender of Morgan near Cheshire, Ohio, July 20. New Lisbon, Ohio, July 26. Ordered to Glasgow, Kentucky, August 4. Burnside's march into eastern Tennessee August 16-October 17. Operations about Cumberland Gap September 7–10. Carter's Station September 20–21. Jonesboro September 21. Watauga River Bridge September 21–22. Philadelphia October 20. Knoxville Campaign November 4-December 23. Little River November 14–15. Stock Creek November 15. Near Knoxville November 16. Siege of Knoxville November 17-December 4. Clinch Mountain December 6. Rutledge December 7. Bean's Station December 9–17. Rutledge December 16. Blain's Cross Roads December 16–19. Bean's Station and Rutledge December 18. Bend of Chucky Road near Dandridge January 16–17. About Dandridge January 16–17. Dandridge January 17. About Dandridge January 26–28. Flat Creek and Muddy Creek January 26. Fair Garden January 27. Dandridge January 28. Moved to Lebanon, Kentucky, February 3–12. At Mt. Sterling until April. March from Nicholsville, Kentucky, to Dalton, Georgia, April 29-May 11. Atlanta Campaign May 11-September 8. Vernell Station May 11. Battle of Resaca May 14–15. Pine Log Creek May 18. Cassville May 19–22. Eutaw River May 20. About Dallas May 25-June 5. Burned Church May 26–27. Mt. Zion Church May 27–28. Allatoona May 30. Pine Mountain June 10. Operations about Marietta and against Kennesaw Mountain June 10-July 2. Lost Mountain June 11–17. Muddy Creek June 17. Noyes Creek June 19. McAffee's Cross Roads June 20. Cheyney's Farm June 22. Olley's Cross Roads June 26–27. Assault on Kennesaw June 27. Lost Mountain July 1–2. Nickajack Creek July 2–5. Chattahoochie River July 6–17. Siege of Atlanta July 22-August 25. Flank movement on Jonesboro August 25–30. Battle of Jonesboro August 31-September 1. Ordered to Louisville, Kentucky, September 14. Duty there at Lexington and Camp Nelson, Kentucky, until November. Rally Hill November 29. Burbridge's Saltville Expedition December 10–29. Kingsport December 13. Bristol December 14. Near Glade Springs December 15. Marion and capture of Wytheville, Virginia, December 16. Mt. Airey December 17. Near Marion December 17–18. Capture and destruction of salt works at Saltville, Virginia, December 20–21. Operations against Sue Mundy's guerrillas near Elizabethtown, Kentucky, and in Green River counties January and February 1865. Moved to Knoxville, Tennessee, March 20 and joined General Stoneman. Stoneman's Raid in southwest Virginia and western North Carolina March 20-April 27. Boone, North Carolina, March 28. Statesville April 10–11. Shallow Ford and near Mocksville April 11. Grant's Creek and Salisbury April 12. Catawba River near Morgantown April 17. Howard's Gap, Blue Ridge Mountains, April 22. Near Hendersonville April 23. Asheville April 25. Return to eastern Tennessee and duty at Sweetwater until August.

== Casualties ==
The regiment lost a total of 233 men during service; 3 officers and 22 enlisted men killed or mortally wounded, 4 officers and 204 enlisted men died of disease.

== Commanders ==
- Colonel Quintus C. Shanks

== See also ==
- List of Kentucky Civil War Units
- Kentucky in the Civil War
