= United Confederate Veterans =

American Civil War veterans' organization for soldiers and sailors of the CSA

- Abbreviation: UCV
- Successor: Sons of Confederate Veterans
- Formation: June 10, 1889
- Dissolved: December 31, 1951
- Type: American Civil War veterans' organization
- Purpose: Social, literary, historical and benevolent
- Headquarters: New Orleans, Louisiana
- Publication: The Confederate Veteran
- Affiliations: United Daughters of the Confederacy

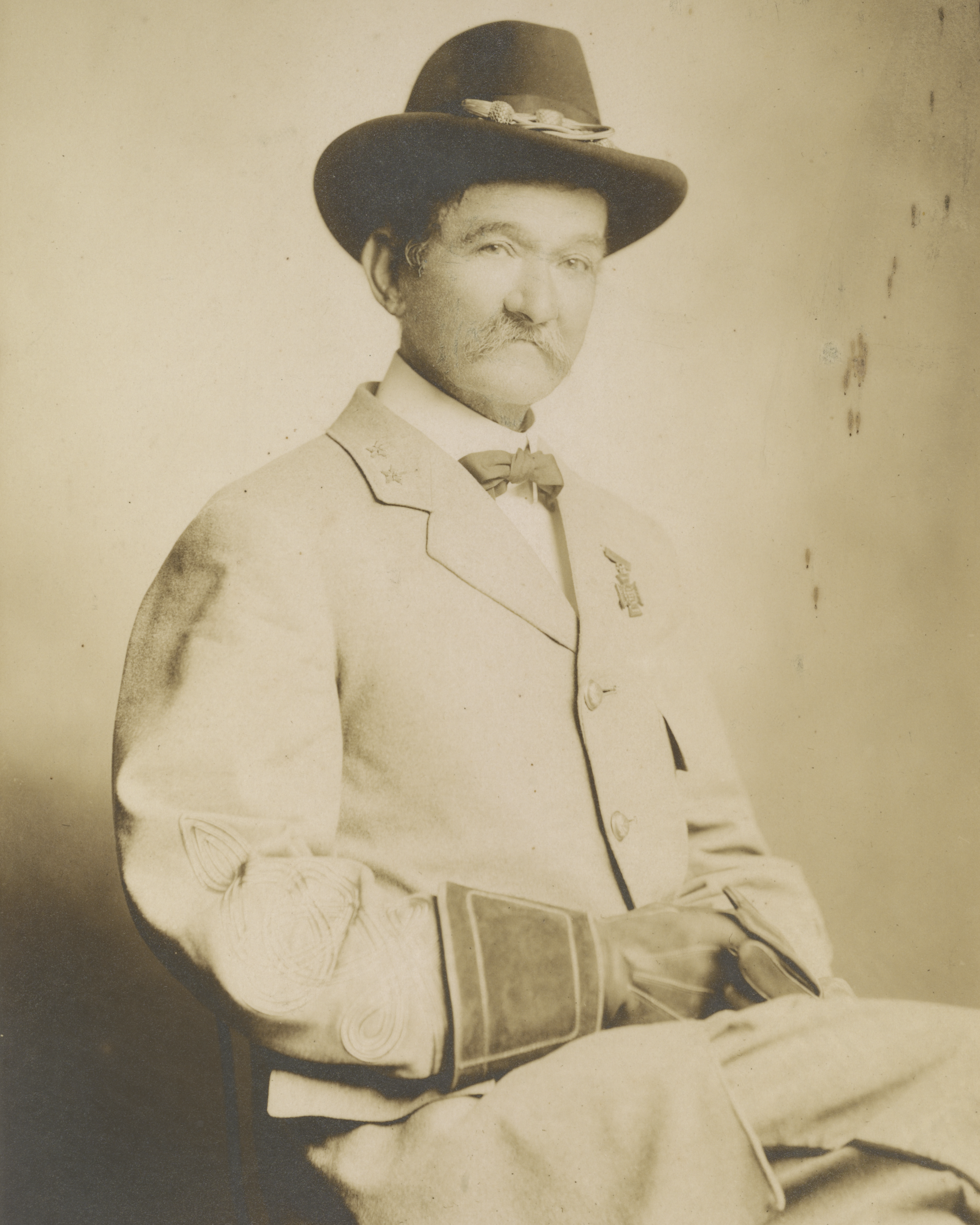
Unidentified Civil War veteran in United Confederate Veterans uniform with Southern Cross of Honor medal. From the Library of Congress Liljenquist Family Collection of Civil War Photographs

The United Confederate Veterans (UCV, or simply Confederate Veterans) was an American Civil War veterans' organization headquartered in New Orleans, Louisiana. It was organized on June 10, 1889, by ex-soldiers and sailors of the Confederate States of America as a merger between the Louisiana Division of the Veteran Confederate States Cavalry Association; N. B. Forrest Camp of Chattanooga, Tennessee; Tennessee Division of the Veteran Confederate States Cavalry Association; Tennessee Division of Association of Confederate Soldiers; Benevolent Association of Confederate Veterans of Shreveport, Louisiana; Confederate Association of Iberville Parish, Louisiana; Eighteenth Louisiana; Adams County (Mississippi) Veterans' Association; Louisiana Division of the Army of Tennessee; and Louisiana Division of the Army of Northern Virginia.

The U.S. equivalent of the UCV was the Grand Army of the Republic.

== History ==
=== Background ===
There had been numerous local veterans associations in the Southern United States, many of which became part of the UCV. The organization proliferated throughout the 1890s, culminating with 1,555 camps at the 1898 reunion. The next few years marked the zenith of UCV membership, lasting until 1903 or 1904 when veterans started to die off and the organization gradually declined.

=== Purpose ===
The UCV outlined its purposes and structure in a written constitution based on military lines. Members holding appropriate UCV "ranks" officered and staffed echelons of command from General Headquarters at the top to local camps (companies) at the bottom. Their declared purpose was emphatically nonmilitary – to foster "social, literary, historical, and benevolent" ends.

According to Paul H. Buck in his Pulitzer-Prize winning history of the reconciliation of North and South, educator Jabez L. M. Curry played a major role in promoting reunification of the sections. He told the 1896 UCV annual convention that their organization was not formed, "in malice or in mischief, in disaffection, or in rebellion, nor to keep alive sectional hates, nor to awaken revenge for defeat, nor to kindle disloyalty to the Union." Rather their "recognition of the glorious deeds of our comrades is perfectly consistent with loyalty to the flag and devotion to the Constitution and the resulting Union." The convention agreed with him and formally resolved the Confederate veteran has: "returned to the Union as an equal, and he remains in the Union as a friend. With no humble apologies, no unmanly servility, no petty spite, no sullen treachery, he is a cheerful, frank citizen of the United States, accepting the present, trusting the future, and proud of the past."

The UCV sponsored Florida's Tribute to the Women of the Confederacy (1915).

=== Reunions ===
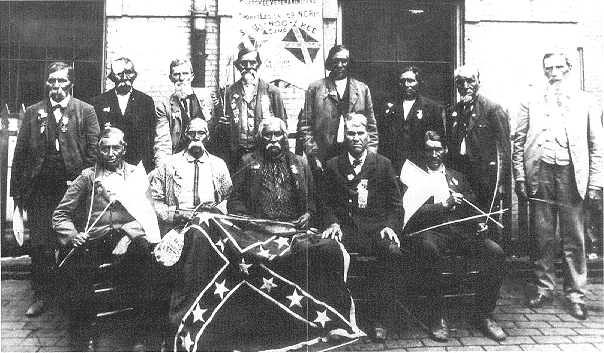
Cherokee Confederates (Thomas' Legion) at the U.C.V reunion in New Orleans, 1903.

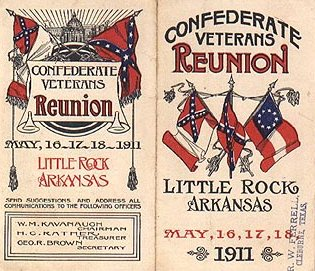
Confederate veterans reunion May 1911

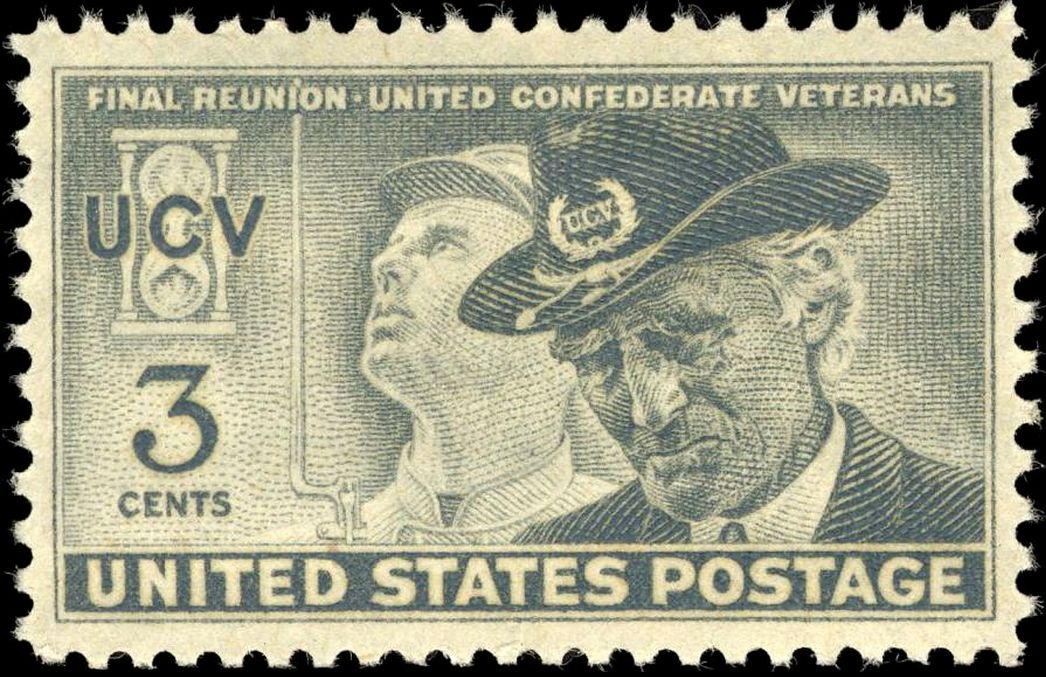
1951 Commemorative postage stamp

The national organization assembled annually in a general convention and social reunion presided over by the Commander-in-Chief. These annual reunions served the UCV as an aid in achieving its goals. Convention cities made elaborate preparations and tried to put on bigger events than the previous hosts. The gatherings continued to be held long after the membership peak had passed, and despite fewer veterans surviving, they gradually grew in attendance, length, and splendor. Numerous veterans brought family and friends along, further swelling the crowds. Many Southerners considered the conventions significant social occasions. Perhaps thirty thousand veterans and another fifty thousand visitors attended each of the mid- and late-1890 reunions, and the numbers increased. In 1911, an estimated crowd of 106,000 members and guests crammed into Little Rock, Arkansas—a city of less than one-half that size. Then the passing years began taking a telling toll, and the reunions grew smaller. But still, the meetings continued until, in 1950, at the sixtieth reunion, only one member could attend, 98-year-old Commander-in-Chief James Moore of Selma, Alabama. The following year, 1951, the United Confederate Veterans held its sixty-first and final reunion in Norfolk, Virginia, from May 30 to June 3. Three members attended: William Townsend, John B. Salling, and William Bush. The U.S. Post Office Department issued a 3-cent commemorative stamp in conjunction with that final reunion. The last verified Confederate veteran, Pleasant Crump, died at age 104 on December 31, 1951.

=== The Confederate Veteran ===
In addition to national meetings, another prominent factor contributed to the growth and popularity of the UCV. This monthly magazine became the official UCV organ, the Confederate Veteran. Founded as an independent publishing venture in January 1893 by Sumner Archibald Cunningham, the UCV adopted it the following year. Cunningham personally edited the magazine for twenty-one years and bequeathed almost his entire estate to ensure its continuance. The magazine was of very high quality, and circulation was wide. Many veterans penned recollections or articles for publication on its pages. Readership always greatly exceeded circulation because numerous camps and soldiers' homes received one or two copies for their numerous occupants. For example, an average of 6500 copies were printed per issue during the first year of publication, but Cunningham estimated that fifty thousand people read the twelfth issue.

== See also ==
- Confederate Memorial Day
- List of Confederate monuments and memorials
- Grand Army of the Republic
- Confederate Memorial Hall
- Confederate Memorial Hall Museum
- Southern Cross of Honor
- Lost Cause of the Confederacy
- Louisiana in the American Civil War
- Sons of Confederate Veterans, headquartered in Columbia, Tennessee
- United Daughters of the Confederacy
