= Confederate Memorial Hall =

Confederate Memorial Hall (former name)
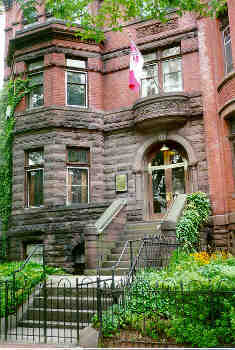
- Confederate Memorial Hall, with flag, in 1997
- Interactive map of the Confederate Memorial Hall (former name) area
- Alternative names: Confederate Embassy

General information
- Status: Closed and building sold to pay fines. Converted into four apartments.
- Type: Brownstone townhouse
- Location: 1322 Vermont Avenue, Washington, D.C.
- Coordinates: 32.9089°N 77.0308°W
- Completed: 1885
- Inaugurated: 1907
- Closed: 1997
- Cost: $3,900,000 (2014 transaction)

Technical details
- Floor count: 4 floors + finished basement
- Floor area: 9,880 square feet (918 m^{2})
- Grounds: 4,356 square feet (404.7 m^{2})

Other information
- Number of rooms: 25, including 11 bedrooms
- Parking: carport

Website
- https://confederate.org/hall.html

The Confederate Memorial Hall (sometimes calling itself the "Confederate Embassy") was a museum, library, and social club owned by the Confederate Memorial Association and located at 1322 Vermont Avenue NW in Washington, D.C. The brownstone that housed it, just off Logan Circle, became a private residence in 1997.

== Description ==
The Hall was originally the Confederate Memorial Home, a residence and gathering place for Confederate veterans. In 1919, 54 years after the Civil War's end, with few veterans still alive, it was converted into the Confederate Memorial Hall, no longer a residence but a library, museum, and "social hall for white politicians from the South". Notices in newspapers tell of events held there: the United Sons of Confederate Veterans, a "musical entertainment" in 1909; the Children of the Confederacy hosted in 1913; the women's auxiliary, a benefit concert in 1914; the United Daughters of the Confederacy, a reception in 1916 and a benefit card party in 1917; open house in 1917 for those attending "the annual pilgrimage of Confederate veterans to Arlington".

According to a 1997 web page kept active, the Hall had oil portraits of Jefferson Davis and Generals Robert E. Lee, Stonewall Jackson, Sterling Price, Joseph E. Johnston, and Fitzhugh Lee. Also on display were an original print of the Burial of [William] Latane, a marble bust of General Robert E. Lee by "Lost Cause" sculptor Herbert Barbee, a Jefferson Davis sideboard, two chairs once the property of General Beauregard, "numerous battle flags", and the First National Flag of the Confederacy that flew during the siege of Atlanta. The library contained over 1,000 books. The Hall had a collection of Civil War-era musical instruments on which small concerts of Civil War-era music were performed, "a copy of Lee's farewell order to his troops after the Battle of Appomattox...as well as a yellowed legal copy of Davis' bail bond".

During the 1960s and 70s, the building and the association fell on hard times. Membership declined, and the hall became a refuge for vagrants. Hurley, whose father was a member, stepped in and helped refurbish the building, partly with his own money.

== Activities ==
"As the 20th century drew to a close, the CMA was sponsoring magnificent white tie grand balls, barbecues, horse events, and a myriad of activities that showcase Southern culture and its inherent good manners and abiding respect for others." On January 17, 1987, the date chosen because Robert E. Lee's birthday was January 19, the Association held an $80 (equivalent to $227 in 2025)–per–couple ball and fundraiser. It featured "period dancing to Stephen Foster melodies played on antique instruments." In March 1989, there was a fox hunt in Virginia. "In June there is a grand ball to celebrate the birthday of Jefferson Davis." It claimed a membership of several thousand, but the only visible member is its president, John Edward Hurley (who calls it "my...organization"). Hurley, who is described as a White House correspondent on the website of the Justice Integrity Project, and is also member of a lobbying group, has been president since the 1980s. Sarah McClendon was on the Association's board.

== Legal saga resulting in its closure ==
Richard T. Hines was a former South Carolina state legislator, U.S. General Services Administration official, commander of the Sons of Confederate Veterans chapter in Washington, and "a major neo-Confederate", who "in 1984...penned a paean to Preston Brooks, the secessionist South Carolina congressman who caned Senator Charles Sumner of Massachusetts on the Senate floor in 1854 for his speeches against slavery." In 1987, he filed suit seeking to dismiss Hurley and the association's vice president, Mrs. John Tilden Rogers. Hines complained, among other things, that Hurley operated the building for personal gain, renting out rooms and pocketing the proceeds.

"In one of the most bizarre cases to ever come before the courts", Hurley and Mrs. Rogers responded by suing Hines and six others, claiming they were victims of a legal coup. Hines and his followers countered with a $250,000 suit against Hurley and Mrs. Rogers. In 1990, Hurley filed a $5 million suit under the Racketeer Influenced and Corrupt Organizations Act, charging Hines and others with perjury, mail fraud, and money-laundering, "among other misdeeds". The suit was dismissed with prejudice, and defendants were awarded $69,066 in attorneys' fees. Over several years, Hurley also accused various people and federal agencies of corruption and a variety of financial crimes, as well as drug trafficking. In a letter to Attorney General Janet Reno, he linked government corruption and retribution for his whistleblowing, with the efforts to force members onto the Association's board and thus seize its building.

Hurley said his life was threatened on several occasions. There was a fight inside the Memorial Hall in which the shirt of one of Hurley's rivals was torn from his body...and the fracas "nearly led to bloodshed." "They call my wife and threaten her or threaten me and put notes on my door. That's Ku Klux Klan stuff." "I'm relatively conservative myself...[b]ut their conservatism is off the chart as far as I'm concerned." He was jailed briefly for contempt of court and fined $30,000 in court costs during this extended battle, "because he had failed to obey [the judge's] previous order requiring that Hurley add new members to the organization's board of directors". "According to Hurley, the individuals the judge had ordered on the board had affiliations with Oliver North's Contra operations." What "the North/Republican operatives" really wanted was..."a beautiful front behind which it can run a nasty military/intelligence operation".

To no avail, Hurley also reported the federal judge deciding his case, John H. Bayly Jr., to the District of Columbia Commission on Judicial Disabilities and Tenure. He alleged that Bayly "hired the plaintiffs to sue him", and feared "his own 'probable assassination' by the government as payback for his uncovering court complicity in cocaine trafficking."

According to Hurley, his "bizarre court odyssey" began in the 1980s when he canceled an Oliver North "Freedom Fighter" fund-raising event, to be held at Confederate Memorial Hall, for "denizens of the Reagan Doctrine, a peculiar gathering of Nicaraguan contras, Afghan-based mujahedeen and members of the Angolan guerrilla group UNITA, which was funded by the South African apartheid regime." He said he took this action because the Tax Code prohibited such political activity by his tax-exempt organization; in fact, Hurley's Association lost its 501 (c)(3) status for a few years but regained it. "Hurley said that after ten years of litigation he can prove beyond a shadow of doubt that members of Oliver North's operation was [sic] using a Mid-Atlantic Credit Union account in Gaithersburg, Maryland, and a review of this account would prove the costs imposed on Hurley were fraudulent. Judge Bayly, however, quashed subpoenas for both Oliver North and the account without explanation. Hurley said that the board of trustees of his organization, which included those trustees that Judge Bayly had ordered on the board, had voted to sell the museum to cover the fines and costs that were being imposed by the courts."

The building was seized and sold in 1997 to pay $500,000 in contempt of court fines that Hurley received in District of Columbia courts for undisclosed reasons. It then became a private residence.

"'Constitutional government is a thing of the past', Hurley sadly observed."
