= Sumner Archibald Cunningham =

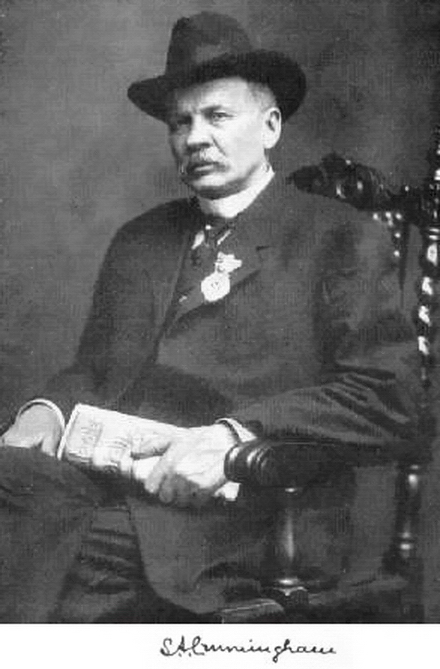
- Born: July 21, 1843; Bedford County, Tennessee, U.S.
- Died: December 13, 1913 (aged 70); Nashville, Tennessee, U.S.
- Resting place: Willow Mount Cemetery, Shelbyville, Tennessee, U.S.
- Occupation: Editor
- Spouse: Laura Davis
- Children: 1 son, 1 daughter
- Military career
- Allegiance: Confederate States
- Branch: Confederate States Army
- Service years: 1861–1865

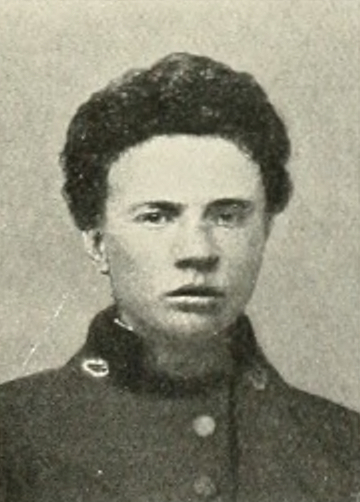
Wartime photograph of Cunningham

Sumner Archibald Cunningham (July 21, 1843 – December 20, 1913) was an American Confederate soldier and journalist. He was the editor of a short lived Confederate magazine called "Our Day" (1883-1884) published in New York. In 1893 he established the Confederate Veteran, a bimonthly magazine about veterans of the Confederate States Army until his death in 1913. He was a critic of Reconstruction, "scalawags", "carpetbaggers", and "Negro" legislators.

== Early life ==
Sumner Archibald Cunningham was born on July 21, 1843, in Bedford County, Tennessee. His father was John Washington Campbell Cunningham and his mother, Mary A. Buchanan. His family owned slaves.

During the American Civil War of 1861–1865, Cunningham served in the Confederate States Army. He was stationed at Camp Trousdale in Portland, Tennessee, until he was captured by Union forces in the Battle of Fort Donelson and imprisoned at Camp Morton in Indianapolis. After he was released in exchange of other prisoners in Vicksburg, Mississippi, he fought in the Battle of Chickamauga on September 18–20, 1863, the Battle of Missionary Ridge on November 25, 1863, and the Battle of Franklin on November 30, 1864. He became a sergeant-major, but left the CSA after the Battle of Nashville on December 15–16, 1864.

== Career ==
Cunningham moved to Shelbyville, Tennessee, where he worked as a "dry good merchant." He also managed a bookstore in Shelbyville. In 1871, he authored Reminiscences of the Forty-first Tennessee Infantry. That year, he purchased The Shelbyville Commercial, a newspaper in Shelbyville, and served as its editor, as he did with the Rural Sun, a Nashville newspaper, in 1874–1875. By 1876, he purchased The Chattanooga Times, the main newspaper in Chattanooga, Tennessee, and edited it. By 1878, Cunningham "leased" it to Adolph Ochs, who purchased it in 1880. Cunningham purchased and edited The Cartersville Express, a newspaper in Cartersville, Georgia, in 1879. In 1883, he founded Our Day, a newspaper published in New York City whose target readership was Southerners, but it failed by 1885. He became a journalist for The Nashville American, serving as a correspondent from 1885 to 1892.

Cunningham founded The Confederate Veteran in 1893 in Nashville, Tennessee. Initially, it was a fundraising newsletter for the construction of a monument in honor of Jefferson Davis, the president of the Confederate States of America, in Richmond, Virginia. Over the years, it became "one of the New South's most influential monthlies" and made Cunningham a leader of the Lost Cause movement.

Cunningham attended meetings of the executive committee of the United Confederate Veterans, as he did for example in Louisville, Kentucky in 1903. Additionally, he encouraged the co-founders of the United Daughters of the Confederacy (UDC), Caroline Meriwether Goodlett and Anna Raines, to make up after Raines complained Goodlett had taken over.

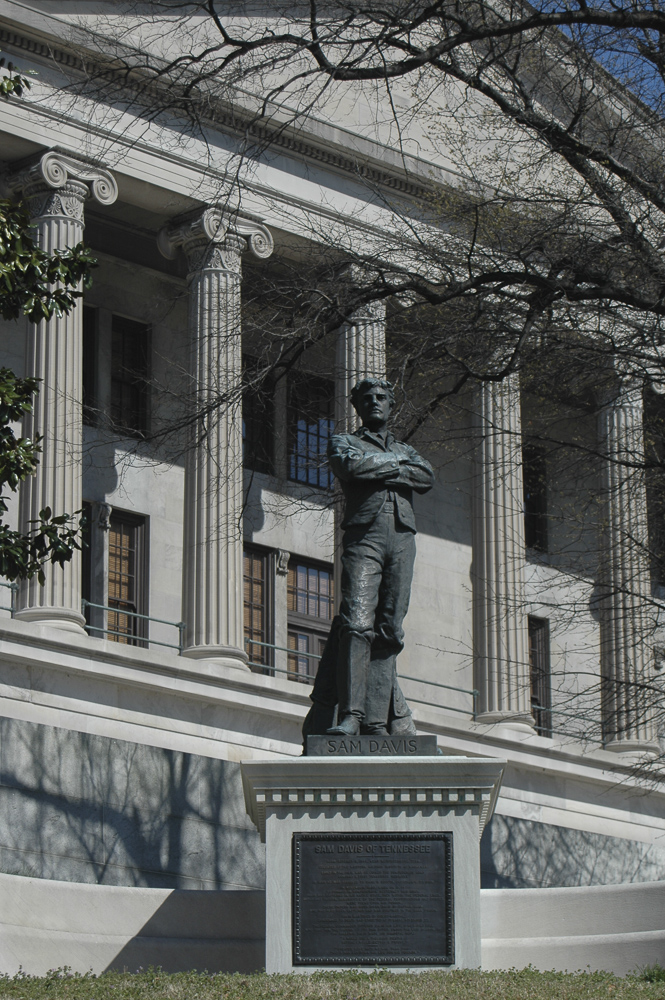
The Sam Davis Statue

Cunningham attended the dedication of the Confederate Monument in Owensboro, Kentucky in September 1900. On April 29, 1909, he attended the dedication of the Sam Davis Statue outside the Tennessee State Capitol in Nashville; it was Cunningham who had suggested its commission. In 1913, he was responsible for the construction of a sculpture of Union veteran Richard Owen to the Indiana Capitol in Indianapolis, Indiana; Cunningham was praised for his willingness to celebrate a Union veteran. Meanwhile, he was working on a monument to Dan Emmett, the songwriter of "Dixie" by the time of his death. He also served on the committee for the construction of the Jefferson Davis State Historic Site in Fairview, Kentucky, but he died before it was erected.

Cunningham's portrait was painted by Cornelius Hankins.

== Personal life ==
Cunningham married to Laura Davis on November 27, 1866. They had a son, Paul Davis Cunningham, who drowned in the Rio Grande River while surveying the border between the United States and Mexico in his role as an engineer for the United States Army. He also had a daughter, who died as an infant. His wife predeceased him in 1879.

== Death and legacy ==
Cunningham died of nose haemorrhage on December 13, 1913, at Saint Thomas Hospital in Nashville, Tennessee. His funeral was held at the First Presbyterian Church in Nashville. Pallbearers included generals Bennett H. Young, Virgil Young Cook, and John P. Hickman. He was buried at the Willow Mount Cemetery in Shelbyville, Tennessee.

By January 1914, the Nashville and Tennessee chapters of the United Daughters of the Confederacy passed a resolution in honor of Cunningham. Meanwhile, in May 1914, he was honored at their annual convention.

In 1915, a memorial museum of Confederate veterans named in honor of Cunningham was considered. A fundraising campaign of US$10,000 was launched for a fireproof building. However, the project failed due to lack of funds, despite renewed appeals in 1916 and 1917.

On October 28, 1921, a bronze and granite monument designed by Italian sculptor Giuseppe Moretti was added to Cunningham's grave in Shelbyville. The Nashville chapter of the UDC endowed the S. A. Cunningham Scholarship at Peabody College (now Vanderbilt University) in his memory.

Cunningham was succeeded as editor of The Confederate Veteran by Edith D. Pope. His papers are held at the Louis Round Wilson Special Collections Library on the campus of the University of North Carolina at Chapel Hill.
