= Confederate Veteran =

American magazine

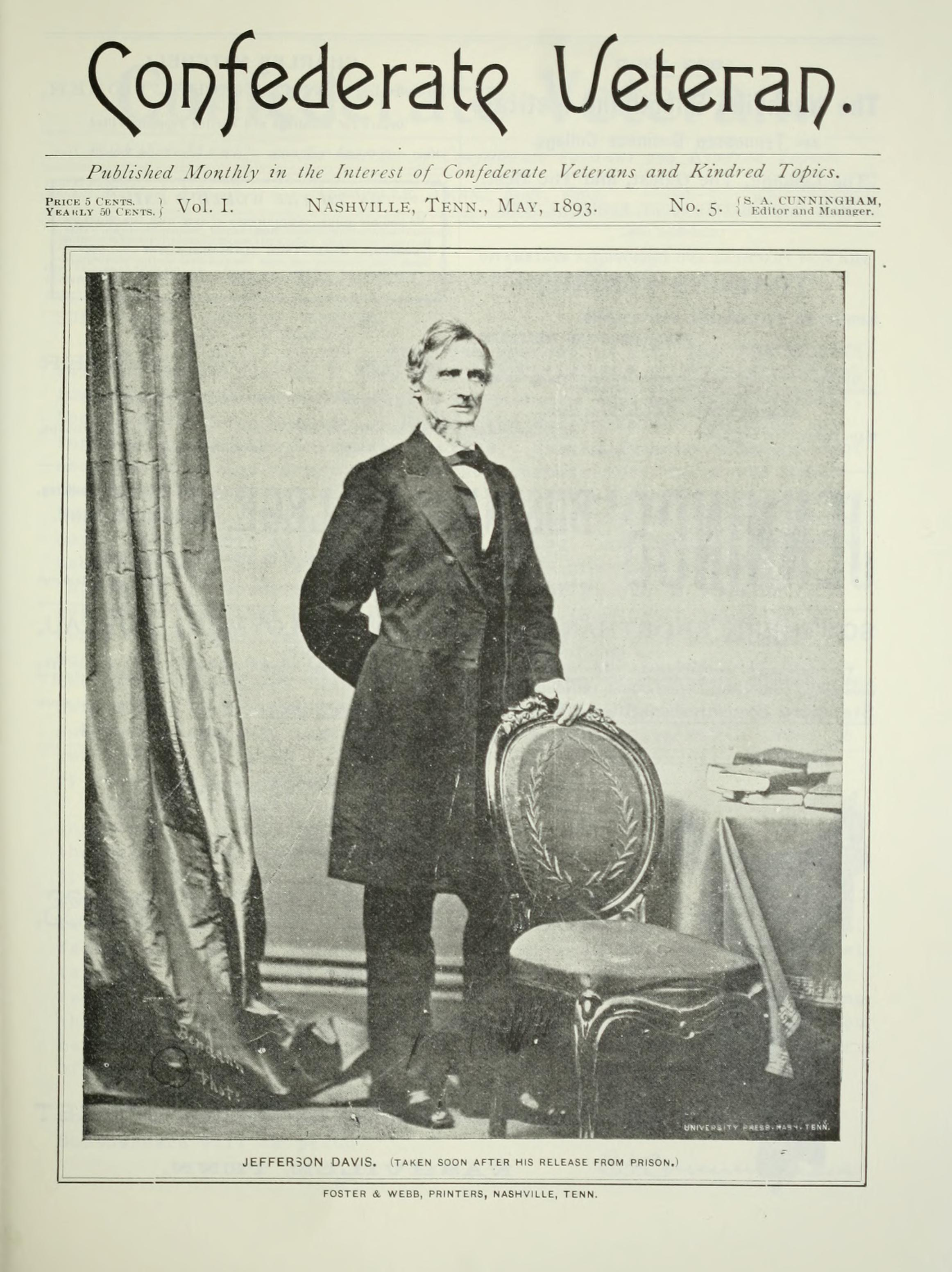
- Confederate Veteran, cover dated May 1893
- Editor: Frank B. Powell III
- Former editors: S. A. Cunningham; Edith D. Pope
- Frequency: Bimonthly
- Founder: S. A. Cunningham
- Founded: 1893
- Final issue: 1932 (until 1984 revival)
- Language: English
- OCLC: 1564663

The Confederate Veteran was a magazine about veterans of the Confederate States Army during the American Civil War of 1861–1865. It published histories of the Civil War with a focus on Confederate events, propagating the myth of the Lost Cause of the Confederacy. It was instrumental in popularizing the legend of Sam Davis. A subsequent magazine of the same title is still in print and is an official publication of the Sons of Confederate Veterans organization.

== History ==
The Confederate Veteran was founded by Sumner Archibald Cunningham in Nashville, Tennessee in 1893. Initially, it was a fundraising newsletter for the construction of a monument in honor of Jefferson Davis, the President of the Confederate States, in Richmond, Virginia. Its first issue included several articles about Jefferson Davis written by Cunningham, Abram Joseph Ryan's poem entitled, The Conquered Banner, and an article about the town of Lexington, Virginia written by J. William Jones, a Southern Baptist minister.

The magazine became "the official organ first of the United Confederate Veterans and later of the United Daughters of the Confederacy, the Sons of Confederate Veterans, and the Confederate Southern Memorial Society." Over the years, the magazine became "one of the New South's most influential monthlies." Through it, Cunningham became a leader of the Lost Cause movement. It had a readership of over 20,000 by 1900. After Cunningham's death in 1913, the second editor was Edith D. Pope. In a 1927 edition of the magazine, Pope debunked the claims made by William Mack Lee about supposedly serving as a body servant to Robert E. Lee. The magazine ceased publication in 1932.

A new magazine with the same name began publication in 1984, printed by the Sons of Confederate Veterans. This current incarnation is printed six times per year, and is mailed to members of the Sons of Confederate Veterans. An online digital version is also available. Subscriptions to the magazine can be purchased by non-members.

== See also ==
- Southern Bivouac
- The Southern Historical Society
