= Rittenhouse Club =

Private club in Philadelphia, US

Coordinates: 39.948738°N 75.167070°W

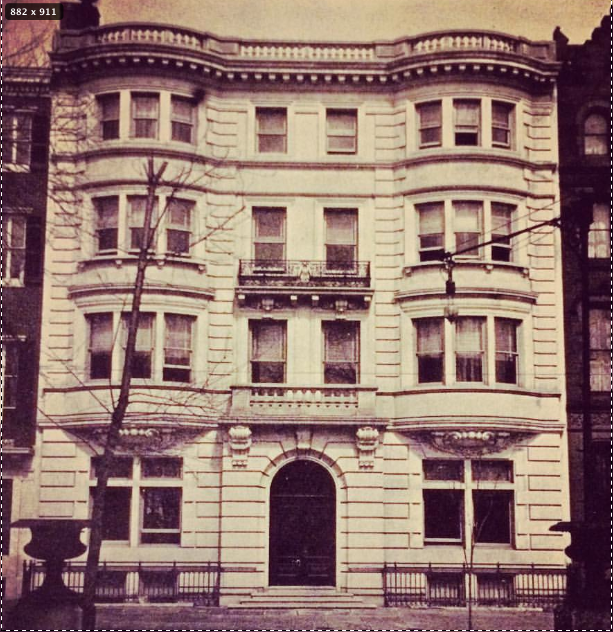
The Rittenhouse Club's former location at 1811 Walnut Street in Philadelphia. The façade, which was updated in 1901 by Newman Woodman & Harris architects, still graces Rittenhouse Square in the city.

Rittenhouse Club was a private institution and social club in Philadelphia, Pennsylvania. It was founded in 1875 to allow "businessmen, intellectuals and artists to socialize in a congenial, friendly atmosphere."

== History ==
=== 19th century ===
The Gentlemen's club was founded in 1874 as the Social Arts Club of Philadelphia by Dr. William Pepper and Silas Weir Mitchell. The club was renamed in late 1875 when it moved to a new building on Rittenhouse Square that had been the home of James Harper.

James E. Carpenter, Esquire was later the governor of the Rittenhouse Club. He was instrumental at securing the former home of Congressman James Harper in 1875.

By 1880, the northern side of Rittenhouse Square was the de facto "most fashionable address in Philadelphia." In 1900, the club expanded by adding an adjoining townhouse. This created not only a larger structure but also more prestige fronting the square.

The Rittenhouse Club had many of the faculty of the University of Pennsylvania along with gentlemen architects such as from the T-Square Club. Members of the Northern Pennsylvania business elite intermingled with architects, professors and clergymen. These included during the fashionable Gilded Age, steamship magnate Clement Griscom, architect Frank Furness, along with his Shakespeare scholar sibling Horace Furness. The University of Pennsylvania provost Dr. William Pepper, his nephew Senator George Wharton Pepper, and financier E.T. Stotesbury held prominent positions in the club.

=== 20th century ===
After the end of World War II, due to tax loopholes being removed, general business changes and economics caused many members to move to the suburbs. The Rittenhouse Club suffered a slow decline of members and the "building slid from elegance into genteel decay."

In the early 1990s, the Rittenhouse Club building was closed and sold. Today, "Only the discreet letters “RC” on the brass doorplates identify 1811 Walnut Street as the former home of one of Philadelphia's most prestigious clubs. The Beaux-Arts façade remains, but the building behind it is gone."

== Early Members ==
- James Edward Carpenter (1841-1901).
- Louis H. Carpenter (1839-1916).
- Edward Walter Clark, Jr. (1857-1946).
- Frank Furness (1839-1912).
- George Fort Gibbs (1870-1942).
- George Byron Gordon (1870-1927).
- Robert Sturgis Ingersoll.
- George W. Pepper (1867-1961).
- Owen Wister (1860-1938).

== Selected publications ==
- Nathaniel Burt, The Perennial Philadelphians: The Anatomy of an American Aristocracy (Philadelphia: University of Pennsylvania Press, 1999, 2007) ISBN 9780812216936
- Nancy Heinzen, Perfect Square: A History of Rittenhouse Square (Philadelphia: Temple University Press, 2009) ISBN 9781592139880
- Liz Spikol, “Comcast CEO Brian Roberts Buys at 10 Rittenhouse,” CurbedPhilly, October 19, 2012.
