= James Edward Carpenter =

American Civil War officer

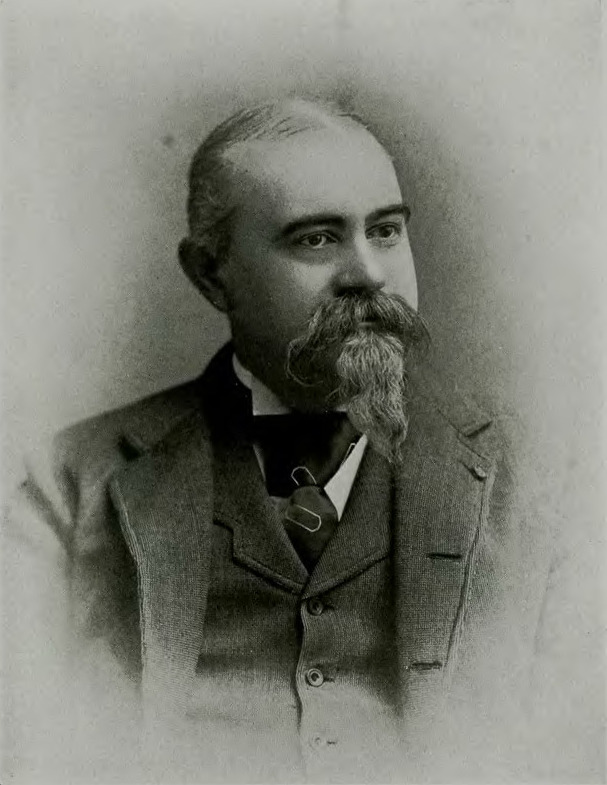
- Born: March 6, 1841; Chesterfield, Kent County, Maryland
- Died: August 16, 1901 (aged 60); Newburyport, Massachusetts
- Relatives: General Louis H. Carpenter, brother
- Military career
- Allegiance: United States of America
- Branch: United States Army & Union Army
- Service years: 1861–1864
- Rank: Major of volunteers
- Conflicts: American Civil War; *Battle of Gettysburg; *Battle of Chancellorsville
- Other work: attorney at law

James Edward Carpenter (March 6, 1841 – August 16, 1901) served in the Union Army in 1861 as a private in the 8th Pennsylvania Cavalry Regiment. In 1862 he became a second lieutenant and progressed in rank to first lieutenant, captain, then a brevet major of volunteers due to gallantry. He later served his community and Philadelphia with honor as a business lawyer of high respect.

== Early life ==
James Carpenter was the second eldest son of eight children born to Edward Carpenter 2nd and Anna Maria (Mary) Howey. He was born in Chesterfield, Kent County, Maryland and in 1843 his family moved to Philadelphia where they attended Trinity Episcopal Church in West Philadelphia. (Note: Trinity Episcopal Church, West Philadelphia, is now where the Mario Lanza Park is located. The Church once stood west of Second Street, between Catharine and Queen streets. This Church was consecrated in 1822, closed in 1908 and razed by 1917 with the new park "Queen Park" open in late 1918. The park was renamed on September 29, 1967 in memory of Mario Lanza (1921–1959) one of Philadelphia's most beloved signers and film stars. See: "Then and Now Trinity Episcopal Church" at: "Archived copy" (PDF). Archived from the original (PDF) on 2008-08-20.)

== Civil War ==
In 1861, he enlisted as a private the Eighth Pennsylvania Cavalry, and in 1862 he was commissioned as a second lieutenant.

During the night of September 17/18, 1862, he was wounded seriously inside the elbow in the engagement at Philomont, Virginia, on the advance at the end of the fighting at the Battle of Antietam.

In the early evening of May 2, 1863, he was part of the heroic, but ultimately futile, charge of the Eighth Pennsylvania Cavalry against Confederate General Jackson's Corp flanking attack during the Battle of Chancellorsville. His horse was shot from under him and, of the five officers who rode at the head of the attacking column, he was one of only two who survived. This charge only marginally slowed down the collapse of the right flank of the Union Army Major General Joseph Hooker's Army of the Potomac. Hooker had only left a token force of cavalry with his main attack thinking they would not be needed in the woods. Hooker had sent 7,500 cavalry troopers with Major General George Stoneman to raid behind the Confederate line into their supply and communications. Stoneman's Raid, as it became known, ultimately failed in its main quest, but was a confidence builder for the Union cavalry.

On June 29, 1863, he was selected and served on the staff of Brigadier General D. McMurtrie Gregg, who was just given the command of the Second Cavalry Division, Cavalry Corps, under the reorganization by Major General George G. Meade. Brevet Major Carpenter for the next eighteen months excelled in this position, providing good documentation and order.

== Post Civil War ==
In early 1865, he was honorably discharged at the expiration of his term of service and returned to Philadelphia. He resumed the study of law in the office of Theodore Cuyler, Esq. (1819–1876).

In October 1865 he was admitted to the bar in Philadelphia.

As a lawyer he assisted in helping to establish the Military Order of the Loyal Legion of the United States in Philadelphia during May 1865. Later he became a companion of that order when the concern of conflict of interest was lifted.

== Family ==
On October 17, 1867, in Philadelphia, he wed Harriet Odin Dorr (22 Jul 1842 – 24 Jan 1896). She was the daughter of Reverend Benjamin Dorr and Esther K. Odin, both of Massachusetts. James & Harriet were wed by the Rector of Christ's Church, her father. She was a descendant of Edward Dorr, who was the first of that name in America. He immigrated to New England about 1670, from the west of England, where families of the surname Dorr have long been settled in Dorsetshire. They had the following children born in Philadelphia:

- Edward Carpenter IV, born August 27, 1872. He was a private in the First Troop Philadelphia City Cavalry during the Spanish–American War of 1898. He was commissioned a second lieutenant, 2nd Artillery U.S.Army on July 9, 1898. Promoted to first lieutenant on February 2, 1901, and captain on August 14, 1903. He attended Graduate Artillery school in 1903, In 1908 he was one of the first graduates of the School of Submarine Defense and assigned to Coast Artillery Corps. He was later promoted to Major and became an assistant to the Chief of Artillery in Washington, D.C. He married Janet FitzGerald Lee.
- Helen Dalton Carpenter, born November 11, 1874. She was baptized on December 18, 1874, in Christ's Church. She married Frederick Strong Mosley.
- Grace Carpenter, born October 25, 1876. She died as an infant on May 27, 1877.
- William Dorr Carpenter, born June 26, 1879.
- Lloyd Preston Carpenter, born March 28, 1884.

== Later life ==
He served as a second lieutenant of the First Troop Philadelphia City Cavalry.

He was elected Treasurer of the Historical Society of Pennsylvania and afterwards its vice president.

In 1877 he became a vestryman of Christ Church, a manager of Christ Church Hospital and of Christ Church Chapel. Later he was rector's warden of the Church of Ascension in Pittsburgh. He was delegate to the Diocesan Convention of the Episcopal Church.

He was the governor in the Rittenhouse Club which was known before 1873 as the Social Arts Club of Philadelphia. James was instrumental at securing the former home of James Harper in Rittenhouse Square in 1875 which led to the renaming of the exclusive men's club.

He was chairman of the Board of Managers and one of the founders (in 1888) of the Pennsylvania Society Sons of the Revolution.

He encouraged and financially assisted his brother, Brigadier General Louis H. Carpenter in the updating of their father's genealogical family history. This valuable work was published after his death in 1912 as "Samuel Carpenter and his Descendants."

James Edward Carpenter died suddenly while visiting his daughter Mrs. Helen Mosley on August 16, 1901, in Newburyport, Massachusetts.
