= Horace Binney =

American politician (1780–1875)

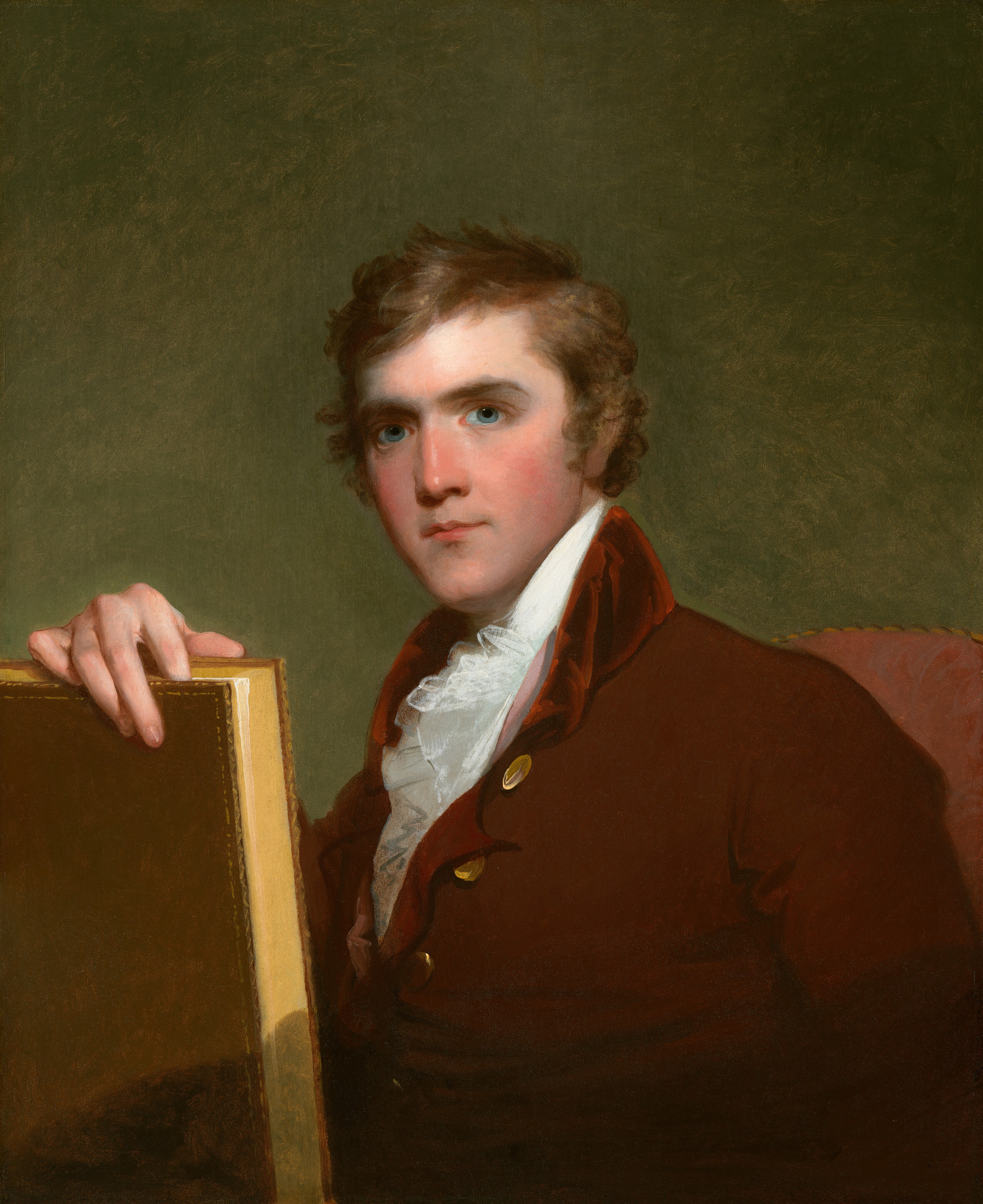
- Portrait by Gilbert Stuart, c. 1800

Member of the U.S. House of Representatives from Pennsylvania's 2nd district
- In office March 4, 1833 – March 3, 1835
- Preceded by: Henry Horn
- Succeeded by: Joseph R. Ingersoll

Personal details
- Born: January 4, 1780 Philadelphia, Pennsylvania, U.S.
- Died: August 12, 1875 (aged 95) Philadelphia, Pennsylvania, U.S.
- Party: Anti-Jacksonian (Before 1833); Whig (1833–1856)
- Spouse: Elizabeth Cox
- Relatives: Barnabas Binney (father); Horace Binney Wallace (nephew); Horace Binney Sargent (nephew); Mary Cadwalader Rawle Jones (great-granddaughter)
- Education: Harvard University (BA)

Horace Binney (January 4, 1780 – August 12, 1875) was an American lawyer, author, and public speaker who served as an Anti-Jacksonian in the United States House of Representatives.

== Early life ==
Binney was born in Philadelphia, Pennsylvania, the son of Dr. Barnabas Binney (1751–1787), a prominent Philadelphia physician who cared for Deborah Sampson. He graduated from Harvard College in 1797, where he founded the Hasty Pudding Club in 1795.

Through his sister Susan Binney Wallace, he was the uncle of Horace Binney Wallace (1817–1852), a legal critic and through his sister, Mary Sarah Binney Sargent (d. 1824), wife of Lucius Manlius Sargent (1786–1867), an author and temperance advocate, he was the uncle of well-known author and Horace Binney Sargent (1821–1908), a Civil war veteran.

== Career ==
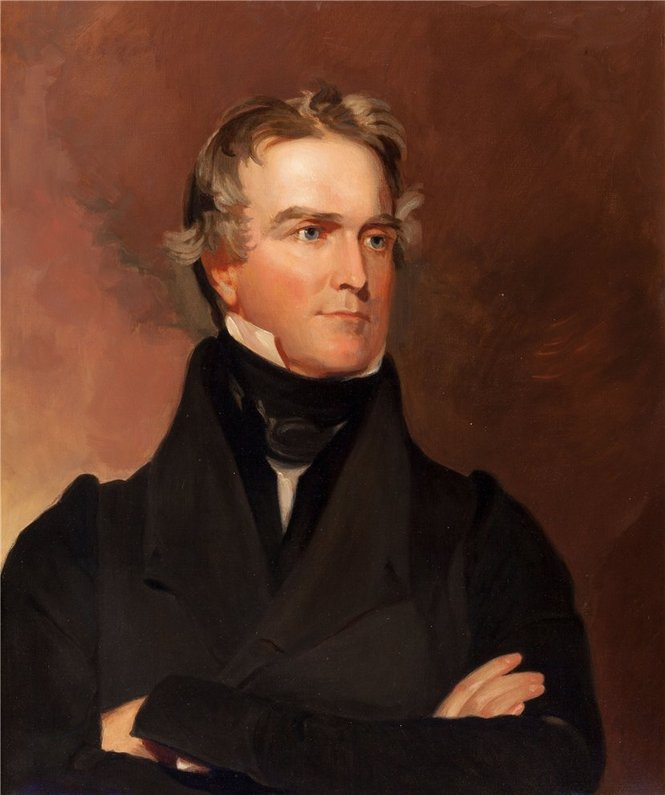
Portrait of Representative Binney by Thomas Sully, c. 1833

He then studied law in the office of Jared Ingersoll (1749–1822), who had been a member of the Constitutional convention of 1787, and who, from 1791 to 1800 and again from 1811 to 1816, was the attorney-general of Pennsylvania. In 1800, Binney was admitted to the bar in Philadelphia and practiced there with great success for half a century, and was recognized as one of the leaders of the bar in Pennsylvania and the United States.

Between 1806 and 1807, he served in the Pennsylvania legislature. From 1833 until 1835, he served as a Whig member of the United States House of Representatives. While in the House of Representatives, he defended the United States Bank and opposed the policies of President Andrew Jackson. In 1808, Binney was elected a member of the American Philosophical Society.

After leaving office, he returned to the practice of law. Binney's most famous cases were Lyle v. Richards (1823), and Vidal et al v. Philadelphia et al (1844). In the latter case, which involved the disposition of the fortune of Stephen Girard, he was unsuccessfully opposed by Daniel Webster. Binney's argument in this case greatly influenced the interpretation of the law of charities.

=== Public addresses and writings ===
Binney made many public addresses, the most noteworthy of which, entitled Life and Character of Chief Justice Marshall, was published in 1835. He also published Leaders of the Old Bar of Philadelphia, in 1858, and an Inquiry into the Formation of Washingtons Farewell Address, in 1859.

During the American Civil War he issued three pamphlets (1861, 1862 and 1865), discussing the right of habeas corpus under the American Constitution, and justifying President Lincoln in his suspension of the writ. He was elected an Associate Fellow of the American Academy of Arts and Sciences in 1867.

== Personal life ==
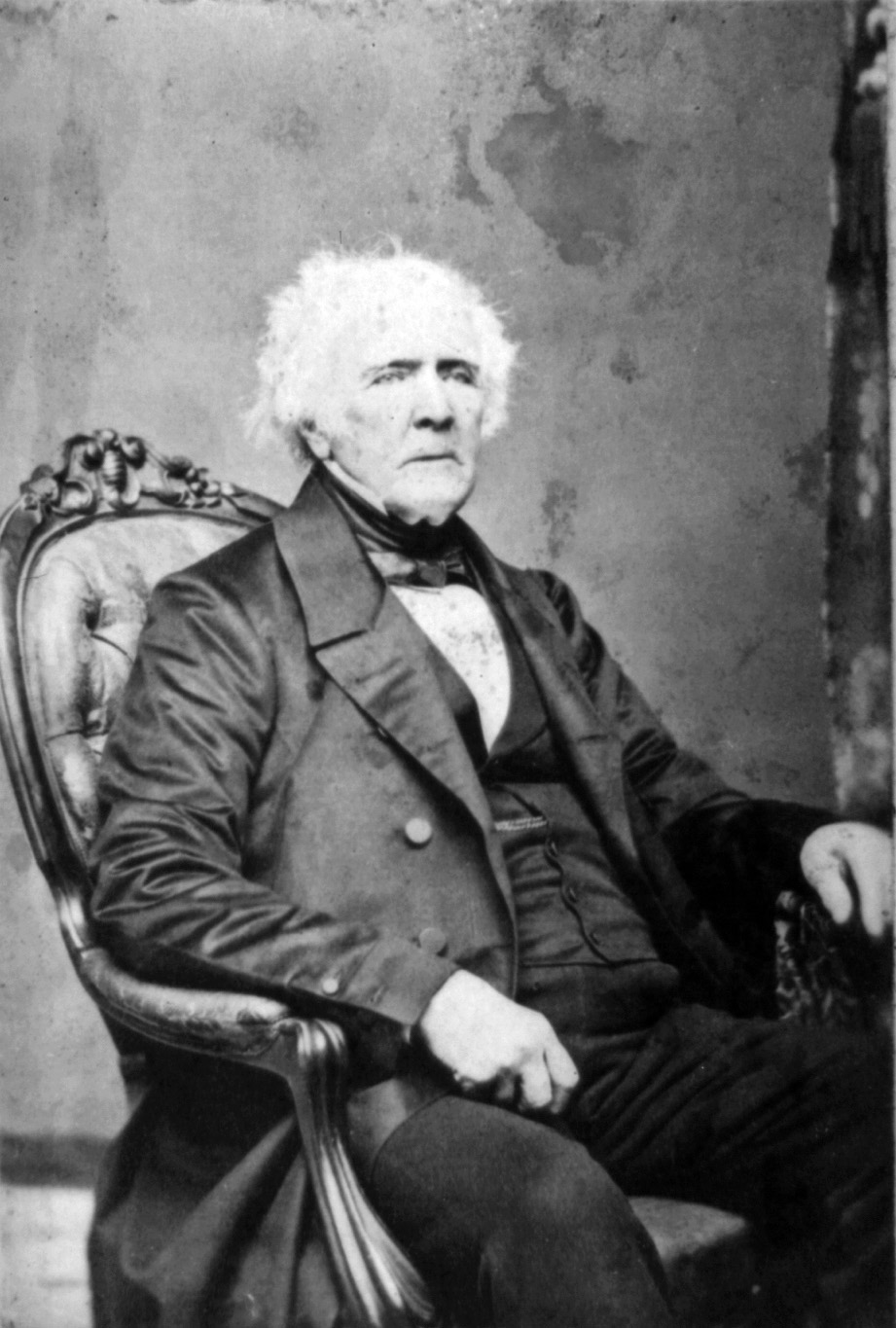
Photograph of Binney in his late years

Binney was married to Elizabeth Cox (1783–1865), one of six daughters of John Cox, Esq. of Bloomsbury, New Jersey, and descendants of the Langeveldts who originally settled New Brunswick, New Jersey. Her sister, Mary Cox, was married to the inventor John Stevens III (1749–1838). Together, Horace and Elizabeth were the parents of:

- Mary (1805-1831), first wife of Judge/Congressman John Cadwalader
- Horace Binney Jr. (1809–1870), a member of the American Philosophical Society. married Eliza Frances Johnson
- Esther Coxe Binney (1817–1902), who married John Innes Clark Hare (1816–1905), also an attorney.
- Elizabeth Binney (1820–1910), who married Richard Roger Montgomery (1818–1888), the son of William M. Montgomery and Marie d'Elincourt, on April 30, 1844. Elizabeth and Richard Montgomery were the grandparents of Helen Hope Montgomery Scott.
- Susan Binney (1822–1887)
- William Binney (1825–1909), a prominent banker in Providence, Rhode Island who married Charlotte Hope Goddard, the sister of Robert Hale Ives Goddard, in 1848.

In 1865 he was elected as a Companion of the Third Class in the Commandery of Pennsylvania of the Military Order of the Loyal Legion of the United States for his support of the Union during the war.

Binney died on August 12, 1875, at the age of 95 in Philadelphia, Pennsylvania, the city of his birth. He was buried in the churchyard of Church of St. James the Less in Philadelphia.

== See also ==
- Era of Good Feelings
- Second Party System

U.S. House of Representatives
| Preceded by Henry Horn | Member of the U.S. House of Representatives from Pennsylvania's 2nd congressional district 1833–1835; Served alongside: James Harper | Succeeded by Joseph R. Ingersoll |
