= Horace Binney Wallace =

American novelist

Horace Binney Wallace (February 26, 1817 – December 16, 1852) was an attorney, a critic of art and literature, and an accomplished author. He was a member of the Bar of Philadelphia.

== Biography ==
Horace Binney Wallace was born on South Fourth Street, Philadelphia to a wealthy family. His father was John Bradford Wallace, a lawyer; his mother, Susan, was sister to the prominent lawyer Horace Binney. Horace Wallace was the youngest of the family and had six older siblings: Susan, Mary, Elizabeth, William (died at 3 years old), Marshall (died at 1 year old), and John William Wallace.

Wallace began college at The University of Pennsylvania in 1830 at the age of thirteen; he then transferred in his junior year to Princeton University, where he graduated in 1835. He was recalled as being a child of a "somewhat individual and reclusive" disposition, as well as "fond and amiable". One of his Princeton professors, Willard Thorp, characterized him as being "an enigma wrapped in a cloak of mystery."

Before the age of twenty he had proposed a "New Theory of Comets" which his uncle Horace Wallace says he later discarded as "too playful for the grave science." In 1838 he published, anonymously, a novel in two volumes titled Stanley, Or, The Recollections of a Man of the World. Along with the judge John Innes Clark Hare, he published "a careful editorship" of Smith's Leading Cases and Tudor's Leading Cases in Equity. Many of his legal writings were also published in George Pope Morris and Nathaniel Parker Willis's Home Journal.

Wallace published under a number of pseudonyms during his career, including "William S. Somner", "William Landor", and "John H. Meredith". He contributed to many magazines including Graham's Magazine, Godey's Lady's Book, and The Knickerbocker. He is well known for having published in Burton's Gentleman's Magazine at the same time as Edgar Allan Poe, with whom he corresponded. Poe wrote that "He is an elaborately careful, stiff, and pedantic writer, with much affectation and great talent. Should he devote himself ultimately to letters, he cannot fail of high success."

He had a strong friendship with Rufus Griswold, the American anthologist. Griswold, after discovering the true identity of "William Landor," requested that Horace Wallace be featured in his upcoming Prose Writers of America (1847). Wallace declined; instead, Griswold dedicated the volume to him.

== Death ==
Horace Wallace was unmarried and had no children. He died at the age of thirty-five in the Hotel des Bains, Paris. His obituary, written by his uncle Horace Binney, says his nephew's cause of death was related to a "diseased cerebral action, induced by some lesion of the blood-vessels in the brain," but it was later revealed that he died by suicide, having cut his throat. "Except in the Law," his uncle wrote of him in his obituary, "he wrote and published anonymously. His modesty, rather than indifference to reputation, was the cause of it." His brother, John William Wallace, published two collections of his brother's works after his death: a collection of notes from his travels abroad titled "Art, Scenery And Philosophy in Europe" (1855), and "Literary Criticisms and other papers" (1856).

He is buried at St. Peter's Episcopal Church, Society Hill, Philadelphia.
