= Alexander J. Harper =

American politician

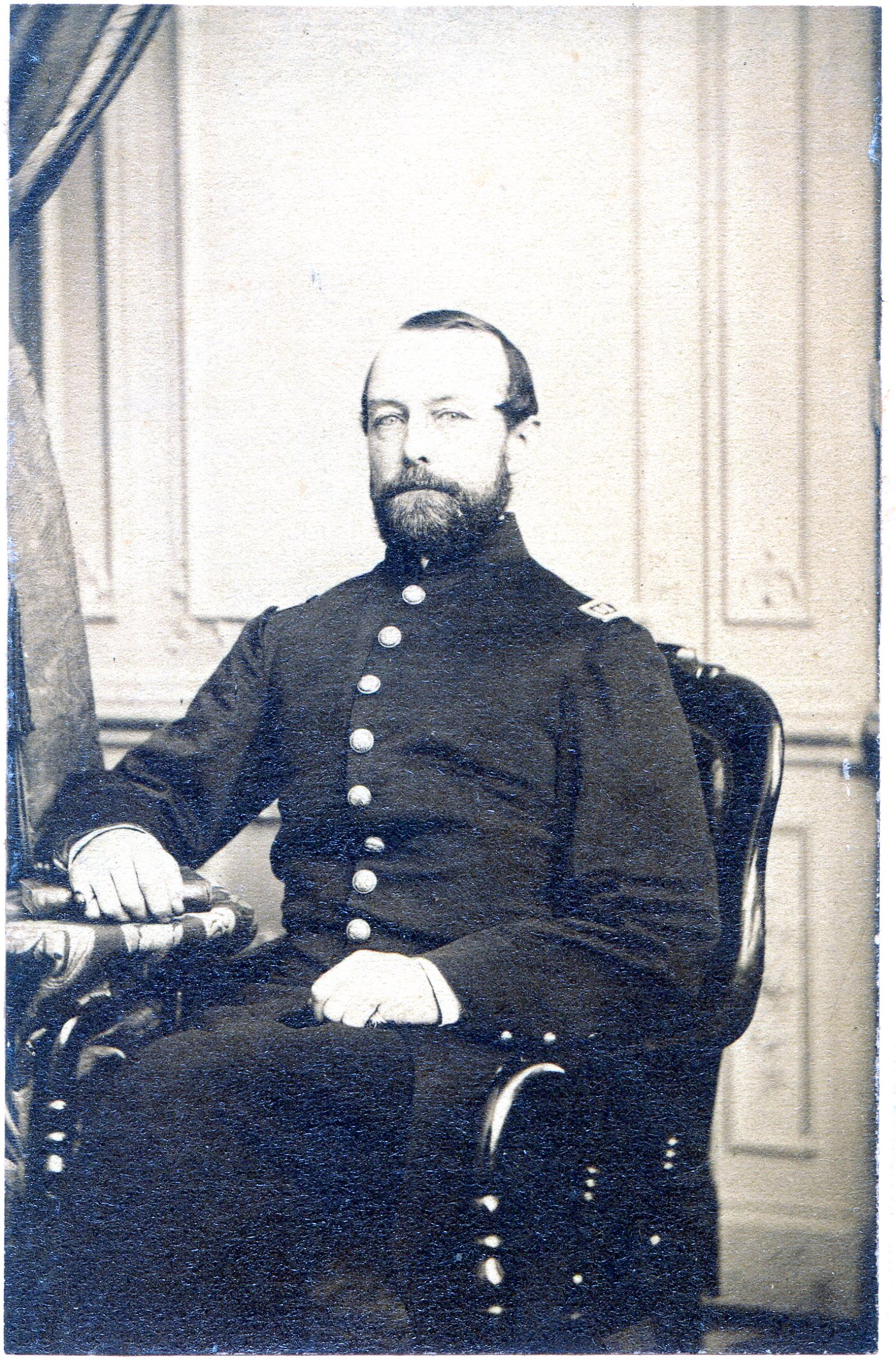
Alexander J. Harper (c. 1864). Portrait photograph by Broadbent & Co., Philadelphia.

Alexander James Harper was an American businessman and politician who served as President of the Common Council (City Council) of Philadelphia during the time of the United States Civil War.

Harper was born July 13, 1816, in Philadelphia, son of the brick manufacturer (and later US Congressman) James Harper and his wife Charlotte Alford Sloan Harper. In 1838, he married Caroline Emily Holmes, connecting his family by kinship to a set of New England political families that included the Adams family of Massachusetts. Caroline died shortly after the birth of their only child, who would grow up to be the businessman and inventor James Holmes Harper.

Alexander James Harper followed his father on a dual track of business and public service, and was elected to the Philadelphia Board of Guardians of the Poor in 1847. In 1854, he was elected to represent the Eleventh Ward on the Philadelphia Common Council, and in 1861 returned to the Council for eight more years, representing the Eighth Ward. He served a one-year term as President of the Council in 1864, at the height of the Civil War, and remained a member until 1869. At the time of his death later that year, he was President of the Nicholson Wood Paving Company and a Trustee of the Philadelphia Gas Works.

Contemporary reports characterize Harper as a “zealous Republican,” and an “ever active and vigilant” man who “intimately identified himself with all reform measures.” A member of the Union League and the National Union Club, he was dedicated to the cause of maintaining the union. In 1865, in the wake of Abraham Lincoln's assassination, Harper was appointed to the Committee of Arrangements, the group that handled the Philadelphia reception and lying-in-state of the president's body.

Harper was a well-loved and respected figure: as the Sunday Morning Times eulogized, “in his private relations he was courteous and agreeable, in his public, honest and clear-sighted; in all, a true and noble man.” He had the confidence of the opposition and a reputation for integrity. These qualities encouraged supporters to try to convince him to stand as the Republican candidate for mayor in the 1868 election. He declined, however, and the party ran General Hector Tyndale instead. Within a year, Harper died of an unexpected and sudden illness of the bowels, at the family house on Rittenhouse Square, in August 1869.
