= Henry Horn =

American politician

Member of the U.S. House of Representatives from Pennsylvania's 2nd district
- In office March 4, 1831 – March 3, 1833
- Preceded by: Daniel H. Miller
- Succeeded by: Horace Binney; James Harper

Personal details
- Born: 1786 Philadelphia, Pennsylvania, US
- Died: January 12, 1862 (aged 75–76) Flourtown, Pennsylvania, US
- Party: Jacksonian

Henry Horn (1786 – January 12, 1862) was a Jacksonian member of the U.S. House of Representatives from Pennsylvania.

== Biography ==
Henry Horn was born in Philadelphia, Pennsylvania. He studied law, was admitted to the bar and practiced law in Philadelphia.

Horn was elected as a Jacksonian to the Twenty-second Congress. He was an unsuccessful candidate for reelection to the Twenty-third Congress in 1832. He resumed the practice of law in Philadelphia, and served as collector of customs at Philadelphia from May 12, 1845, until August 4, 1846. He died in Flourtown, Pennsylvania, in 1862. He was interred in Woodlands Cemetery in Philadelphia.

== Sources ==
- United States Congress. "Henry Horn (id: H000787)". Biographical Directory of the United States Congress.
- The Political Graveyard

U.S. House of Representatives
Preceded by Daniel H. Miller	Member of the U.S. House of Representatives from Pennsylvania's 2nd congressional district 1831–1833	Succeeded by Horace Binney; James Harper
