= Barnabas Binney =

American physician

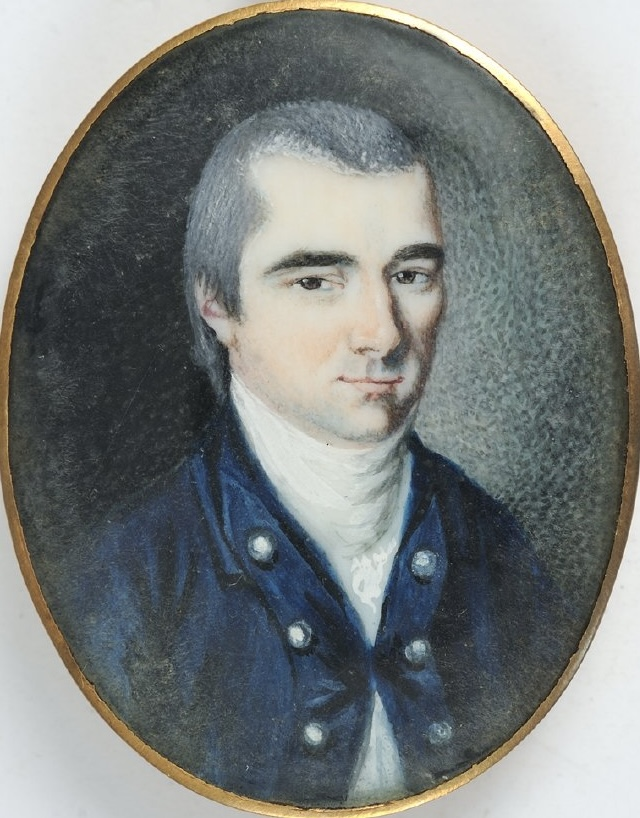
- Miniature portrait, c. 1779–1783
- Born: 1751; Boston, Massachusetts
- Died: 21 June 1787 (aged 35–36) near Berkeley Springs, Virginia
- Education: Brown University
- Occupation: Physician
- Known for: Discovering Deborah Sampson's true identity as "Robert Shirtliff"
- Spouse: Mary Woodrow
- Children: Horace Binney (among others)

Barnabas Binney (1751 – 21 June 1787) was an American physician.

The son of a sea captain, Binney was born in Boston in 1751. He was educated at Brown University, graduating at the top of his class in 1774. At his commencement ceremony, he gave a valedictory address on the necessity of the freedom of religious worship. He moved from Providence to Philadelphia, where he studied medicine. One of his mentors in this field was Benjamin Rush. Binney married Mary Woodrow in 1777 and they had four children, one of whom, Horace Binney, served in the U.S. House of Representatives.

Binney joined the US Army during the Revolutionary War as a hospital surgeon, treating wounded soldiers at Valley Forge in the winter of 1777–1778. While working as an army surgeon in Philadelphia in 1783, a soldier known as Robert Shirtliff was brought to his hospital with a fever. Dr. Binney discovered that Shirtliff was in fact a woman named Deborah Sampson, who had disguised herself to enlist. Binney wrote a note to her superior officer, General John Paterson, explaining what he had found, and "Robert Shirtliff" was honorably discharged.

Binney was elected as a member of the American Philosophical Society in 1784.

== Later years and death ==
After the war, Binney established a medical practice in Philadelphia, but years of military service had weakened his health. After taking a turn for the worse 1787, he travelled to Berkeley Springs, Virginia to rest and recover. He died on his journey back to Philadelphia in June 1787.

He is buried in the Christ Church Burial Ground in Philadelphia.
