= James Harper (Pennsylvania politician) =

American politician (1780-1873)

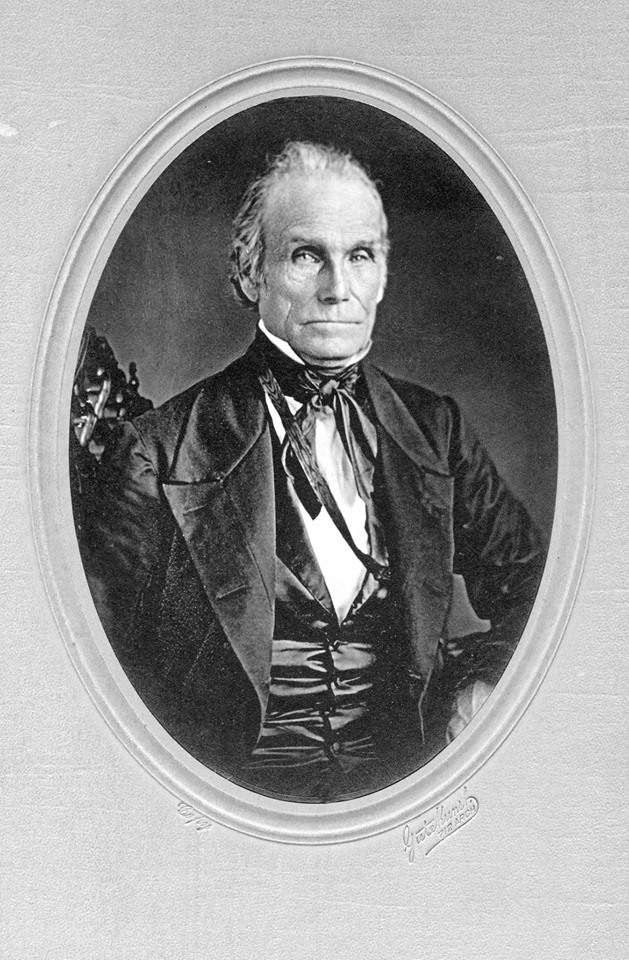
- James Harper around 1870, portrait photograph by Frederick Gutekunst.

Member of the U.S. House of Representatives from Pennsylvania's 2nd district
- In office March 4, 1833 – March 3, 1837
- Preceded by: Henry Horn
- Succeeded by: See below

Personal details
- Born: March 28, 1780 Castlederg, County Tyrone, Kingdom of Ireland
- Died: March 31, 1873 (aged 93) Philadelphia, Pennsylvania, U.S.
- Resting place: Laurel Hill Cemetery, Philadelphia, Pennsylvania, U.S.
- Party: Anti-Jacksonian

James Harper (March 28, 1780 – March 31, 1873) was an Irish-American politician who served as a National Republican member of the U.S. House of Representatives for Pennsylvania's 2nd congressional district from 1833 to 1837.

He owned a brick manufacturing business, a wholesale grocery trade and developed the Philadelphia neighborhood now known as Rittenhouse Square.

== Early life ==
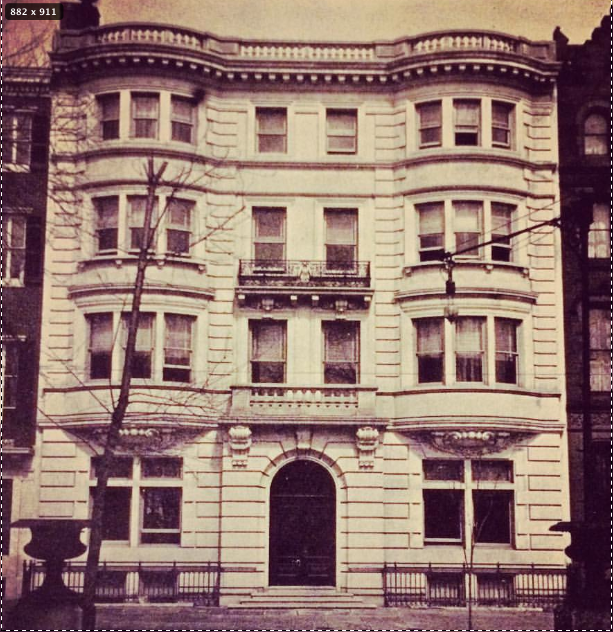
Harper's house at 1811 Walnut Street became the home of the Rittenhouse Club following his death. The façade, updated in 1901 by Newman Woodman & Harris architects, still graces Philadelphia's Rittenhouse Square.

Harper was born on March 28, 1780, in Castlederg, County Tyrone in Ireland. As a youth, he immigrated to the United States with his parents, and settled in Philadelphia.

== Career ==
Harper rose to prominence in commerce through the manufacture of brick and, from 1820 to 1830, in the wholesale grocery trade.

He was a Freemason, and was elected to the position of Grand Master of Pennsylvania in 1824. As Grand Master, he hosted fellow mason the Marquis de Lafayette during de Lafayette's visit to the United States in 1825.

=== U.S. Congressman ===
In 1832, Harper was elected to the United States Congress as a National Republican (Anti-Jacksonian), and represented Pennsylvania's 2nd congressional district in the Twenty-third and Twenty-fourth Congresses. Letters he sent from Washington, D.C., some of which have been preserved by the Historical Society of Pennsylvania, reflect a disgust with what Harper saw as an endemic of corruption by Andrew Jackson and his administration.

In Congress, he allied himself with Henry Clay, and followed Clay in commissioning his portrait from the Philadelphia painter John Neagle.

Harper chose not to stand for reelection in 1836.

=== Rittenhouse Square ===
Following his retirement from Congress, Harper continued in the manufacture of brick, and branched out into real estate speculation and urban development. He bought the north side of Philadelphia's then undeveloped Rittenhouse Square and built a fine house for himself at 1811 Walnut Street around 1840. His mansion set a patrician residential tone for the square and he sold off the remaining lots at profit. The front part of his house, sold after his death to the Social Art Club, an exclusive men's club that renamed itself the Rittenhouse Club, still stands behind the 1901 façade that the club added.

In Philadelphia, Harper was a member of the Board of Guardians of the Poor and of the Board of Prison Inspectors. A patron of science, Harper was one of the founders of the Franklin Institute in 1824, and a delegate to the Great Exhibition of the Works of Industry of all Nations, often called the Crystal Palace Exhibition in London in 1851.

== Personal life ==
Harper was a pewholder at St. Stephen's Episcopal Church. He married Charlotte Sloan Alford, a member of an established Pennsylvania Quaker family.

== Death ==
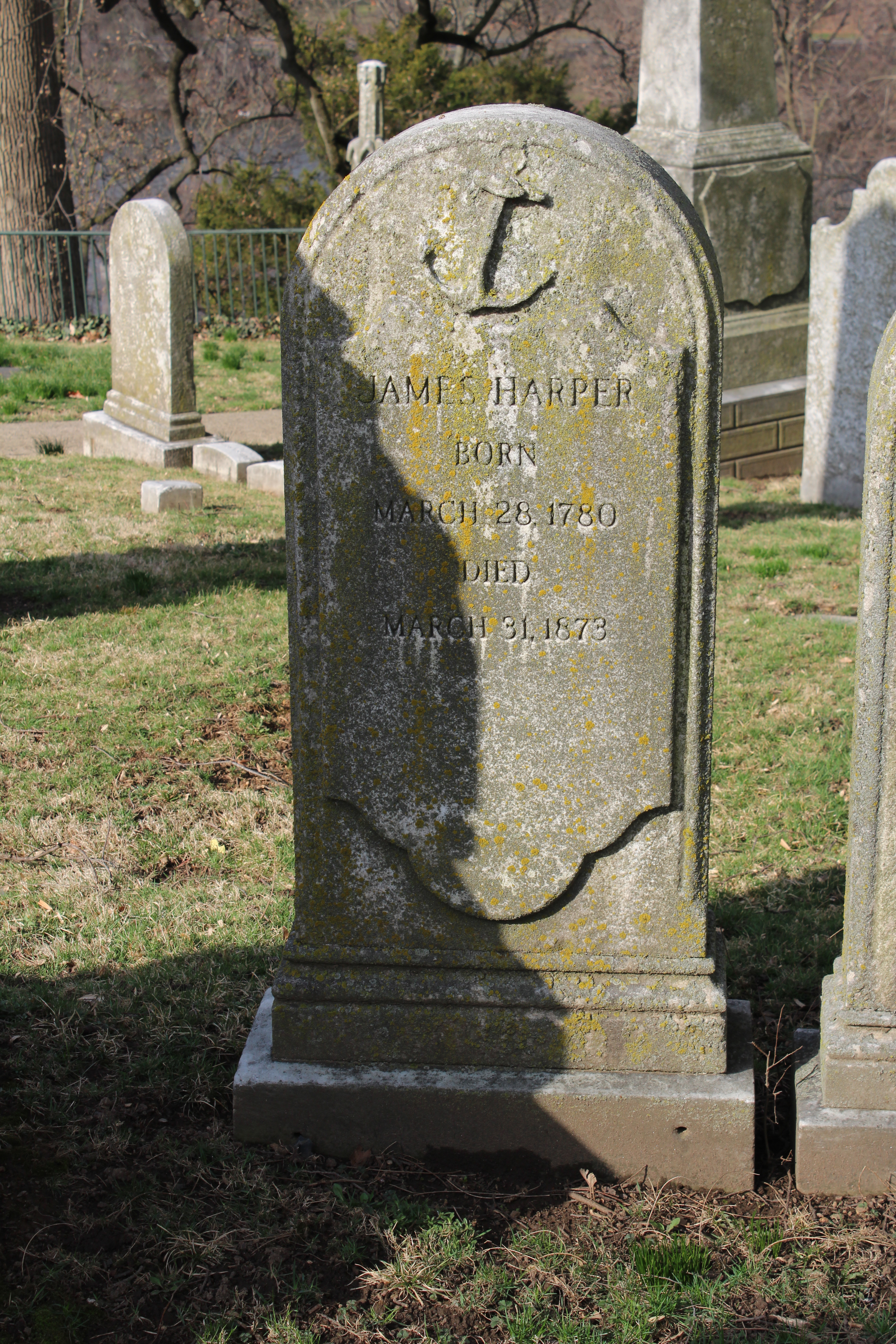
James Harper grave in Laurel Hill Cemetery

Harper died in Philadelphia on March 31, 1873, and was interred in Laurel Hill Cemetery.

== Legacy ==
The Harper, a 24-story luxury apartment and Harper's Garden, a bar and restaurant, both in the Rittenhouse Square neighborhood of Philadelphia, were named in his honor.

Of his ten children, eight survived to adulthood and several of those entered public life: Alexander J. Harper was President of the Philadelphia City Council, Benjamin West Harper (named after Charlotte Harper's relative Benjamin West) was a businessman and lieutenant colonel in the Pennsylvania National Guard, and Thomas Scott Harper was a physician and president of the Medical Board of Philadelphia.

== Citations ==
U.S. House of Representatives
Preceded by Henry Horn	Member of the U.S. House of Representatives from Pennsylvania's 2nd congressional district 1833–1837; 1833-1835 alongside: Horace Binney; 1835-1837 alongside Joseph R. Ingersoll	Succeeded by John Sergeant and George Washington Toland
