= Louis H. Carpenter =

19th and early 20th-century US Army brigadier general

Louis Henry Carpenter
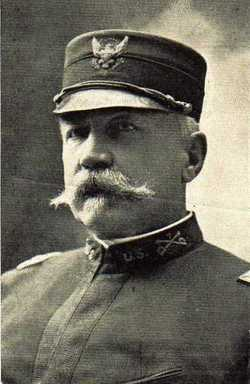
- Brigadier General Louis H. Carpenter, 5th Cavalry
- Born: February 11, 1839; Glassboro, New Jersey, US
- Died: January 21, 1916 (aged 76); Philadelphia, Pennsylvania, US
- Burial place: Trinity Episcopal Church New Cemetery, Swedesboro, New Jersey
- Relatives: James Edward Carpenter (brother)
- Military career
- Allegiance: United States
- Branch: Department of War–Army
- Service years: 1861–1899
- Rank: Brigadier General
- Nickname: L. Henry
- Commands: 5th US Colored Cavalry 1865–1866; 1st Division, 3rd Corps at Chickamauga in May 1898; 3rd Division, 4th Corps at Tampa, Florida later in 1898; Military Governor of the province of Puerto Principe, Cuba until June 1899.
- Conflicts: American Civil War: 14 major campaigns (1861–1865); Indian Wars Spanish–American War
- Other work: writer and speaker

Louis Henry Carpenter (February 11, 1839 – January 21, 1916) was a United States Army brigadier general and a recipient of the Medal of Honor for his actions in the American Indian Wars.

He dropped out of his junior year at Dickinson College to enlist in the Union Army at the beginning of the American Civil War in 1861. First serving as a private, he was commissioned as an officer the following year. During the American Civil War, he participated in at least fourteen campaigns, primarily with the 6th U.S. Cavalry Regiment and as regimental commander of the 5th U.S. Colored Cavalry Regiment. By the end of the Civil War, Carpenter held the rank of brevet lieutenant colonel, colonel of volunteers, and also received a commission as first lieutenant in the Regular United States Army.

Carpenter received the Medal of Honor for his actions during the Indian Wars while serving with the Buffalo Soldiers of the 10th U.S. Cavalry. He was noted several times for gallantry in official dispatches.

After the Civil War and until his transfer back East in 1887, he served primarily on the western frontier. He engaged in warfare with many Native American tribes, dealt with many types of renegades, and explored vast areas of uncharted territory from Texas to Arizona. During the Spanish–American War, he commanded an occupation force. He was appointed as the first military governor of Puerto Principe, Cuba. After 38 continuous years of service to his country, he retired from the Army on October 19, 1899, as a brigadier general. After his retirement, he became a speaker and a writer.

== Early life and family ==
Louis H. Carpenter was a direct descendant (great-great-great-grandson) of immigrant Samuel Carpenter (November 4, 1649 Horsham, Sussex, England–April 10, 1714 Philadelphia, Pennsylvania). He came to the British colonies in North America in early 1683 by way of Barbados.

The eldest son of eight children born to Edward Carpenter 2nd and Anna Maria (Mary) Howey, Carpenter was born in Glassboro, New Jersey. In 1843, his family moved to Philadelphia, where they attended Trinity Episcopal Church in West Philadelphia. (Note: Rivera, Edwin. "Then and Now Trinity Episcopal Church". This site was redeveloped as the Mario Lanza Park. The Church once stood west of Second Street, between Catharine and Queen streets. This Church was consecrated in 1822, and closed in 1908 as the neighborhood demographics changed. It was razed by 1917 and the site redeveloped as the new "Queen Park", which opened in late 1918. The park was renamed on September 29, 1967, in memory of Mario Lanza (1921–1959) one of Philadelphia's most beloved singers and film stars.) L. Henry Carpenter attended A. B. Central High School in Philadelphia in 1856 and started attending the Student University of Pennsylvania in 1859.

His younger brother, James Edward Carpenter, served in the Union army as a private in the Eighth Pennsylvania Cavalry and later was commissioned a second lieutenant. He later became a first lieutenant, captain then a brevet major of volunteers.

== Military service ==
=== American Civil War ===
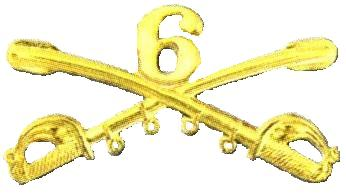
6th Regiment United States Cavalry insignia

In July 1861, during his junior year, Carpenter dropped out of Dickinson College and joined the "Fighting Sixth" Cavalry Regiment. He became a private in the Union Army, which later became known as the Army of the Potomac. Carpenter was trained as an infantry soldier, who was also capable of riding a horse to the battlefield, and as a mounted scout. As a "horse soldier", Carpenter and others like him had a steep learning curve; it proved difficult and frustrating during the first year of the conflict. He participated in the Peninsula Campaign and chased Jeb Stuart's cavalry, which went completely around the Union Army (June 13–15, 1862). The Union cavalry commanders and men were nonplussed by the Confederates, who mounted a superior cavalry in the early days of the war.

Rapid expansion of the Union cavalry in the East was chaotic. At the beginning of the Civil War, officers were elected by the men or appointed politically; they also earned office by paying for and supplying units. This resulted in many misguided and inept commanders. The tools and techniques of pre-war cavalry often seemed inadequate, resulting in a steep learning curve that was costly in men and supplies. Slowly out of the chaos came the tactics and leaders who proved worthy of the challenge. Union "horse soldiers" became cavalry troopers under this tough regimen and proven adept, dismounted and mounted on horseback, with their carbines, pistols, sabers and confident under their battle-proven leaders.

After the Seven Days Battles (June 25 to July 1, 1862), Carpenter was commissioned as a second lieutenant in the Regular Army, 6th U. S. Cavalry, on July 17, 1862, for meritorious actions and leadership.

==== Gettysburg campaign ====
The Gettysburg campaign was a series of engagements before and after the Battle of Gettysburg. To better understand Carpenter's role within the military organization, the following brief is provided. For more details, see Gettysburg Union order of battle.

- The Army of the Potomac was initially under Major General Joseph Hooker then under Major General George G. Meade on June 28, 1863.
- The Cavalry Corps was commanded by Major General Alfred Pleasonton, with divisions commanded by Brigadier Generals John Buford, David McM. Gregg, and H. Judson Kilpatrick.

Division	Brigade	Regiments and Others
First Division: BG John Buford (2,748)
First Division: BG John Buford (2,748)	Reserve Brigade: BG Wesley Merritt	6th Pennsylvania Cavalry: Maj James H. Haseltine; 1st US: Capt Richard S. C. Lord; 2nd US: Capt Theophilus F. Rodenbough; 5th US: Capt Julius W. Mason; 6th US: Maj Samuel H. Starr, Lt Louis H. Carpenter, Lt Nicholas Nolan, Capt Ira W. Claflin

The following list is the 6th US Cavalry Regiment's documented battles and engagements of June and July 1863 which Carpenter participated. These battle were pivotal for Carpenter. He was a company commander until July 3 then acting executive officer of his regiment after that.

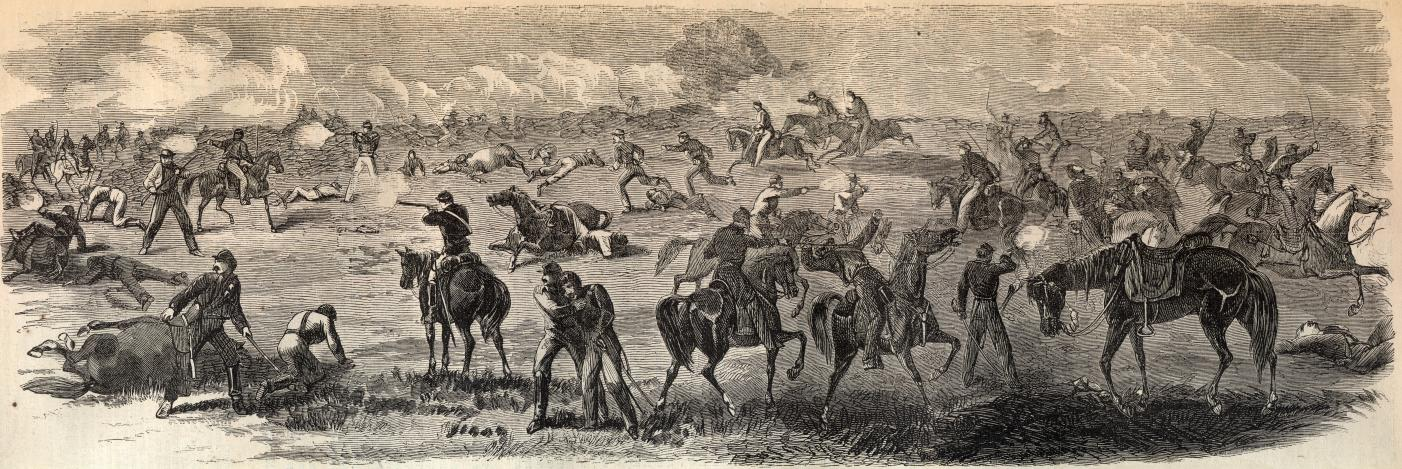
The Battle of Upperville: Harper's Weekly, issue date July 18, 1863.

- Beverly Ford, Virginia, June 9, at the Battle of Brandy Station. The 6th was under Buford's right wing.
- Benton's Mill, Virginia, June 17, an engagement near Middleburg.
- Middleburg, Virginia, June 21, at the Battle of Middleburg.
- Upperville, Virginia, June 21, at the Battle of Upperville.
- Fairfield, Pennsylvania, July 3, at the Battle of Fairfield.
- Williamsport, Maryland, July 6, an engagement.
- Funkstown, Maryland, July 7, a small engagement.
- Boonesboro, Maryland, July 8 and 9, at the Battle of Boonesboro.
- Funkstown, Maryland, July 10, at the Battle of Funkstown.

===== Battle of Brandy Station =====
On June 9, 1863, opposing cavalry forces met at Brandy Station, near Culpeper, Virginia. The 9,500 Confederate cavalrymen under Major General J.E.B. Stuart were surprised at dawn by Major General Alfred Pleasonton's combined arms force of two cavalry divisions of some 8,000 cavalry troops (including the 6th U.S. Cavalry Regiment and Carpenter with his Company H) and 3,000 infantry. Stuart barely repulsed the Union attack and required more time to reorganize and rearm. This inconclusive battle was the largest predominantly cavalry engagement of the Civil War to that time. This battle proved for the first time that the Union horse soldiers, like Carpenter, were equal to their Southern counterparts.

===== Battle of Fairfield =====
On July 3, 1863, reports of a slow moving Confederate wagon train in the vicinity of Fairfield, Pennsylvania, attracted the attention of newly commissioned Union Brigadier General Wesley Merritt of the Reserve Brigade, First Division, Cavalry Corps. He ordered the 6th U.S. Cavalry under Major Samuel H. Starr to scout Fairfield and locate the wagons, resulting in the Battle of Fairfield.

Carpenter's next action was with Major Starr on July 3, 1863. Starr had his 400 troopers dismount in a field and an orchard on both sides of the road near Fairfield. Union troopers directed by their officers took up hasty defensive positions on this slight ridge. Carpenter's troops and others threw back a mounted charge of the 7th Virginia Cavalry, just as the Confederate Chew's Battery unlimbered and opened fire on the Federal cavalrymen. Supported by the 6th Virginia Cavalry, the 7th Virginia charged again, clearing Starr's force off the ridge and inflicting heavy losses. General "Grumble" Jones, outnumbering the Union forces by more than 2 to 1, pursued the retreating Federals for three miles to the Fairfield Gap, but was unable to eliminate his quarry. Major Starr who was wounded in the first attack was unable to escape and was captured. Small groups of the 6th Cavalry," ... reformed several miles from the field of action by Lt. Louis H. Carpenter," harassed the Virginia troopers giving the impression of the vanguard of a much larger force. Carpenter became then became the acting executive officer of the Regiment.

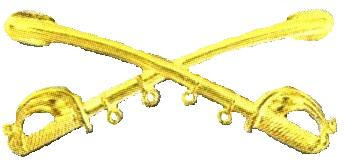
United States Cavalry branch insignia

Carpenter, in this fight with others of his small regiment at Fairfield, stood against two of the crack brigades of Stuart's cavalry. The 6th Cavalry's stand was considered one of the most gallant in its history and helped influence the outcome the battles being fought around Gettysburg. While the 6th Cavalry regiment was cut to pieces, it fought so well that its squadrons were regarded as the advance of a large body of troops. The senior officer of those brigades was later criticized severely for being delayed by such an inferior force. Had the 6th Cavalry regiment not made their stand, the two brigades of Virginians could have caused serious problems to the Union rear areas.

Lieutenant Carpenter, of Troop H, was one of only three officers of the 6th U.S. Cavalry to escape from the deadly melee at Fairfield on July 3, 1863. Private George Crawford Platt, later Sergeant, an Irish immigrant serving in Carpenter's Troop H, received the Medal of Honor on July 12, 1895, for his actions that day at Fairfield. His citation reads, "Seized the regimental flag upon the death of the standard bearer in a hand-to-hand fight and prevented it from falling into the hands of the enemy." His "commander", as an eyewitness, documented Private Platt's "beyond the call of duty" behavior that day. Carpenter was brevetted from second lieutenant to first lieutenant for his gallant and meritorious conduct for his actions at Fairfield. During this time period, he was mentioned in official reports and dispatches.

==== Overland Campaign ====
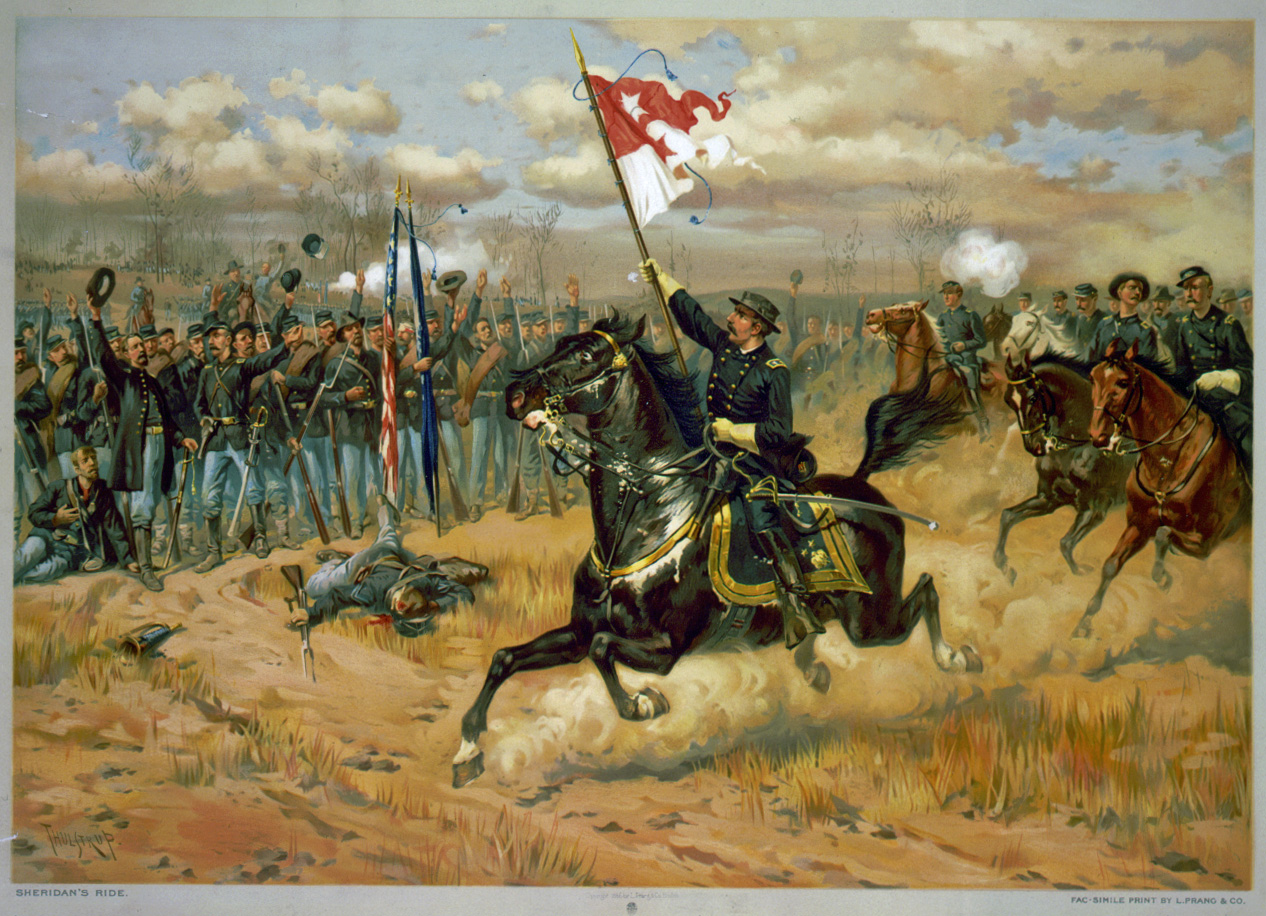
Sheridan's Ride, chromolithograph by Thure de Thulstrup. Carpenter is listed as being on the chesnut horse on the far right.

On April 5, 1864, Major General Philip Sheridan was appointed to command the Cavalry Corps of the Army of the Potomac under the newly promoted general-in-chief Lieutenant General Ulysses S. Grant. Carpenter became his Aide-de-camp similar to today's executive assistant known then as a Field & Staff (F&S) officer to the Cavalry Corps. It is unknown how much of an influence Carpenter had on Sheridan on the concept of deploying Union cavalry to become more effective and independent in roles such as long-range raids. Carpenter's treatise on "The Battle of Yellow Tavern" suggests that he had some influence on what was later called the Richmond or Sheridan's Raid.

On May 8, 1864, at the beginning of the Overland Campaign, Sheridan went over his immediate superior, Major General Meade's head and told Grant that if his Cavalry Corps were let loose to operate as an independent unit, he could defeat Confederate Major General J.E.B. Stuart. "Jeb" Stuart was the most prominent and able cavalry officer of the south. Grant was intrigued and convinced Meade of the value of Sheridan's request.

The May 1864 Battle of Yellow Tavern was the first of four major so called strategic raids. The others being the Trevilian in June 1864, the Wilson-Kautz in late June, and the First Deep Bottom in July 1864. Of all of these, only the Battle of Yellow Tavern can be considered a clear Union victory. The defeat and resulting death of "Jeb" Stuart made this clear during the first raid. At best, the follow-up raids diverted Confederate forces required to deal with them from where they were needed elsewhere. Despite what Carpenter and other supporters of Sheridan have written, further raids of this caliber were less than successful. And these raids may have even hindered the Union effort by the lack of reconnaissance and intelligence Sheridan could have otherwise provided. How long Carpenter served with Sheridan is not currently known. Carpenter is not mentioned in Sheridan's personal memoirs or other major books on Sheridan. Brevet Lieutenant Colonel Carpenter was promoted to first lieutenant in the Regular Army on September 28, 1864. He was then transferred the District of Kentucky, Department of Ohio and accepted a commission to lieutenant colonel of volunteers with the United States colored Troops.

==== 5th U.S. Colored Cavalry ====
Lieutenant Colonel of Volunteers L. Henry Carpenter arrived at Camp Nelson, Kentucky on October 1, 1864. The majority of 600 "colored" slaves, ex-slaves and freedmen of what would become the 5th United States Colored Cavalry (USCC) were absent. The men were then in the field being led by Lieutenant Colonel James S. Brisbin under Brevet Major General Stephen G. Burbridge preparing for an attack on Saltville, Virginia. The 5th USCC would not be officially organized until October 24, 1864.

==== First Battle of Saltville ====
In late September 1864, Burbridge led a raid into southwest Virginia against the salt works near the town of Saltville, Virginia as part of the Battle of Saltville on October 1, 1864. Burbridge controversially led white troops and some 600 mostly untrained black troops into that battle and, despite outstanding effort by the "coloured troops," the raid ultimately failed. Burbridge quickly retreated the next day. Wounded troops (black and white) were left behind on the field of battle. By October 3, an unknown number of surrendered and wounded Union soldiers were killed by Confederate regular, home guard and irregular soldiers, with special ire directed toward the black troops. To many this was a war crime and Champ Ferguson, a captain of partisan rangers, was later found guilty of murdering 53 white and black soldiers at the Battle of Saltville, and on October 20, 1865, he was hanged until dead. Ferguson and Henry Wirz were the only two Confederate soldiers during the Civil War tried for war crimes.

Union forces en route back to Camp Nelson had a brief engagement on October 21, 1864, at Harrodsburg, Kentucky. A few days later, Carpenter faced the defeated but defiant Union troops as they returned to Camp Nelson in October. The reports of "Black Flag" behavior toward the "colored troops" and their white officers frightened many men. And it was widely reported in the press both North and South.

==== Problems ====
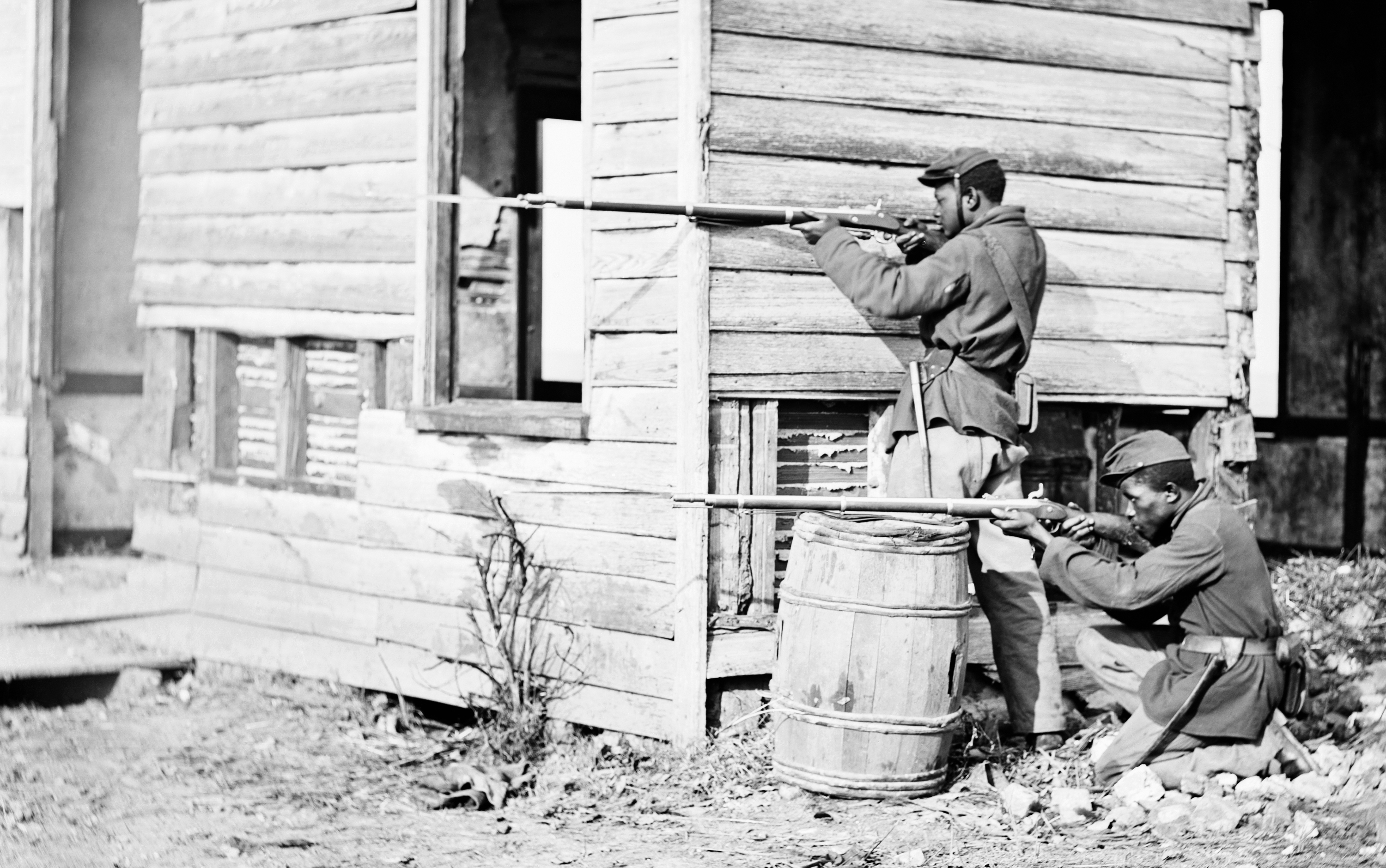
African-American Union soldiers at Dutch Gap, November 1864. Typical Union uniform and Enfield rifles used by "Colored" soldiers.

Carpenter became the executive officer of the 5th USCC in charge of training and getting the African-American recruits ready for combat. Basic drill, weapon training and conditioning helped build confidence and preparedness. Carpenter faced another serious problem. Non-commissioned officers were to be chosen from the ranks and with almost an entire regiment of recent ex-slaves, Carpenter found it difficult to find men literate enough to handle the tasks assigned to sergeants. "Scarcely any of the Colored men enlisted into this regiment can read or write," wrote Carpenter, to Captain O. Bates Dickson in a letter.

Carpenter's solution, which was granted by his superiors, involved placing literate white non-commissioned officers among the "colored sergeants." This combined with a literacy program for African-American NCOs corrected the problem in time.

Another problem was the rifles issued to the 5th USCC. These were muzzle loaded Enfield infantry rifles unsuited for mounted use because they could not be loaded on horseback. Carpenter taught tactics that involved dismounted fighting, going back to the concept of "mounted infantry" who dismounted to fight.

A final problem was white officers promoted from the ranks who were "unsuited" to command "colored troops." Despite efforts of training by Carpenter and others, attrition was the only real solution for these junior officers.

==== Stoneman's 1864 Winter Raid ====
In December 1864, General George Stoneman ordered the 5th USCC to participate in a raid from East Tennessee into southwestern Virginia. This resulted in engagements that involved the 5th USCC at Hopkinsville, Kentucky on December 12, Kingsport, Tennessee on December 13, the Battle of Marion near Marion, Virginia on December 17 & 18, and the second Battle of Saltville on December 20 & 21 near Saltville, Virginia. All were considered Union victories.

During the Battle of Marion, Division Commander Stephen G. Burbridge ordered the 5th USCC between two white units on the left flank of the Union line. Lieutenant Colonel James S. Brisbin and his second in command, Carpenter, led their dismounted soldiers forward toward the Confederate defensive works. The Confederates opened heavy fire upon the advancing Union troops that included four ten pound Parrott rifled cannons. The first Union charge wavered and fell back. Carpenter was seen giving clear orders to reform and rallied his men. With a mighty yell the 5th USCC rushed forward toward the breastworks but could not break the defensive line. Carpenter ordered the men to dig in and night fell. Volunteers went out between lines to rescue the wounded.

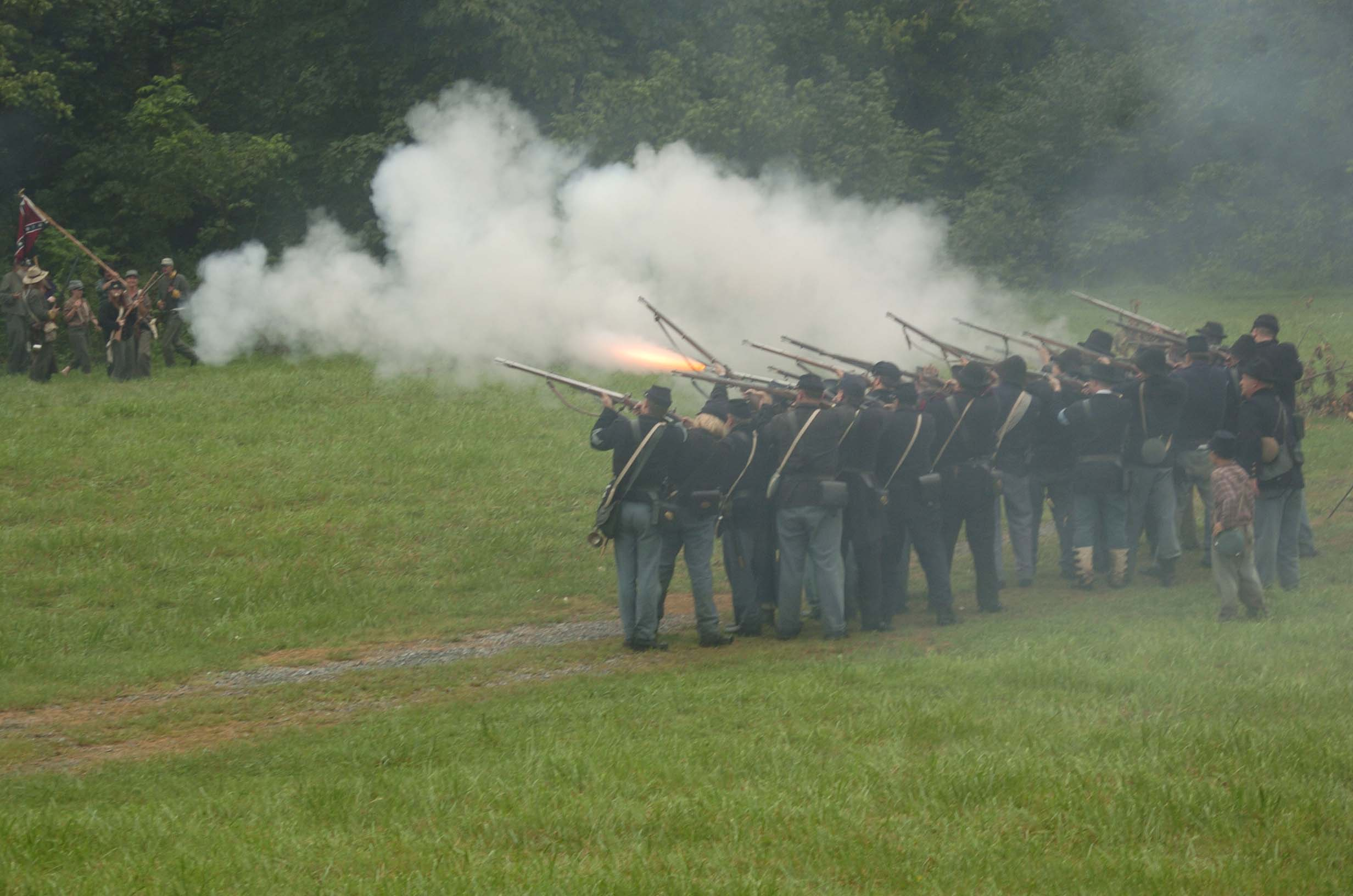
Union re-enactors recreate the Battle of Saltville in Saltville, Virginia on August 20, 2006.

On December 18, the morning was cold and rainy with a light fog. The second day began as a copy of the first with multiple Union charges. The Union center was able to breach the center of the Confederate breastworks but were pushed out by a Rebel counterattack. Carpenter led a mounted rescue force of colored soldiers to save white soldiers trapped near a cover bridge on the left flank. Carpenter made several attempts but could not rescue the soldiers. Most of those trapped soldiers would be captured later that afternoon, but released before giving their parole. Later that day the Confederate reinforcements delivered a wild rebel yelling charge on the Union left flank. The white unit adjacent to the 5th USCC was completely routed and the 5th USCC flank was threatened. Ordered to fall back, Carpenter and Brisbin tried to maintain an orderly retreat. Many "colored soldiers" remembering the murder of their comrades during the first battle of Saltville broke ranks to rescue their wounded comrades. The retreat threatened to become a rout. About 4 PM, Union reinforcements arrived and bolstered the Union line. During the night, Confederate forces were forced to retire due to the lack of ammunition. The next day Union forces buried the dead and helped the wounded. The costly victory marked the highpoint of Stoneman's raid.

On the afternoon of December 20, Union forces attacked Saltville, Virginia. Confederate forces were overwhelmed when the 5th & 6th USCC entered the fray with a cold vengeance. Outnumbered Confederate forces retreated and awaited promised reinforcements. Union forces hastily attempted to destroy the vital salt works. They destroyed about one third of the boiling kettles and most evaporating sheds. They also damaged portions of the Virginia & Tennessee railroad. But they failed to destroy or damage the actual salt wells. General Stoneman claimed a victory and retreated out of Virginia before Confederate forces could completely surround him. Carpenter's role is strangely missing from letters and other documents that simply note that he was there. Within three months, the saltworks were back in full production. Carpenter later wrote a long letter home about this battle and how his men responded.

==== Ambush at Simpsonville ====
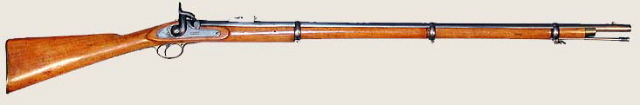
1853 Enfield Rifle-Musket was the second most used infantry weapon used in the Civil War. It was 55 inches (1,400 mm) long and fired a .577 calibre Minié-type lead ball projectile, propelled by black powder and a copper percussion cap. Because it was a muzzle-loading weapon, it was unsuited for cavalry use.

On January 23, 1865, 80 "colored" troops of Company E, 5th US Colored Cavalry, under command of 2nd Lieutenant Augustus Flint, were assigned to move almost a thousand head of cattle from Camp Nelson to the stock yard at Louisville, Kentucky. The men were mostly assigned to the front and rear of the spread out herd of cattle. About 41 men were bringing up the rear on January 25 near Simpsonville, when they were ambushed by Confederate guerrillas. Very few of the Union troops were able to fire their muzzle-loaded Enfield infantry rifles, due to fouled powder. The guerrillas were armed with 6-shot revolvers, and most carried two or more. As Confederates quickly closed the distance, almost all of the "colored soldiers" bringing up the rear were wounded or dismounted. Only two escaped harm, one by playing dead, and the other hiding under an overturned wagon box. The forward group panicked and fled.

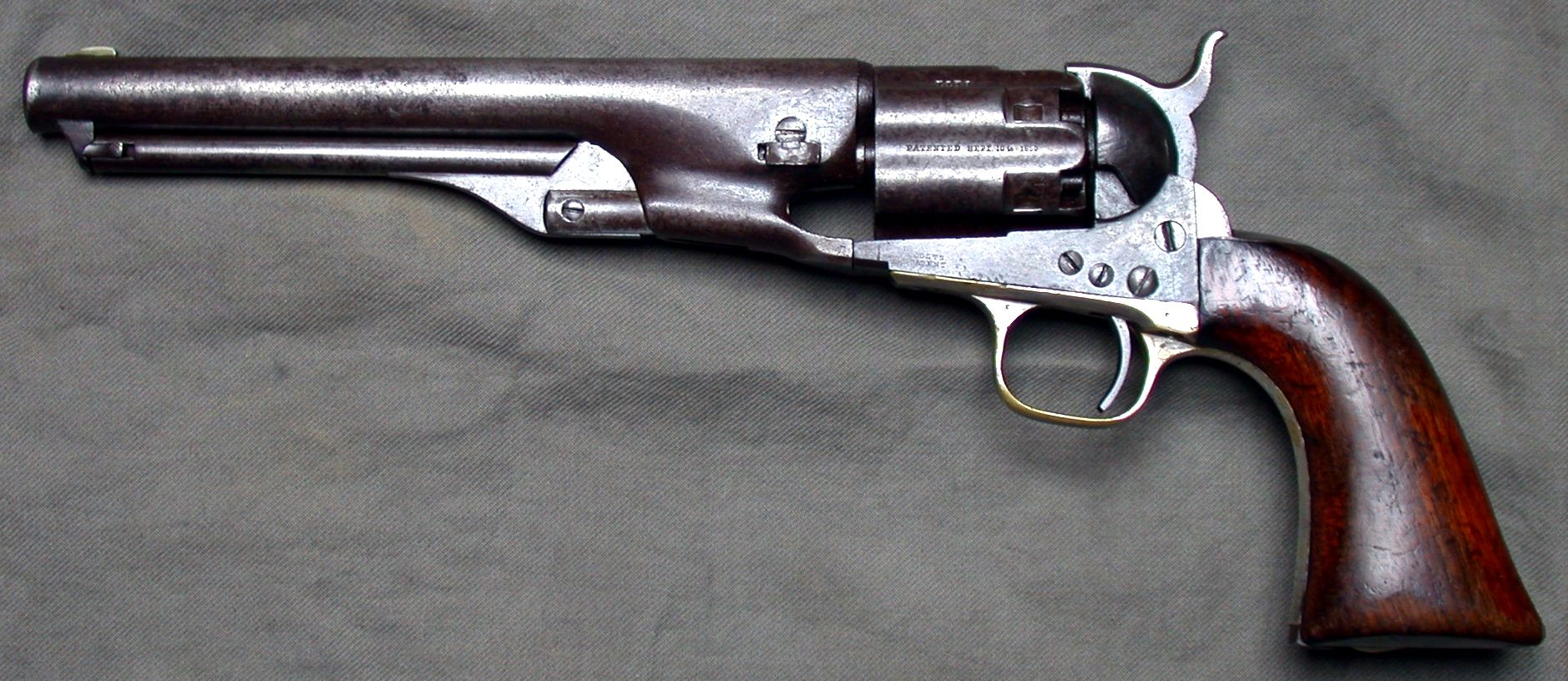
The Colt .44-caliber "Army" Model was one of the most widely used revolvers of the Civil War. It had a six-shot, rotating cylinder, and fired a 0.454-inch-diameter (11.5 mm) round lead ball projectile, propelled by black powder and a copper percussion cap.

About an hour after the ambush, local citizens found 15 dead and 20 wounded soldiers stretched out on and near the road. Four more soldiers were later found dead of wounds or of exposure nearby. The men of Simpsonville took 20 wounded men back to town, 8 of the men so severely wounded they were not expected to live. A total of six soldiers died en route or in Louisville. Later it was determined that 19 Union soldiers had been murdered trying to surrender or after being disarmed. The remainder of the Union wounded were left to die in the freezing cold. Three soldiers remained missing in the final accounting. Flint, who was in town during the ambush, fled to Louisville. Authorities telegraphed Camp Nelson, and Carpenter immediately ordered ambulances, and a heavy escort was mounted. They arrived on scene on October 28 and took the surviving wounded to a hospital in Louisville. Locals reported what had happened and the boasts of the Confederate guerrillas, led by Captain Dick Taylor, who had murdered or shot many of the Union soldiers after they had been captured. The mass grave was located, and an effort was made to find the missing men. Carpenter wrote a report and documented the names of the known guerrillas and encouraged a hunt and their prosecution.

==== Command of the 5th USCC ====
In mid February 1865, Colonel James F. Wade regimental commander of the 6th USCC was promoted to brigadier general of volunteers and moved to Division duties. A reorganization of command of 5th & 6th USCC resulted. Brevet Lieutenant Colonel James S. Brisbin of the 5th USCC took over the 6th USCC and Carpenter took command of the 5th USCC Regiment. The 5th USCC regiment was attached to the 1st Division, District of Kentucky, Department of Ohio until February 1865. The regiment subsequently served under the Military District of Kentucky until December 1865 and the Department of Arkansas until March 20, 1866. During this later period of time the regiment performed scattered garrison duties and reportedly hunted rebel renegades.

==== End of the Civil War ====
Through the course of the Civil War, Carpenter served in at least 14 campaigns and over 150 battles related to them from the 1861 Peninsula Campaign, the 1862 Maryland Campaign, Campaign at Fredericksburg, the 1863 Gettysburg campaign, Chancellorsville (in Stoneman's raid to the rear of Lee's army), the 1864 The Wilderness and final battles in Kentucky and south-West Virginia.

==== Reconstruction ====
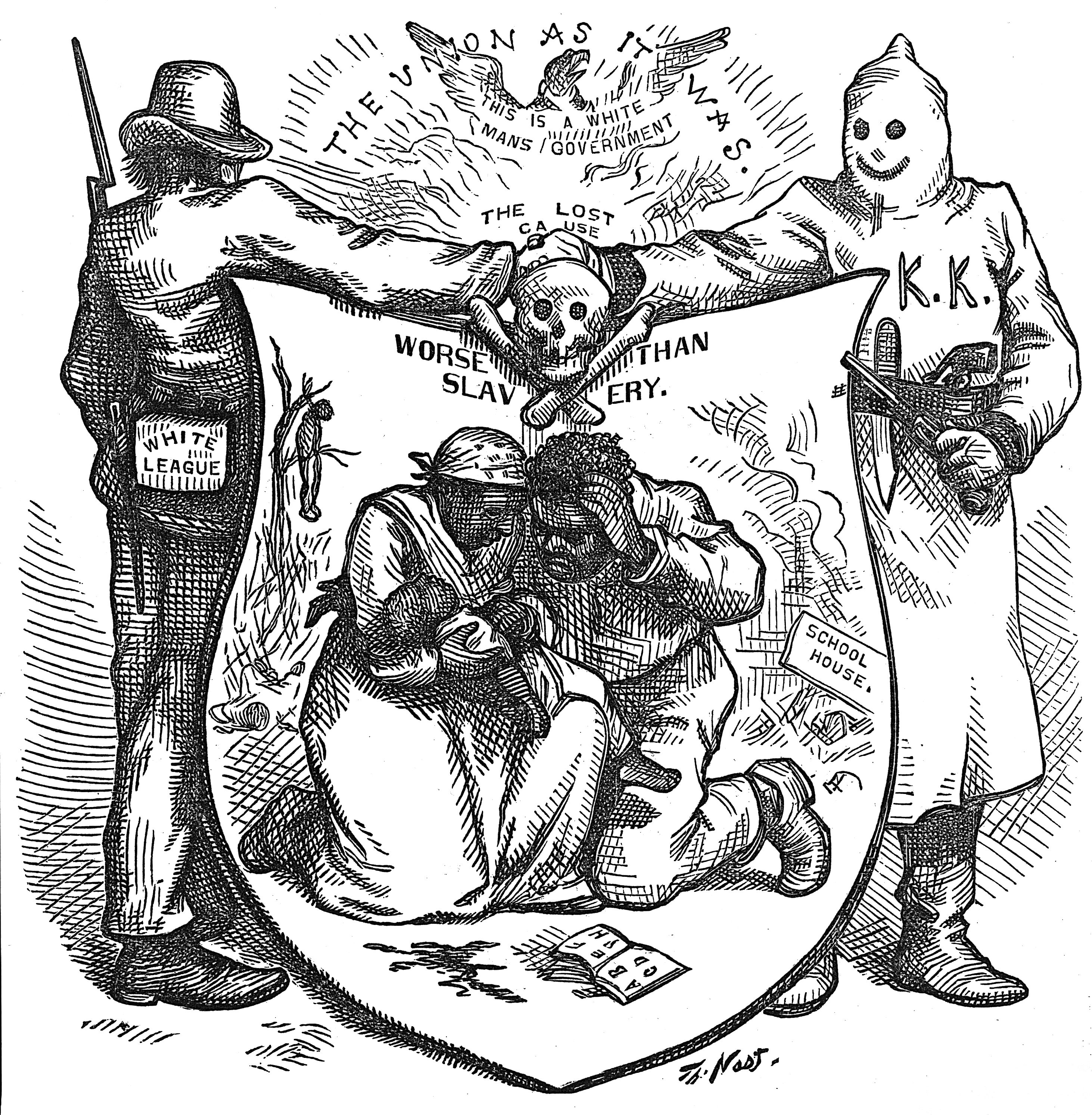
Harper's Weekly cartoon from October 1874 depicting White League and Klan opposition to Reconstruction.

After the fighting stopped and Reconstruction began, Carpenter did not go with the 6th Cavalry to Texas in October 1865, as reported in some historical sketches. Carpenter stayed in Arkansas with the 5th USCC until March 1866.

There was little or no fighting during the state of martial law imposed while the military closely supervised local government, enrolled freemen to vote, excluded former Confederate leaders for a period of time, supervised free elections, and tried to protect office holders and freedmen from the Ku Klux Klan and early versions of the White League violence. Carpenter and his men did face a low level of civil hostility and violence during this uneasy transition period by trying to keep the peace. Carpenter was promoted colonel of volunteers on November 2, 1865.

==== Battles of the 5th USCC ====
Summary of battles of the 5th USCC. All except the October 2 & 21, 1864 battles had Carpenter present in the command structure.

1864

October 2 – Saltville, Virginia – Battle of Saltville I

October 21 – Harrodsburg, Kentucky – an engagement

December 12 – Hopkinsville, Kentucky – an engagement

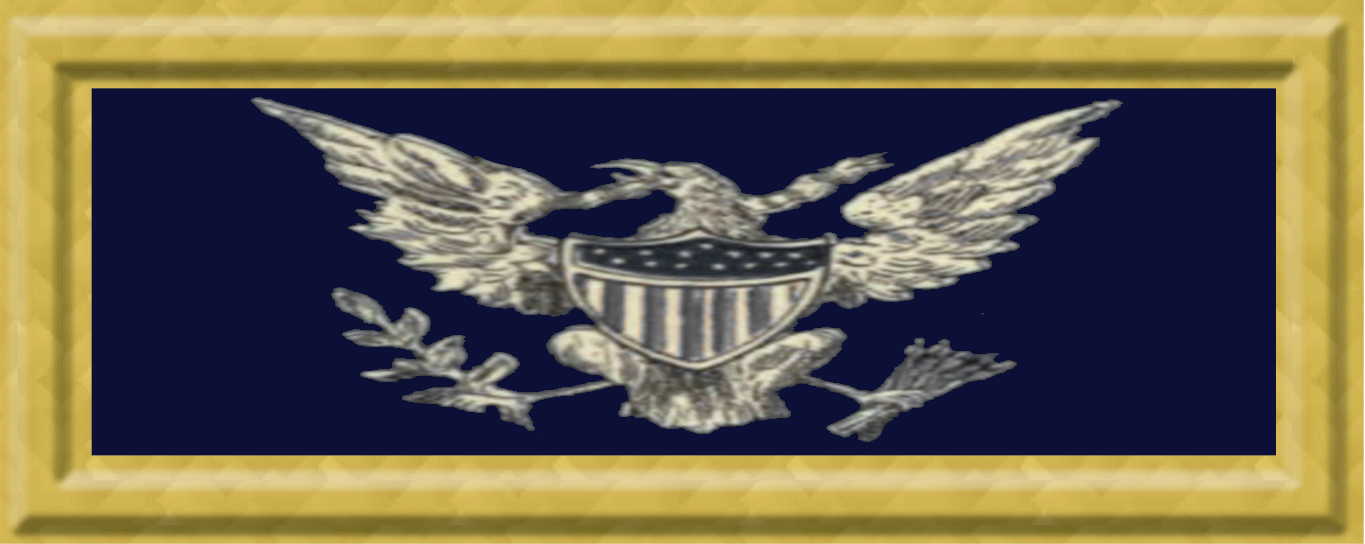
Union Officer shoulder board for the rank of colonel.

December 13 – Kingsport, Tennessee (flanking movement & skirmishing)

December 17–18, 1864, Marion, Virginia – Battle of Marion

December 20–21 – Saltville, Virginia – Battle of Saltville II

1865

January 25 – Simpsonville, KY – an ambush

==== Retirement of the 5th USCC ====
The 5th USCC Regimental Commander, Colonel of Volunteers, L. Henry Carpenter, had his final regimental review on March 16, 1866, in Helena, Arkansas. The names of 46 officers and men still listed officially as missing in action and presumed murdered between October 2 & 8, 1864 were read for a final time to the regiment. Then most of the officers, including Carpenter, were honorably discharged by ceremony. Over the next four days the men were mustered out and the regiment was officially retired on March 20, 1866. Official losses from October 24, 1864, to March 16, 1866, were 35 killed in action and 152 died in service from disease, wounds and other causes. After mustering out, Carpenter reverted to his Regular Army rank of first lieutenant and returned home to Philadelphia on leave. After his leave he reported to the new 10th United States Cavalry Regiment.

==== Loyal Legion ====
On January 2, 1867, Carpenter was elected as a companion of the Pennsylvania Commandery of the Military Order of the Loyal Legion of the United States (MOLLUS). He was assigned MOLLUS insignia number 433.

=== Indian Wars and frontier service ===
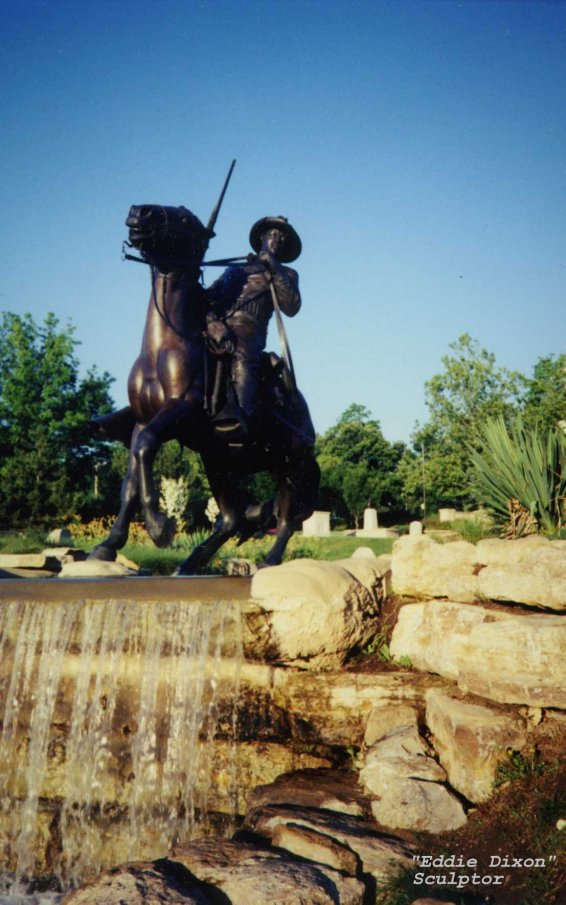
The Buffalo Soldier Monument at Fort Leavenworth, Kansas. It honors the African-Americans troopers and those who led them.

==== 10th Cavalry Regiment–Buffalo Soldiers ====
After the Civil War, Carpenter was serving as a first lieutenant in the Regular U.S. Army and volunteered for cavalry duty with "Negro Troops" that were being raised. The 10th U.S. Cavalry was formed at Fort Leavenworth, Kansas in 1866 as an all African-American regiment. By the end of July 1867, eight companies of enlisted men had been recruited from the Departments of Missouri, Arkansas, and the Platte. Life at Leavenworth was not pleasant for the 10th Cavalry. The fort's commander, who was openly opposed to African-Americans serving in the Regular Army, made life for the new troops difficult. Benjamin Grierson sought to have his regiment transferred, and subsequently received orders moving the regiment to Fort Riley, Kansas. This began on the morning of August 6, 1867 and was completed the next day in the afternoon of August 7.

Carpenter accepted the rank of captain in the Regular Army on July 28, 1866, and took command of the African American troops of "D" company, 10th U.S. Cavalry. The 10th U.S. Cavalry regiment was composed of black enlisted men and white officers, which was typical for that era. Carpenter was assigned to the newly formed Company H on July 21, 1867 (Note: Bigelow, John, page 290. "Troop H.–(horse) Color, black. Organized July 21, 1867. Captain L. H. Carpenter; Lieutenants T. J. Spencer and L. H. Orleman.") and served with these original "Buffalo Soldiers" for thirteen years of near continuous conflict with the Native Americans in the southwest United States. Carpenter was dispatched to Philadelphia to recruit non-commissioned officers in late summer and fall of 1867. (Note: Bigelow, John, "With a view to securing an intelligent set of men for the ranks the colonel had Captain Louis H. Carpenter, who was recruiting at Louisville, Kentucky, ordered to Philadelphia, Pa., to open a recruiting station there. Writing to Captain Carpenter, the colonel says, after referring to the captain's knowledge of Philadelphia: "I requested you to be sent there to recruit colored men sufficiently educated to fill the positions of noncommissioned officers, clerks and mechanics in the regiment. You will use the greatest care in your selection of recruits. Although sent to recruit men for the positions specified above, you will also enlist all superior men you can who will do credit to the regiment.") His efforts contributed to the high level of veteran soldiers who became the core non-commissioned officers of the 10th Cavalry.

Carpenter's men respected him, and his company had the lowest documented desertion rate of the Regular Army during his charge. He was known as being fair, firm, and consistent. He learned, saw and understood, the hardships and racial bigotry his men faced. After his service with the 10th, he campaigned and defended what his Buffalo Soldiers had done and could do. His ability to train and lead was notable and set a standard for all cavalry units.

==== Battle of Beecher Island ====
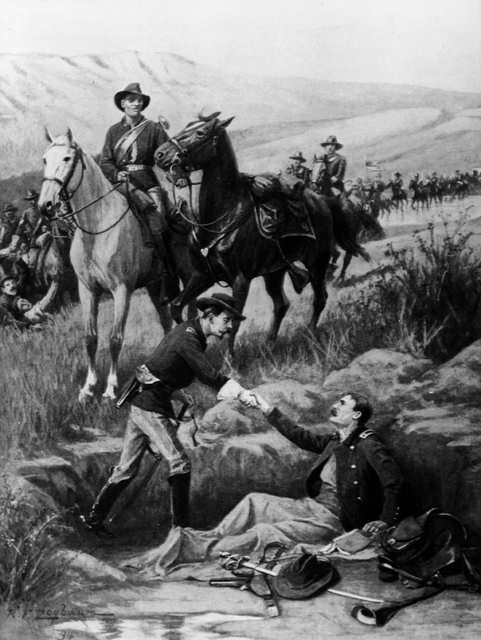
The Rescue A soldier offers aid to his wounded comrade after the Battle of Beecher Island. The Harper's article states that this is "Bvt. Col. Louis H. Carpenter greeting Lt. Col. G. A. Forsyth" who was twice wounded by gunfire and who had fractured his leg when his horse fell. Notice officer shoulder boards.

On September 17, 1868, Lieutenant Colonel G. A. Forsyth with a mounted party of 48 white scouts, was attacked at dawn. Forsyth, seeing no viable route for retreat, made a stand on a sandbar in the river. He was attacked by a force of about 200-300 Indian warriors on a sand island up the North Fork of the Republican River; this action became the Battle of Beecher Island. The Indians were primarily Cheyenne, supported by members of the Arapaho tribe under the Cheyenne War Chief Roman Nose, who was killed during the battle. Forsyth dispatched Simpson "Jack" Stilwell and Pierre Trudeau to seek help from Fort Wallace, more than 60 miles (97 km) away. They were both able to reach Fort Wallace where rescue plans were quickly made.

Three rescue parties went out on different routes to find the endangered party. The first, led by Lieutenant Colonel Carpenter in charge of Troop H & I of the 10th Cavalry Regiment, relieved Forsyth on September 25. Forsyth had been shot in the thigh, breaking his leg, and in the forehead. He was not expected to survive another day.

==== Battle of Beaver Creek ====
On October 14, 1868, two weeks after Carpenter had returned to Fort Wallace with the survivors of Forsyth's command, he was ordered out once again. Troops H and I of the 10th Cavalry sallied forth to escort Major Carr of the 5th Cavalry to his new command with supplies to Beaver Creek. Near there Carpenter's supply train and command was attacked by a force of about 500 Indians with no sign of the 5th Cavalry present.

Carpenter, seeking a more defensive posture closer to Beaver Creek, advanced for a short period then circled the supply wagons in a defensible area. This was possible because his mounted troopers fought a mobile delaying action. On his command, Carpenter's men rushed inside at the gallop. They dismounted and took up a defensive firing line at the gap between the wagons they had just entered.

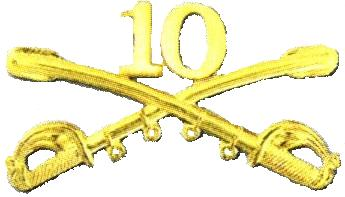
10th Regiment United States Cavalry insignia

On Carpenter's command, several massive volleys of aimed Spencer repeating rifles hit the front waves of the mounted Indians. The volleys decimated them as if hit by cannon filled with musket balls. A number of warriors, dismounted and using their ponies as bullet breaks, returned fire. Nearly all of these warriors died along with their ponies. Only three warriors made it to within fifty yards of the wagons before their demise. The Indians were so traumatized and demoralized by Carpenter's defense that they did not renew their attack.

Carpenter's troopers then accomplished their primary task by sending out scouts to find the location of the 5th Cavalry. This was done without further incident and they arrived back to Fort Wallace on October 21.

Carpenter's command had traveled some 230 miles in a week, routed some 500 mounted Indians, delivered the needed supplies with the new commander of the 5th Cavalry and completed all as effectively and professionally as any other command could do. For their gallantry in this fight on Beaver Creek, the officers and men of the "Buffalo Soldiers" were thanked by General Sheridan in a general field order and in official dispatches to the War Department in Washington. Captain Carpenter was brevetted Colonel." In 1898, for his efforts in September and October 1868, Carpenter became one of seven 10th Cavalry soldiers to be awarded the Medal of Honor during its service on the frontier.

==== Defense of the Wichita I ====
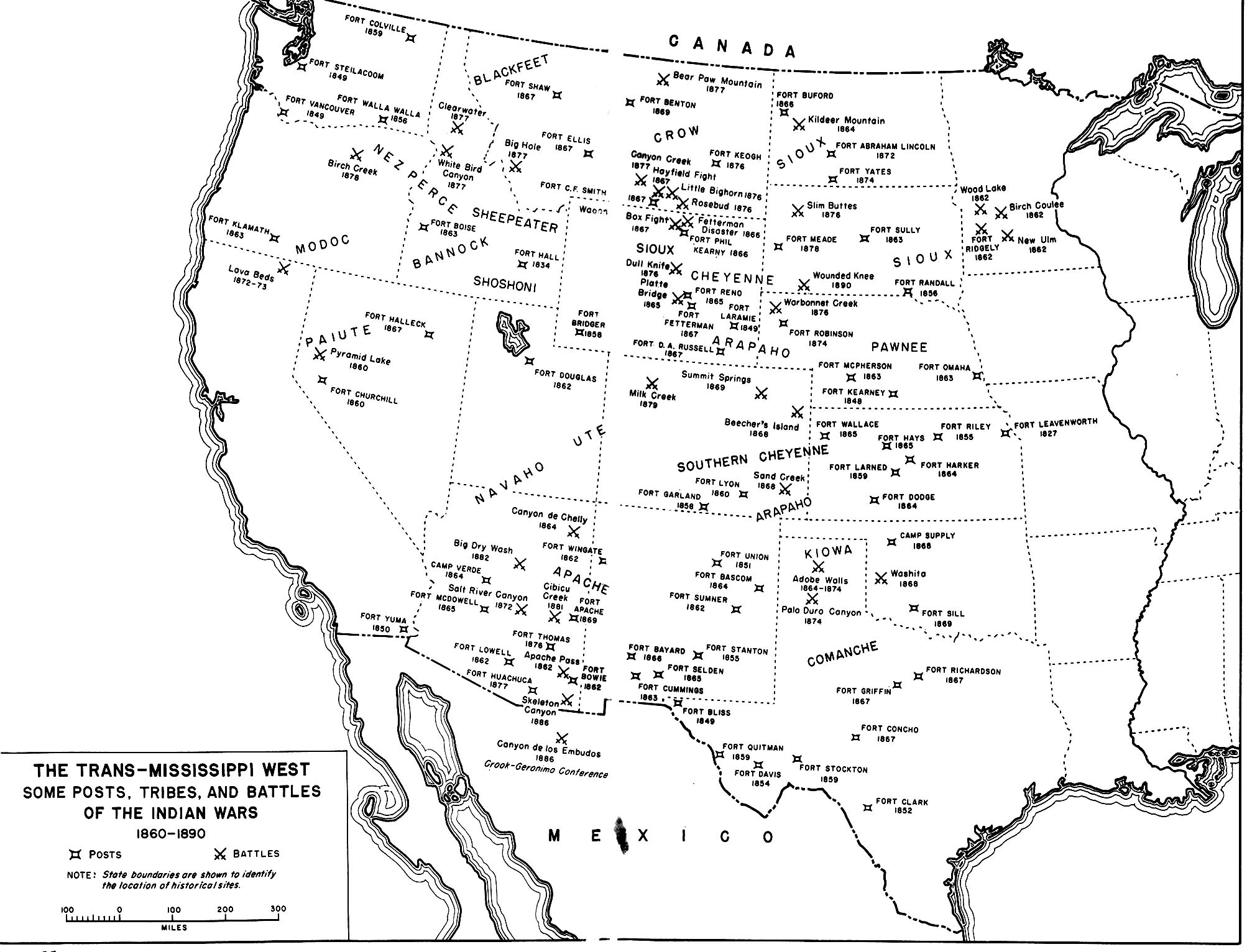
Western Indian Wars 1860 to 1890, battles, army posts, and the general location of tribes.

The 10th Regimental headquarters remained at Fort Gibson until March 31, 1869, when they moved to Camp Wichita, Indian Territory (now the state of Oklahoma). They arrived on April 12, 1869. Camp Wichita was an old Indian village inhabited by the Wichita tribe on the Anadarko Reservation. General Sheridan had selected a site nearby for a military post and Carpenter with the rest of the 10th Cavalry was ordered there to establish and build it. Some time in the following month of August, the post was given the name of Fort Sill. Civil War Brigadier General Joshua W. Sill was a classmate and friend of Sheridan who was killed in action in 1862.

On June 12, 1869, Camp Supply was attacked by a raiding party of Comanche intent on stealing cavalry mounts. The 3rd Infantry with Troops A & F of the 10th Cavalry pursued them, but were ambushed by the warriors. Carpenter with Troops H, I, & K flanked the Indians, forcing them to withdraw.

On August 22 & 23, 1869, Carpenter and other troopers became involved in a fierce attack by Kiowa and Naconee Indians, who were focused on destroying the buildings and settlement on the Anadarko Reservation. Carpenter, with Troops H and L, patrolled the area aggressively and engaged several groups of warriors who were setting prairie fires upwind of the settlement at different points. Further and increasingly violent assaults were made by the Native Americans, in numbers ranging from 50 to 500 at different points of the defensive lines. The decisive feature of the engagement was a charge made by Captain Carpenter's troopers. His men routed a body of over 150 warriors, who were about to take up a commanding position in rear of other defenders. On June 5, 1872, the 10th left Fort Sill to elements of the 3rd Infantry and proceeded back to Fort Gibson.

==== Satank, Satanta and Big Tree ====
In May 1871, Carpenter was involved in the capture and escort of the Kiowa warrior and medicine man Satank, along with the Kiowa War Chiefs Santana, and Big Tree at Fort Sill, Indian Territory, now in Oklahoma. General Sherman was present at the fort due to an inspection tour; also present was Colonel Benjamin Grierson. These three Native American leaders were the first to be tried, for raids (Warren Wagon Train Raid) and murder, in a United States civil court instead of a military court. This would deny them any vestige of rights as prisoners of war by being tried as any common criminal in the Court of the Thirteenth Judicial District of Texas in Jacksboro, Texas near Fort Richardson.

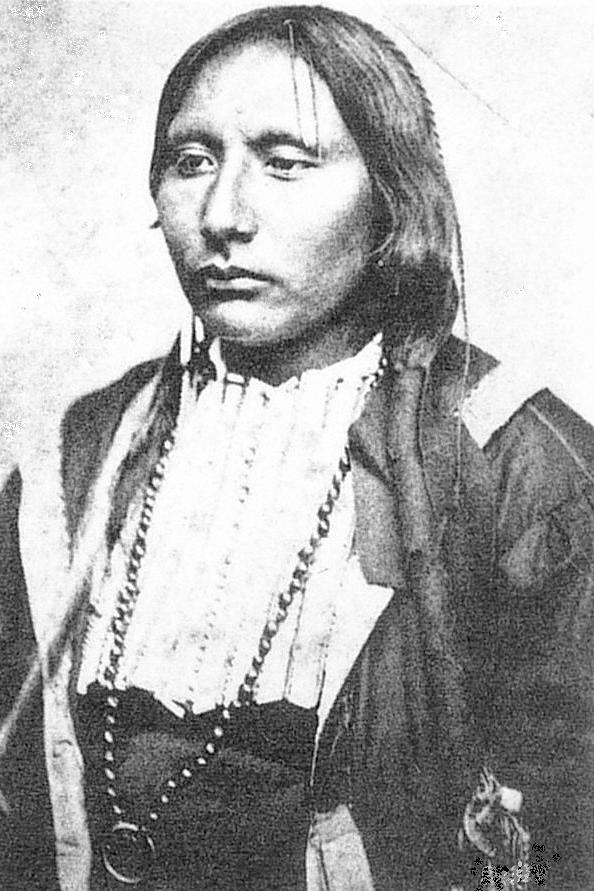
Big Tree, or Addoeette, a Kiowa chief, was one of three models for the Indian Head nickel.

The military leaders at the fort had been given written information from the Indian Agent regarding the killings during the raid. Plans were made to arrest the Indians involved. D Troop was hidden on foot behind the main office building. Carpenter had mounted troopers waiting nearby. Sherman and Grierson sat on the porch, reviewing the situation and waiting for the Indians to arrive. When the Indians came, they blatantly boasted of what they had done. After Sherman told the Indians they were under arrest, a signal was given and the dismounted troopers came forward with carbines and pistols in hand. Lone Wolf, supporting the Kiowa Chiefs, pulled a rifle out from under his blanket serape and pointed it at Sherman. Sherman, ready for any problem, quickly disarmed him before the trigger could be pulled. Big Tree made an attempt to escape but was quickly subdued by Carpenter's mounted troopers. Sherman decided that these men were criminals to be tried in a civil court and Carpenter was told to get it done.

Carpenter faced many problems associated with this, including the possibility of the Indians being rescued by their followers or being lynched by angry settlers, during their transport to the civilian court. During transport, Satank hid himself under his red blanket in his wagon while he gnawed the base of his thumb to the bone. This allowed him to slip the manacle from his wrist while he sang his death chant. With a small hidden knife that was not found during two separate searches, he stabbed the driver (who survived), both falling out of the wagon, grabbed a soldier's unloaded carbine and was mortally wounded in his escape attempt.

The other two Kiowa were tried, found guilty, sentenced to death, had their sentences commuted to life and then paroled within a few years. They violated parole by raiding; Satanta was sent to the Huntsville State Penitentiary in Texas where, in despair, he later killed himself. Big Tree, who presented witnesses to his non-involvement, was returned to the reservation and accepted pacification. He lived on in the sadness of a warrior in exile. He later became a Christian and eventually, a minister in the Baptist church. The same Kiowa chief who had supervised the torture and burning of captives went about converting his own people to Christ. There were days, he would proudly recount his cruel acts against the white man, although it is faithfully recorded that he always concluded those tales with the solemn note that God had forgiven him for those "hideous" acts.

==== Defense of the Wichita II ====
In August 1874, Carpenter became involved in fighting at Anadarko Reservation, Wichita, Indian Territory. This fighting is considered the first of many clashes during the Red River War (1874–75). Carpenter, with Troops H & I was sent to support Fort Sill and by using aggressive patrols engaged several Kiowa and Comanche raiding parties. The relatively peaceful Wichita Indians on the reservation were targets of the hostile Indians because of their increasing positive status under pacification. The 10th were sent to Fort Concho in Texas where they were established on April 17, 1875. The exception was Carpenter's troop stationed at Fort Davis as of May 1, 1875.

==== Victorio Campaign and map making ====
Fort Davis Campaign Map A hand drawn military map from the 1880 campaign against Victorio and his Chiricahua Apaches.

Carpenter became heavily involved in the Victorio Campaign of 1879–80. Victorio was a warrior and chief of the Chihenne band of the Chiricahua Apaches. From January 12, 1880, to May 12, 1880, Carpenter directed scouting missions into the isolated Chinati Mountains bordering the United States with Mexico. The surrounding area on the American side was the high desert of far West Texas. This is where Victorio and other Apaches had been making raids. These scouts helped provide the first reliable maps drawn in the areas of operation. (Note: Goodwin, Katherine R. (Fall 2004). "Fort Davis Campaign Map Returns to Texas". The Compass Rose, Special Collections. XV III No. 2 2004. University of Texas at Arlington Library. Archived from the original on July 6, 2010. Map of scouting expeditions from camps at the Chinati Mountains: from Jan 12 to May 12, 1880 under the direction of Captains L. H. Carpenter and C. D. Viele, 10th Cavalry, "The small, 16" x 13 ¼" manuscript map acquired by Special Collections details the period when the 10th Cavalry was stationed in Texas and engaged the band of the Apache Victorio. The map was drawn in 1880 by Lieutenant William H. Beck, Grierson's aide-de-camp, and it was done under the direction of Captains Louis H. Carpenter and Charles Viele, officers of the 10th U.S. Cavalry. The purpose of the scouting expeditions during the period of January to May 1880, (as depicted) on the map, was to locate the waterholes and crossings along the Rio Grande used by Victorio and his men and find a way to prevent the Apaches from exploiting these resources." Retrieved on July 14, 2009.) Finding waterholes and mapping the area was a critical step in Victorio campaign. On May 12, 1880, when eight Apaches attacked a nearby wagon train. Captain Carpenter and H Company pursued the Apaches to the Rio Grande. There, under orders, Carpenter had to stop at the international border with Mexico.

==== Rattlesnake Springs ====
Colonel Grierson, commander of the 10th Cavalry, traversed the hot Chihuahuan Desert and then the narrow valleys of the Chinati Mountains, reaching Rattlesnake Springs on the morning of August 6, 1880. His cavalrymen and their mounts were worn down from the forced march of over 65 miles in 21 hours. After resting and getting water, Grierson carefully placed his men in ambush positions. Carpenter, with his two cavalry troops, arrived as reinforcements and were posted in reserve a short distance south of the spring. The cavalrymen settled down to wait as Indian scouts brushed away any sign of their presence.

A little after two o'clock in the afternoon, Victorio and his Apaches slowly approached the springs. Victorio somehow sensed danger and halted his men. With the hostile Apaches in their sights appearing ready to bolt, the soldiers did not wait and opened fire on their own initiative; Victorio's men scattered and withdrew out of carbine range. Victorio's people needed water and believing that there were only a few soldiers present, regrouped and attacked immediately. As the battle progressed, Victorio sent his warriors to flank the soldiers. Carpenter charged forward with Companies B and H and a few massed volleys from their carbines sent the hostiles scattering back up the canyon. Stunned by the presence of such a strong force but in desperate need of water, Victorio repeatedly charged the cavalrymen in attempts to reach the spring. Grierson's cavalry defenders, now bolstered by Carpenter's two companies, stood firm. The last such attempt to break the soldiers was conducted near nightfall and when it failed, Victorio and his followers withdrew into the westward into the mountains. Carpenter with his two companies remounted in pursuit until darkness halted the effort.

On August 7, Carpenter, with Captain Nolan as second in command, and three companies of troopers headed out to Sulfur Springs to deny that source of water to the Apaches. In the early light of day, Victorio saw a string of wagons rounding a mountain spur to the southeast and about eight miles distant, crawling onto the plain. Victorio sent a band of warriors riding out of the mountains and attacked savagely. The wagons held a load of provisions for Fort Davis with a company of infantry riding in some of the wagons. The warriors were met with rifle fire, as the teamsters circled the wagons in defensive positions. Alerted by his Indian scouts, Carpenter and two companies charged to the rescue. The Apache attack disintegrated as the warriors fled in confusion to the southwest to rejoin Victorio's main force as it moved deeper into the Carrizo Mountains. Nolan's ambush was not ready and the scattered warriors were able to avoid them.

==== Pursuit of Victorio ====
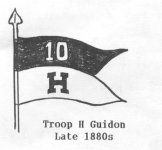
H Troop, 10th U.S. Cavalry Guidon

On August 9, fifteen Texas Rangers with their Indian scouts, located Victorio's main supply camp on Sierra Diablo. The Rangers joined Carpenter in the attack while Nolan guarded Sulfur Springs. Carpenter's attack scattered the Indian guards while the troopers secured 25 head of cattle, provisions and several pack animals. Victorio under increasing pressure, short of food and more importantly water, began to head south in two main groups. By August 11, Carpenter was on the trail in pursuit but, with horses tired and thirsty from the campaign, the chase was slow. Carpenter divided his command, with Nolan with his company and Texas Rangers on one route, while he took the rest of the command on another route. On August 13, Nolan reached the Rio Grande where Indian scouts reported that Victorio had crossed the border into Mexico the evening before. Carpenter arrived later and ordered the cavalrymen to rest near the river.

On October 14, 1880, a sharpshooter of the Mexican Army ended Victorio's life at Cerro Tres Castillos, in the state of Chihuahua, Mexico. He was survived by his warrior sister Lozen who continued fighting. She was captured in 1886 by Buffalo Soldiers of the 9th Cavalry.

Over 34,420 miles of uncharted terrain were charted from 1875 to 1885 by Carpenter and other officers of the 10th Cavalry in West Texas. They added 300 plus miles of new roads with over 200 miles of telegraph lines. The scouting expeditions took the Buffalo soldiers through some of the harshest and desolate terrain ever documented in the American west. Excellent maps were provided by Carpenter and other officers showing the scarce water holes, mountain passes and grazing areas. These efforts by Carpenter and others of the 10th Cavalry were completed under adverse weather, limited supplies and the primitive equipment of the day. They had to be on the alert for the unexpected hit and run raids from Apaches and other Native American hostiles and bandits of all types."

The book Frontier Cavalryman provides the following quote on Carpenter:

—

He is considered the best company commander in the regiment and one of the best in the service. He is a gentleman by birth and training. He is not a narrow minded 'rountiner' but a broad minded student of his profession. Many officers appear to advantage in the lower ranks of the army (but) who are incapable of rising and maintaining their reputation.

...But Capt. Carpenter is not (one of them).
—

Lt. John Bigelow Jr., 9th U.S. Cavalry, United States Military Academy Class of 1877, in a letter home.

==== First Fort commands ====
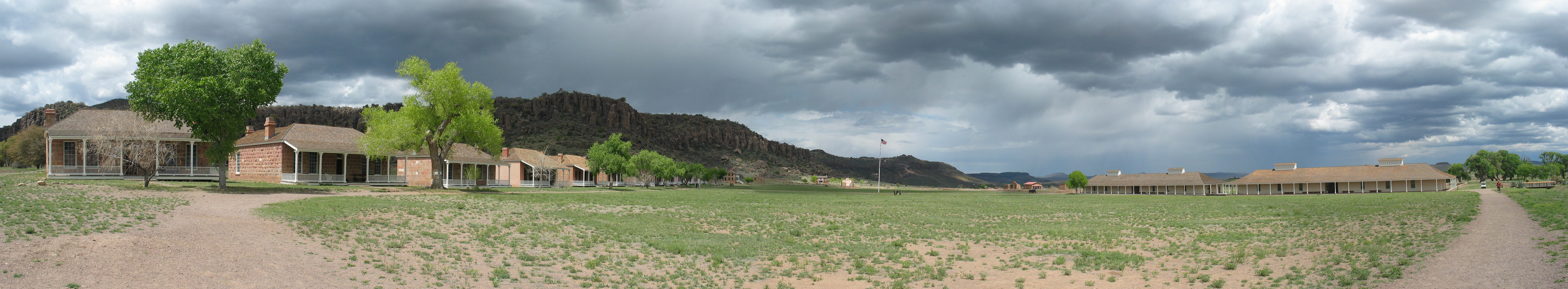
Fort Davis drill ground in West Texas.

From August 30, 1878, to May 29, 1879, Carpenter, while holding the rank of captain in the Regular Army, but brevetted as a colonel in the 10th Cavalry, served as Commanding Officer of Fort Davis. Later, he served another period of command at the fort, between June 13 to July 27, 1879. Carpenter was then transferred to the 5th Cavalry with promotion to major, Regular Army, on February 17, 1883.

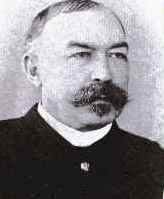
L. Henry Carpenter circa 1882.

On July 4, 1888, on the battlefield of Gettysburg, Carpenter was "court-martialed" for being absent without leave the previous day. He proved that his absence was due to the Secretary of War who, unmindful of Carpenter's duties as a former member of the Sixth U.S. Cavalry in the Civil War, had neglected to issue orders to Carpenter in time to allow him to reach Fairfield for their 5th annual veteran's reunion. (Note: Mueller, Heinrich G. Proceedings of the Fifth Annual Reunion of the Survivors of the Sixth U.S. Cavalry – Tuesday, July 3, 1888, Fraternally submitted, by Heinrich G. Mueller, Secretary. No. 95 Pasture Street, Allegheny, Pa., July 6, 1888. "We charged on Major Louis Carpenter's (formerly of our regiment) command, and for the first time, an old officer of the gallant old Sixth was completely surprised, his command demoralized and routed, and the gallant old Major left on the field, a prisoner of war." Then, "He was promptly court-martialed for being absent without leave (on) July 3(rd) and I do not know what the sentence would have been, had he not clearly proven that his absence was due to the Secretary of War, who unmindful of his duty to an old soldier, had neglected to issue the proper order in time for the Major to reach Fairfield in time for the (5th annual) reunion." Retrieved on July 14, 2009.) Major Carpenter, then commanding officer of Fort Myer, was on duty with a contingent of soldiers at the bequest of William Crowninshield Endicott, the Secretary of War, for the 25th anniversary of the Battle of Gettysburg and its Blue & Gray reunions.

=== Late career and Spanish–American War ===
Carpenter served as the first Director of the "Cavalry and Light Artillery School" at Fort Riley, Kansas as a lieutenant colonel, Regular Army, 7th Cavalry (1892–1897). This school "formed the basis for practical instruction that enabled the officers and men who participated to study the duties of the soldier in garrison, in camp, and on the march." (Note: Stubbs, Mary Lee. Page 20. "In 1887 Congress appropriated $200,000 for a school at Fort Riley, Kansas, to instruct enlisted men of cavalry and light artillery, but five years went by (1892) before the Cavalry and Light Artillery School was formally established. Once it opened its doors, however, complete regimental troops and batteries trained there, as did recruits before they joined a regiment. In the years that followed, the school changed names several times, in 1907, becoming the Mounted Service School; in 1919, the Cavalry School; on 1 November 1946, the Ground General School; and in 1950, the Army General School. The school was discontinued in May 1955.") He also served as President of the Board to Revise Cavalry Tactics for the United States Army.

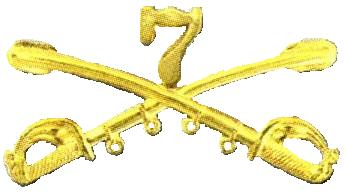
7th Regiment United States Cavalry insignia

In 1891, the United States Army conducted an experiment to integrate Indian soldiers into Regular Army units. While the primary object was to give employment, another was to utilize the talents of warriors from the most dangerous tribes. A significant number were sent to the "Cavalry School" at Fort Riley starting in late 1892. They received training not only in cavalry tactics, but in hygiene and classes in English. Unfortunately, probably by the lack of patience on part of the United States Army, and partly because of language difficulties and racial discrimination, the experiment failed and was discontinued in 1897. Carpenter had handpicked Lieutenant Hugh L. Scott to organize and command Troop L (composed of Kiowa, Comanche, and Apache Indians) for the 7th Cavalry. Scott commanded Troop L from inception to release of duty. Troop L, noted for their "deportment and discipline", was the last of these Native-American Troops to be disbanded soon after the "final review" of the Cavalry School's Director. (Note: Stubbs, Mary Lee. Page 23. "By 1890 the abatement of the Indian threat brought about the first reduction in cavalry since the Civil War. Troops L and M of all regiments were disbanded and the number of privates in each of the other companies was reduced to 44 (from a maximum of 100), in effect a reduction of about 50%." Page 24 - "The next year part of the cut was restored in an experiment that attempted to integrate Indian soldiers into Regular Army units. The primary object was to give employment to a considerable number of warriors from the most dangerous tribes. Troops L of the 1st through the 8th Cavalry were reactivated with Indian enlisted personnel drawn, as nearly as possible, from the area in which each regiment was serving. For example, Troop L, 1st Cavalry, in Montana was filled in a very short time by members of the Crow tribe. That fall (1891), the regimental commander (1st Cavalry) reported that the new troopers possessed all the characteristics and traits essential to good light cavalry. Nevertheless, due partly to the language barrier and partly to the general attitude that existed between the two races, the experiment failed and the last unit of this type, Troop L, 7th Cavalry, was disbanded in 1897.") Carpenter was promoted to lieutenant colonel, Regular Army, 2nd Cavalry on July 28, 1892, and transferred to the 5th Cavalry on August 28, 1892, serving at Fort Riley, Kansas. He was transferred to the 7th Cavalry on September 22, 1894. He was promoted to colonel, Regular Army, while stationed with the 7th Cavalry on June 2, 1897, and on May 4, 1898, he was commissioned a brigadier general of volunteers for the duration of the Spanish–American War.

General Carpenter commanded the 1st Division, 3rd Corps at Chickamauga and afterwards commanded the 3rd Division, 4th Corps at Tampa, Florida. Later, he was ordered to Cuba to occupy the Providence of Puerto Principe with a force consisting of the 8th Cavalry, 15th Infantry and the 3rd Georgia Volunteers. His were the first troops to take station in Cuba after the Battle of Santiago de Cuba. Carpenter was appointed Military Governor of the province and remained in that capacity until June 12, 1899, when he was honorably discharged and reverted to his regular army rank of colonel. Colonel Carpenter was promoted on October 18, 1899, to brigadier general, Regular Army; he then retired the next day, at his own request, having served honorably for 38 years.

== Retirement ==
1912 signature of Gen. Louis H. Carpenter

After retiring from the Army Carpenter went home to Philadelphia but never married or had any children. He updated and completed the book his father Edward Carpenter started on his family's genealogical research, publishing it in 1912, regarding his immigrant ancestor Samuel Carpenter.

He spent time writing about his Civil War service and his time on the Western Frontier. His work on the May 1864 Richmond Raid, also known as Sheridan's raid, with the resulting Battle of Yellow Tavern where Confederate Army Major General J.E.B. Stuart was mortally wounded is still used as a basic reference. He gave many talks and wrote articles for the G.A.R. The Grand Army of the Republic was a fraternal organization composed of veterans of the Union Army who had served in the American Civil War.

Brigadier General Carpenter died on January 21, 1916, at his home on 2318 De Lancey Place in Philadelphia and was buried in the family plot at Trinity Episcopal Church New Cemetery, Swedesboro, New Jersey.

== Honors and awards ==
During his military career, Carpenter earned the Medal of Honor during the Indian campaigns. He received a brevet promotion for bravery and was mentioned in dispatches during the Civil War. He received another brevet promotion and mention in military dispatches during the Indian campaigns.

=== Medal of Honor citation ===
Rank and organization: Captain, Company H, 10th U.S. Cavalry. Place and date: At Indian campaigns, Kansas and Colorado, September–October 1868. Entered service at: Philadelphia, Pa. Birth: Glassboro, N.J. Date of issue April 8, 1898.

Citation:

Was gallant and meritorious throughout the campaigns, especially in the combat of October 15 and in the forced March on September 23, 24 and 25 to the relief of Forsyth's Scouts, who were known to be in danger of annihilation by largely superior forces of Indians.

=== Military promotions ===
==== Regular Army ====
- Private: July 1861, Company C, 6th US Cavalry
- Corporal: November 1, 1861, Company C, 6th US Cavalry
- Sergeant: February 1862, Company L, 6th US Cavalry

Brigadier general
O-7

October 19, 1899, HQ, Washington, D.C. (Note: General Carpenter held several ranks due to brevet or temporary promotions. The dates given here reflect the permanent Regular Army rank when awarded.)

Colonel	Lieutenant colonel	Major	Captain	First Lieutenant	2nd lieutenant (Note: Until December 1917, a U.S. Army 2nd lieutenant did not wear an insignia of rank. Ranks shown are modern representatives of U.S. Army officer ranks.)
O-6	O-5	O-4	O-3	O-2	O-1
June 2, 1897, F&S, 5th US Cavalry	July 28, 1892, F&S, 2nd US Cavalry	February 17, 1883, F&S, 5th US Cavalry	July 28, 1866, Company H, 10th US Cavalry	September 28, 1864, F&S Cavalry Corps	July 17, 1862, Company L, 6th US Cavalry

==== Brevet promotions ====
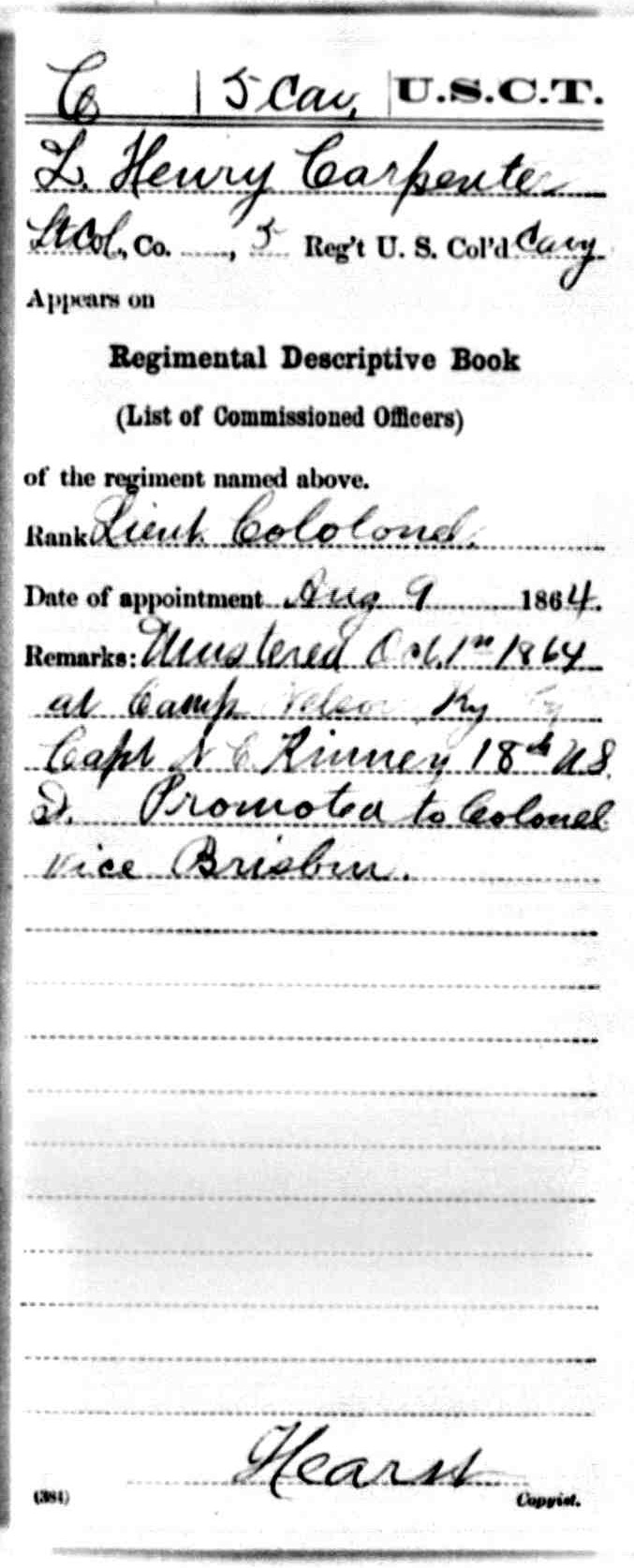
United States Colored Troops Enlistment card of L. Henry Carpenter, Lt. Col. of Volunteers, mustered October 1, 1864, assigned to the 5th US Colored Cavalry

Carpenter received a series of brevet promotions for gallantry and or meritorious service to the ranks of:

- First lieutenant on July 3, 1863, for Gettysburg.
- Captain (United States) on September 19, 1864, for Winchester, Virginia.
- Major (United States) on March 13, 1865, for gallantry.
- Lieutenant colonel (United States) on March 13, 1865, for meritorious service during the Civil War.
- Colonel (United States) on October 18, 1868, for Beaver Creek, Kansas during the Indian Wars. (Note: During the American Civil War, the Union Army used brevet promotions. Soldiers and officers could be brevetted to fill officer positions as a reward for gallantry or meritorious service. Typically, the brevetted officer would be given the insignia of the brevetted rank, but not the pay or formal authority. It was not unheard of for an officer to have several different ranks simultaneously, such as being a brevet major general of volunteers, an actual brigadier general of volunteers, a brevet lieutenant colonel in the Regular Army, and an actual Regular Army rank of captain (e.g. Ranald S. Mackenzie). The practice of brevetting disappeared from the (regular) U.S. military at the end of the 19th century; instead, honors were bestowed with a series of medals. However, a similar practice of frocking continues in all five branches of the U.S. armed forces.)

==== U.S. Volunteers ====
- Lieutenant colonel on October 1, 1864, 5th US Colored Cavalry (USCC)
- Colonel on November 2, 1865, 5th USCC
- Brigadier general on May 4, 1898, 1st Corps, 3rd Division

=== Known commands ===
- Commanded the 5th US Colored Cavalry Regiment 1865–1866
- Commanded Fort Davis in West Texas 1878–1879.
- Fort Robinson, Nebraska 1887
- Fort Myer, Virginia 1887–1891
- Director of Cavalry School Application, Fort Riley, Kansas 1892
- Appointed to revise cavalry tactics 1896
- Commanded Fort Sam Houston, Texas 1897–1898
- Command of 1st Corps and 3rd Division, then 4th Corps in the Spanish–American War 1898
- Military Governor of the Province of Puerto Principe, now Camagüey Province, Cuba 1898–1899.

=== Memberships and clubs ===
- Member of the Loyal Legion
- Veteran of Foreign Wars
- Society, American Numismatic (1897). The Society of the Army of the Potomac.
- Society, American Numismatic (1897). The Cavalry Society of the Armies of the United States.
- Historical Society of Pennsylvania
- Academy of Natural Sciences
- "Army and Navy Club (Washington D.C.)".
- "Rittenhouse Club (Philadelphia, Pennsylvania)".
- Union League of Philadelphia

== See also ==
- List of Medal of Honor recipients for the Indian Wars
- List of people from Colorado
- List of people with surname Carpenter
