= Robert Johnson Henderson =

Confederate States Army Colonel

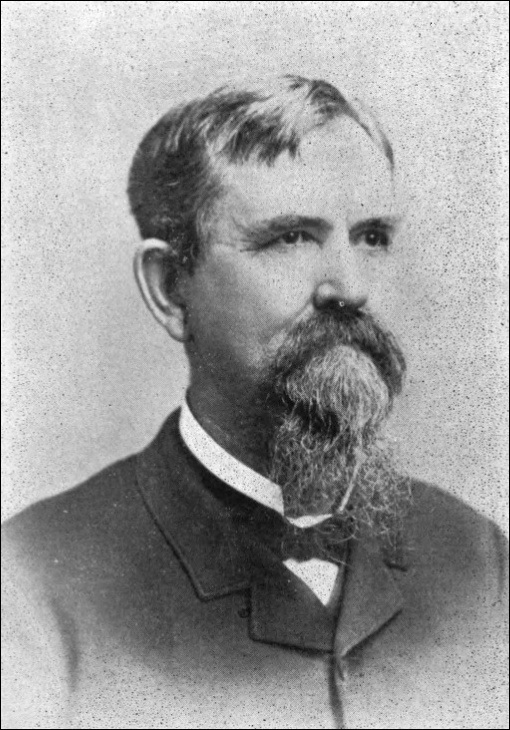
- Born: November 12, 1822; Newton County, Georgia, US
- Died: February 3, 1891 (aged 68); Atlanta, Georgia, US
- Burial place: Henderson (Southview) Cemetery, Covington, Georgia
- Military career
- Allegiance: Confederate States of America
- Branch: Confederate States Army
- Service years: 1862–1865
- Rank: Colonel; Appointed to duty as: Brigadier General
- Commands: 42nd Georgia Infantry; Cumming's Brigade (acting)
- Conflicts: American Civil War
- Other work: planter

Robert Johnson Henderson (November 12, 1822 – February 3, 1891) was a Confederate States Army colonel during the American Civil War (Civil War). His obituary stated that he was made a brigadier general by General Joseph E. Johnston, after Johnston witnessed Henderson making a desperate charge at the Battle of Bentonville, North Carolina, on March 10, 1865. At the suggestion of his divisional commanders, Henderson signed his parole as a brigadier general. Later, Henderson stated in his pardon application that he had been recommended for promotion to brigadier general but had never received a commission. Henderson commanded a brigade for several weeks at the end of the war but never was officially appointed by Confederate President Jefferson Davis and confirmed by the Confederate States Senate to brigadier general rank.

== Early life ==
Robert Johnson Henderson was born in Newton County, Georgia on November 12, 1822. His parents were Isaac and Ruth Shepherd (Johnson) Henderson. Isaac Henderson, who was born in Maryland, was a wealthy planter and a representative in the state legislature.

Henderson graduated from Franklin College, now the University of Georgia, in 1843. After graduation, he became a lawyer, judge, mill owner, planter, a major in the Georgia militia and, in 1859 and 1860, a Georgia state legislator. He was a wealthy planter and slave owner in Covington in Newton County at the beginning of the Civil War.

Robert J. Henderson's wife was Laura (Wood) Henderson. The Hendersons had three sons: John F. Henderson, Charles Z. Henderson and William H. Henderson, and two daughters, Mary Ruth Hill and Claudia L. Hill.

== American Civil War service ==
Robert Johnson Henderson did not join the Confederate States Army at the outset of the Civil War. In early 1862, he helped raise the 42nd Georgia Infantry Regiment and was elected colonel on March 20, 1862. The regiment soon saw service at the Battle of the Cumberland Gap (June 1862) where Union forces under Brigadier General George W. Morgan secured temporary control of the gap.

Henderson commanded his regiment at the Battle of Champion's Hill and the Siege of Vicksburg. He was captured at the surrender of Vicksburg on July 4, 1863, paroled and exchanged.

Henderson was wounded at the Battle of Resaca during the Atlanta campaign. He returned to lead his regiment during the Carolinas campaign. General Joseph E. Johnston witnessed Henderson leading a desperate charge at the Battle of Bentonville, North Carolina, March 19–21, 1865. His brigade's charge helped restore a crumbling Confederate flank. Johnston proceeded to promote Henderson to brigadier general, or more likely to acting brigadier general, because Johnston had no authority to promote officers to general officer rank. On the other hand, the Confederate civilian authorities were in disarray and the Confederate Senate had already met for the last time so Henderson was unlikely to receive an official appointment, confirmation and commission and he was never legally commissioned. Henderson led the brigade as part of Carter L. Stevenson's Division of the II Corps of the Army of Tennessee until the surrender of Johnston's army at Bennett Place near Durham, North Carolina on April 26, 1865.

Henderson was remembered for his bravery, strict discipline and expert management of men in battle. At the suggestion of his division commander, when Henderson signed his 1865 parole he listed his rank as brigadier general. Later, Henderson stated in his pardon application that he had been recommended for promotion to brigadier general but had never received a commission.

== Aftermath ==
After the war, Henderson found his property in ruins but was able to rebuild his mill and his business as a planter.

Robert Johnson Henderson died on February 3, 1891, at his daughter's (Mrs. L. J. (Mary Ruth) Hill) home in Atlanta, Georgia. He is buried in a family cemetery, identified as Henderson (Southview) Cemetery, in Covington, Georgia.

== See also ==
- List of American Civil War generals (Acting Confederate)
