= Battle of the Cumberland Gap (1862) =

Battle of the American Civil War

Coordinates: 36°36′14″N 83°40′23″W

- Part of the American Civil War
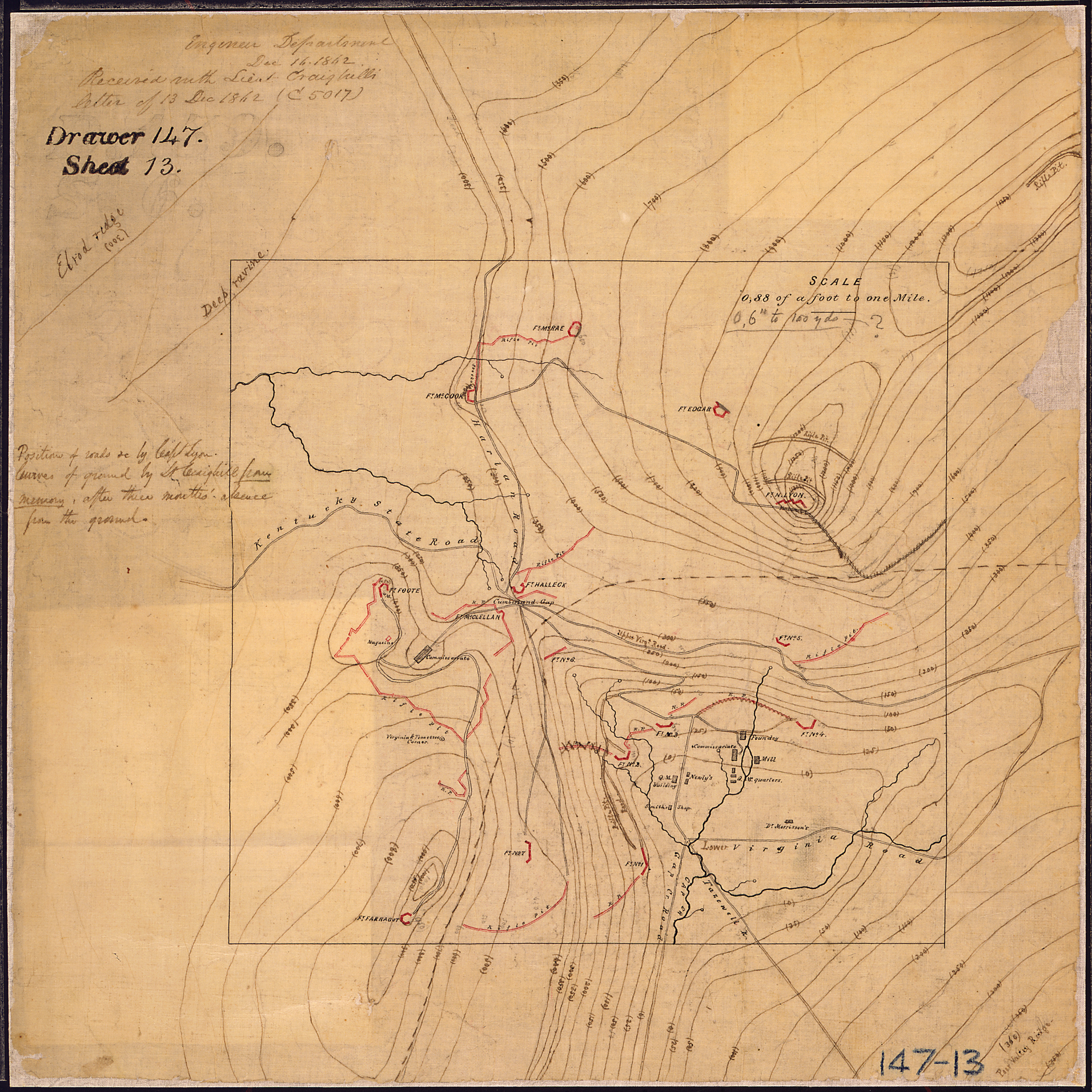
- Cumberland Gap Defenses
Date	June 18, 1862
Location	Cumberland Gap, TN, KY and VA
Result	Union victory

Belligerents
United States (Union)	(Confederate States of America) CSA (Confederacy)

Commanders and leaders
George W. Morgan	Carter L. Stevenson

Strength
4 brigades	3 brigades

Casualties and losses
0	Unknown

The June 1862 capture of the Cumberland Gap was a Union victory during the American Civil War leading to Union occupation of the Cumberland Gap for three months.

== Background ==
The Confederates held a long line of fortifications across Kentucky, Tennessee and into Missouri under Albert Sidney Johnston. The center of Johnston's defenses was Bowling Green, KY with the left flank anchored at Island No. 10 on the Mississippi River and the right held by Brig. Gen. Felix Zollicoffer at the Cumberland Gap.

In early 1862 the Union Army had met with great success in the Western Theater. A string of victories at Mill Springs, Fort Henry, Fort Donelson, Island No. 10, and Shiloh had broken the Confederate defenses at several key points, and both Zollicoffer and Johnston had died in action (at Mill Springs and Shiloh respectively).

== Opposing Forces ==
=== Union ===
- 7th Division, Army of the Ohio - Brig. Gen. George W. Morgan
  - 24th Brigade - Brig. Gen. Samuel P. Carter
    - 49th Indiana - Lt. Col. James Keigwin
    - 7th Kentucky - Col. Theophilus T. Garrard
    - 1st Tennessee - Col. Robert K. Byrd
    - 2nd Tennessee - Col. James P. T. Carter
  - 25th Brigade - Brig. Gen. James G. Spears
    - 3rd Tennessee - Col. Leonidas C. Houk
    - 4th Tennessee - Col. Robert Johnson
    - 5th Tennessee - Col. James T. Shelly
    - 6th Tennessee - Col. Joseph A. Cooper
  - 26th Brigade - Col. John F. DeCourcy
    - 22nd Kentucky - Col. Daniel W. Lindsey
    - 16th Ohio - Lt. Col. George W. Bailey
    - 42nd Ohio - Col. Lionel A. Sheldon
  - 27th Brigade - Brig. Gen. Absalom Baird
    - 33rd Indiana - Col. John Coburn
    - 14th Kentucky - Col. John Cochran
    - 19th Kentucky - Col. William J. Landram
  - Artillery - Cpt. Jacob T. Foster
    - 7th Michigan Battery - Capt. Charles H. Lamphere
    - 9th Ohio Battery - Lt. Leonard P. Barrows
    - 1st Wisconsin Battery - Lt. John D. Anderson
    - Siege Battery - Lt. Daniel Webster
  - Cavalry
    - 1st Battalion, Kentucky Cavalry - Lt. Col. Reuben J. Munday
  - Engineers
    - Independent Company, Kentucky Engineers - Capt. William F. Patterson

=== Confederate ===
- Stevenson's Division - Brig. Gen. Carter L. Stevenson
  - 2nd Brigade - Col James E. Rains
    - 4th Tennessee - Col. James A. McMurry
    - 11th Tennessee - Col. James E. Rains
    - 42nd Georgia - Col. Robert J. Henderson
    - 3rd Georgia Battalion - Lt. Col. Marcellus A. Stovall
    - 29th North Carolina - Col. Robert B. Vance
    - Georgia Battery - Capt. James G. Yeiser
  - 3rd Brigade - Brig. Gen. Seth M. Barton
    - 30th Alabama - Col. Charles M. Shelley
    - 31st Alabama - Col. Daniel R. Hundley
    - 40th Georgia - Col. Abda Johnson
    - 52nd Georgia - Col. Wier G. Boyd
    - 9th Georgia Battalion - Maj. Joseph T. Smith
    - Virginia Battery - Capt. Joseph W. Anderson
  - 5th Brigade - Col. Thomas H. Taylor
    - 23rd Alabama - Col. Franklin K. Beck
    - 46th Alabama - Col. Michael L. Woods
    - 3rd Tennessee - Col. John C. Vaughn
    - 31st Tennessee - Col. William M. Bradford
    - 59th Tennessee - Col. James B. Cooke
    - Tennessee (Rhett) Battery - Capt. William H. Burroughs

== Campaign against the Cumberland Gap ==
In March 1862 Brig. Gen. George W. Morgan sent a brigade under Brig. Gen. Samuel P. Carter against the eastern end of the Confederate defenses at the Cumberland Gap. These defenses were now held by Col. James Edward Rains after Zollicoffer's defeat and death at Mill Springs. The Confederate works were considered too formidable to be taken by direct assault and Carter's force lacked sufficient artillery to match the well placed Confederate batteries.

By April, General Morgan was moving against the gap with the remaining three brigades of his division. Morgan's force now included the brigades of Carter, James G. Spears, John F. DeCourcy and Absalom Baird along with a brigade of artillery and cavalry. Meanwhile, Brig. Gen. Carter L. Stevenson brought up the remaining brigades of Seth Maxwell Barton and T.H. Taylor to Col. Rain's defense. Morgan proposed to Maj. Gen. Don Carlos Buell that Chattanooga be threatened in order to force the Confederates to pull their strength away from the Cumberland Gap. At the same time General Edmund Kirby Smith, Confederate commander in eastern Kentucky, proposed a threat against Nashville to draw Union forces away from the gap. Only Morgan got his wish. A Union division under Brig. Gen. James S. Negley attacked Chattanooga on June 7, 1862. This demonstration against Chattanooga was small but it proved the Union forces could strike where they wanted. It was enough for Kirby Smith to reconsider Stevenson's position at the Cumberland Gap.

The Union advance against the gap was made over difficult terrain, particularly in regards to the artillery brought with. Morgan was also forced to abandon his supply lines and rely solely upon foraging. Through two weeks of maneuvering through enemy territory Morgan reached the gap without losing a single man. Kirby Smith ordered Stevenson to withdraw to Chattanooga in response to Negley's attack. On June 18 Morgan reported to General Buell he had taken control of the "American Gibraltar".

== Aftermath ==
General Morgan praised his division for the efficiency of their actions in the face of logistical difficulties. Even though he held a strong defensive position, Morgan was far from any Union base with no established supply lines. His reports to Maj. Gen. Henry W. Halleck however remained full of optimism. As late as August, 1862 Morgan reported he had no intentions of evacuating the gap and "if the enemy attacks he will be crushed". Kirby Smith's attention had been devoted to securing Chattanooga. It was not until Confederates under Braxton Bragg invaded Kentucky that Morgan found himself facing a serious Confederate threat. Morgan was forced to abandon the gap in September 1862, but managed to conduct a masterful withdrawal through enemy territory. The Cumberland Gap would remain in Confederate control until Maj. Gen. Ambrose Burnside recaptured it in 1863.
