= First Battle of Chattanooga =

Battle of the American Civil War

Coordinates: 35.0651°N 85.3088°W

- Part of American Civil War
Date	June 7, 1862 – June 8, 1862
Location	Chattanooga, Tennessee
Result	Union victory

Belligerents
United States (Union)	(Confederate States of America) CSA (Confederacy)

Commanders and leaders
James S. Negley	Edmund Kirby Smith

Units involved
Negley's Division, Army of the Ohio	Army of Kentucky

Strength
1 division	

Casualties and losses
23	65

The First Battle of Chattanooga was a minor artillery battle in the American Civil War, fought on June 7–8, 1862.

== Background ==
In late spring 1862, the Confederacy split its forces in Chattanooga, Tennessee into several small commands in an attempt to complicate Federal operations. Union Maj. Gen. Ormsby M. Mitchel received orders to take his division to Huntsville, Alabama, to repair railroads in the area. Soon, he occupied more than 100 miles along the Nashville & Chattanooga and Memphis & Charleston railroads. In May, Mitchel and his men sparred with Maj. Gen. Edmund Kirby Smith's men.

== Battle ==
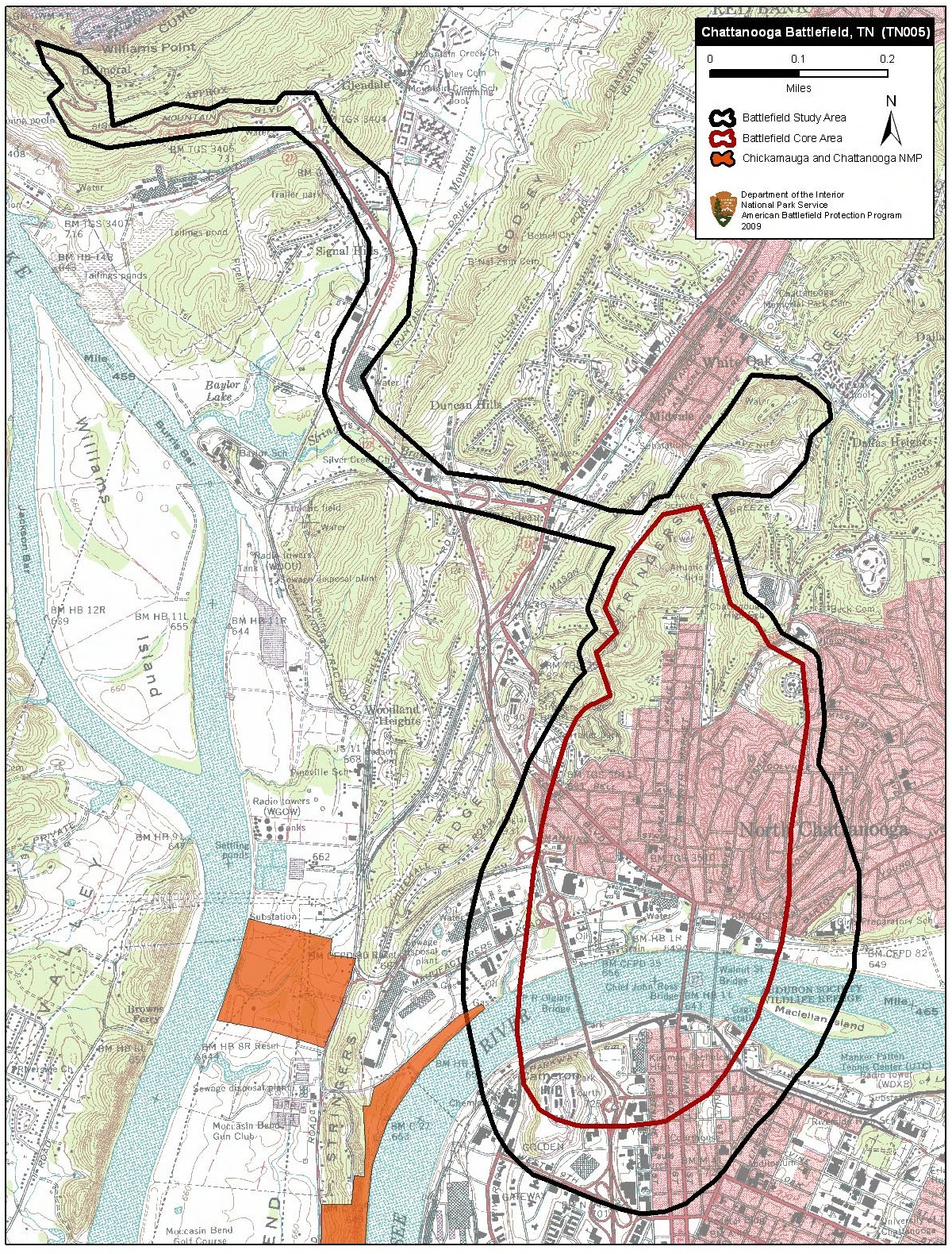
Map of Chattanooga I Battlefield core and study areas by the American Battlefield Protection Program

After Mitchel received command of all Federal troops between Nashville and Huntsville on May 29, he ordered Brig. Gen. James Negley with a small division to lead an expedition to capture Chattanooga. This force arrived before Chattanooga on June 7. Negley ordered the 79th Pennsylvania Infantry out to reconnoiter. It found the Confederates entrenched on the opposite side of the river along the banks and atop Cameron Hill. Negley brought up two artillery batteries to open fire on the Rebel troops and the town and sent infantry to the river bank to act as sharpshooters. The Union bombardment of Chattanooga continued throughout June 7 and until noon on June 8. The Confederates replied, but it was uncoordinated since the undisciplined gunners were allowed to do as they wished. On June 10, Smith, who had arrived on June 8, reported that Negley had withdrawn and the Confederate loss was minor. This attack on Chattanooga was a warning that Union troops could mount assaults when they wanted. The attack also prompted Edmund Kirby Smith to withdraw Confederate troops from other areas to defend Chattanooga. This redeployment of troops allowed George W. Morgan to capture the Cumberland Gap on June 18, 1862.

== Battlefield preservation ==
The American Battlefield Trust and its partners have acquired and preserved more than 405 acres (1.64 km^{2}) battlefield acres at Chattanooga as of mid-2023.

== See also ==
- Second Battle of Chattanooga
- Chattanooga campaign
