= Joseph Alexander Cooper =

American politician

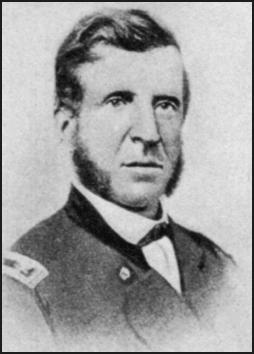
- Joseph Alexander Cooper
- Born: November 25, 1823; Whitley County, Kentucky, US
- Died: May 20, 1910 (aged 86); Stafford County, Kansas, US
- Burial place: Knoxville National Cemetery, Knoxville, Tennessee
- Military career
- Allegiance: United States; Union
- Branch: United States Army; Union Army
- Service years: 1847, 1861–66
- Rank: Brigadier General; Brevet Major General
- Units: Fourth Tennessee Volunteers; 1st Tennessee Infantry
- Commands: 6th Tennessee Infantry; 1st Bde, 2nd Div, XXIII Corps; 2nd Division, XXIII Corps
- Conflicts: Mexican–American War; American Civil War; Battle of Mill Springs; Battle of Stones River; Battle of Chickamauga; Knoxville campaign; Atlanta campaign; Battle of Resaca; Battle of Jonesborough; Battle of Nashville; Battle of Bentonville
- Other work: Tennessee State Guard commander, politician, farmer

Joseph Alexander Cooper (November 25, 1823 – May 20, 1910) was an American farmer, soldier, and civil servant. A Southern Unionist, he fought for the Union Army during the American Civil War, commanding units at Mill Springs, Stones River, Chickamauga, Franklin, Nashville, Bentonville, and in the Knoxville and Atlanta campaigns. He had achieved the rank of Brevet Major General by the time he was mustered out in early 1866.

After the war, Cooper commanded the Tennessee State Guard, a state militia organized by Governor William G. Brownlow to quell postwar violence across Tennessee. He served as an internal revenue agent during the 1870s before moving to Kansas, where he spent the final decades of his life.

== Early life ==
Cooper was born on a farm in Whitley County, Kentucky, near Cumberland Falls, on November 25, 1823. He was the son of John Cooper, a War of 1812 veteran, and Hester (Sage) Cooper. He and his parents moved to Campbell County, Tennessee, the following year, where they settled on a farm along Cove Creek, 5 miles (8.0 km) south of Jacksboro. Growing up in Campbell County, Cooper became a deacon in the Longfield Baptist Church in 1839, and married Mary J. Hutson in April 1846.

During the Mexican–American War, Cooper enlisted as a private in the 4th Tennessee Infantry in September 1847. He remained with this unit until he was mustered out in August 1848, having spent several months in Mexico City. After the war ended he returned to Campbell County, and was involved in farming. While not a major landholder, he nevertheless saw a threefold increase in his personal estate from 1850 to 1860.

Cooper became more politically active during the secession crisis that preceded the Civil War. A Whig, he supported Constitutional Union candidate John Bell in the 1860 presidential election. He attended both the Knoxville and Greeneville sessions of the East Tennessee Convention, which sought to create a new Union-aligned state in East Tennessee. He represented Campbell County on the Convention's powerful business committee at the Greeneville session. He initially supported a set of resolutions submitted by T.A.R. Nelson that called for violent measures to be taken if the Convention's demands were not met, but gradually came to favor a more moderate set of resolutions offered by Knoxville attorney Oliver Perry Temple.

== Civil War service ==
While in Greeneville, Cooper made a secret pact with several other East Tennessee Convention delegates, including Richard M. Edwards and Robert K. Byrd, to return to their respective homes and begin recruiting and drilling men to defend the region against a Confederate invasion. Returning to Campbell County, Cooper began rallying Unionists, farming by day, and recruiting at night. By August, he had recruited over 500 men. He drilled the recruits at King Field, a remote highland meadow near Jacksboro.

Upon the approach of Confederate forces, Cooper and his new unit fled to Kentucky. He was mustered in as captain of Company A of the 1st Tennessee Infantry on August 4, 1861. He took part in operations around Cumberland Gap, and was present at the Battle of Mill Springs in January 1862. In March of the same year, Cooper's company attacked and broke through Confederate defenses at Big Creek Gap, a key mountain pass in northern Campbell County. In May 1862, Cooper was promoted to colonel and placed in command of the 6th Tennessee Infantry, which he organized and recruited. In July 1862, Cooper and his regiment attacked a Confederate force at Wallace's Crossroads (near modern Andersonville, Tennessee), killing five soldiers and capturing several others.

Cooper retreated with Union forces northward to the Ohio River in late September 1862, to regroup. In December 1862, he joined Union forces in Nashville. During the Battle of Stones River in early January 1863, Cooper and the 6th accompanied a supply train from Nashville to the front lines in Murfreesboro, and repulsed an attempt by Joseph Wheeler to capture the supplies. Cooper skirmished with Confederate forces on Lookout Mountain during the latter phases of the Battle of Chickamauga in September 1863, and took part in the Knoxville Campaign in late 1863 and early 1864. In April 1864, Cooper commanded the 3rd brigade at the Battle of Resaca in Georgia, where his unit suffered a 30% casualty rate. He afterward took part in General William T. Sherman's Atlanta campaign.

Battle of Nashville

Cooper was promoted to brigadier general on July 30, 1864. He commanded a brigade of the 2nd Division of the XXIII Corps from June 4, 1864. At the Battle of Utoy Creek he led two brigades in a charge and flanking movement of Armstrongs Dismounted Cavalry Brigade of Bates Division along the Sandtown Road, on August 6, 1864. He temporarily obtained divisional command following the Battle of Jonesborough.

Cooper was again in command of his brigade, and intermittently commanded the 2nd Division during the Franklin-Nashville Campaign. Marching to relieve Nashville, which was threatened by General John B. Hood in November 1864, Cooper was forced to proceed beyond the city to Clarksville to avoid capture, and returned to the city after resting for a day, marching over 150 miles (240 km) in six days. Upon reaching the front, he helped thwart Hood's assault on the city, charging and capturing two artillery pieces and a number of Confederate soldiers.

In January 1865, Cooper led the 2nd Division to North Carolina, where he took part in the Battle of Bentonville. In March 1865, he was appointed a brevet major general in the Union Army for his service throughout the war, in particular for his actions at Nashville. He was mustered out on January 15, 1866.

== Tennessee State Guard ==
After the war, Cooper moved to Knox County and engaged in politics. When a rift developed between Governor William "Parson" Brownlow and President Andrew Johnson over how to deal with freedmen and former Confederates, Cooper supported Brownlow, who sought to extend civil rights to former slaves and disfranchise ex-Confederates. Cooper publicly denounced Johnson, and was described by one newspaper as Johnson's "most violent enemy." In August 1865, Cooper ran for the 2nd district seat in Congress. Though he placed second, ahead of fellow Union officer Robert K. Byrd and future congressman Leonidas C. Houk, he was still well behind the winner, Horace Maynard. He rejected subsequent calls to run for the state legislature.

Brownlow's hardline stance toward former Confederates created widespread unrest among Rebel vigilante groups across the state, most notably the Ku Klux Klan. Brownlow initially sought the assistance of the federal army, but its commanders were reluctant to get involved in what was deemed a civil matter. To quell the rising violence and maintain order in the August 1867 elections, Brownlow and his allies in the state legislature created a new state militia, known as the Tennessee State Guard, in January 1867. Brownlow appointed Cooper commander of the State Guard, with the rank of brigadier general, on June 7, 1867.

Cooper quickly formalized the Guard's structure, dividing its 1,900 recruits into two regiments, each containing an equal number of companies from each of the state's three grand divisions. Many of the company captains were former Union Army officers. The Guard also included a number of black soldiers. Along with formalizing the Guard's structure, Cooper also resolved various supply and logistics issues. Twenty-one companies were deployed in troubled spots across the state, mostly in Middle and West Tennessee. One week before the August 1867 elections, Cooper declared the Guard ready.

In the election, Brownlow easily defeated his Conservative opponent, Emerson Etheridge. Conservatives criticized the State Guard for using ruthless tactics to harass voters, and appealed to President Andrew Johnson for help. Conservative newspapers assailed the State Guard as tyrannical, and Guardsmen were often portrayed as overly aggressive and undisciplined. Nashville mayor William Matt Brown, who had clashed with Cooper in July 1867, was one of the Guard's most vehement critics. Brown declared that the State Guard did not have the authority to police municipal elections, and formed a special police force to oversee the city's local elections in September 1867. In response, Cooper dispatched a battalion of State Guardsmen to the city, and Brown eventually backed down. By the end of September, most Guardsmen had been mustered out, and the remaining companies consolidated into a "special command" to continue to pursue vigilantes. Cooper relinquished command on October 11, declaring the Klan threat contained.

Toward the end of his gubernatorial tenure in January 1869, Brownlow, citing another rise in Klan violence, reactivated the State Guard, and reappointed Cooper its commander. Using powers granted him earlier that year by the state legislature, Brownlow declared martial law in nine Tennessee counties, and ordered the Guard deployed to these counties. Cooper declared that any Klansmen captured would be hanged, and warned local authorities in non-affected counties that martial law would be imposed on them, as well, if they did not aid in the fight against the Klan. In late February 1869, however, Brownlow's successor, Dewitt Clinton Senter, softened the martial law decree, and afterward began demobilizing the Guard. Cooper relinquished command for the second time on May 22, 1869.

Historians in the late 19th century were often critical of the State Guard, describing it as an instrument of oppression, and going so far as to compare it to Oliver Cromwell's New Model Army of 17th-century England. However, historian Ben H. Severance argues the State Guard was actually a "responsible defender of both the Reconstruction process and the civil rights of the freedmen." He suggests that in spite of sporadic reports of drunkenness and violence, the Guard was unusually well-behaved, and cites Cooper's leadership and emphasis on discipline as the reason for this.

== Later life ==
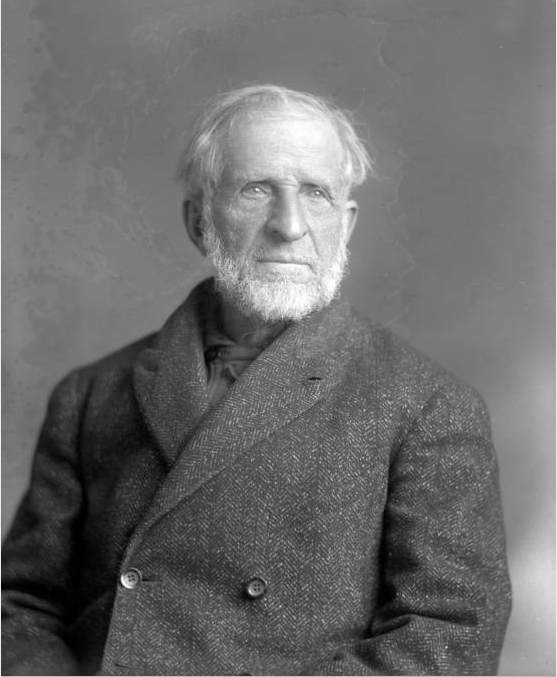
Cooper, photographed in 1906

In October 1867, Cooper was among the candidates considered for the soon-to-be-vacant U.S. Senate seat of David T. Patterson, but the legislature elected Brownlow. In May 1869, Cooper attended the contentious state Republican Party convention, which was wrought with consistent infighting between supporters of Senter and supporters of William B. Stokes. When Alfred Cate, Roderick R. Butler, and Thomas H. Pearne scuffled over the chairman's gavel, a frustrated Cooper restored control and convinced the delegates to adjourn for the day in order to cool off. He told the delegates, "Go, and drink less bad whiskey and you will be more capable of doing business." Later that year, President Ulysses S. Grant appointed Cooper internal revenue collector for the Knoxville District. He held this position until 1879, when he was removed following an intraparty power struggle.

In 1880, Cooper moved to Stafford County, Kansas, where he became involved in farming, and supported local Republican Party candidates. Shortly after his arrival in Stafford County, he was appointed moderator of the South Central Baptist Association of Kansas, a position he held until 1909. On April 3, 1891, he was injured in the city of Larned in Pawnee County when he was struck by a railroad car, though he recovered. He died at his home near St. John on May 20, 1910. His body was returned to Knoxville, Tennessee, where he was interred in the Knoxville National Cemetery.

== See also ==
- Samuel P. Carter
- James G. Spears
- List of American Civil War generals (Union)
