= Robert K. Byrd =

American soldier and politician

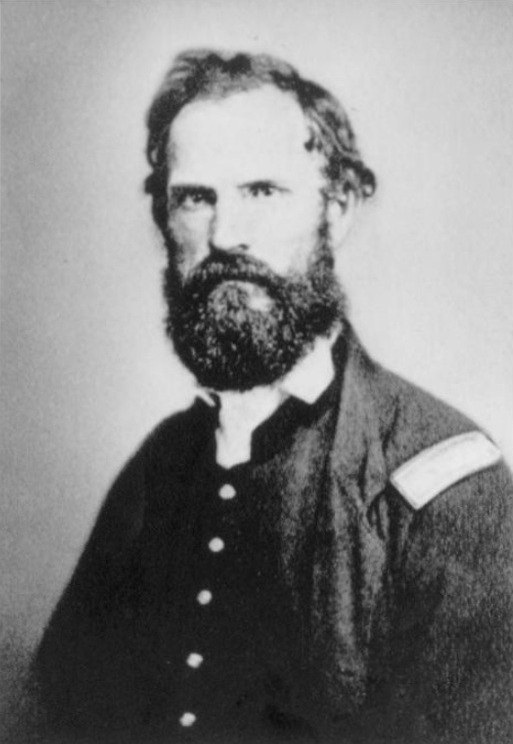

Member of the Tennessee Senate from the Fifth District
- In office January 6, 1879 – January 2, 1881
- Preceded by: L.M. Wester
- Succeeded by: L.T. Smith

Personal details
- Born: November 4, 1823 Roane County, Tennessee, U.S.
- Died: May 2, 1885 (aged 61) Roane County, Tennessee, U.S.
- Resting place: Bethel Cemetery; Kingston, Tennessee
- Party: Democratic
- Spouse: Mary Lea
- Profession: Planter

Military service
- Allegiance: United States of America
- Branch/service: United States Army
- Years of service: September 1, 1861 – September 17, 1864
- Rank: Colonel
- Commands: 1st Tennessee Volunteer Infantry
- Battles/wars: Mexican-American War; American Civil War • Mill Springs (1862) • Stones River (1862–3) • Knoxville Campaign (1863) • Atlanta campaign (1864)

Robert King Byrd (November 4, 1823 – May 2, 1885) was an American soldier and politician. A Southern Unionist, he commanded the Union Army's First Tennessee Infantry during the Civil War, and saw action at Cumberland Gap, Stones River, and in the Knoxville and Atlanta campaigns. He represented his native Roane County at the pro-Union East Tennessee Convention on the eve of the war in 1861, and at the Nashville convention that reorganized the Tennessee state government toward the end of the war in January 1865.

Byrd served one term (1879–1881) in the Tennessee Senate, and unsuccessfully sought the Democratic Party's nomination for governor in 1880. He was a persistent advocate for railroad construction and navigational improvements to the Tennessee River during the two decades following the war.

== Early life and career ==
Byrd was born in Roane County, the son of Joseph and Ann (Pride) Byrd. The Byrds were one of the more prominent families in the county. Jesse Byrd, Robert's grandfather, established a ferry at Kingston in the 1790s, when Fort Southwest Point was still in operation. Joseph Byrd was a major landowner and county sheriff.

Robert K. Byrd fought in the Mexican–American War as a First Lieutenant in Company C of the 4th Tennessee Infantry. During the 1850s, he engaged in farming, and promoted railroad construction. In 1853, he was appointed to a seven-man commission tasked with fundraising and surveying a route for the proposed South Carolina, Tennessee and Kentucky Railroad. He was an active member of the Roane County Agricultural Society in the mid-1850s, and was listed on the state militia register in 1855.

== Civil War ==
Although a slaveholder, Byrd, like many East Tennesseans, remained loyal to the Union during the Civil War. He was a member of the Roane County delegation at both the Knoxville and Greeneville sessions of the East Tennessee Convention in mid-1861. At the latter session, he also served as a proxy delegate for Cumberland County, and represented that county on the convention's powerful business committee. While in Greeneville, Byrd made a secret pact with several other convention delegates, including Joseph A. Cooper and Richard M. Edwards, to return to their respective homes and begin raising and drilling military units to provide for the region's defense. In August 1861, Byrd's father-in-law, James Lea, became one of several Unionists elected to the Tennessee House of Representatives.

Byrd fled to Kentucky in August 1861, and was mustered into the Union Army as a colonel on September 1 of that year, in command of the First Tennessee Volunteer Infantry. This unit was the first Union regiment of the war composed primarily of refugees from East Tennessee. During the first half of 1862, the First Tennessee was involved in numerous skirmishes in the Cumberland Gap area, and was present at the Battle of Mill Springs. In February 1862, Byrd suffered a wound that left him incapacitated for a month. After withdrawing northward with Union forces to the Ohio River in September 1862, the First Tennessee was reassigned to the Army of the Cumberland.

Byrd's unit was in Nashville by the time the Battle of Stones River began on December 31, 1862, and helped escort supplies from Nashville to the Union front in Murfreesboro. Toward the end of the battle, Byrd led an attack that drove a force of Confederate soldiers out of a patch of woods near the front lines, and was singled out for distinction by the brigade commander, General James G. Spears. During operations in the aftermath of the battle on January 5, 1863, Byrd led a "fearless charge" that drove three Confederate regiments from their position along a road outside of Murfreesboro.

In May 1863, the First Tennessee was mounted and redesignated the "First Tennessee Mounted Infantry," commonly called "Byrd's mounted men." In June of that year, the unit joined a raid led by Colonel William P. Sanders that destroyed railroad lines and bridges in the areas around Knoxville. Sanders credited Byrd's knowledge of the area with the raid's success. During the Knoxville Campaign in late 1863, Byrd and his unit were posted in his home town of Kingston. They took part in several skirmishes during the campaign, including one at Mossy Creek in Jefferson County in December 1863.

In May 1864, the First Tennessee was dismounted and ordered to the front lines in Georgia. The unit engaged in action near Lost Mountain in June 1864, and along the Chattahoochee River in July of the same year. In August, the unit's three-year period of service ended, and it was ordered to Knoxville to be mustered out. General John Schofield praised the First Tennessee as the "first among the patriotic men from East Tennessee to take up arms in defense of the Union," and tendered a "soldier's appreciation and regard for soldierly fidelity and gallantry" to Byrd and his officers. Byrd and his men fought one final skirmish in Athens, Tennessee, en route to Knoxville, on August 17, 1864.

Byrd served as an interim commander of the Third Brigade (Third Division) on two occasions: the first from August to December 17, 1863, and the second from June 17 to August 9, 1864.

== Postwar endeavors ==
Byrd served on the state executive committee for the Unconditional Unionist party in 1864. In January 1865, he represented Roane County at the convention in Nashville that reorganized the state government. This convention ordered elections to be held in March, and called for an amendment outlawing slavery.

In August 1865, Byrd ran for the 2nd district seat in Congress. While he expressed support for Abraham Lincoln and endorsed legislation barring ex-Confederates from voting, he was criticized for calling for former slaveholders to be compensated for their freed slaves (Byrd had been a slaveholder before the war). On election day, he captured just over 10% of the vote (1,210 votes out of 12,785) and placed fourth behind Horace Maynard (the victor, with 7,154 votes), Joseph A. Cooper, and Leonidas C. Houk.

By 1867, Byrd had come to support the "Conservative" faction in state politics, which sought leniency toward former Confederates, and opposed civil rights for freed slaves. He afterward supported the Democratic Party, and helped organize the party's campaign efforts in East Tennessee. In 1868, Byrd was appointed federal revenue agent for the Knoxville area, and served in this position until the 1870s.

Throughout the late 1860s and 1870s, Byrd was a persistent advocate of navigational improvements to the Tennessee River. In 1868, he served as a vice president of the Tennessee River Improvement Convention in Chattanooga, and was appointed by the convention to a commission tasked with presenting a proposal to Congress for the removal of navigational hazards along the river. He served as vice president of the second Tennessee River Improvement Convention in 1869.

In 1878, Byrd ran unopposed for the Tennessee Senate seat representing the fifth district, which consisted of Roane, Cumberland, Campbell, Morgan, Scott, Fentress, Overton, White and Putnam counties. During the state debt crisis that dominated state politics in the late 1870s, Byrd vehemently opposed repudiation of the debt and supported the "state credit" faction of the Democratic Party. Describing himself as a "Jeffersonian Democrat," he stated he would "rather have his arm severed" than face the ruin repudiation would bring. In an 1879 interview, Byrd explained that he supported paying the state's debt in full because he didn't want future generations to pass his grave and say, "there lies a damned old repudiationist." He eventually expressed support the "50-4" compromise, a proposal by Governor Albert S. Marks to pay 50% of the state's railroad bond debt at 4% interest, and pay the rest of the debt in full.

In May 1880, Byrd was a delegate to the Democratic National Convention. He sought the state credit faction's nomination for governor later that year, but was defeated by John V. Wright.

== Later life and legacy ==
Byrd was appointed to the Board of Directors for the Knoxville, Cincinnati and Southern Railroad in 1880, and announced plans to build a narrow gauge line from Kingston to Emory Gap (along the Cumberland Plateau) in 1882. He fell ill a short time later, however, and died at his home near Kingston on May 2, 1885. He was interred with his family in Bethel Cemetery in Kingston.

The town of Byrdstown, Tennessee, was named in honor of Byrd in 1879, when it was founded as the county seat of the newly created Pickett County. The new county was located within the fifth district, which Byrd represented at the time in the state senate. In 1890, the East Tennessee Land Company purchased Byrd's 10,000-acre plantation for the establishment of the city of Harriman, Tennessee. A Tennessee Historical Commission marker along Highway 61 in Harriman is dedicated to Byrd.
