= 2nd Tennessee Cavalry Regiment =

2nd Tennessee Cavalry Regiment may refer to:

- 2nd Tennessee (Barteau's) Cavalry Regiment, a Confederate regiment
- 2nd Tennessee Cavalry Regiment (Union), a Union regiment

== See also ==
- 2nd Tennessee Infantry Regiment, a Confederate regiment
- 2nd Tennessee Infantry Regiment (Union)
- 2nd Tennessee Colored Infantry Regiment
- 2nd Tennessee Colored Heavy Artillery Regiment
