= General Henderson =

General Henderson may refer to:

- Archibald Henderson (1783–1859), U.S. Marine Corps brevet brigadier general; longest-serving Commandant
- David Henderson (British Army officer) (1862–1921), British Army lieutenant general
- James Pinckney Henderson (1808–1858), Texan Army brigadier general and first Governor of the State of Texas
- John Henderson (British Army officer) (fl. 1980s–2010s), British Army major general
- John Henderson (Mississippi politician) (1797–1857) Mississippi Militia brigadier general
- Robert Johnson Henderson (1822–1891), Confederate States Army brigadier general (promotion disputed)
- William Henderson (general) (1919–1995), Australian Army major general

== See also ==
- Attorney General Henderson (disambiguation)
