= 4th Tennessee Cavalry Regiment (Union) =

- Active: July 1862 to July 12, 1865
- Country: United States
- Allegiance: Union
- Branch: Cavalry
- Engagements: Siege of Atlanta; Battle of Lovejoy's Station; Battle of Nashville

The 4th Tennessee Cavalry Regiment was a cavalry regiment that served in the Union Army during the American Civil War. It was originally recruited as the 4th East Tennessee Cavalry.

== Service ==
The 4th Tennessee Cavalry was organized at Cumberland Gap and mustered in for a three-year enlistment on February 9, 1863 at Nashville, Tennessee (TN) under the command of Colonel R. M. Edwards. Four companies were organized in Louisville, Kentucky from December 1862 through January 1863.

The cavalry was attached to the posts of:

- Nashville, Department of the Cumberland, to January 1864
- 3rd Brigade, Cavalry Division, XVI Corps, Department of the Tennessee, to April 1864
- 1st Brigade, 4th Division, Cavalry Corps, Army of the Cumberland, to June 1864
- Districts of Nashville and North Alabama, Department of the Cumberland, to October 1864
- 1st Brigade, 4th Division, Cavalry Corps, Military Division Mississippi, to December 1864
- 1st Brigade, 7th Division, Cavalry Corps, Military Division Mississippi, to February 1865
- 2nd Brigade, 7th Division, Cavalry Corps, Military Division Mississippi, to February 1865
- 2nd Brigade, 1st Division, Cavalry Corps, Military Division West Mississippi, to May 1865
- 1st Brigade, 2nd Cavalry Division, West Mississippi, to July 1865

The cavalry was mustered out of service August 14, 1865 in Nashville.

== Detailed service ==
- Duty at Camp Spear, Nashville to August 1863
- Green Hill, to June 14
- Ordered to Carthage, TN to August 30; duty there and at Murfreesboro and Nashville to December
- Action at Friendship Church, September 29
- Expedition to Memphis, TN, December 28–January 4, 1864
- Moved to Colliersville, January 14
- Smith's Expedition to Okolona, Miss., February 11–26
- Coldwater, February 11
- Holly Springs, February 12
- Near Okolona, February 18
- West Point, February 20–21
- Prairie Station, February 21
- Okolona and Tallahatchie River, February 22
- Ordered to Nashville, TN, February 27; duty there to June
- Duty on the line of the Nashville & Chattanooga Railroad and in District of North Alabama to July
- Decatur, Alabama (AL), June 1 (A detachment at Decatur to October 1864)
- Sand Mountain, July
- Rousseau's Opelika Raid from Decatur to West Point & Montgomery Railroad, July 10–22
- Near Coosa River, July 13
- Greenpoint and Ten Island Ford, Coosa River, July 14
- Opetika, Chehaw Station, and near Auburn, July 18
- Siege of Atlanta to August 5
- Scouts to England Cove, TN, July 7–9 and July 12–18 (detachments)
- McCook's Raid on Atlanta & West Point Railroad, July 27–31
- Near Campbellton, July 28
- Lovejoy's Station, July 29
- Clear Creek and near Newnan, July 31
- Chattahoochie River, July 31
- Ordered to Decatur, AL, August 5
- Near Pond Springs, AL, August 9 (detachment)
- Expedition from Decatur to Moulton, August 17–20
- Near Pond Springs August 18–19 (detachment)
- Rousseau's pursuit of Wheeler, September 1–8
- Operations against Forrest in eastern Tennessee, September 16–October 10
- Action at Pulaski, September 26–27
- At Nashville to December
- Action at Owen's Cross Roads, December 1
- Demonstration on Murfreesboro, December 5–7
- Wilkinson's Cross Roads near Murfreesboro, December 7
- Battle of Nashville, December 15–16
- Pursuit of Hood to the Tennessee River, December 17–28
- Hollow Tree Gap, Franklin and West Harpeth River, December 17
- Franklin, December 18
- Rutherford Creek, December 19
- Lynnville, December 23
- Anthony's Hill, December 25
- Sugar Creek, December 25–26
- Hillsboro, December 29
- Near Leighton, December 30
- Narrows, January 2, 1865
- Thorn Hill, January 3
- At Gravelly Springs to February
- Moved to Vicksburg, Miss., thence to New Orleans, Louisiana (LA) and Mobile Bay, AL, February 11–March 23
- Campaign against Mobile and its defenses, March 26-April 9
- Occupation of Mobile, April 12
- March to Montgomery, LA April, 13–25
- Ordered to Mobile April 27
- Expedition from Spring Hill, AL to Baton Rouge, LA, May 8–22
- Ordered to Nashville, May 27
- Garrison duty at Johnsonville to July

== Casualties ==
The regiment lost a total of 234 men during service; 1 officer and 24 enlisted men killed or mortally wounded, 4 officers and 205 enlisted men died of disease or accident.

== Commanders ==
- Colonel R. M. Edwards
- Lieutenant Colonel Jacob Montgomery Thornburgh - commanded at the battle of Nashville

== See also ==
- List of Tennessee Civil War units
- Tennessee in the Civil War
