= Daniel C. Trewhitt =

American attorney, judge and politician

Member of the Tennessee House of Representatives from Hamilton County
- In office October 3, 1859 – October 6, 1861
- Preceded by: J.W. White
- Succeeded by: James R. Hord (Note: Eli Cleveland, a Unionist elected as Trewhitt's successor in August 1861, refused to serve, and the Hamilton seat in the House remained vacant until Hord was elected to the seat in 1865.)

Personal details
- Born: January 29, 1823 Morgan County, Tennessee, U.S.
- Died: January 4, 1891 (aged 67) Chattanooga, Tennessee, U.S.
- Resting place: Forest Hills Cemetery; Chattanooga, Tennessee, U.S.
- Party: Whig; Republican
- Spouse(s): Mary Winnee (1841–1861, her death); Mary Hunter (m. 1865)
- Children: 8
- Profession: Attorney

Military service
- Allegiance: United States
- Branch/service: United States Army
- Years of service: 1861–1864
- Rank: Lieutenant colonel (1861–1862)
- Unit: 2nd Tennessee Volunteer Infantry
- Battles/wars: American Civil War

Daniel Coffee Trewhitt (January 29, 1823 – January 4, 1891) was an American attorney, judge, and politician. He served one term (1859–1861) in the Tennessee House of Representatives, where he was one of the few state legislators to oppose secession on the eve of the Civil War. He represented Hamilton County at the pro-Union East Tennessee Convention, and afterward fought for the Union Army. He served as judge of the state's second chancery division from 1864 to 1870, and judge of the state's fourth circuit court from 1878 to 1891.

== Early life ==
Trewhitt was born along Daddys Creek in what was then Morgan County, Tennessee, but is now part of Cumberland County. He was one of seventeen children of Levi Trewhitt, a county clerk and attorney, and Harriet (Lavender) Trewhitt. In 1836, he moved with his family to Cleveland, Tennessee, where he attended the Oak Grove Academy from 1837 to 1840. He afterward read law under his father, and was licensed to practice in 1847.

After receiving his law license, Trewhitt commenced practice in Harrison, Tennessee, which at the time was the county seat of Hamilton County. In 1854, he ran for district attorney general, but was defeated by rising politician George W. Bridges. He ran unsuccessfully for the Tennessee Senate in 1857, losing to J.C. Burch.

Running on the pro-Union Opposition Party ticket, Trewhitt was elected to Hamilton County's seat in the Tennessee House of Representatives in 1859. Though Southern Democrats had gained control of the state government, Trewhitt joined William H. Wisener, Roderick R. Butler, and Dewitt Clinton Senter in providing persistent opposition to secession in the state legislature during the months leading up the Civil War.

== Civil War ==
Throughout the first half of 1861, Trewhitt canvassed the Hamilton County area, speaking out against secession. He was a delegate to both the Knoxville and Greeneville sessions of the East Tennessee Convention, and represented Hamilton County on the convention's powerful business committee. The convention sought to create a new state in East Tennessee that would remain in the Union. Trewhitt was elected to Hamilton County's seat in the Tennessee Senate in August 1861, but the state having seceded, he instead fled to Kentucky to join the Union Army.

During the Confederate crackdown following the East Tennessee bridge burnings in late 1861, Trewhitt's father, Levi, was arrested and jailed on suspicion of aiding the bridge-burners. Despite pleas for his release, he died in a Confederate prison in Mobile, Alabama, in 1862. His death sparked considerable outrage among East Tennessee's Unionists.

Having joined the 2nd Tennessee Volunteer Infantry with the rank of lieutenant colonel, Trewhitt took part in operations in the Cumberland Gap area in early 1862, and commanded the 2nd Tennessee at the Battle of Mill Springs on January 19 of that year. While stationed at Barbourville, Kentucky, however, he fell ill, and resigned his commission. In April 1862, having recovered, he joined the staff of General James G. Spears of the 3rd brigade with the rank of captain, and was appointed the brigade's Assistant Adjutant General. He was with the brigade at the Battle of Stones River in early 1863, and at the Battle of Chickamauga later that year (though his unit arrived after the battle had mostly ended).

== Postwar activities and judgeship ==
When the East Tennessee Convention reconvened in April 1864, Trewhitt joined Governor Andrew Johnson and Johnson's eventual successor, William G. Brownlow, in endorsing President Abraham Lincoln and the Emancipation Proclamation. He afterward supported the agenda of Brownlow and the Radical Republicans, including a contentious piece of legislation known as the "franchise bill," which barred ex-Confederates from voting. In May 1866, Trewhitt and dozens of other East Tennessee Unionists, frustrated over the state legislature's inability to pass a more restrictive franchise bill, held a convention in Knoxville that once again called for East Tennessee to break away and form a separate state.

In 1864, Johnson appointed Trewhitt chancellor (judge) of the state's second chancery division, which included Chattanooga and surrounding areas of southeastern Tennessee. He held this position until 1870, when the new state constitution restored the voting rights of former Confederates, and he was defeated in his bid for reelection by David M. Key. He then returned to private practice in Chattanooga.

In 1878, Trewhitt ran for the state's fourth circuit court judgeship. On election day, he won easily, capturing 1,222 votes out of 2,017 votes (60%) in a three-way race. During this period, Trewhitt staunchly supported prohibition, going so far as to state, "the greatest battle of the age is now being fought, headed on the one side by Satan in the form of intoxicating liquor, on the other hand by Christianity, morality, sobriety, and decency." He was the Republican nominee for the 3rd district seat in Congress in 1882, but was defeated by the Democratic incumbent, George Dibrell. He was, however, reelected to a second term on the fourth circuit court in 1886.

In 1890, Trewhitt began experiencing symptoms of what was later described as "softening of the brain." He died at his home in Chattanooga on January 4, 1891. He is buried in Chattanooga's Forest Hills Cemetery.

== Family ==
Trewhitt married Mary Melissa Winnee in Gwinnett County, Georgia, in 1841. They had four children: Thomas, Mary Jane, William, and Martha (William and Martha died in childhood). After his first wife died in 1861, he married Mary Melissa Hunter on July 4, 1865. They also had four children: Addison, Alonzo, Paul, and Ellen.

== See also ==
- Alfred Cate
- Richard M. Edwards
