= Attorney General Henderson =

Attorney General Henderson may refer to:

- Alexander Henderson (Canadian politician) (1860–1940), Attorneys General of British Columbia
- Paul Henderson (politician) (born 1962), Attorneys-General of the Northern Territory

== See also ==
- General Henderson (disambiguation)
