= East Tennessee Convention =

Political assembly

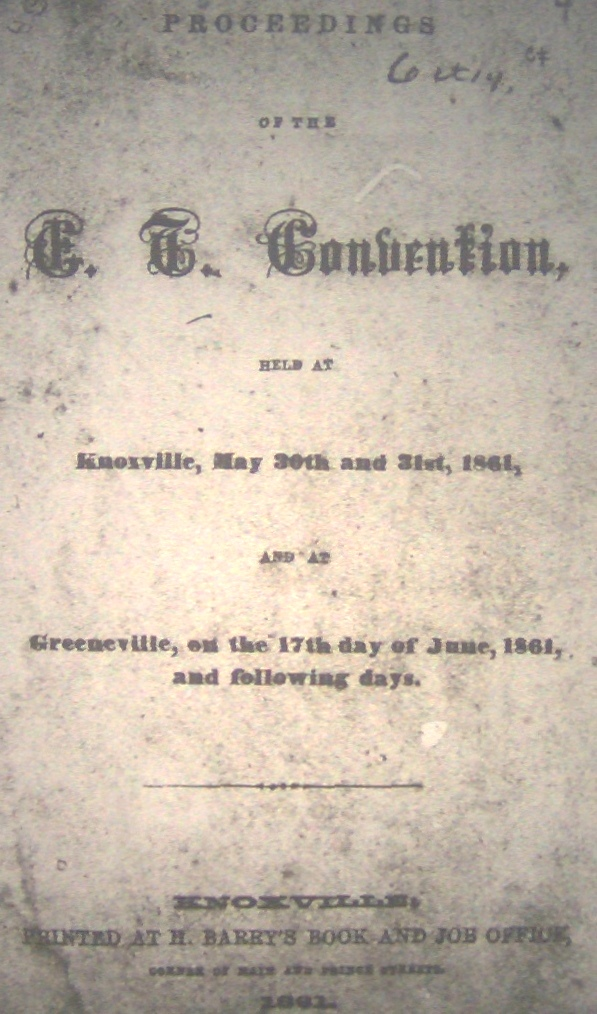
East Tennessee Convention Proceedings title page

The East Tennessee Convention was an assembly of Southern Unionist delegates primarily from East Tennessee that met on three occasions during the Civil War. The convention most notably declared the secessionist actions taken by the Tennessee state government on the eve of the war unconstitutional, and requested that East Tennessee, where Union support remained strong, be allowed to form a separate state that would remain part of the United States split from the rest of Confederate Tennessee (a la West Virginia). The state legislature denied this request, and the Confederate Army occupied the region in late 1861.

The convention first met in Knoxville on May 30–31, 1861, in response to the state government's "Declaration of Independence" from the United States and formation of a military league with the Confederacy. Congressman T. A. R. Nelson was elected president of the convention, and resolutions were adopted denouncing the state government's actions. The convention met for the second time in Greeneville from June 17 to June 20, 1861, after Tennessee had voted to secede from the Union. This second meeting produced a memorial to the state government requesting East Tennessee be allowed to separate from Tennessee. The convention met for a final time in Knoxville from April 12 to April 16, 1864, to address the Emancipation Proclamation and the ten percent plan. This final meeting was marked by bitter divisions over the issue of slavery.

Although it failed in its goal of establishing a Union-aligned state in East Tennessee, the convention played an important role in solidifying leadership and unity of purpose for the region's Unionists. Many of its delegates would serve in federal, state and local offices during the postwar period.

== Background ==
Throughout the first half of the 19th century, East Tennessee was frequently at odds with Tennessee's two other grand divisions, Middle Tennessee and West Tennessee. Many East Tennesseans felt the state legislature showed persistent favoritism toward the other two divisions, especially over funding for internal improvements. In the early 1840s, several East Tennessee leaders, among them Congressman (and future president) Andrew Johnson, led a movement to form a separate state in East Tennessee known as "Franklin." Though this movement was unsuccessful, the idea that East Tennessee should be a separate state periodically resurfaced over the subsequent two decades.

From the late 1830s until the early 1850s, Tennessee was politically divided between the Democratic Party and the Whig Party, with the Whigs drawing much of their support from East Tennessee. The collapse of the Whig Party over the issue of slavery in the mid-1850s left East Tennessee's Whigs in a difficult position. Most Northern Whigs joined the new Republican Party, but Southern Whigs generally found this unpalatable due to the Republicans' anti-slavery sentiments. Some prominent East Tennessee Whigs switched their allegiance to the Democratic Party, though most turned to third party movements, such as the American Party ("Know Nothings"). By the late 1850s, former Whigs, Know Nothings, and a few disgruntled Democrats had formed the Opposition Party to counter rising secessionist sentiment.

Gubernatorial elections in Tennessee had been very competitive during the two decades prior to the election of Isham G. Harris in 1857. The six previous elections had all been decided by less than 2,500 votes (out of over 110,000 votes cast). Whigs relied heavily on East Tennessee and Democrats relied on Middle Tennessee, with West Tennessee generally split. As the sectionalist conflict over the issue of slavery heated up in the late 1850s, however, sentiments in West Tennessee began to shift in favor of the Democrats. Harris, a staunch pro-slavery Southern Democrat, was elected by over 12,000 votes in 1857, and over 8,000 votes in 1859. Democrats also gained control of both chambers of the Tennessee General Assembly in the 1859 cycle.

During the 1860 presidential election, East Tennessee's former Whigs turned to the Constitutional Union Party, a third party which rejected both secession and abolition. This party's candidate, John Bell, was a long-time Whig and native of Tennessee. After Abraham Lincoln won the election in November 1860, Southern Democrats, convinced that Lincoln would abolish slavery, began calling for secession. Following two contentious meetings between secessionists and Unionists in Knoxville in late 1860, Unionist leaders organized rallies in counties throughout East Tennessee to counter rising secessionist sentiment.

The efforts of Tennessee's secessionists culminated in a February 9, 1861, statewide referendum in which voters chose whether or not to hold a convention to consider the issue of secession. After a bitter campaign, the hopes of secessionists appeared to be dashed when Tennessee voters rejected holding the convention, 69,675 votes to 57,789. In East Tennessee, roughly 81% of voters rejected the convention, including majorities in every East Tennessee county with the exception of Sullivan and (by a slight majority) Meigs.

While slavery was a divisive issue nationwide, East Tennessee's Unionists opposed secession for different reasons. There had been an abolitionist movement in East Tennessee in the early 19th century, but it had largely dissolved by the 1840s. By 1860, the region's Unionist leaders opposed both secession and abolition. Many members of the East Tennessee Convention were slave owners, and at least one (William C. Kyle of Hawkins County) was actually a slave trader. Reasons for the strong Unionist movement in East Tennessee typically focus on long-standing political disputes with Middle and West Tennessee, economic differences with the other two divisions (including a significantly smaller slave population relative to the rest of the South), and the region's mountainous isolation.

== First Knoxville session ==
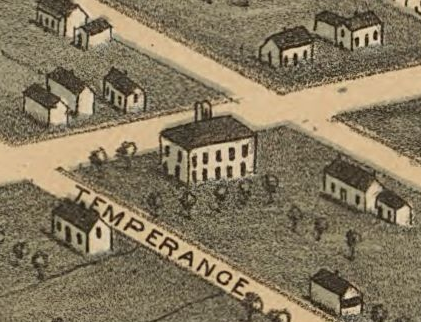
Temperance Hall (center) and adjacent groves in East Knoxville, where the East Tennessee Convention met in May 1861

The Unionists' victory in February 1861 was short-lived. Following the Battle of Fort Sumter on April 12, 1861, sentiments in Tennessee began to shift in favor of secession. Harris rejected Lincoln's call for troops to put down the rebellion, and initiated efforts to align Tennessee with the burgeoning Confederate States of America. In early May, the General Assembly passed legislation establishing a military alliance with the Confederacy and issued a "Declaration of Independence" from the United States. A new referendum was slated for June 8 for Tennessee's voters to choose whether or not to adopt the new Declaration and effectively lead Tennessee into the Confederacy.

Tennessee Unionists blasted the state government's actions as unconstitutional and despotic, but nevertheless began a determined campaign for the June 8 vote. In mid-May, several of Knoxville's Unionist leaders gathered at the Gay Street law office of Oliver Perry Temple, and decided to hold a convention at the end of the month to coordinate strategy. One of them, Connally Trigg, wrote a summons which was published in the Knoxville Whig on May 18. In subsequent days, counties throughout the region held smaller conventions to choose delegates and give them instructions. These county conventions were momentous events, often accompanied by impassioned speeches and brass band performances.

On May 30, the East Tennessee Convention's 469 delegates from 28 East Tennessee counties gathered in a grove near Temperance Hall in East Knoxville. The Reverend Thomas William Humes delivered the opening sermon. Congressman T. A. R. Nelson (of Washington County) was chosen as president, James G. Spears (of Bledsoe) was chosen as vice president, and John M. Fleming (of Knox) was named secretary. Richard D. Wheeler (Campbell), James C. Murphy (Sevier), M. R. May (McMinn), John Williams, Jr. (Knox), and William Heiskell (Monroe) were named assistant vice presidents, and A. L. Greene (Roane), S. P. Doss (Bledsoe), and J. Monroe Meek (Jefferson) were named assistant secretaries.

After delivering a one-hour speech, Nelson appointed a 26-man general committee (or "business" committee), consisting of one delegate for each county (two counties, Marion and Hancock, were represented by proxies). The committee was tasked with drawing up a set of resolutions as a response to the actions of the state government. While the committee was meeting privately, former Congressman Thomas D. Arnold, a member of the Greene County delegation, delivered an explosive two-hour speech to the rest of the convention. On the morning of May 31, Senator Andrew Johnson delivered a three-hour speech.

The business committee announced its proposed resolutions on May 31 (interrupting Johnson's speech), and after a short debate, they were adopted. The resolutions essentially praised freedom of assembly, denounced the legislature's violation of state and federal laws, condemned secessionist leaders, and declared the June 8 vote and the state's formation of a military league with the Confederacy unconstitutional. Nelson, as president, was empowered to summon the convention at a future date and select the place where it would convene.

== Interim ==
Map showing the June 1861 Ordinance of Secession vote in East Tennessee by county. No data could be found for Cumberland and Union counties.

After the convention adjourned, its leaders embarked on a speaking campaign in hopes of once again thwarting secessionists' efforts in the June 8 referendum. Nelson and Johnson, who had been jointly campaigning in the weeks before the convention, resumed their canvass. Fiery newspaper publisher William G. Brownlow defended the convention's actions in the Knoxville Whig. The pro-secession Knoxville Register, on the other hand, blasted the convention, stating it was driven by "selfish motives," and that its resolutions amounted to treason.

On June 8, secessionists prevailed when voters statewide approved the state's secession ordinance by a margin of 108,418 to 46,996. However, while 86% of voters in Middle and West Tennessee approved of the ordinance, nearly 70% of East Tennessee voters still opposed it. A majority of voters in every East Tennessee county opposed the ordinance with the exception of Sullivan, Meigs, Monroe, Rhea, Sequatchie, and Polk.

A county-by-county breakdown of the vote shows that opposition to secession was strongest in the mountainous northern East Tennessee counties, namely Scott (99% against), Sevier (96%), Carter (94%), Campbell (94%), and Anderson (93%). Rhea County showed the most dramatic shift since the February referendum, going from 88% against secession in February to 64% for secession in June. Smaller shifts had taken place in Knox (89% against in February, but only 72% against in June) and Roane (96% against in February, 77% against in June).

== Greeneville session ==
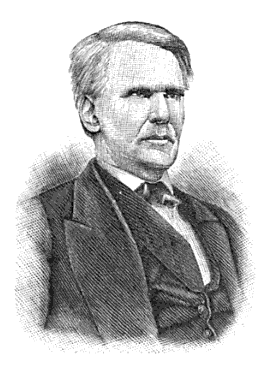
T. A. R. Nelson (president)

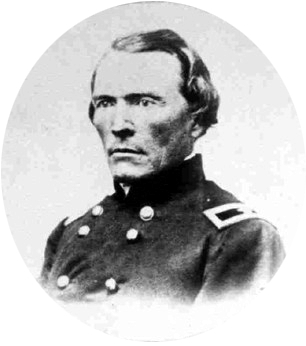
James G. Spears (vice president)

On June 11, 1861, Nelson, using the power granted him during the Knoxville session, ordered the convention to reassemble in Greeneville on June 17. Greeneville was chosen over Knoxville due to threats that had been issued against Knoxville Unionists. On the afternoon of June 17, 285 delegates from across the region convened at the Greene County Courthouse, significantly fewer than the 469 who had met in Knoxville three weeks earlier. Just 130 of the Greeneville delegates had been delegates at the Knoxville session. Rhea County did not send any delegates. Marion, Scott, and Cumberland were represented by proxy. Fentress County, a Middle Tennessee county, was also represented by proxy.

The convention opened with a prayer by the Reverend James Cummings, a member of the Sevier County delegation. Officers from the Knoxville session were retained, and Nelson appointed replacements for business committee members who were not present. Nelson submitted a Declaration of Grievances and a series of resolutions on the evening of the first day, which were immediately referred to the business committee. The next two days were largely consumed by propositions and debate. Oliver Perry Temple, a delegate from Knox, would later write that many of these propositions were "wild and visionary." The lone recorded speech was by John Netherland, a member of the Hawkins delegation who had been the Opposition Party's candidate for governor in 1859. Netherland merely warned against making hasty decisions.

The Declaration of Grievances suggested that the June 8 election outcome was the result of fraud and intimidation in Middle and West Tennessee, and refuted several statements made by pro-secession newspapers deriding the East Tennessee Convention as not representative of general sentiment in East Tennessee. The Declaration rejected the notion that Southerners' rights had been violated, accused secessionist leaders of acting in an undemocratic manner, and argued that secessionist leaders were to blame for dividing the country and plunging the nation into civil war. The Declaration was adopted with little opposition, though the final draft was toned down by Temple and fellow Knox delegate Horace Maynard.

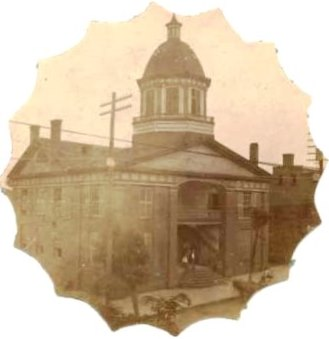
The old Greene County Courthouse in Greeneville, where the East Tennessee Convention met in June 1861

Unlike the Declaration of Grievances, the resolutions proposed by Nelson were debated at length. His proposals essentially stated that the convention would not abide by Tennessee's Declaration of Independence nor would it support the Confederacy; that the counties of East Tennessee would continue as part of the Union as the State of Tennessee; that East Tennessee would remain neutral in any war between the U.S. and the Confederacy, so long as they were left alone; that East Tennessee would resist by force any attempt to station or quarter Confederate troops in the region; that any attack on the region's Unionists would be met with retaliation; and that East Tennessee counties would form military companies for self-defense.

Many delegates felt that Nelson's resolutions were too extreme and provocative, and would likely lead to bloodshed and destruction. On the third day (June 20), Oliver Perry Temple offered an alternate set of resolutions. These essentially stated that the convention desired peace; that the secessionist actions of the state government were unconstitutional; that the convention would seek the state legislature's permission to form a new state; and that a convention for the proposed state would be held at Kingston. The president (Nelson) would choose the date of this convention, and the counties would be represented proportionally (i.e., Knox would have three delegates, Greene, Jefferson, and Washington would each have two, and all other counties would have one).

Heated debate on the convention floor followed Temple's proposals. Supporters of Nelson's resolutions, among them Thomas D. Arnold and Robert Johnson of Greene, William J. Clift of Hamilton, William B. Carter of Carter, James G. Spears of Bledsoe, and Leonidas C. Houk of Anderson, accused the supporters of Temple's resolutions of acting out of fear. Temple's supporters, among them Horace Maynard and John Baxter of Knox, Montgomery Thornburgh of Jefferson, and Joseph A. Cooper of Campbell, argued that Nelson's supporters were being irrational and acting out of anger. On the morning of the fourth day (June 21), the business committee voted in favor of Temple's resolutions. Johnson motioned to reinstate Nelson's resolutions, however, and the debate began anew. A speech by Maynard apparently turned the tide, and Temple's resolutions were adopted "seriatim una voce."

Temple, Netherland, and Greene County delegate James P. McDowell were chosen to deliver to the legislature a memorial requesting East Tennessee be allowed to form a separate state. A motion by Netherland allowed delegates to continue serving in the Tennessee General Assembly. A motion by James Maxwell warned that if Confederate troops moving through the region continued to harass Unionists, Unionists would retaliate (a regiment of Louisiana Tigers passing through Greeneville had harassed the convention delegates, stealing their breakfast and cutting down an American flag). William C. Kyle and his brother-in-law John Blevins, both delegates from Hawkins, issued a general protest of the convention's proceedings, but did not elaborate.

The Tennessee General Assembly received the convention's memorial on June 28, 1861, and appointed a joint committee to consider its resolutions. The committee consisted of 13 state senators and state representatives, and was chaired by state senator Jordan Stokes and state representative George Gantt. Six of the committee members were from East Tennessee, though there is no evidence they were present at its proceedings. In its report issued on June 29, the committee questioned whether or not the convention was truly representative of East Tennessee, and expressed hope that East Tennesseans would eventually come around and accept the results of the June 8 referendum. It stated no action would be taken until the next legislative session.

== Civil War and second Knoxville session ==
Shortly after the convention adjourned, Brownlow's Whig declared, "It is now for the Secessionists in the Legislature to say whether we shall separate in peace, or have a disastrous Civil War." The New York Times praised the convention, stating, "Literally surrounded on all sides by infuriate enemies, the bold mountaineers of Tennessee have dared to be free." Pro-secession newspapers blasted the convention. The Knoxville Register described the Convention as "a few tory leaders of Knoxville and King Nelson," and accused them of trying to ignite bloodshed by inviting federal soldiers to the region. The Memphis Appeal referred to the Convention as "Traitors in Council," and the Nashville Patriot derided the convention's "Declaration of Grievances" as "unworthy a free, just and magnanimous people."

On July 10, 1861, T. A. R. Nelson issued a call for the Kingston convention (which would organize a new state) to assemble on August 31. In subsequent weeks, Confederate troops under Felix K. Zollicoffer occupied East Tennessee, however, and this meeting never took place. Nelson, who was a member of Congress, attempted to flee to Washington, D.C. but was captured and held in Virginia. He was released after agreeing to remain neutral during the war. George W. Bridges, another convention delegate who was elected to Congress, was arrested and held for several months before managing to escape. William G. Brownlow, one of the region's most celebrated Unionists, was arrested and jailed for several weeks before being allowed to flee to the North. Attorneys John Baxter and Oliver Perry Temple remained in Knoxville for much of the war, and rendered assistance to Unionists facing charges in Confederate courts.

Numerous Convention delegates served in the Union Army. At the convention's Greeneville session, Robert K. Byrd (of Roane), Joseph A. Cooper (of Campbell), Richard M. Edwards (of Bradley), S. C. Langley (of Morgan), and William J. Clift (of Hamilton) made a secret pact to return to their respective homes and raise troops to defend the region. Others would flee across the border to Kentucky to join the Union army. Cooper and James G. Spears would both rise to the rank of general. More than two dozen convention delegates would achieve the rank of colonel, and numerous others served as lower-ranking officers.

Perhaps the most brazen wartime act in which East Tennessee Convention delegates engaged was the East Tennessee bridge-burning conspiracy, an attempt to destroy nine railroad bridges across the region to make way for a Union invasion. William B. Carter, who had been a member of the Carter County delegation at the convention, was the mastermind behind the conspiracy. He was aided by Hamilton County delegate Alfred Cate, Anderson County delegate William Cross, and Sevier County delegate Daniel M. Ray. On the night of November 8, 1861, the conspirators destroyed five of the nine targeted bridges, but the Union Army balked at an invasion. In response to the bridge burnings, Zollicoffer instituted martial law in East Tennessee.

Many Convention delegates suffered greatly as a result of their Union sympathies, and some died. Tolliver Staples, a Morgan County delegate, was captured in Kentucky in 1863, and executed by Champ Ferguson's men. John McGaughey, a delegate from McMinn, was executed by Confederate guerillas in early 1865. Montgomery Thornburgh, a Jefferson County delegate, died in a Confederate prison in Tuscaloosa. Hamilton County delegate William J. Clift nearly died from injuries sustained during his escape from a Confederate prison in Atlanta. Convention secretary John M. Fleming and Sevier County delegate Robert H. Hodsden were arrested and detained by Confederate authorities in December 1861, but were subsequently cleared by a Confederate court.

=== Second Knoxville session ===
President Lincoln's Emancipation Proclamation, issued in early 1863, divided Tennessee's Unionists. While Andrew Johnson, who had been appointed the state's military governor, supported the Proclamation, other prominent Unionists, including T. A. R. Nelson and former congressman Emerson Etheridge, opposed it, arguing it would serve only to postpone a Union victory in the war. By mid-1863, Johnson was under pressure from Lincoln to hold elections in the state. He continuously hesitated, however, as he was concerned that Unionists who opposed the Proclamation (known as "Conservative Unionists") would prevail. Conservative Unionists thus grew increasingly frustrated with Johnson over his emancipation stance and his refusal to hold elections.

At Johnson's request, the East Tennessee Convention reassembled at the Knox County Courthouse in Knoxville on April 12, 1864 (the date was chosen as the third anniversary of the attack on Fort Sumter). The purpose of this session was to discuss Lincoln's ten percent plan, which allowed any former Confederate state to reenter the Union if ten percent of its prewar voting population took the Oath of Allegiance and pledged to support emancipation. Just 160 delegates from 23 counties attended, substantially fewer than the first two sessions.

The April 1864 session of the East Tennessee Convention was wrought with infighting. Johnson opened the convention with a speech attacking slavery, but it quickly became clear that Conservative Unionists, led by Nelson, John Baxter, Frederick Heiskell, and William B. Carter, were in the majority. Those who supported emancipation, led by Brownlow and Daniel C. Trewhitt, called for "immediate and unconditional emancipation" and the arming of black soldiers, and endorsed Lincoln for president. The Conservative Unionists endorsed General George McClellan for president, and called for leniency toward former Confederates.

The arguments quickly became personal. Baxter was ruthlessly assailed for having taken the Confederate oath, and a motion to allow only truly loyal men at the convention failed by a narrow vote. Heiskell accused Brownlow of selling out to northerners over the issue of slavery. After four days, with the convention hopelessly deadlocked, Sam Milligan, a lifelong friend of Johnson, motioned successfully for the Convention to adjourn sine die, leaving the debate unresolved.

== Postwar period ==
Andrew Johnson, who had been serving as Tennessee's military governor since 1862, was elected Vice President of the United States in November 1864 and was elevated to the presidency after Lincoln was assassinated in April 1865. William "Parson" Brownlow, a member of the convention's Knox delegation, was elected Governor of Tennessee in January 1865. More than a dozen former delegates would serve in the state legislature during war's aftermath, including Alfred Cate (Hamilton), William Mullenix (Sullivan), Beriah Frazier (Knox), Wilson Duggan (Sevier), Charles Inman (Sevier), and Stephen Matthews (Blount). Samuel R. Rodgers, a Knox delegate, served as Speaker of the Tennessee Senate, and William Heiskell, a Monroe delegate, served as Speaker of the Tennessee House of Representatives.

The Unionist-dominated state government was bitterly divided during the postwar period between Conservative Republicans, allies of Andrew Johnson who preferred a return to a prewar state of affairs (though with emancipation intact), and the Radical Republicans, allies of Brownlow who sought civil rights for blacks and retribution against former Confederates. Conservatives, badly outnumbered, used parliamentary tactics such as quorum busts to thwart Radical initiatives, leading to frequent showdowns in the House and Senate. In spite of these divisions, the state government ratified the Thirteenth and Fourteenth amendments to the U.S. Constitution, allowing Tennessee to become the first former Confederate state readmitted to the Union in 1866.

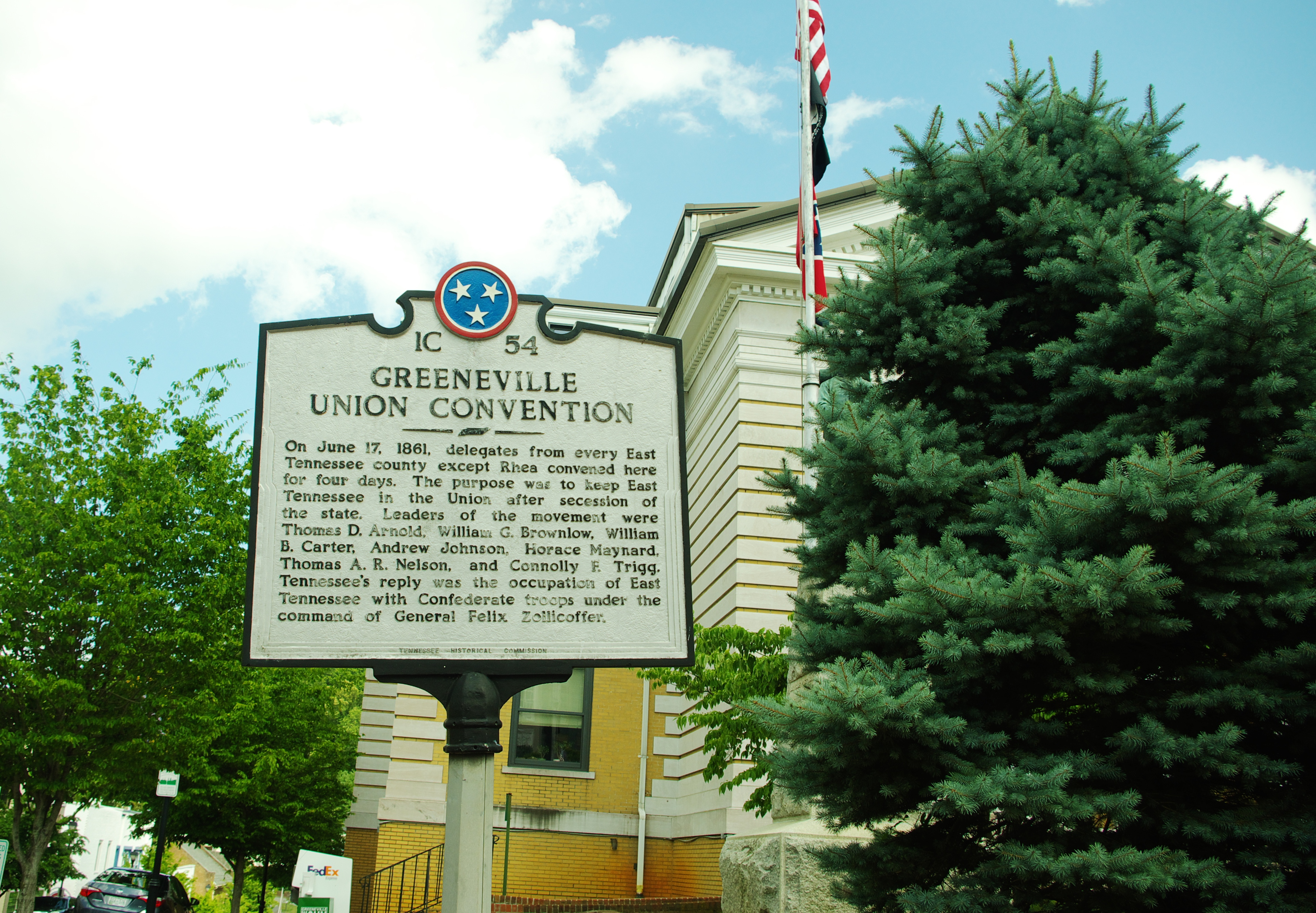
Tennessee Historical Commission marker in Greeneville, recalling the East Tennessee Convention's June 1861 session

Dewitt Clinton Senter, who had been a member of the convention's Grainger County delegation, succeeded Brownlow as governor, and initiated efforts to restore the rights of ex-Confederates. At the state's 1870 constitutional convention, which wrote its current constitution, former East Tennessee Convention delegate John Baxter led the committee that drafted the document's Declaration of Rights. Former delegates William B. Carter, John Netherland, and William B. Staley (of Roane County) were also at the constitutional convention.

Numerous East Tennessee Convention members would win election or appointment to higher offices. Following his term as governor, Brownlow served a term (1869–1875) in the U.S. Senate. David T. Patterson, a Greene County delegate, also served in the Senate (1866–1869). Leonidas C. Houk (Anderson), William Crutchfield (Hamilton), William McFarland (Jefferson), Roderick R. Butler (Johnson), and Horace Maynard (Knox), would serve in Congress, and Maynard would serve as U.S. Postmaster General. Baxter and Connally Trigg, both of Knox, served as federal judges, James W. Deaderick (Washington) served as chief justice of the Tennessee Supreme Court, and several former delegates, including Oliver Perry Temple (Knox), David K. Young (Anderson), and Daniel C. Trewhitt (Hamilton), served as lower state court judges.

Thomas William Humes, who delivered the sermon at the East Tennessee Convention's initial session in May 1861, served as president of East Tennessee University after the war, and oversaw its transition to the University of Tennessee in the 1870s. John J. Craig, a member of the Knox delegation, was instrumental in the development of the Tennessee marble industry during the latter half of the 19th century.

The East Tennessee Convention has received only scant coverage in Civil War histories. William Rule, a protégé of Brownlow and friend of Temple, briefly discusses the convention in his booklet, The Loyalists of Tennessee in the Late War (1887). The convention was covered in greater detail in Humes's Loyal Mountaineers of Tennessee (1888). Oliver Perry Temple, who had been an integral figure at the convention and had possession of Secretary John Fleming's minutes, gave an extensive description of the convention in his book, East Tennessee and the Civil War (1898), and provided biographies of several convention delegates in Notable Men of Tennessee (1912). Charles F. Bryan, Jr., provided a modern analysis of the convention in his article, "A Gathering of Tories," which appeared in Tennessee Historical Quarterly in 1980.

== Convention delegates ==
In 1980, historian Charles F. Bryan, Jr., performed a demographic analysis of a random sample of forty-six East Tennessee Convention delegates. While the delegates included merchants, attorneys, physicians, ministers, and artisans, a majority were "moderately wealthy" farmers. Most of the convention's leaders were attorneys or politicians. Approximately three-fourths of Bryan's sample were over the age of 40, with the oldest being 76 and the youngest 22. Roughly 41% of the sample were slaveholders, though most owned fewer than five slaves. The wealthiest delegate by far was Knoxville attorney John Baxter, with over $100,000 in assets in 1860.

The vast majority of the East Tennessee Convention delegates were former Whigs, though several were Democrats, including Andrew Johnson's sons, Charles and Robert, and son-in-law, David T. Patterson (all of Greene), along with James G. Spears of Bledsoe, William J. Clift of Hamilton, George W. Bridges of McMinn, and Richard M. Edwards of Bradley. While most had never held political office, the convention did include three who had served in the U.S. Congress (T. A .R. Nelson, Thomas D. Arnold, and Horace Maynard) and a former state attorney general (James P. Swann of Jefferson). At least two dozen delegates had served in the state legislature, and three were members of the legislature then in session (33rd General Assembly). William Swan of Knox and John Reeves of Greene were county sheriffs.

=== List of Business Committee members ===
County	Knoxville	Greeneville	Notes
Anderson	David K. Young	Leonidas Houk	
Bledsoe	S. P. Doss	James G. Spears	
Blount	William T. Dowell	William T. Dowell	
Bradley	Richard M. Edwards	Richard M. Edwards	
Campbell	David Hart	Joseph A. Cooper	
Carter	James P. T. Carter	William B. Carter	
Claiborne	E. E. Jones	E. E. Jones	
Cocke	P. Easterly	P. Easterly	
Cumberland	A. C. Yates	Robert K. Byrd (proxy)	Byrd was a member of the Roane County delegation
Fentress	None	E. S. Langley (proxy)	Langley was a member of the Morgan County delegation
Grainger	Harman Lea	Harman Lea	
Greene	James P. McDowell	James P. McDowell	
Hamilton	Daniel C. Trewhitt	Daniel C. Trewhitt	
Hancock	William G. Brownlow and William C. Kyle (proxies)	Charles Barton	Brownlow was a member of the Knox delegation; Kyle was a member of the Hawkins delegation
Hawkins	William C. Kyle	John Netherland	
Jefferson	William McFarland	James P. Swann	
Johnson	Alexander E. Smith	A. T. Smith	
Knox	Connally Trigg	Connally Trigg	Trigg served as the committee chairman
Marion	William G. Brownlow (proxy)	William G. Brownlow (proxy)	Brownlow was a member of the Knox delegation
McMinn	George W. Bridges	George W. Bridges	
Meigs	T. J. Mathews	T. J. Mathews	
Monroe	Daniel Heiskell	William Heiskell	
Morgan	Benjamin Tolliver Staples	Jesse Stonecipher	
Polk	C. M. McCleary	William M. Biggs	
Roane	John Wester	William B. Staley	
Scott	None	Samuel C. Honeycutt (proxy)	
Sevier	Samuel Pickens	Samuel Pickens	
Sullivan	William Mullenix	Robert L. Stanford	
Union	Isaac Bayless	Isaac Bayless	
Washington	Samuel T. Logan	James W. Deaderick	Deaderick had to leave early on the fourth day, and was replaced by S.K.N. Patton for that day's afternoon session

== See also ==
- State of Franklin
- Wheeling Convention, a similar convention held in what is now present day West Virginia in the city of Wheeling
