= 1st Independent Battery Wisconsin Light Artillery =

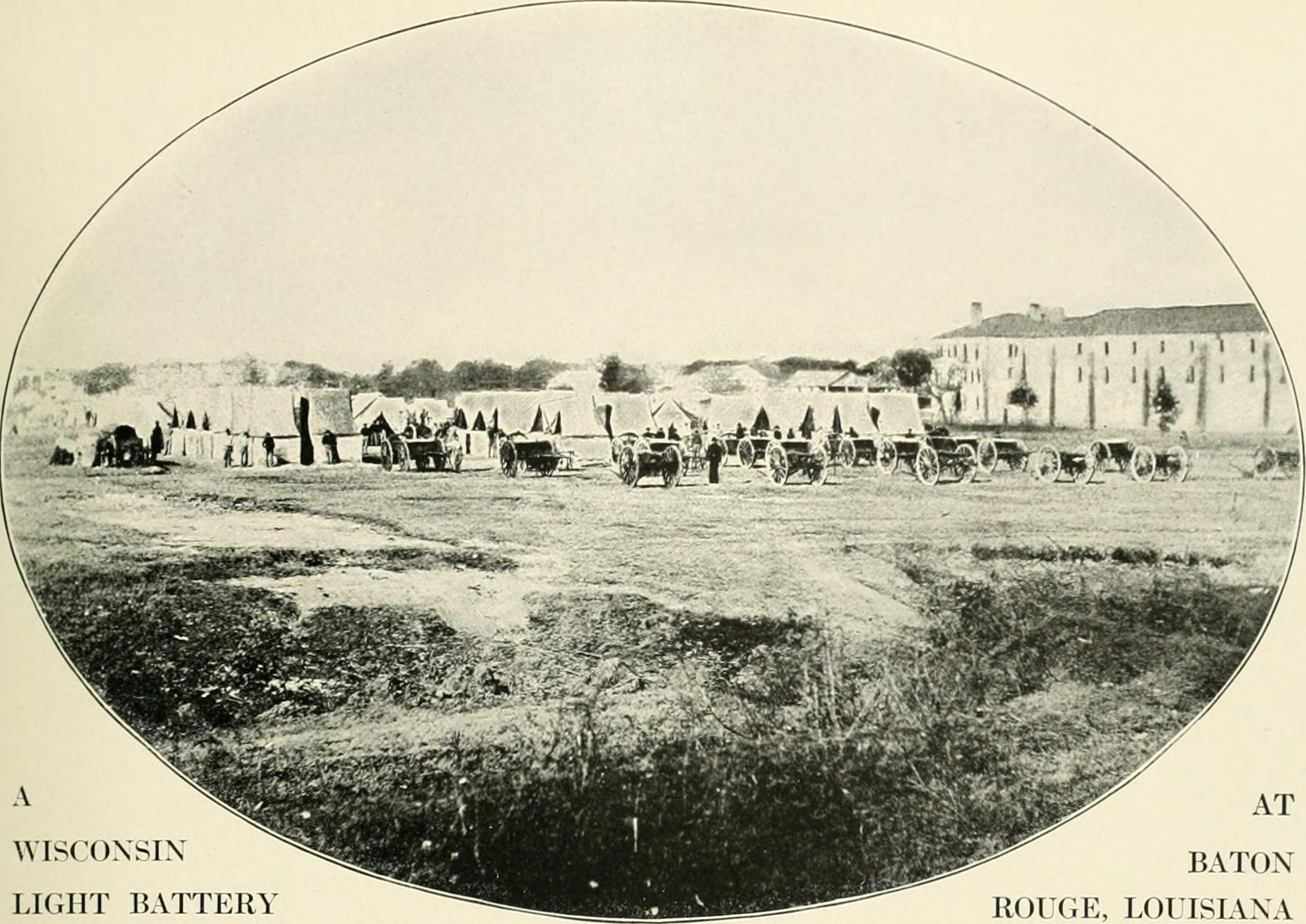
- Wisconsin Light Artillery at Baton Rouge, Louisiana
- Active: 10 Oct. 1861 – 18 July 1865
- Country: United States
- Allegiance: (United States) Union; Wisconsin
- Branch: Union Army
- Type: Field Artillery
- Size: Artillery Battery
- Equipment: 8 x 10-pounder Parrott rifles (June 1862)
- Engagements: American Civil War; Battle of the Cumberland Gap (1862); Battle of Chickasaw Bayou (1862); Battle of Arkansas Post (1863); Battle of Port Gibson (1863); Battle of Champion Hill (1863); Siege of Vicksburg (1863); Jackson Expedition (1863); Red River Campaign (1864)

Commanders
- Notable commanders: Jacob T. Foster

The 1st Independent Battery Wisconsin Light Artillery was an artillery battery from Wisconsin that served in the Union Army during the American Civil War.

== Armament ==
In June 1862 at the Battle of the Cumberland Gap, Foster's 1st Wisconsin Battery was equipped with eight 10-pounder Parrott rifles. On 13 August 1863, the battery was re-armed with 30-pounder Parrott rifles.

== Organization ==
Organized at LaCrosse, Wis., and mustered in on October 10, 1861. Moved to Camp Utley, Racine, Wis., and duty there until January 23, 1862. Ordered to Louisville, Ky., January 23, and duty there until April 3. Attached to Artillery, 7th Division, Army of the Ohio, to October, 1862. Cumberland Division, District of West Virginia, Dept. of the Ohio, to November, 1862. Artillery, 9th Division, Right Wing 13th Army Corps (Old), Dept. of the Tennessee, to December, 1862. Artillery, 3rd Division, Sherman's Yazoo Expedition, to January, 1863. Artillery, 9th Division, 13th Army Corps, Army of the Tennessee, to July, 1863. 4th Brigade, 1st Division, 13th Army Corps, Army of the Tennessee, to August, 1863, and Dept. of the Gulf to August, 1863. Defenses of New Orleans, La., Dept. of the Gulf, to January, 1864. Artillery, 1st Division, 13th Army Corps, to June, 1864. District of Morganza, Dept. of the Gulf, to August, 1864. Artillery, Cavalry Division, Dept. of the Gulf, to February, 1865. Cavalry Brigade, District of Baton Rouge, La., to July, 1865.

== Detailed service ==
Cumberland Gap Campaign April 3-June 18, 1862. Occupation of Cumberland Gap June 18 to September 17. Evacuation of Cumberland Gap and retreat to Greenupsburg, Ky., and to the Ohio River September 17-October 3. Expedition to Charleston, W. Va., October 21-November 10. Ordered to Cincinnati, Ohio, November 20; thence to Memphis, Tenn., November 26. Sherman's Yazoo Expedition December 20, 1862, to January 3, 1863. Chickasaw Bayou December 26–28. Chickasaw Bluff December 29. Expedition to Arkansas Post, Ark., January 3–10, 1863. Assault and capture of Fort Hindman, Arkansas Post, January 10–11. Moved to Young's Point, La., January 14–23, and duty there until March 8. Moved to Milliken's Bend, La., March 8. Operations from Milliken's Bend to New Carthage March 31-April 17. Movement on Bruinsburg and turning Grand Gulf April 25–30. Battle of Port Gibson May 1. Battle of Champion's Hill May 16. Big Black River May 17. Siege of Vicksburg, Miss., May 18-July 4. Assaults on Vicksburg May 19 and 22. Advance on Jackson, Miss., July 4–10. Near Clinton July 8. Siege of Jackson July 10–17. Battery refitted with 30-lb. Parrott's and ordered to the Dept. of the Gulf August 13. Duty at Carrollton until September 3. Moved to Brashear City September 3–4, and to Berwick City September 24. Western Louisiana Campaign October 3-November 30. Duty at Brashear City until December. Moved to New Orleans and duty there until April 22, 1864. Red River Campaign April–May. Moved to Alexandria April 22–28, and duty there until May 13. Retreat to Morganza May 13–20. At Morganza and New Orleans until August, then moved to Baton Rouge, La. Bayou Letsworth August 11. Expedition to Clinton August 23–29. Olive Branch, Comite River and Clinton August 25. Expedition to Clinton, Greensburg and Camp Moore October 5–9. Expedition to Brookhaven, Miss., November 14–21. Liberty Creek November 15. Jackson November 21. Davidson's Expedition to Mobile & Ohio Railroad November 26-December 13. Duty at New Orleans and Baton Rouge until July, 1865. Mustered out July 18, 1865.

== Total strength and casualties ==
The 1st Independent Battery initially recruited 155 officers and men. An additional 114 men were recruited as replacements, for a total of 269 men.

The battery suffered five enlisted men killed or died from wounds in action, and one officer and 22 enlisted men who died of disease, for a total of 28 fatalities.

== Commanders ==
- Captain Jacob T. Foster
- Captain Daniel Webster

== See also ==
- List of Wisconsin Civil War units
- Wisconsin in the American Civil War
