= 6th Tennessee Infantry Regiment (Union) =

6th Regiment Tennessee Volunteer Infantry
- Active: April 18, 1862 - May 17, 1865
- Country: United States
- Allegiance: Union
- Branch: Infantry
- Type: Regiment
- Engagements: Battle of the Cumberland Gap (1862); Atlanta campaign Battle of Rocky Face Ridge; Battle of Resaca; Battle of Kennesaw Mountain; Siege of Atlanta; Battle of Jonesboro; Battle of Spring Hill; Second Battle of Franklin; Battle of Nashville; Carolinas campaign

Commanders
- Notable commanders: Joseph Alexander Cooper

The 6th Regiment Tennessee Volunteer Infantry was an infantry regiment that served in the Union Army during the American Civil War.

== Service ==
The 6th Tennessee Infantry was organized at Williamsburg and Boston, Kentucky and mustered in for a three-year enlistment on April 18, 1862.

The regiment was attached to 25th Brigade, 7th Division, Army of the Ohio, to October 1862. 1st Brigade, District of West Virginia, Department of the Ohio, to November 1862. 1st Brigade, 2nd Division, Center, XIV Corps, Army of the Cumberland, to January 1863. 1st Brigade, 2nd Division, XIV Corps, to April 1863. District of Central Kentucky, Department of the Ohio, to June 1863. 3rd Brigade, 3rd Division, XXIII Corps, Army of the Ohio, to August 1863. 3rd Brigade, 3rd Division, Reserve Corps, Army of the Cumberland, to October 1863. 2nd Brigade, 2nd Division, XIV Corps, to November 1863. Spear's Tennessee Brigade, Chattanooga, Tennessee, to December 1863. Spear's Tennessee Brigade, 2nd Division, XXIII Corps, to January 1864. 3rd Brigade, Rousseau's 3rd Division, XII Corps, Department of the Cumberland, to April 1864. 1st Brigade, 2nd Division, XXIII Corps, Army of the Ohio, to February 1865. 1st Brigade, 2nd Division, XXIII Corps, Department of North Carolina, to May 1865.

The 6th Tennessee Infantry mustered out of service at Nashville, Tennessee April 2-May 17, 1865.

== Detailed service ==
Moved to Cumberland Ford April 1862. Cumberland Gap Campaign April to June. Big Creek Gap June 11, 12 and 15. Occupation of Cumberland Gap June 18-September 17. Wallace Cross Roads July 15. Big Creek Gap September 4. Expedition to Pine Mountain September 6–10. Pine Mountain September 7 (Company B). Evacuation of Cumberland Gap and retreat to Greenupsburg, Ky., September 17-October 3. Goose Creek Salt Works September 19. Near Gallipolis, Ohio, and operations in the Kanawha Valley, W. Va., until November. Ordered to Louisville, Ky., then to Cincinnati, Ohio, and Nashville, Tenn. Duty at Nashville until January 1863. Guard trains from Nashville to Murfreesboro January 2–3. Action at Cox's or Blood's Hill January 3. Manchester Pike January 5. At Nashville until April, and at Carthage, Tenn., until August. Ordered to McMinnville August 31. March to Chattanooga September 12–20. Sequatchie Valley September 21–23. Action at Missionary Ridge and Shallow Ford Gap September 22. Near Summerville September 23. At Sale Creek until December. Ordered to Kingston, Tenn. Action at Kingston December 4. Duty near Knoxville and operations in eastern Tennessee until April 1864. Atlanta Campaign May to September. Demonstrations on Dalton May 5–13. Rocky Faced Ridge May 8–11. Battle of Resaca May 14–15. Pursuit to Cassville May 18–19. Etowah River May 20. Operations on Pumpkin Vine Creek and battles about Dallas, New Hope Church, and Allatoona Hills May 2-June 5. Kingston May 27. Allatoona May 26–29. Pine Mountain June 3–7. Operations about Marietta and against Kennesaw Mountain June 10-July 2. Lost Mountain June 15–17. Muddy Creek June 17. Noyes Creek June 19–20. Kolb's Farm June 22. Assault on Kennesaw June 27. Nicka-Jack Creek July 2–5. Vining Station July 4. Chattahoochie River July 6–17. Decatur July 19. Howard House July 20. Siege of Atlanta July 22-August 25. Utoy Creek August 5–7. Flank movement on Jonesboro August 25–30. Lovejoy's Station September 2–6. Pursuit of Hood into Alabama October 3–26. Nashville Campaign November–December. Guard fords of Duck River until November 28. Spring Hill November 29. Battle of Franklin November 30. Battle of Nashville December 15–16. Pursuit of Hood to the Tennessee River December 17–28. At Clifton, Tenn., until January 15, 1865. Movement to Washington, D.C., thence to Fort Fisher, N.C., January 15-February 15. Fort Anderson February 18. Town Creek February 20. Capture of Wilmington February 22. Carolinas Campaign March 1 to April 26. Advance on Kingston and Goldsboro March 6–21. Relieved for muster out March 31, and ordered to Nashville, Tenn.

== Casualties ==
The regiment lost a total of 201 men during service; 1 officer and 43 enlisted men killed or mortally wounded, 157 enlisted men died of disease or accident.

== Commanders ==
- Colonel (later Brigadier General and Brevet Major General) Joseph Alexander Cooper
- Lieutenant Colonel Edward Maynard - commanded at the Battle of Nashville

== See also ==
- List of Tennessee Civil War units
- Tennessee in the Civil War
