= 2nd Tennessee Infantry Regiment =

- Active: September 28, 1861, to August 3, 1865
- Country: United States
- Allegiance: Union
- Branch: Union Army
- Type: Infantry
- Size: Regiment
- Nickname(s): 2nd East Tennessee Infantry
- Engagements: American Civil War: Battle of Mill Springs; Battle of the Cumberland Gap; Battle of Stones River (supply train guard); Morgan's Raid; Knoxville Campaign; Second Battle of the Cumberland Gap; Battle of Blue Springs; Battle of Campbell's Station; Battle of Bean's Station; Battle of Mossy Creek; Battle of Dandridge; Battle of Fair Garden

The 2nd Tennessee Infantry Regiment was an infantry regiment that served in the Union Army during the American Civil War.

== Service ==
The 2nd Tennessee Infantry was organized at Camp Dick Robinson in Garrard County, Kentucky and at Somerset, Kentucky and mustered in for a three-year enlistment on September 28, 1861.

The regiment was attached to George H. Thomas' Command, Army of the Ohio, to November 1861. 12th Brigade, Army of the Ohio, to December 1861. 12th Brigade, 1st Division, Army of the Ohio, to February 1862. 24th Brigade, 7th Division, Army of the Ohio, to October 1862. 3rd Brigade, District of West Virginia, Department of the Ohio, to November 1862. 1st Brigade, 2nd Division, Center, XIV Corps, Army of the Cumberland, to January 1863. 1st Brigade, 2nd Division, XIV Corps, to April 1863. 2nd Brigade, District of Central Kentucky, Department of the Ohio, to June 1863. 1st Brigade, 1st Division, XXIII Corps, Department of the Ohio, to August 1863. 3rd Brigade, 4th Division, XXIII Corps, to November 1863. 1st Brigade, 2nd Division, Cavalry Corps, Department of the Ohio, to April 1864. 2nd Brigade, 4th Division, XXIII Corps, to February 1865. 2nd Brigade, 4th Division, District of East Tennessee, to August 1865.

The 2nd Tennessee Infantry mustered out of service on August 3, 1865.

== Detailed service ==
Duty at Camp Dick Robinson, Ky., until January 1862. Battle of Logan's Cross Roads January 19. At London and covering Cumberland Gap until March. Skirmishes at Big Creek Gap and Jacksborough March 14 (Company B). Reconnaissance to Cumberland Gap and skirmish March 21–23. Cumberland Gap Campaign March 28-June 18. Occupation of Cumberland Gap June 18-September 17. Tazewell July 22. Skirmish near Cumberland Gap August 27. Operations at Rogers and Big Creek Gaps September 10. Evacuation of Cumberland Gap and retreat to Greenupsburg, Ky., September 17-October 3. Operations in Kanawha Valley, W. Va., until November. Ordered to Louisville, Ky., Cincinnati, Ohio, and thence to Nashville, Tenn. Duty there until January 1863. Guard trains from Nashville to Murfreesboro, Tenn., January 2–3. Cox's or Blood's Hill January 3. Ordered to Lexington, Ky., March 11. Duty in District of Central Kentucky until August. At Somerset, Ky., May. Liberty May 25. Pursuit of Morgan July. Operations in eastern Kentucky against Scott July 25-August 6. Burnside's Campaign in eastern Tennessee August 1863 to February 1864. Winter's Gap August 31, 1863. Expedition to Cumberland Gap September 4–9. Tazewell September 5. Capture of Cumberland Gap September 9. Carter's Station September 20, 21 and 22. Zollicoffer September 20–21 and September 24. Jonesboro September 21 and 28. Blue Springs October 5–10. Sweetwater October 10–11. Pursuit to Bristol October 11–17. Blountsville October 13–14. Bristol October 15. Knoxville Campaign November 4-December 23. Near Loudon and Stock Creek November 15. Marysville November 15. Lenoir Station November 15. Campbell's Station November 16. Defense of Cumberland Gap during siege of Knoxville November 17-December 5. Walker's Ford, Clinch River, December 5. Rutledge December 7. Clinch Mountain December 9. Moresburg December 10. Morristown December 10. Cheex's Cross Roads December 12. Russellville December 12–13. Bean's Station December 14. Rutledge December 16. Blain's Cross Roads December 16–19. New Market December 25. Operations about Dandridge and Mossy Creek December 24–28. Mossy Creek December 26. Talbot's Station December 29. Shoal Creek, Ala., January 14, 1864. Operations about Dandridge January 16–17. Kimbrough's Cross Roads January 16. Dandridge January 17. Operations about Dandridge January 26. Fair Garden January 27. Duty at Knoxville and Loudon until August 1864. Operations against Wheeler in eastern Tennessee August 15–31. Duty at Knoxville and in eastern Tennessee until March 1865. Ordered to Cumberland Gap March 16, and duty there until August.

== Casualties ==
The regiment lost a total of 640 men during service; 3 officers and 24 enlisted men killed or mortally wounded, 4 officers and 609 enlisted men died of disease or accident.

== Commanders ==
- Colonel James P. T. Carter
- Lieutenant Colonel Daniel C. Trewhitt - briefly commanded in January 1862
- Lieutenant Colonel James M. Melton - commanded during the Battle of Stones River

== See also ==
- List of Tennessee Civil War units
- Tennessee in the Civil War
