= James G. Spears =

American politician and general

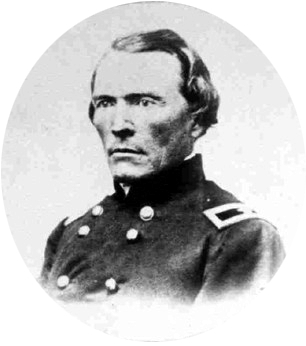
- Born: March 29, 1816; Bledsoe County, Tennessee, U.S.
- Died: July 22, 1869 (aged 53); Bledsoe County, Tennessee, U.S.
- Burial place: Pikeville City Cemetery; Pikeville, Tennessee, U.S.
- Military career
- Allegiance: United States of America; Union
- Branch: United States Army; Union Army
- Service years: 1861–1864
- Rank: Brigadier General
- Commands: 1st Tennessee Infantry Regiment; 25th Brigade, Army of the Ohio; 1st Brigade, 2nd Division, XIV Corps
- Conflicts: American Civil War • Camp Wildcat (1861) • Mill Springs (1862) • Cumberland Gap (1862) • Stones River (1863) • Chickamauga (1863) • Knoxville Campaign (1863)

James Gallant Spears (March 29, 1816 – July 22, 1869) was an American general who served in the Union Army during the Civil War. Leading a unit composed primarily of Tennessee loyalists, he participated in early battles in the Cumberland Gap area before marching with the Army of the Cumberland at Stones River and Chickamauga. He later provided support for the Knoxville Campaign.

An ardent Southern Unionist, Spears was appointed vice president of the 1861 East Tennessee Convention, which sought to form a separate, Union-aligned state in East Tennessee. He opposed the abolition of slavery, however, and was dismissed from the Army in 1864 for speaking out against the Emancipation Proclamation.

== Early life ==
Spears was born in Bledsoe County, Tennessee, the eldest of five children of John Holliday Spears, a doctor, and his wife, Sarah (Gallant) Spears. As a child, his family struggled financially after his father lost much of the family's estate through speculation. Fond of reading, Spears managed to educate himself, and eventually studied law.

In 1848, Spears was elected clerk of the state circuit court. By 1851, he had acquired a large farm and several slaves, located on the outskirts of Pikeville. In 1860, he was among the commissioners appointed by the state to oversee construction of a turnpike connecting Pikeville and Jasper. On the eve of the Civil War, Spears opposed secession. A Democrat, he supported the Northern Democratic candidate Stephen Douglas in the 1860 presidential election.

Spears represented Bledsoe County at both the Knoxville and Greeneville sessions of the 1861 East Tennessee Convention, and was appointed the convention's vice president. Described by fellow delegate Oliver Perry Temple as "hot-headed, impulsive, and obstinate in what he thought was right," Spears supported the convention's original petition, which demanded the state legislature allow East Tennessee to form a separate, Union-aligned state, and threatened to use force if necessary. He was joined in this view by convention president T.A.R. Nelson and volatile ex-Congressman Thomas D. Arnold. This petition was rejected in favor of a less-threatening petition authored by Temple, which called for a new state in East Tennessee, but removed the threat of force.

== Civil War ==
Disappointed with the convention's peaceful final petition, Spears returned to his home in Bledsoe County, planning to take no part in the upcoming war. In the Fall of 1861, however, he learned that the state's Confederate authorities had issued a warrant for his arrest on grounds of disloyalty. Spears managed to flee to Kentucky, where he linked up with Tennessee Unionist refugees. He organized the 1st Tennessee Infantry Regiment, and was given the rank of lieutenant colonel in September 1861. The First Tennessee took part in the Battle of Camp Wildcat in late 1861 and the Battle of Mill Springs in early 1862.

Spears was promoted to brigadier general on March 5, 1862. He was placed in command of the 25th Brigade of the Army of the Ohio. In June 1862, the 25th participated in General George W. Morgan's capture of the Cumberland Gap, a key mountain pass located at the junction of Tennessee, Kentucky and Virginia. In August, Spears led a sortie into Tennessee, and scattered a small Confederate contingent at Wallace's Crossroads (near modern LaFollette). Senator Andrew Johnson had suggested Spears be appointed commander of forces around Cumberland Gap, but Union generals were concerned that the hot-tempered Spears would seek violent retribution against East Tennessee Confederates. General Morgan wrote that Spears had "great energy and courage, but has an idea that war means extermination."

In October 1862, Spears and the 25th Brigade were placed under the newly organized Army of the Cumberland, which was commanded by General William S. Rosecrans. Rosecrans marched south to Nashville before turning eastward in pursuit of Braxton Bragg's Army of Tennessee. In late December, the two armies met at the Battle of Stones River near Murfreesboro. As the two armies fought, Spears guided 303 wagons packed with badly needed provisions over muddy roads from Nashville to the frontline, and afterward helped capture a strategic patch of woods known as the "Round Forest" to aid the Union Army's victory.

By the spring of 1863, a number of officers under Spears had grown tired of his "tyranny and ungentlemanly conduct," and accused him of incompetence. Spears was court-martialed, and his brigade was moved to General Gordon Granger's Reserve Corps and placed under the temporary command of General George Crook. Spears was acquitted, however, and his command was restored. Upon his return to his unit in August, he ruthlessly reasserted his authority, and threatened to arrest any officer who attempted to resign. In September, twenty-seven officers under his command signed a petition to Rosecrans demanding Spears's removal.

At the opening of the Battle of Chickamauga in September 1863, Spears's unit occupied Lookout Mountain, overlooking Chattanooga. He was attacked by a Confederate force led by Nathan B. Forrest, but was ordered by Rosecrans to abandon the mountain rather than risk capture. In December 1863, Spears led his brigade north as part of an expedition to relieve Union-occupied Knoxville, which had been placed under siege by General James Longstreet. Spears scattered a small Confederate contingent led by John R. Hart near Kingston, and captured six guns abandoned by Hart at Loudon.

Spears staunchly opposed President Abraham Lincoln's Emancipation Proclamation, and angrily spoke out against it. He allegedly stated, "God damn the Government; let her go to hell, and I'll be found in the ranks fighting her." He was arrested for these statements in February 1864, and subsequently court-martialed. While Spears admitted he disagreed with the Proclamation, he denied making disloyal statements. He was nevertheless found guilty, and ordered removed from command. He was offered an opportunity to resign his commission, but he refused, and was thus dismissed on August 30, 1864.

== Later life and family ==
After his dismissal, Spears returned to his farm in Bledsoe County, and began rebuilding his fortune. His health, which had suffered during the war, continued to decline. He died at his home on July 22, 1869, and was interred in the Pikeville City Cemetery.

Spears married Adeline Brown in 1849. They had six children. Spears's son, Colonel William D. Spears, was a prominent Chattanooga-area attorney in the late-19th and early-20th centuries. Another son, Napoleon Bonaparte Spears, served in the Tennessee state legislature and the Alabama Legislature, and was a delegate to Alabama's 1901 constitutional convention.

== See also ==
- Samuel P. Carter
- Richard M. Edwards
