= Carter L. Stevenson =

Confederate Army general (1817–1888)

Carter Littlepage Stevenson Jr.
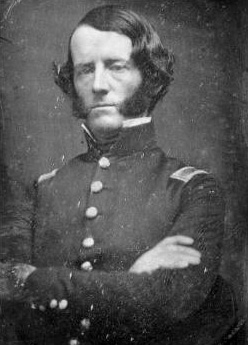
- Born: September 21, 1817; Fredericksburg, Virginia
- Died: August 15, 1888 (aged 70); Caroline County, Virginia
- Burial place: Confederate Cemetery, Fredericksburg, Virginia
- Military career
- Allegiance: United States; Confederate States of America
- Branch: United States Army; Confederate States Army
- Service years: 1838–1861 (U.S.A); 1861–1865 (C.S.A)
- Rank: Captain USA; Major General (CSA)
- Conflicts: Second Seminole War; Mexican–American War -Battle of Palo Alto: Battle of Resaca de la Palma; Third Seminole War; Utah War; American Civil War; Battle of Champion's Hill; Siege of Vicksburg; Atlanta campaign; Battle of Nashville; Carolinas campaign

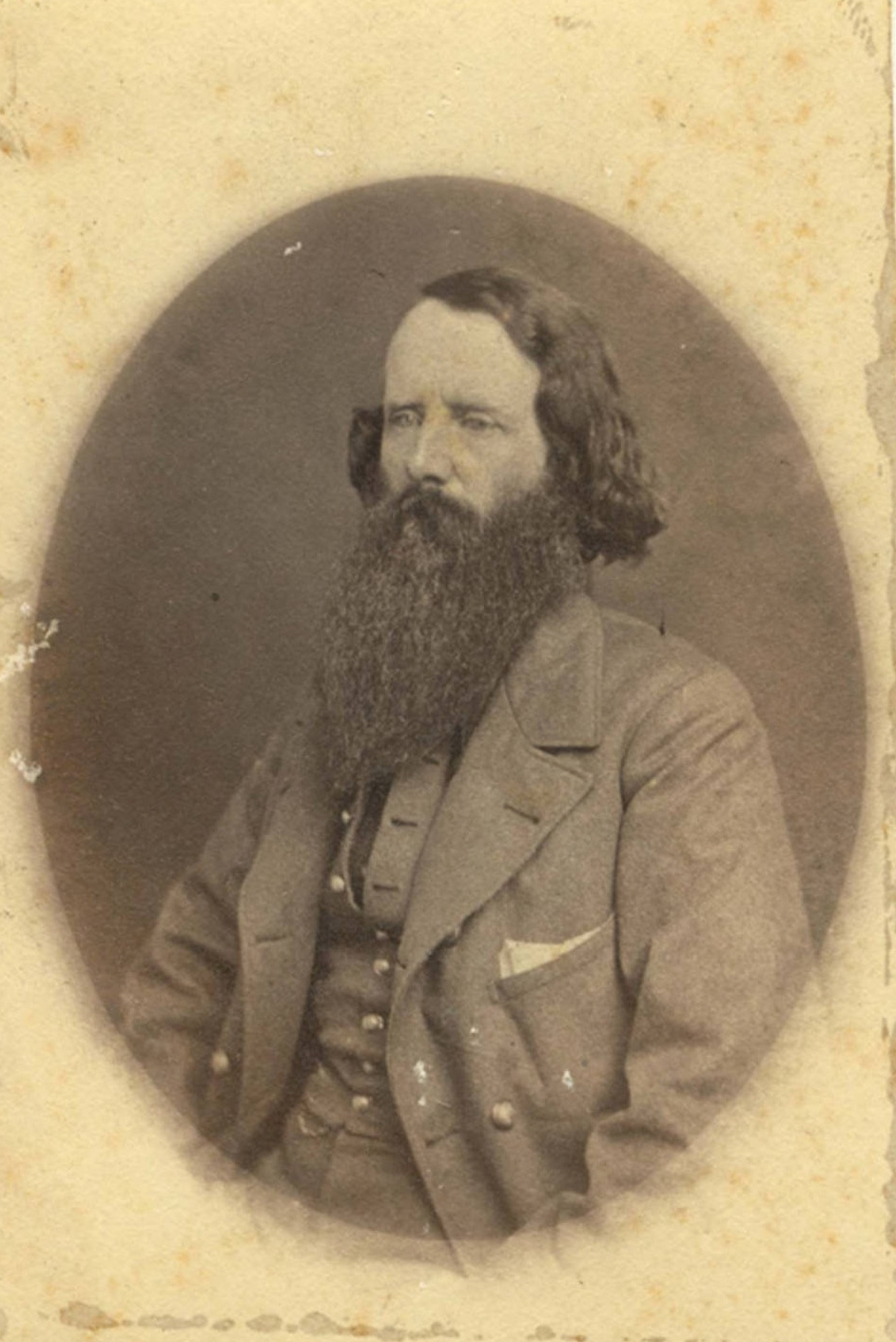
Stevenson in the Civil War

Carter Littlepage Stevenson Jr. (September 21, 1817 – August 15, 1888) was a career military officer, serving in the United States Army in several antebellum wars and then in the Confederate States Army as a general in the Western Theater of the American Civil War.

== Early life and career ==
Stevenson was born to a prominent family in Fredericksburg, Virginia. His father and namesake served as the Commonwealth of Virginia's attorney for Fredericksburg. Carter Stevenson was an 1838 graduate of the United States Military Academy, receiving a commission as a brevet second lieutenant in the 5th Infantry Regiment and assigned to garrison duty in Wisconsin. Two years later, he was promoted to first lieutenant and participated in the Second Seminole War in Florida. He married Martha Silvery Griswold at Fredericksburg on June 15, 1842. They had four children, but their first two died in infancy.

Transferred to Texas, Stevenson served on frontier duty until the Mexican–American War. He fought with distinction in the battles of Palo Alto and Resaca de la Palma, and participated in several other fights before returning to the United States at posts in Mississippi, Indian Territory, and Texas. He helped explore parts of the proposed Southern route for the Pacific railroad, often skirmishing with Apache Indians.

In 1856–57, Stevenson again was in combat in Florida, this time in the Third Seminole War, fighting in the battles of Big Cypress Swamp and Bowleytown. By now a veteran warrior, Stevenson returned to the West and fought in the Utah War. During his stay in the Utah Territory, Stevenson joined Rocky Mountain Lodge #205 of the Freemasons. He later returned to routine garrison duty on the frontier until 1861.

== Civil War ==
Stevenson, as with many other officers from Virginia stationed in the West, returned home when the state seceded from the Union in early 1861. He offered his services to the governor and received a commission as a lieutenant colonel in the Confederate army. He was soon promoted to colonel and given command of the 53rd Virginia Infantry at the recommendation of Pierre G. T. Beauregard. When openings were created with Beauregard's transfer of several officers to serve with him in the Western Theater, Stevenson was promoted to brigadier general in February 1862. On March 15, he reported to General Benjamin Huger and assigned to guard the Wilmington and Weldon Railroad in Virginia. However, this duty was short-lived, as Stevenson was sent to Edmund Kirby Smith's Department of East Tennessee and given command of a division.

Upon arriving in Tennessee, Stevenson's division marched to the Cumberland Gap to reinforce Colonel James Edward Rains but was ordered by Smith to withdraw to a position better suited to aid Chattanooga. This redeployment allowed the Gap to fall into Union hands. In August, Smith's 21-000-man Army of Kentucky spearheaded Braxton Bragg's Confederate Heartland Offensive into the Bluegrass State. Smith bypassed Union-held Cumberland Gap, leaving Stevenson's division behind to deal with the Federals there. While Smith's force moved north to the Battle of Richmond, Stevenson remained covering the Federals at Cumberland Gap. This, coupled with the approach of Bragg's force, compelled Gen. George W. Morgan's withdrawal. Stevenson missed the Battle of Perryville and re-joined Smith on the Confederates' withdrawal back into Tennessee. Recognized again for his leadership ability, he was promoted to major general in October 1862.

In December, Braxton Bragg sent Stevenson with 10,000 men to reinforce John C. Pemberton's force at Vicksburg, Mississippi, which was threatened by a Union army under Ulysses S. Grant. The loss of Stevenson's men was sorely felt by Bragg in his upcoming battle at Stones River. Stevenson arrived in Vicksburg on December 29, 1862, and assumed command from Stephen D. Lee, defending the Walnut Hills area, north of the city.

In spring of 1863, Stevenson's division was a portion of the army that Pemberton moved east, after Grant had crossed the Mississippi River and was moving to surround Vicksburg. Stevenson's division bore the brunt of fighting at Pemberton's loss at the Battle of Champion Hill. There, the main Federal assault (nearly 25,000 troops) was against Stevenson's line, held by barely 6,500 men. After stubborn resistance, Stevenson finally withdrew when his lines began breaking. When Pemberton's force was defeated at the Battle of Big Black River Bridge, Stevenson (whose men had seen no significant action in the battle) commanded the retreating columns while General Pemberton hastened to Vicksburg to prepare the defenses of the city. During the Siege of Vicksburg, Stevenson commanded the right of the entire Confederate defensive line. When Pemberton surrendered the army on July 4, 1863, Stevenson briefly became a prisoner of war before receiving a parole.

On his return that fall, Stevenson reported to Bragg's Army of Tennessee at Chattanooga, Tennessee, where Bragg assigned Stevenson overall command of the Confederate left flank atop Lookout Mountain. During the Battles for Chattanooga, Stevenson and Benjamin Cheatham's men were ultimately unable to stave off Joseph Hooker's attacks on the mountain. At day's end, Stevenson decided to withdraw his force from the mountain, their movements screened by the darkness of a lunar eclipse. His men joined the left of John C. Breckinridge's wing just before the Battle of Missionary Ridge. Bragg retreated to Dalton, Georgia, effectively ending the campaign, and offered his resignation. President Davis replaced Bragg with Joseph E. Johnston.

During the 1864 Atlanta campaign, Stevenson's division was positioned in the Crow Valley during the Battle of Rocky Face Ridge. It was assigned to John Bell Hood's corps and fought at Resaca; New Hope Church; Kolb's Farm; Kennesaw Mountain; and the Battle of Atlanta. When General Hood was elevated to command of the army, Stevenson temporarily assumed command of Hood's corps, until replaced by Cheatham.

During the Tennessee Campaign, Stevenson commanded a division in Stephen D. Lee's corps in the center of the line at the Battle of Nashville. When Lee was wounded, he took charge of organizing and leading the retreat. His division had suffered enormous casualties and had been unable to recruit significant numbers of replacements. Down to approximately 2,600 men, the depleted division participated in the Carolinas campaign against William T. Sherman, making stands at Columbia; and Battle of Bentonville. For the second time in the war, Stevenson surrendered to the Federals when Joseph E. Johnston surrendered his army 26 April 1865 at Bennett Place, NC to W.T.Sherman. Stevenson again was paroled and sent home.

== Postbellum activities ==
After the war, he was occupied as a civil and mining engineer until his death in Caroline County, Virginia. He was buried in the Confederate Cemetery in Fredericksburg.

In 1914, Maj. Gen. Carter L. Stevenson was commemorated with a marble bust at the Vicksburg National Military Park.

== See also ==
- List of American Civil War generals (Confederate)
