= 1st Tennessee Infantry Regiment (Union) =

- Active: August 1861 to August 8, 1865
- Country: United States
- Allegiance: Union
- Branch: Union Army
- Type: Infantry, Mounted infantry
- Size: Regiment
- Engagements: American Civil War: Battle of Mill Springs (1862); Sanders' Knoxville Raid (1863); Battle of Mossy Creek (1863); Atlanta campaign (1864); Battle of Resaca (1864); Battle of Kennesaw Mountain (1864); Siege of Atlanta (1864)

Commanders
- Notable commanders: Col. Robert K. Byrd; Lt. Col. James G. Spears (later Brig. Gen.)

The 1st Tennessee Infantry Regiment was an infantry regiment that served in the Union Army during the American Civil War. Recruited from Tennessee Unionists, the regiment was organized in August 1861 and fought at Mill Springs in January 1862. The unit served in Sanders' Knoxville Raid, at Bean's Station, and Mossy Creek in 1863 as a mounted infantry unit. The regiment was dismounted and fought in the Atlanta campaign until it was withdrawn in August 1864. Subsequently, it performed garrison duty in East Tennessee until August 1865.

== Service ==
The 1st Tennessee Infantry was organized at Camp Dick Robinson in Garrard County, Kentucky August through September 1861 and mustered in for a three-year enlistment.

The regiment was attached to Thomas' Command, Army of the Ohio, to November 1861. 12th Brigade, Army of the Ohio, to December 1861. 12th Brigade, 1st Division, Army of the Ohio, to February 1862. 24th Brigade. 7th Division, Army of the Ohio, to October 1862. 3rd Brigade, District of West Virginia, Department of the Ohio, to November 1862. 1st Brigade, 2nd Division, Center, XIV Corps, Army of the Cumberland, to January 1863. 1st Brigade, 2nd Division, XIV Corps, to April 1863. District of Central Kentucky, Department of the Ohio, to June 1863. 1st Brigade, 1st Division, XXIII Corps, Army of the Ohio, to August 1863. 1st Brigade, 4th Division, XXIII Corps, to October 1863. 2nd Brigade, 4th Division, XXIII Corps, to November 1863. 2nd Brigade, 1st Division, Cavalry Corps, Department of the Ohio, to April 1864. 3rd Brigade, 4th Division, XXIII Corps, to May 1864. 3rd Brigade, 3rd Division, XXIII Corps, to August 1864. 2nd Brigade, 4th Division, XXIII Corps, to February 1865. 2nd Brigade, 4th Division, District of East Tennessee, to August 1865.

The 1st Tennessee Infantry mustered out of service on August 8, 1865.

== Detailed service ==
Duty at Camp Dick Robinson and at London, Ky., until January 1862. Battle of Logan's Cross Roads January 19, 1862. At London and covering Cumberland Gap until March. Skirmishes at Big Creek Gap and at Jacksboro March 14 (Company A). Reconnaissance to Cumberland Gap and skirmishes March 21–23. Cumberland Gap Campaign March 28-June 18. Occupation of Cumberland Gap June 18-September 17. Skirmish near Cumberland Gap August 27. Rogers' Gap August 31. Operations at Rogers' and Big Creek Gaps September 10. Evacuation of Cumberland Gap and retreat to Greenupsburg, Ky., September 17-October 3. Operations at Kanawha Valley, W. Va., until November. Ordered to Louisville, Ky., thence to Nashville, Tenn., and duty there until January 1863. Escort trains to Murfreesboro, Tenn., January 2–3. Action at Cox's or Blood's Hill January 3, 1863. Reconnaissance to Franklin and Brentwood February 1–2. Ordered to Lexington, Ky., March 11, 1863. Duty in District of Central Kentucky tell June. At Camp Dick Robinson until April. Expedition to Monticello and operations in southeast Kentucky April 25-May 2. At Nicholasville May. Actions at Monticello and Rocky Gap June 9. Sanders' Raid on East Tennessee & Virginia Railroad and destruction of Slate Creek, Strawberry Plains and Mossy Creek bridges June 14–24. Kingston June 16. Wartzburg June 17. Lenoir Station. June 19. Knoxville June 19–20. Rogers' Gap June 20. Powder Springs Gap June 21. Powell Valley June 22. Pursuit of Morgan July 3–23. At Lebanon and Camp Nelson July. Operations against Scott's forces in eastern Kentucky July 25-August 6. Near Winchester July 29. Irvine July 30. Lancaster, Stanford and Pain's Lick Bridge July 31. Smith's Shoals, Cumberland River, August 1. Burnside's Campaign in eastern Tennessee August 16-October 19. Jacksborough August 28. Winter's Gap August 31. Athens September 10 and 25. Calhoun September 18. Calhoun and Charleston September 25. Cleveland October 9. Philadelphia October 20–22. Sweetwater October 24. Leiper's Ferry October 28. Knoxville Campaign November 4-December 23. Marysville November 14. Lenoir Station November 14–15. Near Loudoun and Holston River November 15. Campbell's Station November 16. Siege of Knoxville November 17-December 5. Russellville December 10. At and near Bean's Station December 9–15. Blain's Cross Roads December 16–19. Hay's Ferry, near Dandridge, December 24. Mossy Creek, Talbot Station, December 29. Bend of Chucky and Rutledge January 16, 1864. Operations about Dandridge January 16–17. Seviersville January 26. Near Fair Garden January 27. Fentress County February 13. Sulphur Springs February 26. Atlanta Campaign May to August. Demonstration on Dalton May 8–11. Battle of Resaca May 14–15. Cartersville May 20. Operations on line of Pumpkin Vine Creek and battles about Dallas, New Hope Church and Allatoona Hills May 25-June 5. Operations about Marietta and against Kennesaw Mountain June 10-July 2. Lost Mountain June 15–17. Muddy Creek June 17. Noyes Creek June 19. Cheyney's Farm June 22. Olley's Creek June 26–27. Assault on Kennesaw June 27. Nickajack Creek July 2–5. Chattahoochie River July 6–17. Peachtree Creek July 19–20. Siege of Atlanta July 22-August 11. Relieved August 11 and ordered to Knoxville, Tenn. Duty there and in eastern Tennessee until March 1865. Expedition from Irish Bottom to Evans' Island January 25, 1865. Ordered to Cumberland Gap March 16, 1865, and duty there until August.

== Casualties ==
The regiment lost a total of 385 men during service; 49 enlisted men killed or mortally wounded, 2 officers and 334 enlisted men died of accident or disease.

== Commanders ==
- Colonel Robert K. Byrd

== See also ==
- List of Tennessee Civil War units
- Tennessee in the Civil War
