= George W. Morgan =

American politician (1820–1893)

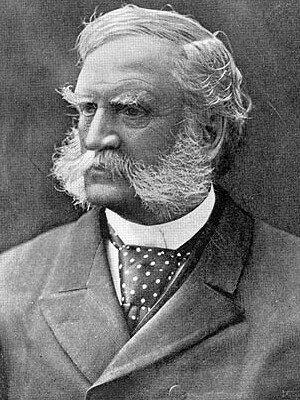
- George W. Morgan, 1892

Member of the U.S. House of Representatives from Ohio's 13th district
- In office March 4, 1867 – June 3, 1868
- Preceded by: Columbus Delano
- Succeeded by: Columbus Delano
- In office March 4, 1869 – March 3, 1873
- Preceded by: Columbus Delano
- Succeeded by: Milton I. Southard

United States Ambassador to Portugal
- In office 1858–1861
- President: James Buchanan
- Preceded by: John L. O'Sullivan
- Succeeded by: James E. Harvey

Personal details
- Born: George Washington Morgan; September 20, 1820 Washington County, Pennsylvania, U.S.
- Died: July 26, 1893 (aged 72) Fort Monroe, Virginia, U.S.
- Resting place: Mound View Cemetery, Mount Vernon, Ohio
- Party: Democratic
- Spouse: Sarah H. Hall
- Children: two
- Education: Washington & Jefferson College

Military service
- Allegiance: United States of America; Union
- Branch/service: United States Army; Union Army
- Years of service: 1846–1848, 1861–1863
- Rank: Brigadier General
- Commands: 15th Infantry Regiment
- Battles/wars: Mexican War: Battle of Contreras; Battle of Churubusco; Battle of Chapultepec; American Civil War: Battle of the Cumberland Gap; Battle of Chickasaw Bayou; Battle of Arkansas Post

George Washington Morgan (September 20, 1820 – July 26, 1893) was an American soldier, lawyer, politician, and diplomat. He fought in the Texas Revolution and the Mexican–American War, and was a general in the Union Army during the American Civil War. Morgan later served as a three-term reconstruction era United States Congressman from Ohio. He also served as the United States Ambassador to Portugal from 1858 to 1861, during the term of President James Buchanan.

== Early life and career ==
Morgan was born in Washington County, Pennsylvania, to a prominent family. His grandfather, Col. George Morgan, was the first to give President Thomas Jefferson the information regarding Aaron Burr's conspiracy. G. W. Morgan was educated in local schools, and then in 1836, he withdrew from Washington College at the age of 16 and enlisted in a military company that was commanded by his older brother, Thomas Jefferson Morgan. They traveled south to Mexican Texas to fight in the struggle for independence from Mexico. Morgan received a commission in the regular Texas Army under Sam Houston as a lieutenant, and rose to captain commanding the post at Galveston. He served with Captain Robertson's rangers and Company B of the First Regiment of Texas Rangers. He resigned in 1839 to return to Pennsylvania.

In 1841, he entered the United States Military Academy, but left in 1843 due to poor grades. He moved to Mount Vernon, Ohio, studied law, passed the bar exam, and established a law practice there in 1845. He served as prosecutor for Knox County.

When war erupted with Mexico, Morgan was appointed Colonel of the 2nd Ohio Volunteer Infantry. He subsequently was commissioned as Colonel of the 15th U.S. Infantry in March 1847, serving under General Winfield Scott. To put an end to the guerrilla warfare and murder of American soldiers, Colonel Morgan seized a number of prominent Mexican citizens and issued a proclamation announcing that for every American soldier killed by the guerrillas, a citizen would be executed. The murders ceased at once. He was breveted to brigadier general in 1848 for his gallantry at the battles of Contreras and Churubusco, where he was severely wounded. Returning to Ohio to recuperate, he received the formal thanks of the Ohio legislature.

Morgan resumed his law practice in Mount Vernon. He married Sarah H. Hall of Zanesville, Ohio, on October 7, 1851, and they had two children.

He was a lawyer until 1856, when he was appointed by President James Buchanan as the United States Consul to Marseille. Two years later, he became the Minister to Portugal, which post he held until 1861, when he returned to the United States following the outbreak of the Civil War.

== Civil War ==
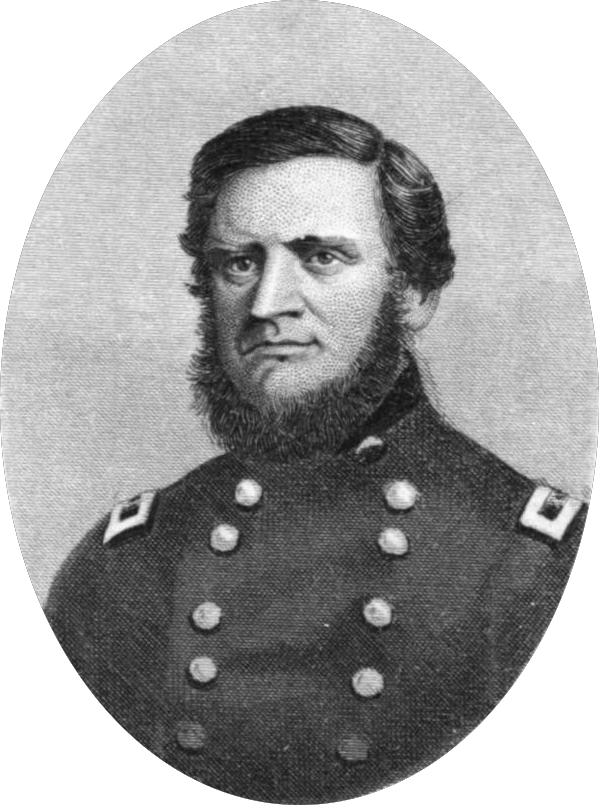
Morgan during the Civil War

Morgan, due to his previous military experience in two wars, was appointed as a brigadier general in the Union Army on November 21, 1861, reporting to Maj. Gen. Don Carlos Buell in the Western Theater. In March 1862, Morgan assumed command of the 7th Division of the Army of the Ohio and was ordered to southeastern Kentucky to drive the Confederates from the strategic Cumberland Gap and occupy it. Moving quickly, Morgan defeated Carter L. Stevenson's Confederates and chased off the defenders on June 18, 1862. He then successfully manned the gap with his four brigades of infantry, augmented by artillery placed on the heights.

However, in September, he was forced to hastily retreat towards the Ohio River as Braxton Bragg invaded Kentucky, cutting off his supply routes. Morgan conducted a masterful retreat in the face of the much superior enemy force, despite being harassed by constant attacks from Col. John H. Morgan's guerrillas. George Morgan's 8,000 men marched over 200 miles from Cumberland Gap in sixteen days to Greenup, Kentucky, arriving there on October 3 on their way to Camp Dennison in Ohio.

In November, Morgan served with Maj. Gen. Jacob D. Cox in western Virginia (now West Virginia) in the Kanawha River Valley, defending Charleston.

The following year, Morgan commanded the 3rd Division of the XIII Corps under Maj. Gen. William T. Sherman during the Vicksburg Campaign. Sherman, however, was upset with Morgan's performance at the battle of Chickasaw Bluffs, when he failed to carry out orders for a planned attack. Morgan soon redeemed himself as he subsequently led the XIII Corps force that captured Fort Hindman in Arkansas. His health having deteriorated from the lengthy campaigning, and dissatisfied with the use of black troops, Morgan resigned his commission on June 8, 1863, and returned to Ohio and civilian life.

== Later life and political career ==
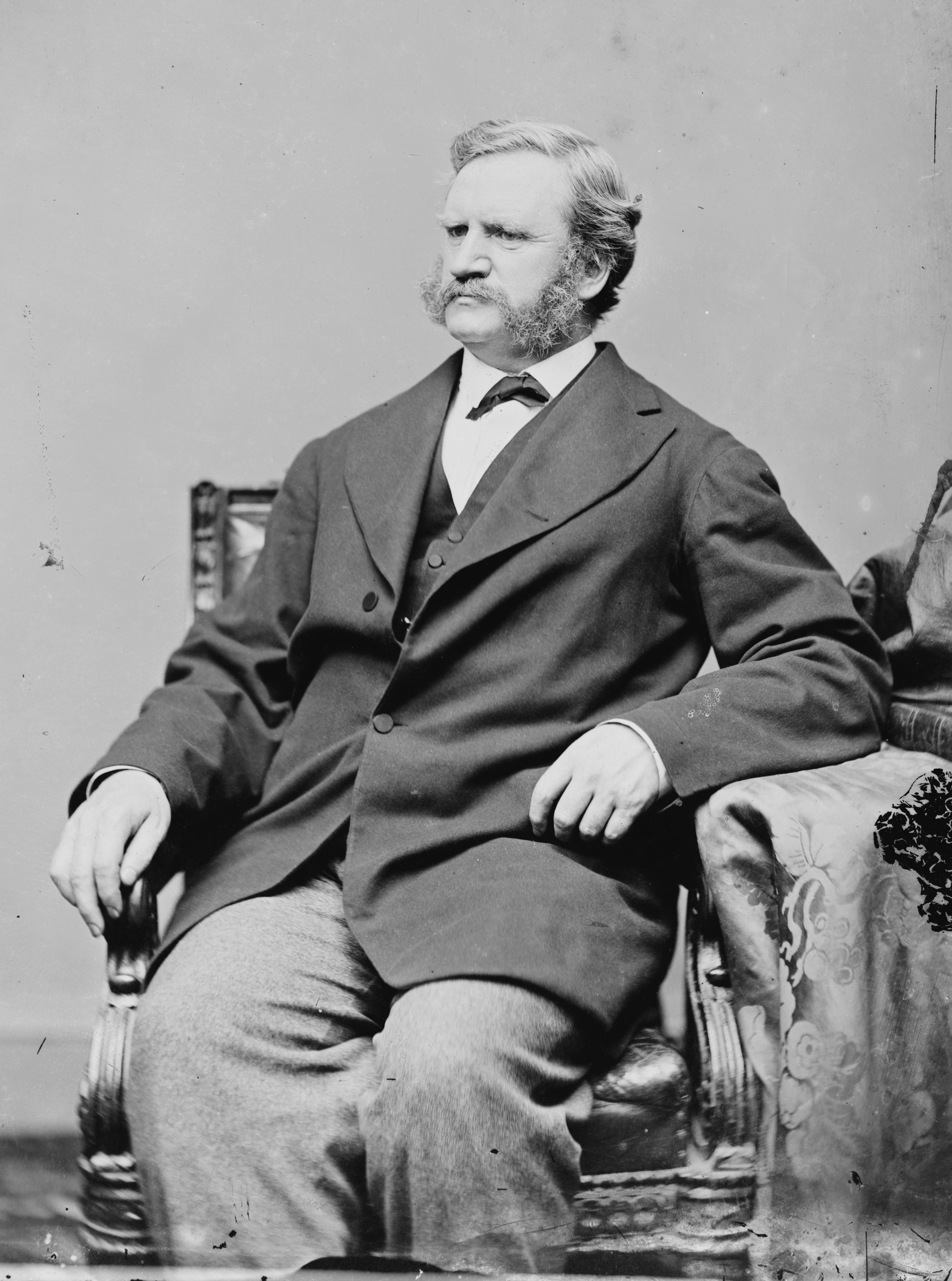
George Washington Morgan

While strongly in favor of maintaining the Union at any cost, Morgan was equally opposed to any interference with slavery, believing that the Federal government had no legal right to abolish the practice. Morgan campaigned in Ohio for former army general George B. McClellan in the 1864 Presidential Election. In 1865 he was the unsuccessful Democratic candidate for Governor of Ohio, being defeated by his former commander in the Kanawha Valley, Jacob D. Cox.

Nonetheless, he continued to pursue a political career, and in 1866 was elected to the Fortieth United States Congress from Ohio's 13th District, serving on the Committee on Foreign Affairs. There, he voted against the impeachment of President Andrew Johnson. Two years later, he appeared to have won reelection. However, his seat was contested by the defeated Republican candidate, Columbus Delano, who supplanted him on June 3, 1868. Not deterred, Morgan campaigned again in 1870 and was elected to another term, holding his Congressional seat until 1873, serving on the committees on foreign affairs, military affairs, and reconstruction. He was an outspoken critic of the administration's harsh policies on reconstruction and constantly battled with the Radical Republicans. Morgan ran for Speaker of the United States House of Representatives, but was defeated by James G. Blaine.

== Retirement ==
Following his retirement from Congress, Morgan was a delegate-at-large to the 1876 Democratic National Convention in St. Louis.

== Death and burial ==
Morgan died at Fort Monroe, Virginia on July 26, 1893, the last surviving general of the Mexican-American War. He was buried in Mound View Cemetery in Mount Vernon, Ohio.

== See also ==
- List of American Civil War generals (Union)
- List of Ohio's American Civil War generals

U.S. House of Representatives
| Preceded by Columbus Delano | Member of the U.S. House of Representatives from Ohio's 13th congressional district June 3, 1867 – March 3, 1868 | Succeeded by Columbus Delano |
| Preceded by Columbus Delano | Member of the U.S. House of Representatives from Ohio's 13th congressional district March 4, 1869 – March 3, 1873 | Succeeded by Milton I. Southard |
Diplomatic posts
| Preceded by John L. O'Sullivan | United States Ambassador to Portugal; 1858–1861 | Succeeded by James E. Harvey |
Party political offices
| Preceded by Clement Vallandigham | Democratic Party nominee for Governor of Ohio; 1865 | Succeeded by Allen G. Thurman |
