= List of Southern Unionists =

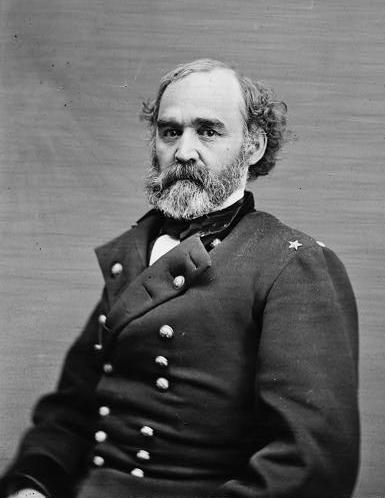
Montgomery C. Meigs (Georgia) was Quartermaster General of the U.S. Army during and after the war, and his ability to keep the Army supplied proved instrumental in ensuring victory.

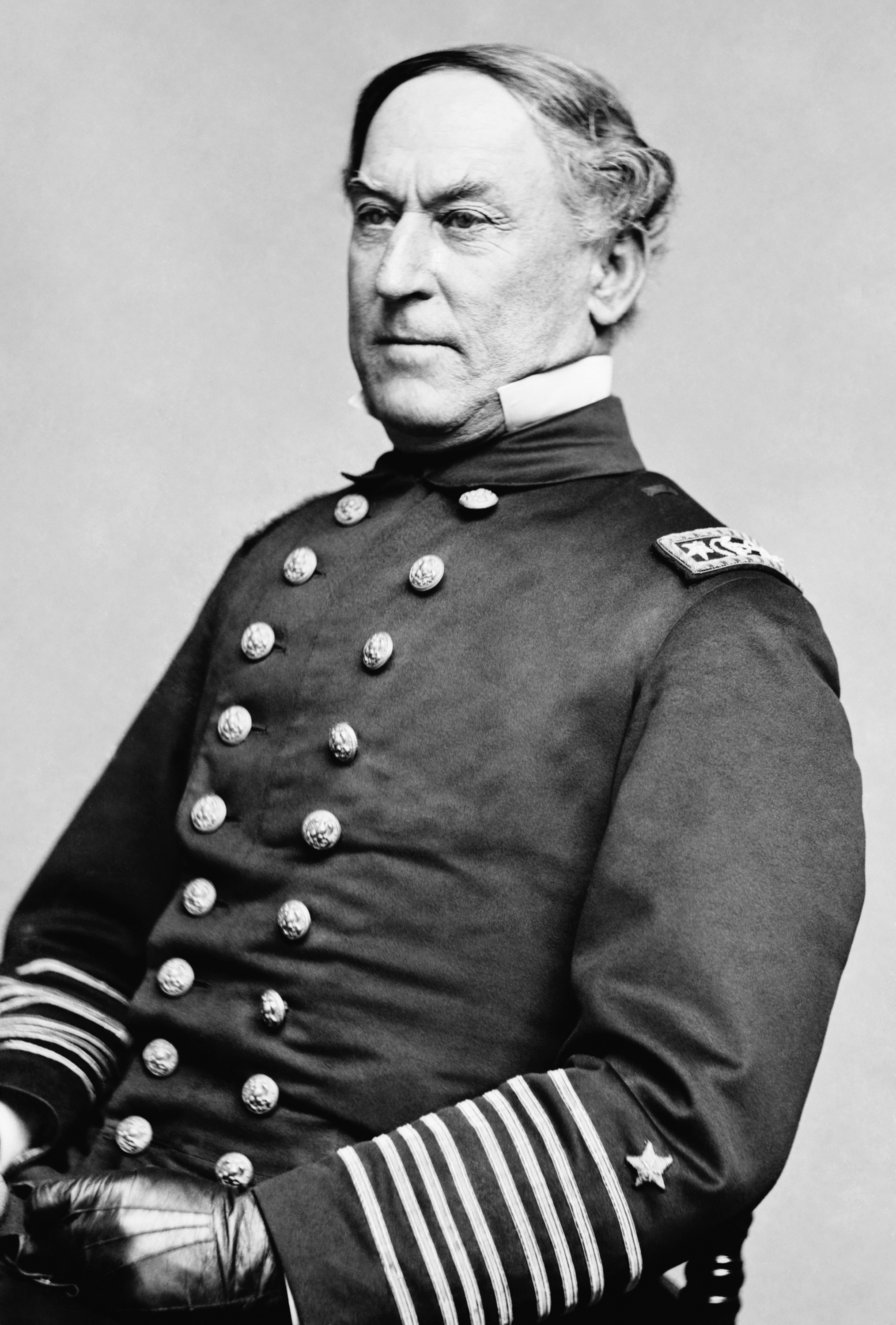
David Farragut (Tennessee) was made rear admiral in the Union Navy after capturing New Orleans in the spring of 1862.

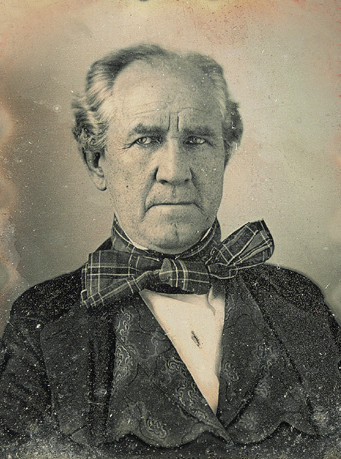
Sam Houston (Texas), erstwhile President of the Republic of Texas, was governor of Texas during the secession crisis of 1860-1861 and unsuccessfully tried to prevent Texas from seceding.

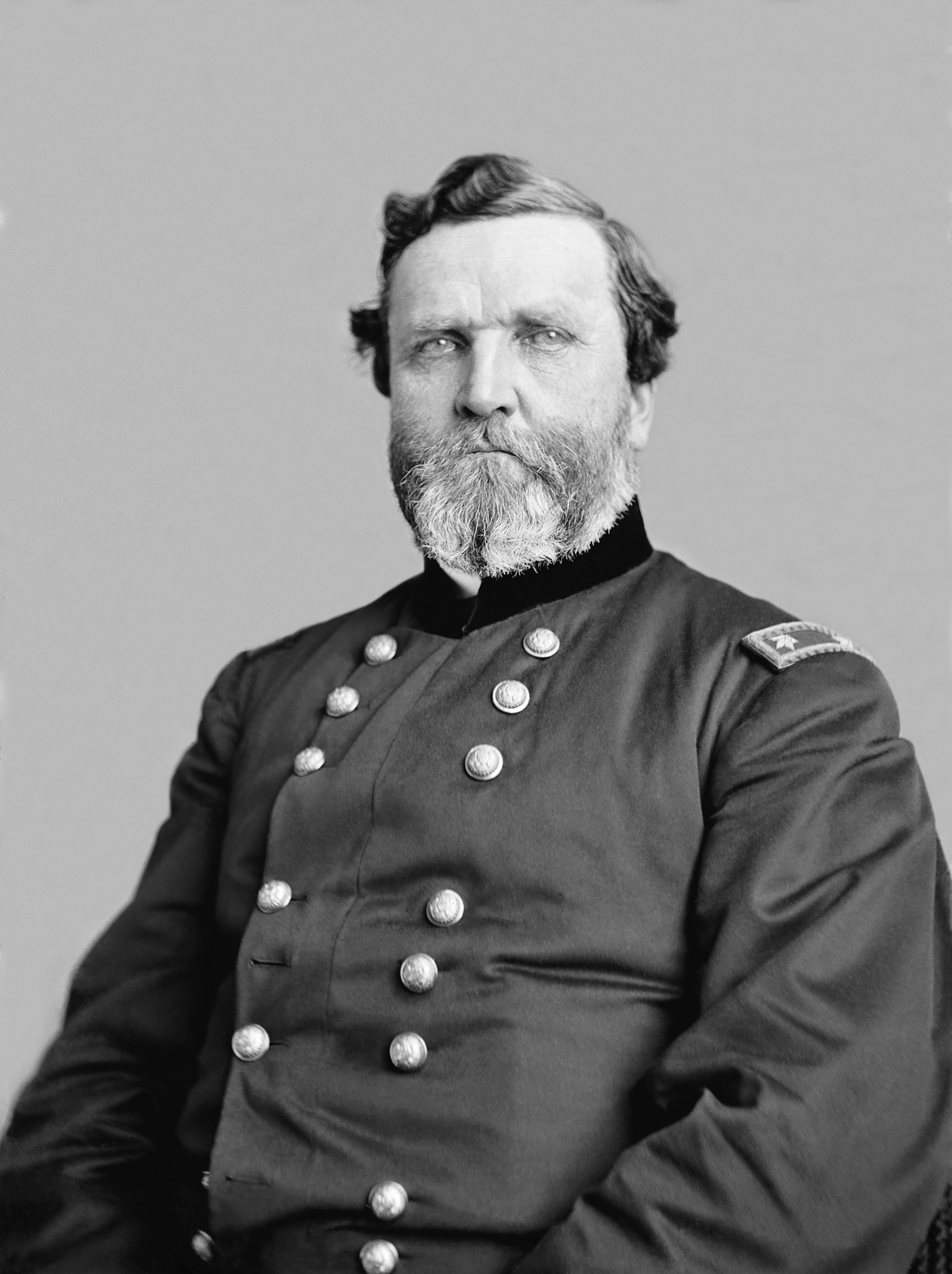
George H. Thomas (Virginia) of the Union Army was one of the most important generals of the conflict, playing a crucial role in Western Theater.

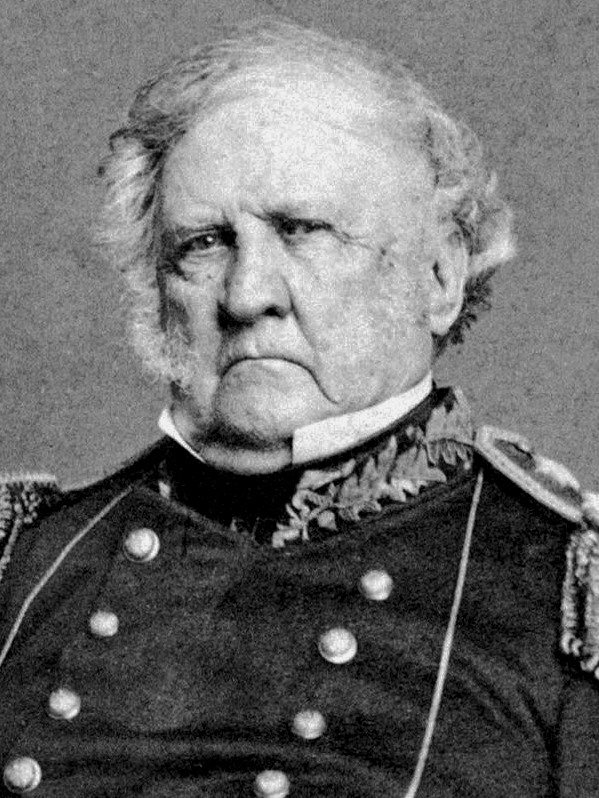
Winfield Scott (Virginia), general-in-chief of the Union Army, was a military advisor to Abraham Lincoln, and developed the Anaconda Plan to cut the Confederacy in half.

In the United States, Southern Unionists were white Southerners living in the Confederate States of America and the Southern Border States opposed to secession. Many fought for the Union during the Civil War. These people are also referred to as Southern Loyalists, Union Loyalists, (Note: "Hart was one of the first native white Union Loyalists to speak out in favor of black suffrage and equal rights.") or Lincoln's Loyalists. Pro-Confederates in the South derided them as "Tories" (in reference to the pro-Crown Loyalists of the American Revolution). During Reconstruction, these terms were replaced by "scalawag" (or "scallywag"), which covered all Southern whites who supported the Republican Party.

== Alabama ==
- George Washington Lane
- Joseph G. Sanders
- William Hugh Smith

== Arkansas ==
- Thomas Boles
- William Meade Fishback
- Lafayette Gregg
- James M. Johnson
- Isaac Murphy

== Florida ==
- Richard K. Call
- Ossian Bingley Hart
- David B. Macomb

== Georgia ==
- George W. Ashburn
- Foster Blodgett
- John M. Cuyler
- Joshua Hill
- Montgomery C. Meigs
- James M. Wayne

== Kentucky ==
(Note: Kentucky's legislature voted not to secede and declared neutrality, but after Confederate troops moved in, the state legislature asked for Union troops to drive them out. Delegates from 68 of the 110 Kentucky counties went to the Russellville Convention that signed an Ordinance of Secession. Kentucky was admitted into the Confederacy on December 10, 1861, with Bowling Green as its first capital. Early in the war, the Confederacy controlled more than half of Kentucky but largely lost control in 1862. The splinter Confederate government of Kentucky left the state and never controlled the state population after 1862. By the end of the war, 90,000 Kentuckians had fought for the Union, compared to 35,000 for the Confederacy.)

- George Madison Adams
- Robert Anderson
- Francis Preston Blair Jr.
- Thomas E. Bramlette
- Joseph Cabell Breckinridge Sr.
- Robert Jefferson Breckinridge
- Samuel L. Casey
- Cassius Clay
- John J. Crittenden
- Thomas Leonidas Crittenden
- Garrett Davis
- George W. Dunlap
- Henry Grider
- Aaron Harding
- John Marshall Harlan
- Joseph Holt
- James S. Jackson
- Robert Mallory
- John W. Menzies
- James Speed
- Joshua Fry Speed
- William H. Wadsworth

== Louisiana ==
- W. Jasper Blackburn
- John Edward Bouligny
- Benjamin Flanders
- Michael Hahn
- Theodore G. Hunt
- Philip H. Morgan
- James Madison Wells

== Mississippi ==
- Stephen Duncan
- Newton Knight
- Greenwood LeFlore
- William L. Sharkey

== North Carolina ==
- Elisha Baxter
- John Baxter
- Henry H. Bell
- John Gibbon
- William Woods Holden
- Alexander H. Jones
- George Washington Kirk
- Alexander McRae
- John Pool
- Fabius Stanly
- William Brickly Stokes
- John A. Winslow

== South Carolina ==
- Percival Drayton
- Francis Lieber
- James L. Petigru

== Tennessee ==
- Samuel Mayes Arnell
- George Washington Bridges
- James Patton Brownlow
- John Bell Brownlow
- William Gannaway Brownlow
- Roderick R. Butler
- Alfred Cate
- James P. T. Carter
- Samuel P. Carter
- William B. Carter
- Andrew Jackson Clements
- William Crutchfield
- Emerson Etheridge
- David Farragut
- Fielding Hurst
- Andrew Johnson
- George Washington Kirk
- Gaines Lawson
- Horace Maynard
- William McFarland
- James Mullins
- Thomas Amos Rogers Nelson
- James G. Spears
- Nathaniel Green Taylor
- Oliver Perry Temple
- Jacob Montgomery Thornburgh
- Daniel C. Trewhitt
- John Trimble
- William H. Wisener

== Texas ==
- Edmund J. Davis
- Edward Degener
- Thomas H. DuVal
- Lemuel D. Evans
- J. W. Flanagan
- Andrew Jackson Hamilton
- Morgan C. Hamilton
- John Hancock
- John L. Haynes
- Sam Houston
- Elisha M. Pease

== Virginia ==
- John Minor Botts
- Lemuel J. Bowden
- John S. Carlile
- Philip St. George Cooke
- Samuel Phillips Lee
- Ebenezer E. Mason
- Samuel C. Means
- Lewis McKenzie
- Winfield Scott
- Joseph Segar
- Franklin Stearns
- William Terrill
- George Henry Thomas
- Charles H. Upton
- Elizabeth Van Lew

== West Virginia ==
- Jacob B. Blair
- Arthur I. Boreman (Note: "Unconditional Unionists, such as Arthur I. Boreman, Archibald W. Campbell, Waitman T. Willey, and Chester D. Hubbard, were ready to accept emancipation of slaves, imposed by Congress, and wartime proscriptions, including suspension of habeas corpus, of the Lincoln administration in return for statehood. Conservative Unionists, including John S. Carlile, Sherrard Clemens, John J. Jackson, and John J. Davis, would jeopardize statehood rather than bow to a government that they perceived as dictatorial and abolitionist.")
- William G. Brown Sr.
- Sherrard Clemens
- John J. Davis
- Chester D. Hubbard
- Francis Harrison Pierpont
- Kellian Whaley
- Waitman T. Willey
