= East Tennessee bridge burnings =

Guerrilla operations during the American Civil War

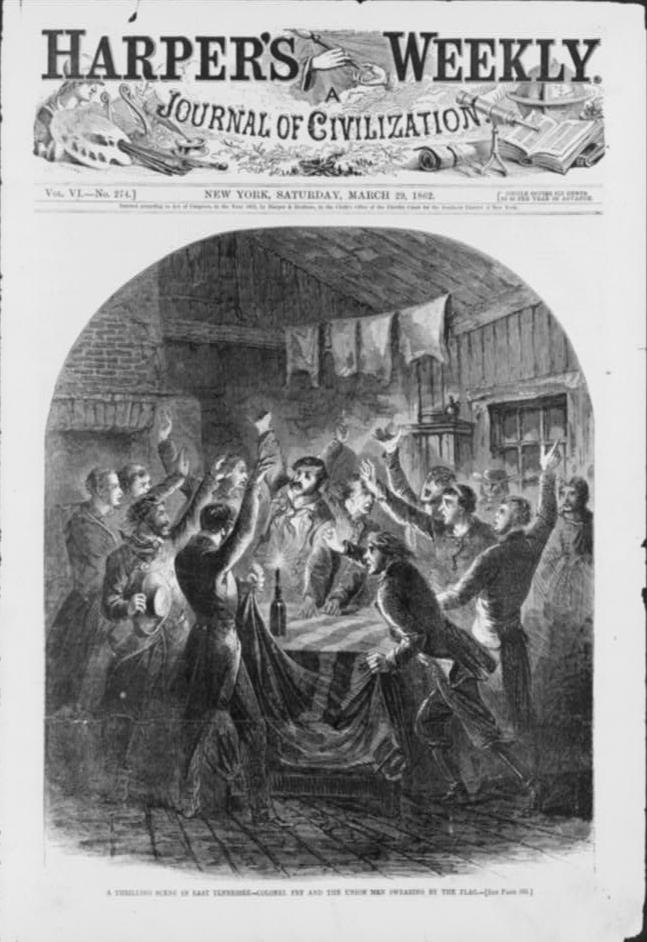
Cover of Harper's Weekly, showing the bridge-burning conspirators swearing allegiance to the American flag

The East Tennessee bridge burnings was a series of guerrilla operations carried out during the American Civil War by Southern Unionists in Confederate-held East Tennessee in 1861. The operations, planned by Carter County minister William B. Carter and authorized by President Abraham Lincoln, called for the destruction of nine strategic railroad bridges, followed by an invasion of the area by Union Army forces stationed in southeastern Kentucky. The conspirators managed to destroy five of the nine targeted bridges, but the Union Army failed to move; the army did not invade East Tennessee until 1863, nearly two years after the incident.

The destruction of the bridges, all of which were quickly rebuilt, had almost no military impact. However, the attacks caused a shift in the way the Confederate authorities regarded East Tennessee's Union sympathizers. Parts of the area were placed under martial law, and dozens of known Unionists were arrested and jailed. Several suspected bridge burners were tried and convicted, being sentenced to death. This in turn brought increased pressure on Lincoln to send Union troops to occupy East Tennessee.

A pro-Union newspaper publisher, William G. "Parson" Brownlow, used the arrests and hangings as propaganda in his 1862 anti-secession diatribe, Sketches of the Rise, Progress and Decline of Secession.

== Background ==
As secessionist sentiment raged through the South in late 1860 and early 1861, a majority of East Tennesseans, like many in the Appalachian highlands, stubbornly remained loyal to the Union. Slavery was not very important to the East Tennessee economy, and the region had been at odds with the state government for decades over a lack of state appropriations for internal improvements. Furthermore, the Whig Party and its successors dominated large parts of East Tennessee, and its adherents viewed with suspicion the actions of the predominantly-Democratic Southern legislatures.

Tennessee as a whole voted to secede from the Union in a referendum held on June 8, 1861, but nearly two-thirds of East Tennesseans rejected the referendum and remained sympathetic to the Union. At the Greeneville session (June 17–20) of the East Tennessee Convention, the region's Unionist leaders condemned secession and petitioned the Tennessee General Assembly to allow East Tennessee to become a separate state and remain in the Union. The legislature rejected the petition, and Governor Isham G. Harris ordered Confederate forces under General Felix Zollicoffer into East Tennessee.

== Planning ==
=== Camp Dick Robinson ===
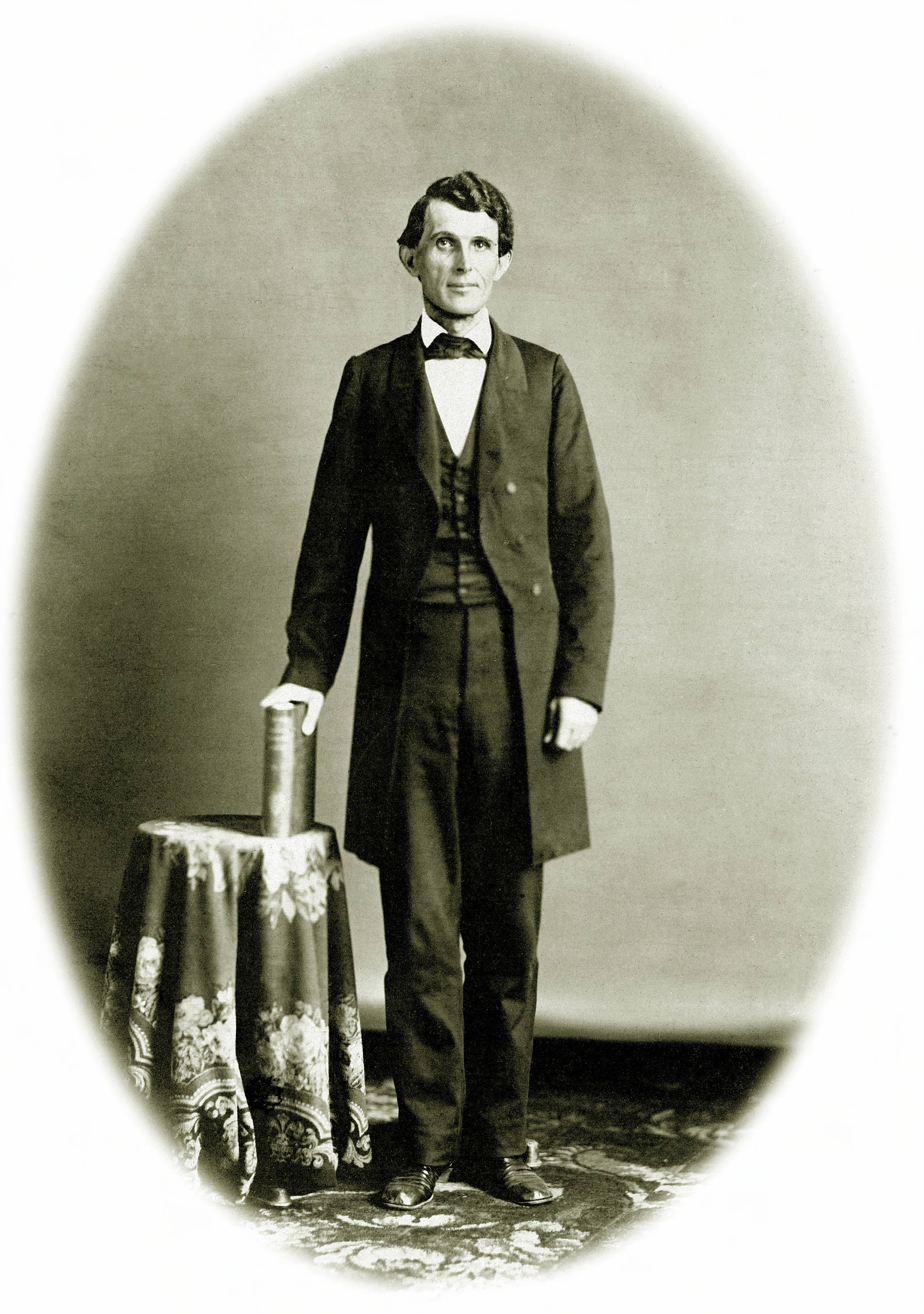
Rev. Carter photographed c. 1850

The East Tennessee and Georgia (ET&G) and East Tennessee and Virginia (ET&V) railroads were vital to the Confederacy since they provided a connection between Virginia and the Deep South that did not require going around the bulk of the southern Appalachian Mountains. Both Union and Confederate leaders realized the railroads' importance. In July 1861, Confederate politician and East Tennessee native Landon Carter Haynes warned of the railroads' vulnerability, stating that at any moment he was "looking to hear that the bridges have been burned and the East Tennessee and Virginia Railroad torn up."

Shortly after the General Assembly rejected the Greeneville petition, Reverend William Blount Carter, a delegate of the Greeneville session, travelled to Camp Dick Robinson in Kentucky, where many of East Tennessee's Unionists had fled to enlist in the Union Army. He met with generals George H. Thomas and William T. Sherman, and his brother, Samuel P. Carter, a U.S. Navy officer who had been appointed a general in the Union Army. William Carter revealed his plan to destroy the region's main railroad bridges to pave the way for a Union invasion. Thomas liked the plan, and although Sherman was initially skeptical, he agreed after a short discussion.

Carrying a letter from Thomas, Carter travelled to Washington, D.C., to meet with President Abraham Lincoln, Commanding General George B. McClellan, and Secretary of State William H. Seward. Lincoln, under immense pressure from Senator Andrew Johnson and Congressman Horace Maynard to provide some sort of aid to East Tennessee's Unionists, agreed with the plan. He allotted $2,500 for the operation, and Carter returned to Camp Dick Robinson to begin making arrangements.

=== Recruiting ===
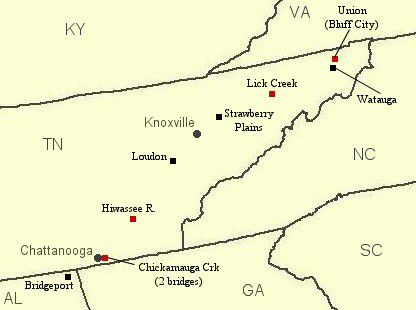
Bridges targeted by the bridge burners on the night of November 8, 1861; the red squares indicate bridges that were successfully destroyed; Knoxville and Chattanooga are shown for reference

The nine bridges targeted were, from northeast to southwest: the bridge over the Holston River at Union (modern Bluff City); the bridge over the Watauga River at Carter's Depot (modern Watauga); the bridge over Lick Creek near Mosheim; the bridge over the Holston at Strawberry Plains; the bridge over the Tennessee River at Loudon; the bridge over the Hiwassee River at Charleston; two bridges over Chickamauga Creek in the vicinity of Chattanooga; and the bridge over the Tennessee at Bridgeport, Alabama. All were on the ET&V or ET&G lines with the exception of the Bridgeport bridge, which was on the Memphis and Charleston, and one of the Chickamauga Creek bridges, which was on the Western and Atlantic.

In mid-October 1861, Carter set up a "command post" in Kingston, Tennessee. Captains David Fry and William Cross, two officers who had been assigned to the operation, were tasked with burning the Lick Creek and Loudon bridges, respectively (although Cross's role has never been fully verified). Carter recruited Alfred Cate of Hamilton County to oversee the destruction of the bridges in southeast Tennessee, and he assigned the Union and Watauga bridges to Daniel Stover, a son-in-law of Andrew Johnson. For the Strawberry Plains bridge, he recruited former Sevier County sheriff William C. Pickens.

Each of Carter's "lieutenants" in turn recruited reliable men to assist them. Cate assigned R.B. Rogan and James Keener to the Bridgeport bridge; William T. Cate (his brother) and W. H. Crowder to the Chickamauga Creek bridges; and Cate personally led the attack on the Hiwassee bridge, with the assistance of Thomas Cate (another brother), Adam Thomas, and Jesse and Eli Cleveland. Fry chose Greene Countians Jacob and Thomas Harmon, Jacob Hensie, Alex Haun, and Harrison and Hugh Self. Pickens recruited several fellow Sevier Countians, among them David Ray, James Montgomery, and Elijah Gamble.

== Attacks ==
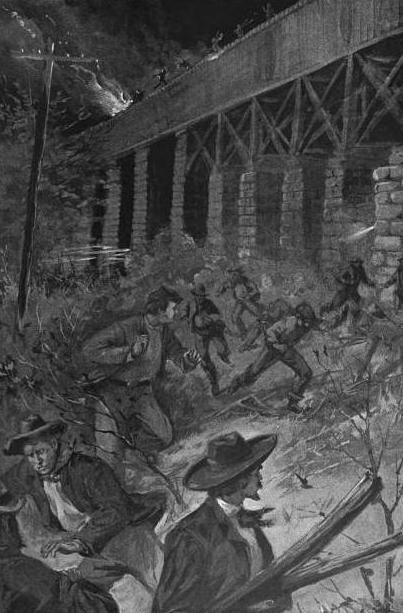
Depiction of the attacks in Barton's A Hero In Homespun

While Carter recruited conspirators, Union forces at Camp Dick Robinson prepared to march south to Knoxville. A raid into Kentucky by Zollicoffer, though repulsed, changed the timing of the invasion, and following Confederate excursions into the western part of the state, Sherman became concerned that his line was stretched too thin. Thomas arrived at Crab Orchard, Kentucky, about 40 miles (64 km) from Cumberland Gap, on October 31 and pleaded with Sherman to give the go-ahead. Sherman was unconvinced and called off the invasion on November 7.

The bridge burners, unaware of the shift in strategy in Kentucky, proceeded with their plans on the night of November 8. The Chickamauga Creek and Hiwassee bridges were poorly guarded, and Cate and his men burned them with minimal effort. The Bridgeport, Loudon, and Watauga bridges were heavily guarded by Confederate soldiers, and conspirators abandoned their attempts to destroy them. The Lick Creek and Union bridges were guarded only by one or two sentries each, whom the conspirators easily overpowered before setting fire to the bridges.

At the Strawberry Plains bridge, Pickens and his crew encountered a lone Confederate guard, James Keeling (also spelled Keelan in some sources). When Pickens attempted to light a torch, Keeling spotted him, and attacked. In the ensuing melee, both Keeling and Pickens were badly wounded. Keeling fled, leaving the bridge exposed, but Pickens had lost the group's matches in the chaos and darkness. Unable to light a fire, the group aborted their mission and returned to Sevier County.

== Aftermath ==
=== Confederate response ===
News of the bridge burnings thrust East Tennessee's Confederate leaders into what Knoxville attorney Oliver Perry Temple described as a "wild and unreasonable panic." The Confederate government in Richmond was flooded with exaggerated reports of rising Unionist activity in the region. Confederate district attorney J.C. Ramsey vowed to hang anyone involved in the conspiracy, and Zollicoffer, who had initially followed a more lenient policy, rounded up and jailed dozens of known Unionists.

After some consideration by the military and Confederate government, Confederate War Secretary Judah P. Benjamin issued an order. "All such as can be identified in having been engaged in bridge-burning are to be tried summarily by drum-head court martial, and, if found guilty, executed on the spot by hanging in the vicinity of the burned bridges". Several were found guilty, and five were hanged. For those who had not participating in the burnings but had otherwise been identified as part of the organized Unionists, Benjamin ordered, "All such as have not been engaged are to be treated as prisoners of war" and were to be transported and held as such.

Among the detained Unionists were several Lick Creek bridge conspirators, identified by one of the Confederate sentries they had captured and freed. Confederate authorities also arrested Samuel Pickens (father of William), physician Robert H. Hodsden, and Edmond and William Hodges, all of Sevier County; William Hunt and former Knoxville Register editor John M. Fleming, both of Knox County; Montgomery Thornburgh, James Meek and Samuel Johnson, all of Jefferson County; and Levi Trewhitt of Bradley County.

=== Trials and executions ===
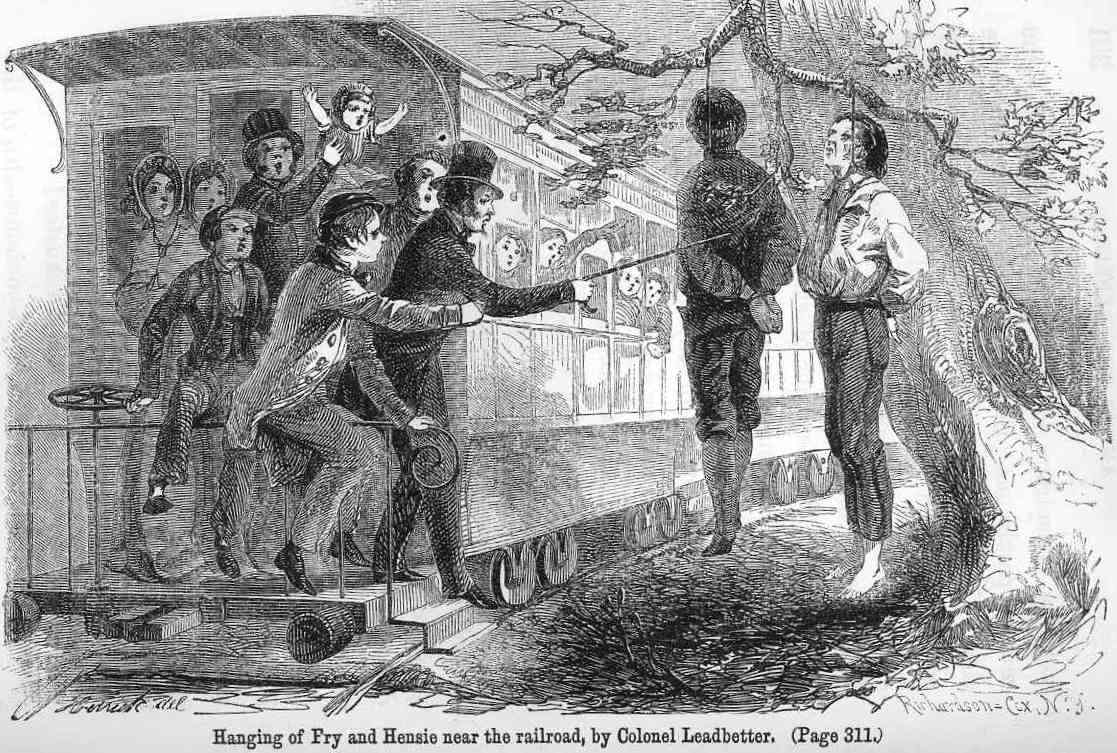
Passers-by abusing the corpses of conspirators Hensie and Fry, as depicted in Brownlow's Sketches

Confederate judge West H. Humphreys, citing lack of evidence, threw out many of the cases against the accused Unionists, agitating Ramsey and the Confederate military authorities. On November 30, Zollicoffer suspended habeas corpus and instituted martial law, implementing Benjamin's order to try the accused by court-martial. Pro-Union attorneys Temple and John Baxter provided legal defense, though they realized the accused stood little chance of acquittal, and typically had the accused read statements denouncing the court-martial as illegal.

Among the conspirators, the Lick Creek bridge burners suffered the greatest number of executions. Jacob Hensie and Henry Fry were both tried and hanged in sight of the railroad at Greeneville on November 30, 1861. Alex Haun was tried and hanged at a gallows just north of Knoxville on December 10. Jacob Harmon and his son Henry were both hanged on December 17. Harrison Self was tried, convicted and sentenced to hang, but he was released hours before his execution after his daughter Elizabeth obtained a last-minute pardon from President Jefferson Davis.

Following Benjamin's order, Unionists not directly involved in the conspiracy were imprisoned in Tuscaloosa, Alabama. In all, more than 150 people were arrested and jailed on suspicion of supporting the bridge burnings or inciting other acts of Union violence in East Tennessee.

=== Brownlow's involvement ===
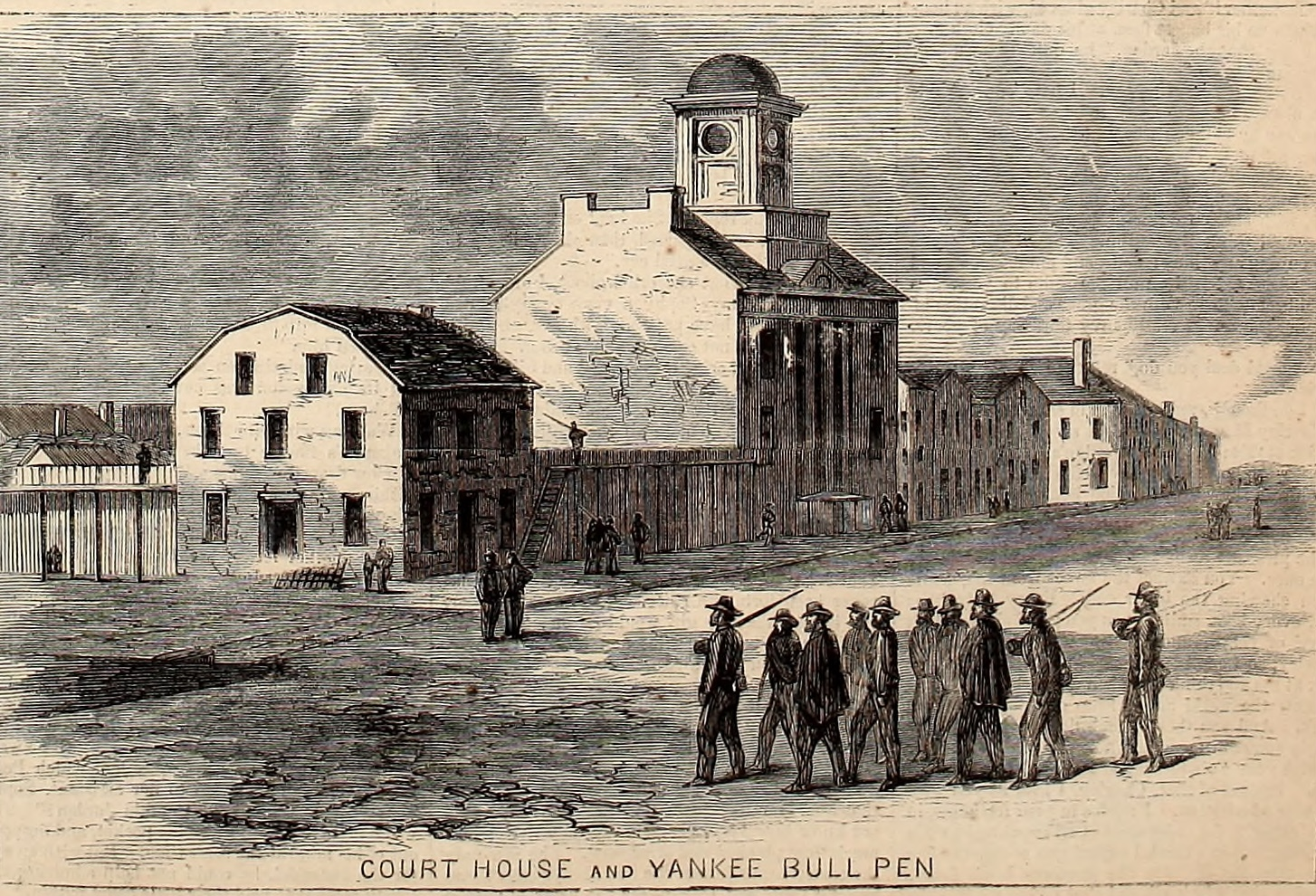
Detail of Theodore R. Davis's The War in Tennessee - Views at Knoxville and Vicinity depicting "Courthouse and Yankee Bull Pen" in Knoxville where Brownlow and other East Tennessee Unionists were jailed (Harper's Weekly, April 9, 1864)

Confederate authorities immediately suspected Parson Brownlow, the radical pro-Union editor of the Knoxville Whig, of engineering the bridge burnings. Brownlow had written in a May 1861 editorial, "let the railroad on which Union citizens of East Tennessee are conveyed to Montgomery in irons be eternally and hopelessly destroyed," and had suspiciously gone into hiding in Sevier County two weeks before the attacks. Brownlow denied any involvement, however, and in a letter to William H. Carroll he condemns the attacks. Lacking evidence of Brownlow's complicity and wanting to be rid of his agitations, Confederate authorities offered him safe passage to the northern states.

District Attorney Ramsey, whose prominent Knoxville family had been on the receiving end of Brownlow's abusive harangues for nearly two decades, remained convinced of Brownlow's involvement. In spite of the Confederate government's promise of safe passage, Ramsey had Brownlow jailed after he had arrived back in Knoxville. Incarcerated with many of the bridge burners, Brownlow kept a daily journal in which he recorded several eyewitness accounts of the arrests, imprisonment, and executions of many of the conspirators.

=== Later actions of the bridge burners ===
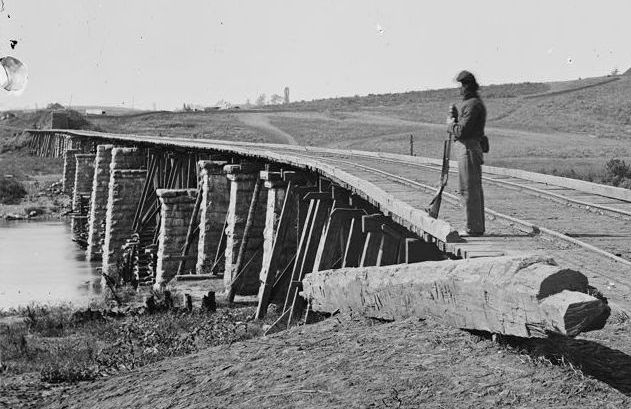
A Union sentry guards the bridge at Strawberry Plains, ca. 1864

In the weeks following the bridge burnings, William Carter returned to Kentucky to continue to pressure Union commanders to invade East Tennessee. William Pickens, Daniel Stover, and Alfred Cate all fled to Kentucky and enlisted in the Union Army. David Fry was captured in Georgia in the spring of 1862 and ordered to hang, but he managed to escape. Union forces under Ambrose Burnside invaded East Tennessee and entered Knoxville unopposed in September 1863.

After his release in early 1862, Brownlow published his prison journal in his book, Sketches of the Rise, Progress and Decline of Secession. Aimed at northern readers, the book's chapter on the bridge burners focuses on alleged atrocities committed by Confederate soldiers and politicians and includes several engravings depicting the executions and last moments of some of the condemned conspirators. Following his return to Knoxville on the heels of Burnside's invasion in 1863, Brownlow vengefully pursued all who had prosecuted the bridge burners.

== Legacy ==
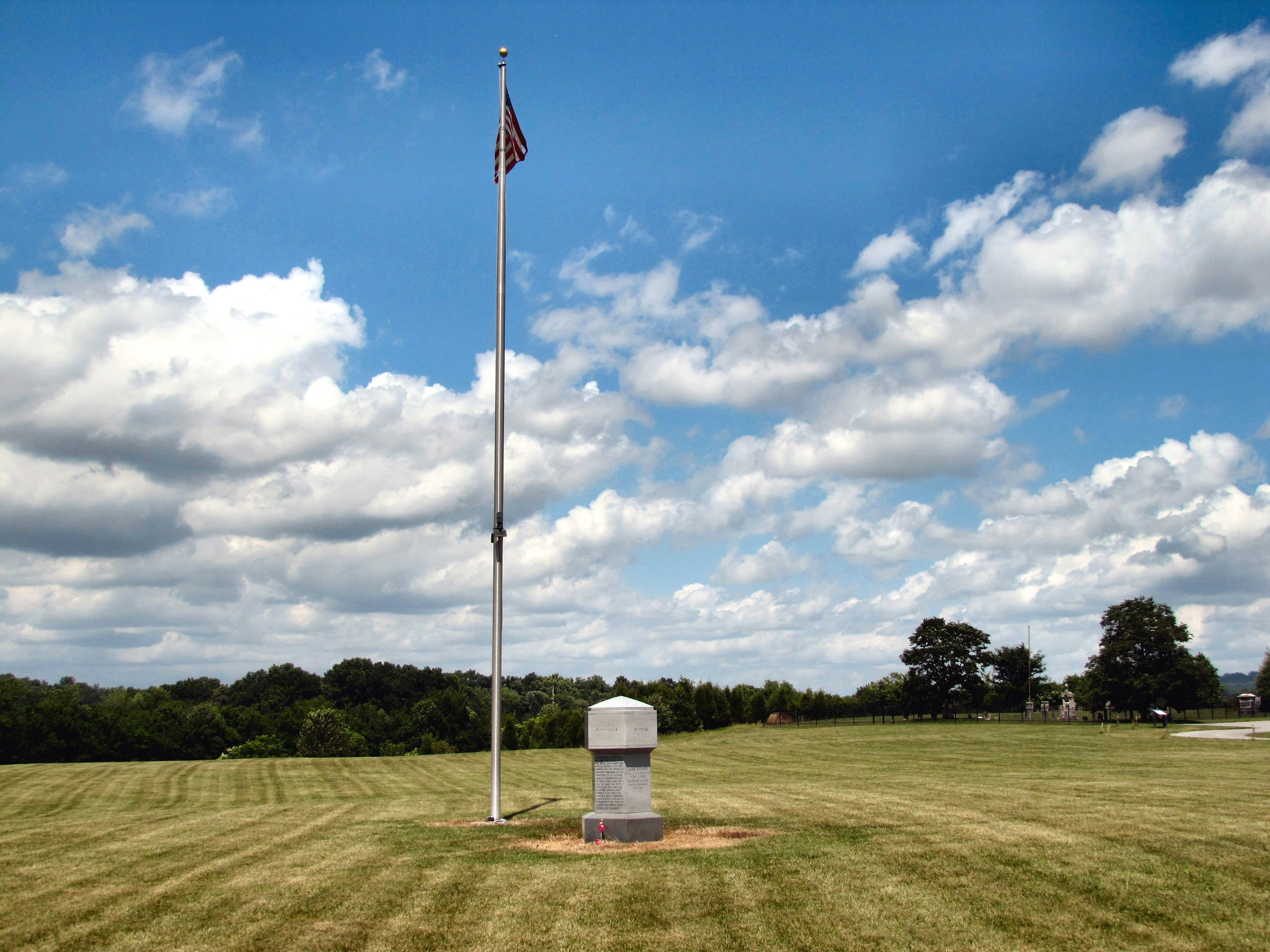
Pottertown Bridge Burners memorial near Mosheim, dedicated to the Lick Creek bridge burners

Having sworn an oath of secrecy, William Carter never revealed the names of anyone involved in the bridge-burning conspiracy, not even after the war had been over for decades. As a result, many of the conspirators are still unknown. In 1871, the names of the southeastern Tennessee conspirators were made public when their leader, Alfred Cate, petitioned Congress for compensation for their actions. Temple uncovered still more names through correspondence with known conspirators as he collected information for his book, East Tennessee and the Civil War, in the 1890s.

Along with the detailed account in Temple's book, several accounts of the bridge burnings have been published. In 1862, Radford Gatlin, a Confederate who had been chased out of his largely pro-Union namesake mountain town, published a glorified account of James Keeling's actions at the Strawberry Plains bridge. Union supporters Thomas William Humes and William Rule, who were both in Knoxville when the bridges were burned, included brief accounts of the conspiracy in their respective works on the war in the late 1880s. Novelist William E. Barton published a fictional version of the bridge-burning conspiracy in the late 1890s. In 1995, Cameron Judd published an historical novel about the incident, entitled The Bridge Burners. In 1996, Donahue Bible, a Greene County native and historian, published a book about the Lick Creek bridge burners entitled, Broken Vessels: The Story of the Hanging of the Pottertown Bridge Burners.

In 2002, a granite monument was erected near Mosheim to honor the five Pottertown bridge burners who were hanged by Confederate authorities for their role in destroying the Lick Creek bridge. The monument stands near Harmon Cemetery, where two of the bridge burners, Jacob and Henry Harmon, are buried. A nearby road, connecting Pottertown Road with U.S. Route 11, has been named "Bridge Burners Boulevard."

== See also ==
- Great Locomotive Chase
- State of Scott
- Republic of Winston
- Nickajack
