= Thomas Dickens Arnold =

American politician

Thomas D. Arnold

Member of the U.S. House of Representatives from Tennessee's 2nd district
- In office March 4, 1831 – March 3, 1833
- Preceded by: Pryor Lea
- Succeeded by: Samuel Bunch

Member of the U.S. House of Representatives from Tennessee's 1st district
- In office March 4, 1841 – March 3, 1843
- Preceded by: William B. Carter
- Succeeded by: Andrew Johnson

Personal details
- Born: May 3, 1798 Spotsylvania County, Virginia, U.S.
- Died: May 26, 1870 (aged 72) Jonesborough, Tennessee, U.S.
- Party: Whig
- Spouse: Loretta Rose Arnold
- Profession: Attorney

Thomas Dickens Arnold (May 3, 1798 – May 26, 1870) was an American politician who served two terms in the United States House of Representatives, representing Tennessee's 2nd district from 1831 to 1833, and the 1st district from 1841 to 1843. Arnold, reportedly a slave owner, was pro-Union. A staunch opponent of Andrew Jackson, he spent his first term in Congress trying to thwart the Jackson Administration's agenda, and subsequently helped establish the Whig Party in Tennessee. He was twice gerrymandered out of office by Jackson's allies in the state legislature.

Described as "one of the most erratic politicians ever produced by East Tennessee," Arnold was remembered by his peers for his impassioned and unpredictable speeches, unwavering dedication to his positions, and ruthless use of wit and sarcasm. His attacks against Sam Houston in Congress provoked an assassination attempt from a Houston supporter in 1832. While Arnold provided vigorous opposition to Democrats such as Andrew Johnson, he frequently clashed with leaders of his own party, such as William "Parson" Brownlow and T.A.R. Nelson.

On the eve of the Civil War, Arnold remained solidly pro-Union. At the East Tennessee Convention, which met following Tennessee's secession from the Union in June 1861, Arnold advocated the separation of East Tennessee from the rest of the state, and called for the use of force if necessary. He remained openly defiant of the Confederacy for the duration of the war.

== Early life ==
Arnold was born in Spotsylvania County, Virginia, on May 3, 1798. He moved with his parents to Knox County, Tennessee, in 1808. At the age of fourteen, he enlisted as a drummer boy in the War of 1812. During the war, he became horrified when General Andrew Jackson ordered a soldier court-martialed and shot for straggling, and developed a negative view of Jackson that he would retain for the rest of his life. After the war, he taught school in Knox and Grainger counties. He studied law, was admitted to the bar in 1822, and commenced practice in Knoxville, Tennessee.

In the mid-1820s, Arnold was one of the few Tennessee politicians who opposed the initiatives of Jackson. In 1825, he unsuccessfully ran for Congress against Jackson ally and three-term 2nd district incumbent John Cocke, losing by a vote of 4,770 to 3,343. When he again ran for the seat in 1827, he circulated a pamphlet in the 2nd district that assailed Jackson's character, and rehashed an oft-repeated accusation that Jackson was an adulterer. He was narrowly defeated by the pro-Jackson candidate, Pryor Lea, 3,688 votes to 3,316. In 1828, Arnold endorsed John Quincy Adams for president.

In 1829, Arnold again opposed Lea for the 2nd district seat, and was again narrowly defeated, 4,713 votes to 4,496. Arnold charged Lea with voter fraud, alleging that bribery and perjury had occurred, and suggesting that pro-Jackson state election officials had "prostituted and trampled under foot" the state's election laws. The House Committee on Elections dismissed his claim, however, citing lack of evidence.

== 1st congressional term ==
By the early 1830s, many East Tennesseans had grown frustrated with Lea's opposition to federally funded internal improvements, as the mountainous region's isolation was stalling its economic development. In 1831, Arnold was finally elected to Congress, edging Lea by a vote of 4,935 to 4,702.

During his first term in Congress, Arnold was the lone Anti-Jacksonite in the Tennessee delegation. He supported the national bank, an institution Jackson had long sought to eliminate, scoffing at the "obfuscated farragoes" of the bank's enemies, who had threatened him. He was the only Tennessee representative to vote against Congressman James K. Polk's bill calling for a sale of the government's stock in the bank, and was the only Tennessee representative to support a bill declaring the bank's deposits safe. He was also the only Tennessee representative to vote in favor of building a federal road connecting Buffalo and New Orleans, and the only Tennessee representative to vote against Jackson's Force Bill.

In 1832, Arnold blasted former Congressman Sam Houston, who had been found guilty of assaulting Congressman William Stanbery (an anti-Jacksonite), but had drawn only a reprimand for the attack. In May, a friend of Houston's, Morgan A. Heard, attacked Arnold as he descended the steps of the Capitol, initially attempting to club him with a large stick. After Arnold batted the stick away, Heard drew a sawed-off dueling pistol and fired one shot, grazing Arnold's shoulder. Arnold then proceeded to beat Heard with a sword cane, and was preparing to spear Heard with the cane when he was disarmed by Congressman Joseph Duncan, ending the melee.

Fed up with Arnold, Jackson's allies in the Tennessee General Assembly redrew Arnold's district, moving Jefferson and Cocke counties, where Arnold had his strongest support, to the 1st district. Undaunted, Arnold moved to Greeneville, in the 1st district, and challenged the 1st district incumbent, John Blair, in the 1833 election. In a three-way race that included William Blount Carter, Arnold placed third, winning just 1,747 votes to 3,236 for Blair and 2,642 for Carter. He ran for the 1st district seat in 1835 and 1837, but each time lost to Carter.

In 1836, Arnold was elected brigadier general of the Tennessee militia, and was thus frequently referred to as "General Arnold" by his contemporaries.

== 1840 election and 2nd congressional term ==
In 1840, Arnold was named the 1st district's elector for presidential candidate William Henry Harrison. In this role, Arnold canvassed relentlessly, confronting any Democratic speaker who ventured into the district, and following them from campaign stop to campaign stop until they left.

At a stop in Greeneville, Arnold, wearing a bizarre nankeen suit with blue, yellow and white stripes, debated an elegantly dressed Felix Grundy. Arnold continuously interrupted Grundy's speech, prompting Grundy to quip, "you are the noisiest man I ever met." Arnold followed Grundy's entourage to Rogersville, where Grundy spoke at the courthouse the following day. Still wearing the nankeen suit, which had been soaked and ruined by rain the night before, Arnold burst into the courthouse and shouted, "Here I am again!" After being denied entry, he led Whig supporters in a noisy sing-along until the Democratic crowd dispersed and Grundy hurried to the next stop.

Fueled by the regional fame he had acquired as an elector, Arnold again sought the 1st district seat in 1841. In April of that year, he engaged in a war of words with local Whig attorney, T.A.R. Nelson, who was irritated that Arnold had ignored the rules laid out at the local party convention when declaring his candidacy. After the two attacked each other in respective editorials, Arnold circulated a 48-page pamphlet in which he accused Nelson of trying to split the party, and went so far as to make fun of Nelson's limp. In a May 1841 editorial, Nelson wrote of Arnold, "I feel constrained to publish him as a liar, a scoundrel and a Coward."

In spite of his feud with Nelson, Arnold easily won the election in 1841. Like many of his fellow Whigs in Congress, he grew increasingly frustrated with President John Tyler, who had run with Harrison on the Whig ticket, but was proving hostile to many of the party's core initiatives. Following Tyler's veto of a Henry Clay bill calling for the establishment of a new national bank, Arnold dismissed Tyler as an "unfortunate miserable wretch." In 1842, Arnold came to the defense of John Quincy Adams when Congressman Henry A. Wise accused Adams of conspiring with the British to break up the United States.

After the state legislature again redrew his district, Arnold, realizing had little chance of being reelected, declined to run in 1843.

== Later life and the Civil War ==
After leaving Congress, Arnold returned to the practice of law. Using the aggressive, emotional style that had made him successful in politics, he gradually built a sizable clientele. Oliver Perry Temple, a fellow attorney and Whig, wrote of Arnold's courtroom tactics: "By ridicule on the one hand, and impassioned appeals on the other, he constantly excited laughter or tears, while his power of invective was simply terrible." Temple noted that Arnold occasionally won cases when facts and evidence were against him by stubbornly seizing on a trivial circumstance of the case and focusing the jury's attention on it.

In 1852, Arnold spoke at a Whig convention in Knoxville. For nearly an hour, he thrashed radical Whig newspaper editor William "Parson" Brownlow in what Temple described as the "bitterest and most taunting manner." Brownlow, who was in attendance, waited quietly for Arnold to finish, and then delivered an equally long retort. Brownlow subsequently entitled this speech, "Reply to Thomas 'Dog' Arnold, Ass."

In the years leading up to the Civil War, Arnold, like many of East Tennessee's Whigs, remained staunchly pro-Union. Throughout the first half of 1861, Arnold, Brownlow, Temple, Nelson, and other Whig leaders relentlessly canvassed East Tennessee to rally support for the Union cause. At the first session of the East Tennessee Convention in May 1861, Arnold delivered a two-hour speech that, according to Temple, was the "finest effort of his life."

At the convention's Greeneville session in June (which met after Tennessee had seceded from the Union), Arnold "warmly advocated" a series of resolutions that called for East Tennessee to break away from Tennessee and form a separate Union-aligned state, and to use violent force if necessary. Temple and others proposed a milder set of resolutions (which were eventually adopted) that petitioned the state legislature to let East Tennessee secede, but removed the resolution threatening violent force. Temple later recalled that Arnold mocked these resolutions as cowardly, and "poured a perfect broadside of ridicule and sarcasm."

Arnold spent most of the war at his home in Greeneville, ignoring threats to Union supporters who remained in the region while it was under Confederate control. His family was divided during the war, with two of his sons serving as officers in the Confederate Army.

After the war, Arnold resumed his practice of law. He died on May 26, 1870, while attending court in Jonesborough.

== See also ==
- John Bell
- John Netherland

U.S. House of Representatives
Preceded by Pryor Lea	Member of the U.S. House of Representatives from Tennessee's 2nd congressional district 1831-1833	Succeeded by Samuel Bunch
Preceded by William B. Carter	Member of the U.S. House of Representatives from Tennessee's 1st congressional district 1841-1843	Succeeded by Andrew Johnson
