= William Blount Carter =

American politician

Member of the U.S. House of Representatives from Tennessee's 1st district
- In office March 4, 1835 – March 3, 1841
- Preceded by: John Blair
- Succeeded by: Thomas D. Arnold

Member of the Tennessee House of Representatives

Member of the Tennessee Senate

Personal details
- Born: October 22, 1792 Elizabethton, Tennessee
- Died: April 17, 1848 (aged 55) Elizabethton, Tennessee
- Party: Whig
- Relations: Samuel P. Carter (nephew); Nathaniel G. Taylor (nephew)
- Profession: soldier, politician

William Blount Carter (October 22, 1792 – April 17, 1848) was an American politician who represented Tennessee's first district in the United States House of Representatives.

== Biography ==
Carter was born in Elizabethton, Tennessee on October 22, 1792. He attended the public schools and served as a colonel in the United States Army during the War of 1812.

== Career ==
Carter served as a member of the Tennessee House of Representatives and he served in the Tennessee Senate. He was a delegate to the State constitutional convention in 1834 and served as its presiding officer.

Carter was elected as an Anti-Jacksonian to the Twenty-fourth United States Congress and as a Whig to the Twenty-fifth and Twenty-sixth Congresses. He served as a U.S. Representative from March 4, 1835 to March 3, 1841. He owned slaves.

== Death ==
Carter died in Elizabethton, Tennessee on April 17, 1848 (age 55 years, 178 days). He is interred at the Carter Cemetery at Elizabethton.

== Family ==
Carter was an uncle of General Samuel P. Carter and Congressman Nathaniel Green Taylor. Another nephew, also named William Blount Carter (1820–1902), was a prominent Southern Unionist and mastermind of the East Tennessee bridge burnings during the Civil War.

U.S. House of Representatives
Preceded by John Blair	Member of the U.S. House of Representatives from Tennessee's 1st congressional district 1835-1841	Succeeded by Thomas D. Arnold
