= Alabama and Tennessee River Railroad =

American railway line

Overview
- Locale: Alabama
- Dates of operation: 1848–1866
- Successor: Selma, Rome and Dalton Railroad Company; Georgia Southern Railroad Company; The East Tennessee, Virginia and Georgia RailroadCompany; The East Tennessee, Virginia and Georgia Railway Company

Technical
- Track gauge: 4 ft 8 1/2 in (1,435 mm) standard gauge after the American Civil War
- Previous gauge: 5 ft (1,524 mm) during the American Civil War and 4 ft 9 in (1,448 mm)

Alabama and Tennessee River Rail Road Company was incorporated under act of Alabama on March 4, 1848. With John Anderson Dilliard being principal shareholder. J. A. Dilliard a LaGrange, Tennessee, native originally from Decatur, AL was also a principal owner in the Lagrange and Memphis Railroad which became the Memphis and Charleston Railroad, along with Joseph Dilliard and H.B. Dilliard.

Alabama and Tennessee River Railroad Company constructed 135 miles (217 km) of railroad line between Selma, Alabama and Blue Mountain, Alabama, including part of an extension of about 22.5 miles (36.2 km) of line from Blue Mountain toward Dalton, Georgia, in 1862.

A. D. Breed operated the line under lease From the Union Railroad Trust between May 31, 1866, and August 8, 1866, in accordance with a contract to rehabilitate the railroad line and construct the extension dated May 25, 1866.

After the American Civil War, Former Confederate General Joseph E. Johnston became president of the Alabama and Tennessee River Rail Road Company from May 1866 to November 1867. During Johnston's tenure, on August 6, 1866, Alabama and Tennessee River Rail Road Company consolidated with Georgia and Alabama Rail Road Company and Dalton and Jacksonville Railroad Company to form the Selma, Rome and Dalton Railroad Company. The consolidation agreement was ratified by the Georgia General Assembly on December 13, 1866, and by the Alabama Legislature on February 8, 1867.

The Selma, Rome and Dalton Railroad Company constructed or reconstructed 100.3 miles (161.4 km) of railroad line between Blue Mountain, Alabama and Dalton, Georgia, in 1870.

The rehabilitation of the property after the American Civil War and the construction of the 100.3 miles (161.4 km) extension of the line between Blue Mountain and Dalton was funded mainly by the sale of consolidated first-mortgage seven per cent bonds and second-mortgage seven per cent bonds.

The railroad in Georgia was sold in foreclosure on November 3, 1874, and conveyed to Georgia Southern Railroad Company on March 29, 1876. The Georgia Southern Railroad Company was sold to East Tennessee, Virginia and Georgia Railroad Company on November 6, 1880. The railroad in Alabama was sold at foreclosure on June 14, 1880, and sold to East Tennessee, Virginia and Georgia Railroad Company on February 5 and 11, 1881.

East Tennessee, Virginia and Georgia Railroad Company went into receivership on January 7, 1885, was sold in foreclosure on May 25, 1886, and conveyed to East Tennessee, Virginia and Georgia Railway Company on June 30, 1886.

The property eventually became part of Southern Railway Company on July 7, 1894, through its acquisition of the East Tennessee, Virginia and Georgia Railway Company.

== See also ==
- Confederate railroads in the American Civil War
- Selma, Rome and Dalton Railroad
