= Selma, Rome and Dalton Railroad =

American railroad company

Overview
- Locale: Alabama
- Dates of operation: 1866–1881
- Successor: The East Tennessee, Virginia and Georgia RailroadCompany; The East Tennessee, Virginia and Georgia Railway Company

Technical
- Track gauge: 4 ft 8 1/2 in (1,435 mm)
- Previous gauge: 5 ft (1,524 mm); American Civil War era

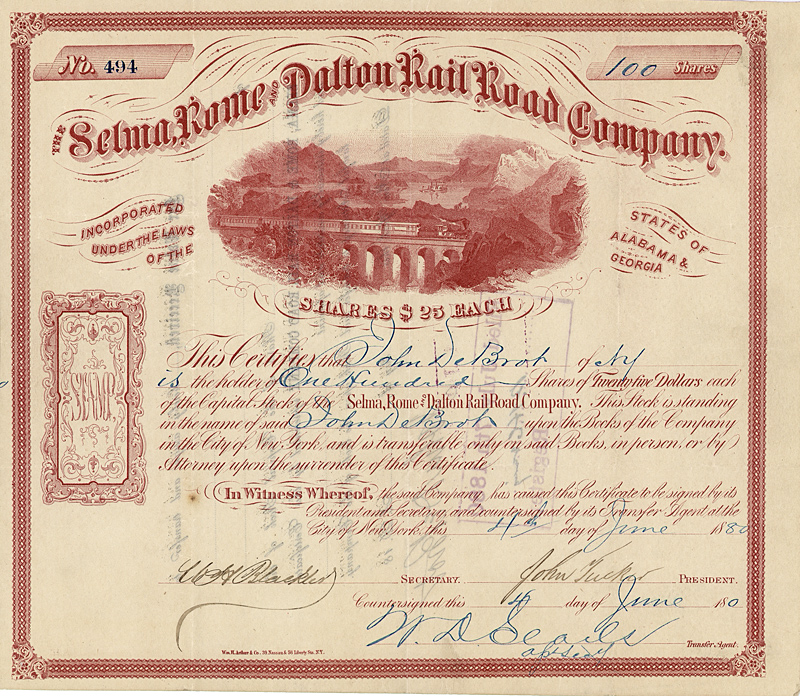
Share of the Selma, Rome and Dalton Rail Road Company from 4 June 1880

Selma, Rome and Dalton Railroad Company was formed by the consolidation of Alabama and Tennessee River Rail Road Company (incorporated under act of Alabama, March 4, 1848), Georgia and Alabama Rail Road Company (incorporated under act of Georgia, February 18, 1854) and Dalton and Jacksonville Railroad Company (incorporated under act of Georgia as Dalton and Gadsden Railroad Company on February 18, 1854) on August 6, 1866. The consolidation agreement was ratified by the Georgia General Assembly on December 13, 1866 and by the Alabama Legislature on February 8, 1867.

The consolidation occurred while Former Confederate General Joseph E. Johnston who had become president of the Alabama and Tennessee River Rail Road Company after the American Civil War. Johnston's tenure as president was from May 1866 to November 1867.

Alabama and Tennessee River Railroad Company had constructed 135 miles (217 km) of railroad line between Selma, Alabama and Blue Mountain, Alabama, including part of an extension of about 22.5 miles (36.2 km) of line from Blue Mountain toward Dalton, Georgia, in 1862.

A. D. Breed operated the line under lease between May 31, 1866 and August 8, 1866 in accordance with a contract to rehabilitate the railroad line and construct the extension dated May 25, 1866.

The Selma, Rome and Dalton Railroad Company constructed or reconstructed 100.3 miles (161.4 km) of railroad line between Blue Mountain, Alabama and Dalton, Georgia in 1870.

The rehabilitation of the property after the American Civil War and the construction of the 100.3 miles (161.4 km) extension of the line between Blue Mountain and Dalton was funded mainly by the sale of consolidated first-mortgage seven per cent bonds and second-mortgage seven per cent bonds.

The railroad in Georgia was sold in foreclosure on November 3, 1874 and conveyed to Georgia Southern Railroad Company on March 29, 1876. The Georgia Southern Railroad Company was sold to East Tennessee, Virginia and Georgia Railroad Company on November 6, 1880. The railroad in Alabama was sold at foreclosure on June 14, 1880 and sold to East Tennessee, Virginia and Georgia Railroad Company on February 5 and 11, 1881.

East Tennessee, Virginia and Georgia Railroad Company went into receivership on January 7, 1885, was sold in foreclosure on May 25, 1886, and conveyed to East Tennessee, Virginia and Georgia Railway Company on June 30, 1886.

The property eventually became part of Southern Railway Company on July 7, 1894, through its acquisition of the East Tennessee, Virginia and Georgia Railway Company.

== See also ==
- Alabama and Tennessee River Railroad
- Confederate railroads in the American Civil War
- East Tennessee, Virginia and Georgia Railroad
