= Carter family (disambiguation) =

Carter family could refer to several different families. For individuals with the surname "Carter", see Carter (surname).

- Carter Family, a band
- Carter family of Tennessee, settlers in Tennessee, US
- Family of Jimmy Carter, former US president
- The Carters, the musical duo of Beyoncé and Jay-Z

== See also ==
- The Carter Sisters, a band
- The siblings Nick, Aaron, and Leslie Carter, who appeared on the television show House of Carters
