= Carter family of Tennessee =

Members of the Carter family were "among the earliest settlers of Tennessee" and their descendants became "one of the most illustrious families in the state."

- John Carter of Watauga Association
  - Landon C. Carter, Revolutionary War soldier, namesake of Carter County, Tennessee while Elizabethton is named for his wife Elizabeth Maclin
    - U.S. Representative William Blount Carter
    - Mary Carter
      - U.S. Representative Nathaniel Green Taylor
        - Tennessee governor Alf Taylor
        - Tennessee governor and U.S. Senator Robert Love Taylor
    - Alfred Moore Carter
      - Union Army officer Samuel Perry Carter
      - Rev. William Blount Carter
      - Secretary of Arizona Territory James Patton Taylor Carter

== See also ==
- Landon Carter Haynes
