= Mohawk, Tennessee =

Unincorporated community in Greene County, Tennessee

Coordinates: 36°12′0″N 83°3′10.08″W

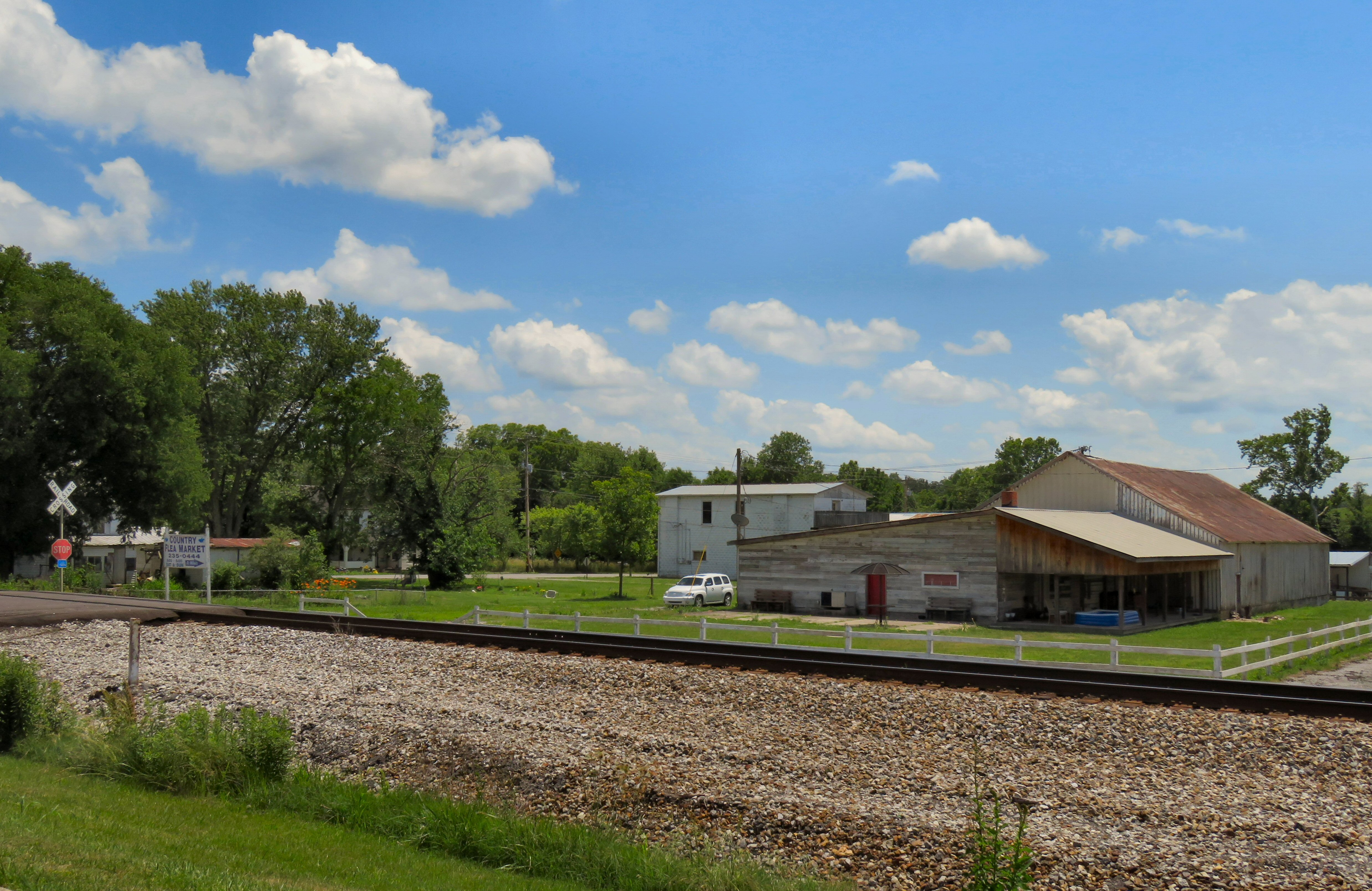
Buildings by the railroad tracks and North Mohawk Road

Mohawk is an unincorporated community in western Greene County, eastern Tennessee, located 15 miles (24 km) west of the town of Greeneville.

The community is situated between two hills near the confluence of Riley and Lick creeks, just west of where the Norfolk Southern tracks cross a bridge over Lick Creek.

According to local tradition, Mohawk was originally known as "Lick Creek Siding," and later as "Pane." The name was changed by residents to "Mohawk" after a group of Indians passed through the area during the Civil War. By the 1940s, Mohawk had developed into a "fairly prosperous rural community." It had a roller mill, a car dealership, and a general store.

== Education ==
All areas of Greene County that are not within the city limits of Greeneville are in the Greene County School District.

Mohawk is home to McDonald Elementary School, a Greene County public school that includes Pre-kindergarten through Fifth Grade. The site was originally used for the McDonald High School, built in 1919 on 6 acres (24,000 m^{2}) of land donated by Alex Ailshie. Its namesake was Earnest McDonald, a wealthy bachelor who donated money to build the school. The original building was demolished in 1957, and replaced by the brick building that is in use today. McDonald High School was dissolved after the 1966–67 school year, when students were directed to a regional high school. This building was converted for use as an elementary school; however in 2019, the middle school building was converted for other purposes, re-directing middle schoolers to West Greene Middle School.
