= Christopher Haun =

19th-century potter from Tennessee, USA

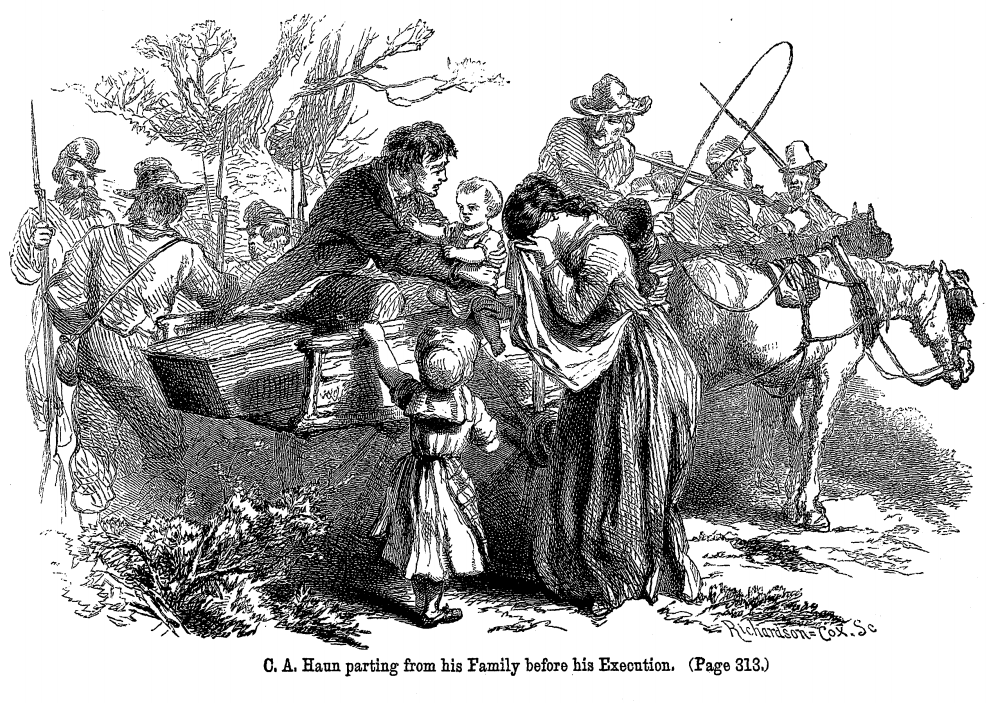
- C.A. Haun departing from his family before his execution
- Born: September 14, 1821; Greene County, Tennessee, U.S.
- Died: December 11, 1861 (aged 40); Knoxville, Tennessee, U.S.
- Cause of death: Execution by hanging
- Occupation: Potter
- Military career
- Allegiance: United States of America
- Branch: Union Army
- Unit: 2nd Regiment Tennessee Volunteer Infantry
- Conflicts: East Tennessee bridge burnings

Christopher Alexander "Alex" Haun (September 14, 1821 – December 11, 1861) was a potter from Greene County, Tennessee, regarded as one of the most notable and skilled of the antebellum period. During the American Civil War, he was executed by the Confederate States of America for participation in the East Tennessee bridge-burning conspiracy.

== Biography ==
Haun was one of many examples in 19th century Tennessee of what were later referred to as family potters, rural potters who ran businesses, often part-time as a supplement to farming and with the aid of their families, supplying practical vessels for local use. Stephen T. Rogers of the Tennessee Historical Commission writes that Haun "produced some of the most beautiful and finely crafted lead-glazed earthenware in Tennessee". Haun and a number of potters lived in a part of Greene County referred to as Pottertown, using local clay found near Lick Creek. Pottertown was a staunchly Unionist enclave within a Confederate state.

Union supporter Reverend William Blount Carter launched a plan, with the approval of President Abraham Lincoln, to destroy Tennessee bridges and disrupt the Confederate railroad system. Haun and other local potters were recruited to destroy the bridge over Lick Creek. On November 8, 1861, after being sworn into Company F of the 2nd Regiment Tennessee Volunteer Infantry, they proceeded to the bridge and destroyed it. There they captured Confederate sentries and released them after they swore an oath to the union. However, the Confederate soldiers informed the authorities, and Haun and four others were captured. Haun and three others were hanged for treason at the Knoxville, Tennessee jail on December 11.

Before he died, he wrote to his wife regarding the disposition of his pottery business and concluded:

I have the promise that my body will be sent home to you.
O live for heaven,
Oh my bosom friend and children,
Live for heaven I pray.
My time is almost out, dear friend, farewell to this world — farewell to earth and earthly troubles.
