= Lick Creek (Greene County) =

Stream in Tennessee

Coordinates: 36°10′15″N 83°10′04″W

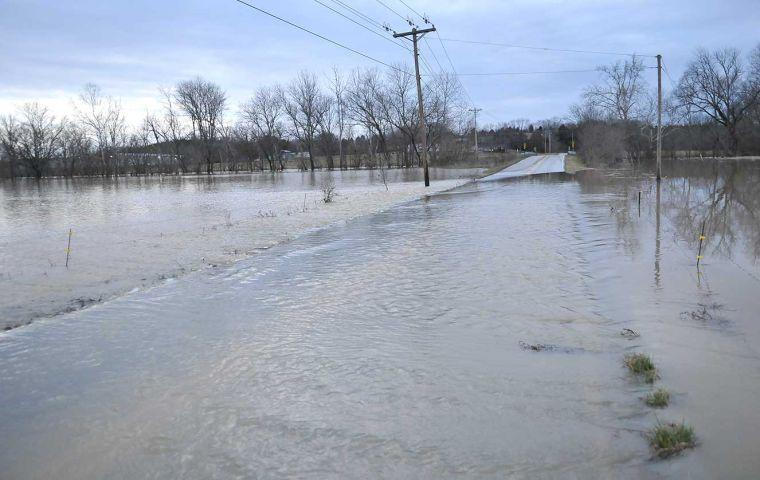
Lick Creek floods over Pottertown Road in Mosheim.

Lick Creek is a stream in Greene County, Tennessee. It is the largest creek in the county. Beginning north of Greeneville, the creek runs through the northern and western sections of the county before spilling into the Nolichucky River near the Hamblen County line. The creek is often a source of flooding, and usually rises after rounds of heavy rain. The creek is also the site of Civil War-related history. During the East Tennessee bridge burnings, a series of guerrilla operations carried out during the war by Union sympathizers, a bridge over Lick Creek was burned.

According to Tennessee regulations, the use of Lick Creek is designated as a domestic water supply, industrial water supply, and supporting fish and aquatic life. While children once played in the water in the 1920s and 1930s as a source of recreation, Lick Creek is now deeply contaminated, due in large part to poor agricultural practices. A portion of Lick Creek can be used by hunters and is presently managed by the Tennessee Wildlife Resources Agency.

== Civil War ==
In 1861, nine bridges were targeted to be burned by Union sympathizers in East Tennessee. One of the bridges was over Lick Creek, in Mohawk. The bridge was destroyed in 1861, although the East Tennessee bridge burnings were, by and large, a failed mission. Many of the Union conspirators were hanged in the aftermath. Among the conspirators, the Lick Creek bridge burners suffered the greatest number of executions. Jacob Hensie and Henry Fry were both tried and hanged in sight of the railroad at Greeneville on November 30, 1861. Alex Haun was tried and hanged at gallows just north of Knoxville on December 10. Jacob Harmon and his son, Henry, were both hanged on December 17.

== Flooding ==
Lick Creek is a significant flood threat in western and northern Greene County. In January 2013, The Greeneville Sun reported that more than 50 roads were impassable to vehicle traffic following more than five inches of rain in 48 hours. Many of the closed roads were covered by a flooding Lick Creek. Farmers across the county, especially in Mohawk, often face flooding from Lick Creek. In another example, heavy rain in late February 2019 brought historic flooding to much of the Tennessee Valley. That flooding event closed dozens of roads thanks to Lick Creek and its tributaries.

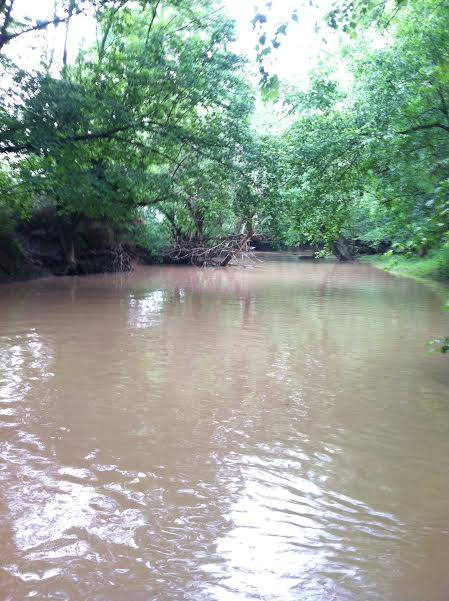
Lick Creek near Gilbreath Road.
