= William B. Carter =

Presbyterian guerrilla (1820–1902)

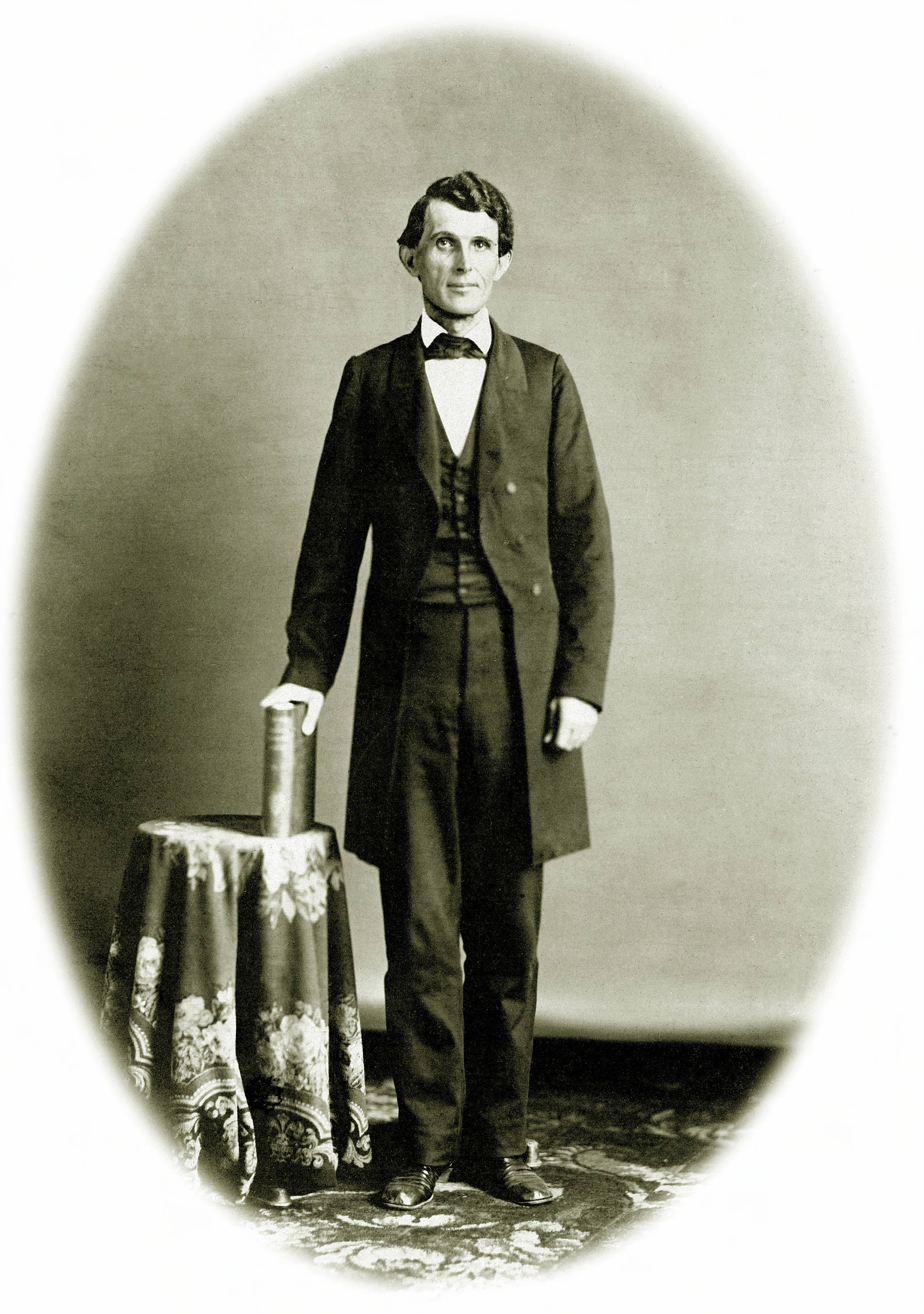
- Carter photographed c. 1850
- Born: September 11, 1820; Elizabethton, Tennessee, U.S.
- Died: July 21, 1902 (aged 81); Sullivan County, Tennessee, U.S.
- Known for: East Tennessee bridge burnings
- Movement: Abolitionism
- Spouse: 2
- Children: 3

Rev. William Blount Carter (September 11, 1820 – July 21, 1902) was a farmer, an American Presbyterian minister, and the mastermind of the East Tennessee Bridge Burnings, a guerrilla-warfare action of the American Civil War. Per one history, "Whatever else may be said about the burning of the bridges of the East Tennessee and Virginia Railroad in November, 1861, there can be no doubt whatever that the plan was conceived by the Rev. William B. Carter, of Elizabethton, Tenn., and it was through his influence that Mr. Lincoln and the War Department sanctioned it and pledged the cooperation of the Government in the execution of his plans." Carter was otherwise known as a "highly educated, cultured Christian gentleman, a minister of the Presbyterian church, and highly respected by all who knew him."

== Biography ==
William Blount Carter was born in Elizabethton, Tennessee, the second son of Alfred Moore Carter and his second wife, Evalina Belmont Parry. He was named for his father's younger brother, Whig Congressman William Blount Carter. Alfred ran an ironworks and was "circuit court clerk for Carter County, serving from 1810–1836." In 1819, Alfred built a home in Elizabethton. The house remained in the hands of his direct descendants, including Rev. W. B. Carter, until 2002. Carter's brothers Samuel Perry "Powhatan" Carter and James P. T. Carter were also Southern Unionists, both of whom became officers of the Union Army. There is a historical marker out front of the Alfred Moore Carter House in Elizabethton denoting it as a home of Samuel P. Carter.

Carter attended Washington College and Princeton Theological Seminary. He pastored Rogersville Presbyterian Church in Rogersville, Tennessee until 1846 "when his health compelled him to be a farmer at Elizabethton." He was reportedly "always anti-slavery in his views and, it has been said, voted for Fairmont [sic] in 1856 and Lincoln in 1860." He apparently returned to preaching when the Civil War broke out because he "felt that being a pastor was a good cover, so...conducted services on Sunday for local churches and Confederate troops, while organizing a group of people to burn railroad bridges."

He took the stump for the union in 1861, and the thunders of his invectives against secession and disunion were wonderful pieces of oratory; and did much to strengthen the cause of the Union, and during the great war that followed, Mr. Carter was a staunch supporter of the government, and history records that he was largely, if not primarily, instrumental in planning for the destruction of the railroad bridges in 1862.

— Knoxville Journal and Tribune, 1902

In 1862, Carter's wife, along with the wives of Andrew Johnson, Parson Brownlow, and Horace Maynard were all ordered to evacuate Confederate-occupied Tennessee by Confederate commander E. Kirby Smith.

He was a delegate to the 1870 Tennessee Constitutional Convention and "was a strong candidate for president of that body against General John C. Brown."

According to a 1928 history, "His collection of books...was in his time, one of the finest private libraries in the South, embracing many classical works in Hebrew, Greek, and Latin." In old age, Carter struggled with vision loss and endured a long physical decline. He was married twice and had three children with his second wife. Carter died at the home of his son, W. E. Carter, at Thomas' Bridge in Sullivan County. His funeral was "largely attended," and he was buried at the Carter family cemetery in Elizabethton.

== See also ==
- Daniel Stover
- Carter family of Tennessee
