= James Alex Baggett =

American historian (1932–2024)

- Born: February 2, 1932; Columbus, Georgia, U.S.
- Died: November 29, 2024 (aged 92)
- Occupations: Historian, Author
- Notable work: The Scalawags: Southern Dissenters in the Civil War and Reconstruction
- Spouse: Lillian Faulkner Baggett

James Alex Baggett (February 2, 1932 – November 29, 2024) was an American historian, author and university dean.

== Life and career ==
James Alex Baggett was born in Columbus, Georgia on February 2, 1932. He worked at Union University and wrote a book about it.

In 2003 his talk on his book about "Scalawags" was aired on C-SPAN. He discussed the book at the Jimmy Carter Presidential Library. He has written several entries for the Texas State Historical Association's Handbook.

He was married to Lillian Faulkner Baggett, a fellow educator and author.

William Harris Bragg described his book on "Scalawags" as "detailed, balanced, and convincing." Michael Perman called it groundbreaking. Union University holds an annual history research paper competition in his honor.

Baggett died on November 29, 2024, at the age of 92.

== Work ==
- The rise and fall of the Texas radicals, 1867-1883
- Bemis: Continuity and Change in a West Tennessee Cotton Mill Town (1992)
- Memories of Madison County (1993)
- So Great a Cloud of Witnesses: Union University, 1823-2000 (Union University Press, 2000) ISBN 9780970370709
- Homegrown Yankees: Tennessee's Union Cavalry in the Civil War (LSU Press, 2009) ISBN 9780807133989
- The Scalawags: Southern Dissenters in the Civil War and Reconstruction (LSU Press, 2004) ISBN 9780807130148

=== Articles ===
- "The Constitutional Union Party in Texas” Southwestern Historical Quarterly 82 (January 1979)
