= East Tennessee, Virginia and Georgia Railway =

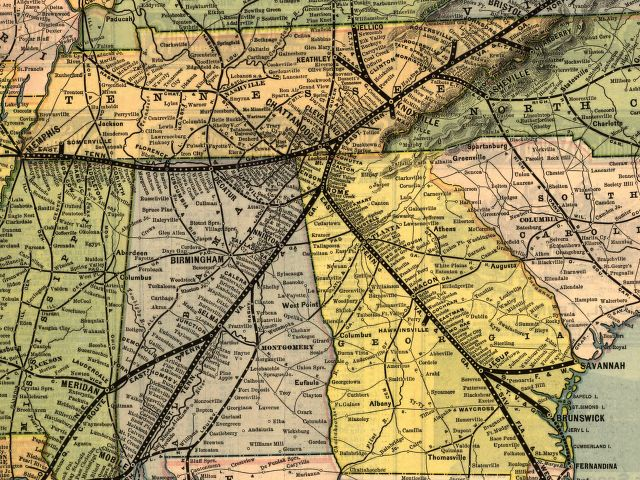
- 1890 map of the East Tennessee, Virginia and Georgia Railway

Overview
- Locale: Southeastern United States
- Dates of operation: 1869–1894
- Predecessor: East Tennessee and Virginia Railroad; East Tennessee and Georgia Railroad
- Successor: Southern Railway

Technical
- Track gauge: 4 ft 8 1/2 in (1,435 mm) standard gauge
- Previous gauge: 5 ft (1,524 mm); American Civil War era and converted to 4 ft 9 in (1,448 mm) in 1886
- Length: 66 mi (106 km)

The East Tennessee, Virginia and Georgia Railroad (reporting mark ETV&G) was a rail transport system that operated in the southeastern United States during the late 19th century. Created with the consolidation of the East Tennessee and Virginia Railroad and the East Tennessee and Georgia Railroad in 1869, the ETV&G played an important role in connecting East Tennessee and other isolated parts of Southern Appalachia with the rest of the country, and helped make Knoxville one of the region's major wholesaling centers. In 1894, the ETV&G merged with the Richmond and Danville Railroad to form the Southern Railway.

While efforts to establish a railroad in East Tennessee began in the 1830s, financial difficulties stalled construction until the late 1840s. The East Tennessee and Georgia Railroad was built between 1847 and 1859, connecting Knoxville, Tennessee, with Dalton, Georgia. The East Tennessee and Virginia Railroad was built between 1850 and 1856, connecting Knoxville with Bristol, Virginia. Knoxville financier Charles McClung McGhee formed a syndicate which purchased both lines to form the ETV&G in 1869, and largely through McGhee's efforts, the new ETV&G bought out numerous other rail lines across the region. By 1890, the ETV&G controlled over 2,500 miles (4,000 km) of tracks in five states.

== Predecessor lines ==
Throughout the first half of the 19th century, East Tennessee struggled to overcome the economic isolation created by its natural barriers, namely the Blue Ridge Mountains on the south and east and the Cumberland Plateau on the north and west. Shortly after the advent of railroads in the 1820s, the region's business leaders began discussing railroad construction as a way to relieve this isolation. In the mid-1830s, several businessmen, among them Knoxville physician J. G. M. Ramsey, planned and promoted a line connecting Cincinnati and Charleston (which would have passed through East Tennessee), but the Panic of 1837 doomed this initiative.

In 1836, a group of businessmen chartered the Hiwassee Railroad, based in Athens, Tennessee, which sought to construct a line from Knoxville southward to Dalton, Georgia, where it would join a planned extension of the Charleston and Hamburg line, providing Knoxville with a link to the Atlantic Coast. Like its competitors with the Cincinnati and Charleston, the Hiwassee ran into financial difficulties, and the Hiwassee Company nearly collapsed. The company was forced to focus on turnpike construction and iron production to survive.

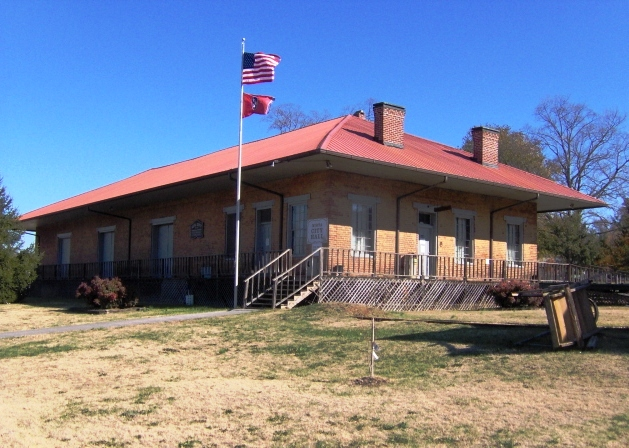
Depot in Niota, Tennessee, built in 1854 by the East Tennessee and Georgia Railroad

In 1844, the Charleston and Hamburg extension to Dalton was completed, and Knoxville and Athens businessmen again entertained the idea of building a rail line to Georgia. The Hiwassee Company was recharted in 1847 as the East Tennessee and Georgia Railroad, and with renewed support from the Tennessee state legislature, work on the line began the following year. By 1852, the line had reached Blair's Ferry (modern Loudon, Tennessee), just southwest of Knoxville. On June 22, 1855, the first train rolled into Knoxville over the East Tennessee and Georgia's tracks.

On July 4, 1855, as Knoxvillians celebrated the arrival of the railroad, track work began on the East Tennessee and Virginia Railroad, which sought to connect Knoxville with Bristol, Tennessee, where it would join existing tracks to create an unbroken rail line from New York to Memphis. Under the direction of Jonesborough physician Samuel B. Cunningham, this line reached New Market in 1856. After overcoming financial and engineering difficulties, the tracks from Knoxville to Bristol were completed on May 14, 1858, with Cunningham personally driving the last spike.

During the 1850s, virtually every major business and political leader in Knoxville was involved in railroad building. In 1852, congressmen Horace Maynard, William Montgomery Churchwell, and John H. Crozier, along with attorney Oliver Perry Temple and minister Thomas William Humes, chartered the Knoxville and Kentucky Railroad, which planned to build a line northward into Kentucky, where it would join existing lines to Cincinnati and Louisville. By the outbreak of the Civil War, however, this company had laid just nine miles of track.

== Civil War ==
The railroads in East Tennessee provided a major supply route between Virginia and the Deep South, and thus both Confederate and Union forces considered the region of vital importance. On November 8, 1861, East Tennessee Union loyalists destroyed five railroad bridges, forcing the Confederate government to invoke martial law in the region. Because the bridges were repaired rapidly, the burnings as a whole caused very little negative military impact on the Confederacy. Throughout the war, both Confederate and Union forces destroyed railroad tracks and facilities to prevent them from falling under the other's control.

== The rise and decline of the ETV&G ==
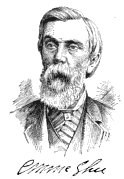
Charles McClung McGhee

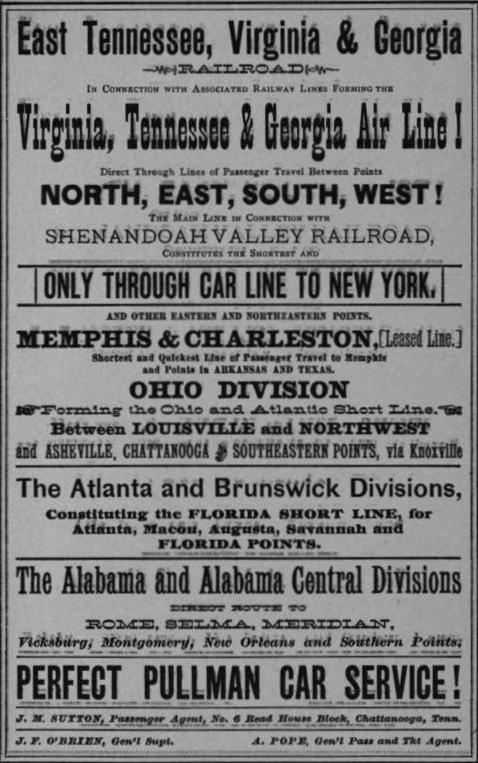
ETV&G advertisement, 1884

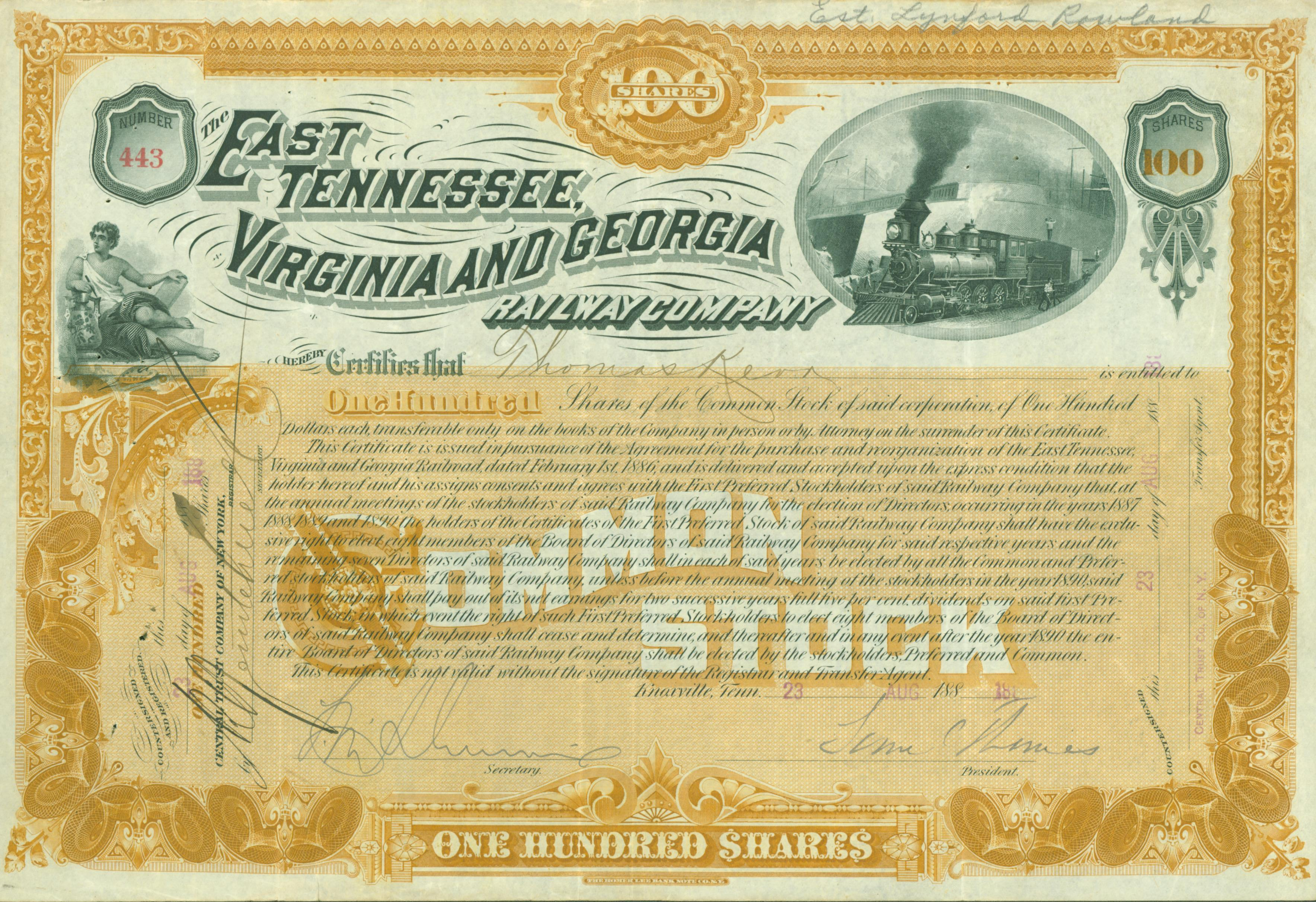
Share of the East Tennessee, Virginia and Georgia Railway Company

After the war, Knoxville businessman Charles McClung McGhee (1828–1907) and several other investors formed a syndicate which purchased both the East Tennessee and Georgia Railroad and the East Tennessee and Virginia Railroad. In 1869, the two lines were consolidated to form the East Tennessee, Virginia and Georgia Railroad, with Thomas Howard Callaway as president, and McGhee and Richard T. Wilson as agents. As a nexus between northern financiers and local interests, McGhee was able to obtain for the ETV&G large amounts of capital, and the new company rapidly expanded.

In 1869, the ETV&G bought the Knoxville and Kentucky Railroad, which had been revived after the war, and over the subsequent decade extended its tracks to the Kentucky state line at Jellico. During this same period, the ETV&G acquired the Memphis and Charleston Railroad, which connected Memphis and Chattanooga, the Georgia Southern Railroad, which connected Dalton with Rome, Georgia, and the Macon and Brunswick Railroad, which connected Macon, Georgia, with Brunswick, Georgia on the Atlantic Coast. By 1882, the ETV&G had completed tracks from Rome to Macon, connecting these last two lines.

In the early 1880s, the ETV&G managed to build a line through the rugged French Broad valley along the Tennessee-North Carolina state line to join with the Western North Carolina Railroad system, and provide a direct link from Knoxville to Asheville. The company also built a line connecting its tracks at Clinton with the Cincinnati Southern Railway tracks at Harriman. By 1890, the ETV&G controlled 2,500 miles (4,000 km) of tracks, stretching as far south as Meridian, Mississippi, and Mobile, Alabama, westward to Memphis, and eastward to Brunswick.

In the mid-1880s, overspeculation in railroad construction began to take its toll on the ETV&G's finances. In 1886, the company was reorganized as the East Tennessee, Virginia and Georgia Railway (as opposed to "Railroad"), and eventually came under the control of the Richmond Terminal Company conglomerate. After the collapse of Richmond Terminal in the early 1890s, New York financier J. P. Morgan formed the Southern Railway, which purchased the ETV&G and the Richmond and Danville Railroad, and consolidated the two in 1894. In 1982, the Southern Railway was acquired by the Norfolk Southern Corporation, which currently manages most of the former ETV&G system.

== See also ==
- Smoky Mountain Railroad
- Southern Terminal, Knoxville, Tennessee
