= John Blair (Tennessee politician) =

American politician (1790–1863)

Member of the U.S. House of Representatives from Tennessee's 1st district
- In office March 4, 1823 – March 3, 1835
- Preceded by: John Rhea
- Succeeded by: William B. Carter

Member of the Tennessee House of Representatives
- In office 1815–1817

Member of the Tennessee Senate
- In office 1817–1821

Personal details
- Born: September 13, 1790 Jonesborough, Southwest Territory
- Died: July 9, 1863 (aged 72) Jonesborough, Tennessee
- Party: Jacksonian Republican
- Education: Washington College
- Profession: lawyer; politician

John Blair (September 13, 1790 – July 9, 1863) was an American slave owner and politician who represented Tennessee in the United States House of Representatives.

== Biography ==
Blair was born in Blairs Mill near Jonesborough in the Southwest Territory, the son of John Blair, Jr., and attended Martin Academy. He graduated from Washington College in Tennessee in 1809. He studied law, was admitted to the bar in 1813, and began practicing.

== Career ==
A member of the Tennessee House of Representatives between 1815 and 1817, Blair also served as a member of the Tennessee Senate between 1817 and 1821.

Blair was elected as a Jacksonian Republican to the Eighteenth Congress and re-elected as a Jacksonian to the Nineteenth through Twenty-third Congresses. He served as a U.S. Representative from March 4, 1823, to March 3, 1835. During the Twentieth Congress, he was chairman of the U.S. House Committee on Expenditures in the State Department. He was chairman of the Committee on Expenditures in the Department of State (Twentieth Congress). He was an unsuccessful candidate for re-election to the Twenty-fourth Congress in 1834.

After retiring to private life, Blair again became a member of the Tennessee House of Representatives in 1849 and 1850. He resumed the practice of law.

== Death ==
Blair died in Jonesboro, Tennessee on July 9, 1863, at age 72 years, 330 days. He is interred at Old Cemetery in Jonesboro.

U.S. House of Representatives
Preceded by John Rhea	Member of the U.S. House of Representatives from Tennessee's 1st congressional district 1823-1835	Succeeded by William B. Carter
