= East Tennessee and Georgia Railroad =

Overview
- Locale: Tennessee
- Dates of operation: 1836–1869
- Successor: East Tennessee, Virginia and Georgia Railroad Company

Technical
- Track gauge: 5 ft (1,524 mm)

The East Tennessee and Georgia Railroad Company was incorporated under special act of Tennessee on February 19, 1836 as the Hiwassee Rail Road Company.

The company built 81.23 miles (130.73 km) of 5 ft (1,524 mm) gauge railroad line between Dalton, Georgia and Loudon, Tennessee in 1852, 28.7 miles (46.2 km) of railroad line between Loudon, Tennessee and Knoxville, Tennessee in 1855 and 29.12 miles (46.86 km) of railroad line between Chattanooga, Tennessee and Cleveland, Tennessee in 1859.

East Tennessee and Georgia Company received a large amount of funds from sale of bonds of the State of Tennessee to aid in rehabilitation of the line after the American Civil War. The State held a statutory lien on the property as security for this debt.

East Tennessee and Georgia Railroad Company was consolidated with East Tennessee and Virginia Railroad Company on November 26, 1869 to form East Tennessee, Virginia and Georgia Railroad Company.

The property eventually became part of Southern Railway Company on July 7, 1894, through its acquisition of the East Tennessee, Virginia and Georgia Railway Company.

== See also ==
- Confederate railroads in the American Civil War
