= Alfred Cate =

American politician

Alfred M. Cate

Member of the Tennessee Senate from the 8th district
- In office April 3, 1865 – October 4, 1869
- Preceded by: John A. Minnis
- Succeeded by: Abel A. Pearson

Personal details
- Born: December 20, 1822 Jefferson County, Tennessee, U.S.
- Died: September 13, 1871 (aged 48) Ooltewah, Tennessee, U.S.
- Party: Radical Republican
- Spouse: Louisa Walker (m. 1843)
- Occupation: Farmer

Military service
- Branch/service: United States Army
- Years of service: 1862–1865
- Rank: Captain
- Unit: Company G, 6th Tennessee Infantry
- Battles/wars: American Civil War

Alfred Madison Cate (December 12, 1822 – September 13, 1871) was an American politician, soldier and farmer who served two terms in the Tennessee Senate from 1865 to 1869. A Radical Republican, he generally supported the policies of Governor William G. Brownlow, including ratification of the Fourteenth Amendment to the U.S. Constitution. He served as chairman of the Republican State Central Committee in the late 1860s.

Cate remained loyal to the Union during the Civil War. He was a delegate to the pro-Union East Tennessee Convention in 1861, and was a key organizer of the East Tennessee bridge burnings later that year. He fought for the Union Army during the war, eventually rising to the rank of captain.

== Early life ==
Cate was born in Jefferson County, Tennessee, the son of Elijah Cate, a farmer, and Nellie (Davis) Cate. When he was still very young, his parents moved to McMinn County, where they established a large plantation in the Mouse Creek Valley near Niota. By 1850, Alfred had married and moved to Ooltewah, Tennessee, in Hamilton County, where he engaged in farming.

== Civil War ==
During the secession crisis of late 1860 and early 1861, Cate remained loyal to the Union. His family was very divided over the issue, however. His father and two younger brothers supported secession, while three other brothers— William T. Cate, George O. Cate, and Thomas L. Cate— supported the Union. Alfred and his brother, George, were members of the Hamilton County delegation at the first session of the East Tennessee Convention in Knoxville in May 1861. This convention denounced secession, and would subsequently petition the Tennessee state government to allow East Tennessee to form a separate, Union-aligned state.

After Confederate troops occupied East Tennessee in August 1861, William B. Carter, a staunch Unionist from Carter County, organized a conspiracy to burn nine railroad bridges across the region to make way for a Union invasion. Carter recruited Cate to burn the four bridges in the Chattanooga vicinity, namely the bridge over the Hiwassee River near Charleston, two bridges over Chickamauga Creek outside Chattanooga, and the bridge over the Tennessee River near Bridgeport, Alabama. Cate in turn recruited R.B. Rogan and James Keener to burn the Bridgeport bridge and entrusted the Chickamauga Creek bridges to William T. Cate and W.H. Crowder. Considering the Hiwassee bridge the most dangerous due to its location near a populated area (increasing the risk of getting caught), he decided to personally oversee its destruction. He was aided by Thomas L. Cate, Jesse Cleveland and Adam Thomas.

The bridge burners executed their plan on the night of November 8, 1861. Rogan and Keener found the Bridgeport bridge too heavily guarded by Confederate troops, and abandoned their attempt to burn it. William Cate and W.H. Crowder, however, managed to burn the two Chickamauga Creek bridges (which were relatively close to one another, though on different rail lines). Alfred Cate and his men also managed to destroy the Hiwassee bridge and escape undetected. Cate and the southeastern Tennesseans thus accounted for three of the five bridges destroyed that night. Unbeknownst to the bridge burners, however, the Union Army had decided against an immediate invasion of the region, and Confederate authorities launched a crackdown against the region's Unionists in the weeks following the bridge-burnings.

Though not suspected of being a bridge-burner, Cate's reputation as a Unionist nevertheless made him a target of the Confederate crackdown. Under threat of arrest, Cate left home for Kentucky on November 14, 1861. He briefly linked up with a group headed by fellow Hamilton County Unionist William J. Clift, but with more than a thousand Confederate troops in pursuit, this group disbanded. After a 300-mile (480 km) journey in which he frequently hid out in caves to avoid capture, Cate arrived in Somerset, Kentucky, in early January 1862.

Cate initially joined the 1st Tennessee Brigade, commanded by James G. Spears, with the rank of lieutenant. During the Summer of 1862, he led a raid near Jonesville, Virginia, that captured several horses, wagons, and supplies, and took several Confederate troops prisoner. In September 1862, Cate was promoted to captain and placed in charge of the brigade's commissary. He accompanied the 1st Tennessee on its invasion of Middle Tennessee in late 1862, and was present at the Battle of Stones River. He later took part several battles in the Chattanooga vicinity, including Marietta, Lost Mountain, and Kennesaw Mountain. In June 1864, Cate was appointed captain of Company G of the 6th Regiment Tennessee Volunteer Infantry, commanded by General Joseph A. Cooper. He resigned his commission just two months later, however.

After the Union Army had secured control of East Tennessee in April 1864, the East Tennessee Convention reconvened in Knoxville. Cate attended this meeting as a member of the Hamilton County delegation. He and the rest of the Hamilton delegation joined Governor Andrew Johnson and in calling for "immediate and unconditional emancipation." There was still substantial opposition to emancipation at the convention, however, and after four days of infighting, the Convention adjourned without taking any action.

== State legislature ==
During the reorganization of the state government in 1865, Cate was elected to the Tennessee Senate seat for the Eighth district, which included the counties of Hamilton, Marion, Rhea, Bledsoe, Bradley, and Sequatchie. Cate aligned with the Radical Republicans, supporters of Governor William G. Brownlow who sought retribution against ex-Confederates and civil rights for freed slaves. This legislative session quickly ratified the Thirteenth Amendment to the U.S. Constitution, and passed a controversial measure giving Brownlow unprecedented control over state elections. In July 1866, Cate was one of fourteen state senators who voted to ratify the Fourteenth Amendment, which extended civil rights to African Americans.

Cate was reelected to a second term in 1867. He was also elected chairman of the Republican State Central Committee, which coordinated party strategy and nominated candidates for elections. During the Summer of 1868, Cate angered the party's Radical wing when he voted against two contentious bills Brownlow had proposed to quell rising Ku Klux Klan violence. One bill imposed stiff penalties on anyone who aided the Klan or interfered with the election process, while the other empowered Governor Brownlow to call the state militia into service and declare martial law (with the consent of officials in the affected counties). Some leaders opposed to the bill felt that fears over Klan violence were exaggerated, while others were worried the bills would merely bring more bloodshed to the state.

During Cate's second term, he became embroiled in the conflict between Congressman William B. Stokes, leader of the party's Radical wing, and Speaker of the Tennessee Senate Dewitt Clinton Senter, the leader of the party's moderate wing. In October 1868, Cate, at the urging of Stokes, motioned to have Senter expelled from the state senate, based on a clause in the Fourteenth Amendment that barred anyone who had served in the Confederate government from serving in public office. This move stunned both Radicals and moderates, and the motion was promptly tabled (Senter had served in the state legislature in 1861 after Tennessee had joined the Confederacy, though he was generally still considered a Unionist). Cate and Stokes were assailed for this move in subsequent months.

In May 1869, Cate chaired a chaotic meeting of the Republican state committee in Nashville. Although Senter had become governor following Brownlow's resignation earlier in the year, Radicals, including Cate, supported Stokes as the party's gubernatorial nominee in elections slated for that August. When Senter's supporters tried to have Knoxville minister Thomas H. Pearne installed as chairman, Cate used a parliamentary maneuver to block the motion, sparking an angry debate that lasted throughout the day. When the committee reconvened on the following day, both Cate and Pearne stood at the chairman's desk, each attempting to act as chairman. Several scuffles broke out, and Nashville police had to intervene at one point to prevent a gunfight.

Failing to agree on a candidate, Radicals and moderates held separate meetings to nominate their own tickets. The Senter ticket dominated the August elections, however, effectively ending Radical control of the state government.

== Later life and family ==
Following his second term, Cate returned to his farm in Ooltewah, and he remained only marginally active in state party politics. He died of "congestive chills" at his home on the night of September 13, 1871.

Cate and his wife, Louisa Jackson, had seven children. His brother, William T. Cate, served as sheriff of Hamilton County, and was killed in a gun battle in 1882. A nephew, Gus Cate, served in the state legislature in the 1880s. The home of Cate's father, Elijah, still stands near Niota, and is listed on the National Register of Historic Places.
