= Samuel P. Carter =

U.S. Army–Navy officer (1819–1891)

Samuel Perry "Powhatan" Carter
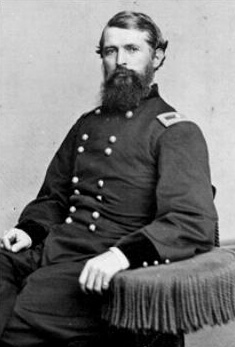
- Samuel P. Carter
- Born: August 6, 1819; Elizabethton, Tennessee, U.S.
- Died: May 26, 1891 (aged 71); Washington, D.C., U.S.
- Burial place: Oak Hill Cemetery; Georgetown, Washington, D.C., U.S.
- Military career
- Allegiance: United States of America; Union
- Branch: United States Navy; United States Army
- Service years: 1840–1861, 1865–1881 (USN); 1861–1865 (USA)
- Rank: Brevet Major General (USA) Rear Admiral (USN)
- Conflicts: Mexican–American War; Second Opium War; American Civil War
- Other work: Asst. Professor of Mathematics, United States Naval Academy

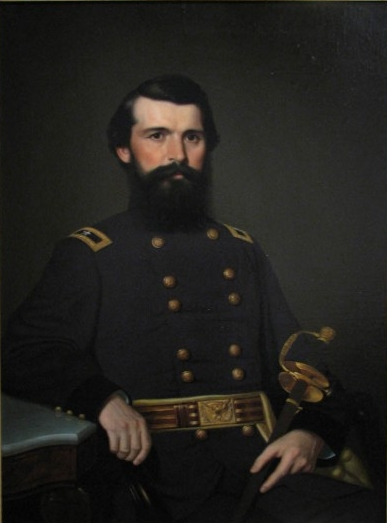
Portrait of Samuel Perry Carter, by Samuel M. Shaver

Samuel Perry "Powhatan" Carter (August 6, 1819 – May 26, 1891) was a United States naval officer who served in the Union Army as a brigadier general of volunteers during the American Civil War and became a rear admiral in the postwar United States Navy. He received a nomination for appointment to the grade of brevet major general on January 13, 1866, two days before he was mustered out of the volunteers, to rank from the omnibus date of March 13, 1865. The nomination was confirmed by the United States Senate on March 12, 1866. He was the first and thus far only United States officer to have been commissioned both a general officer and a Naval flag officer.

== Early life and career ==
Carter was born in Elizabethton, Tennessee, the eldest son of Alfred Moore Carter, a direct descendant of the early settlers for whom Carter County is named. His mother was Evalina Belmont Perry. Although later known as Samuel Powhatan Carter, Samuel's given middle name was Perry. He had two brothers, William Blount Carter and James Patton Taylor Carter. Samuel Carter attended the Duffield Academy in Elizabethton, Washington College in Limestone (1837 graduate), and Princeton University before enlisting in the U.S. Navy in February 1840.

Serving as a midshipman, Carter's five years of service included duty in the Pacific and Great Lakes region before transferring to the United States Naval Academy. He graduated in the class of 1846, later seeing action during the Mexican–American War aboard the USS Ohio at the Battle of Veracruz.

Stationed at the United States Naval Observatory for several years following the war, Carter became an assistant professor of mathematics at the United States Naval Academy for three years, from 1850 to 1853. After another tour of duty with the Pacific and Brazil Squadrons, he served in various duties before winning promotion to lieutenant in April 1855. The following year, Carter was present aboard the USS San Jacinto during the bombardment of Chinese coastal fortifications before returning to the United States to be appointed to the staff at the U.S. Naval Academy, remaining at this tour of duty until 1860.

== Civil War ==
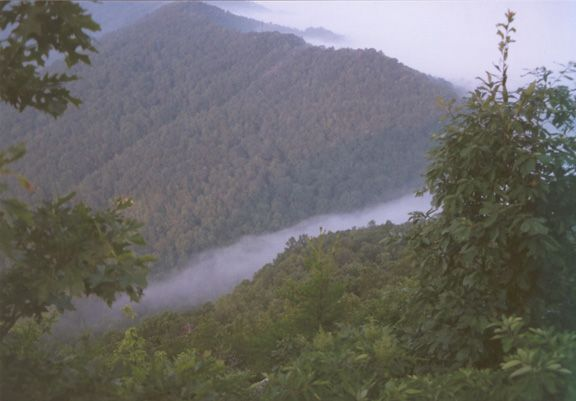
A foggy morning at the Pinnacle at Cumberland Gap National Historic Park.

In early 1861, after receiving a letter from Carter assuring his loyalty to the Union should a civil war break out, Tennessee senator Andrew Johnson used his influence in the War Department for Carter to be detached from the Navy. Carter was ordered to organize and enlist Unionists within his native East Tennessee, where the majority of the population remained loyal. When Confederate occupation of the region prevented this, Carter raised a brigade of infantry from among the hundreds of East Tennesseans fleeing to Kentucky. During this time, he adopted "Powhatan" as a code name when corresponding secretly with Unionists who remained behind Confederate lines. Carter's younger brother, William B. Carter (1820–1902), planned and coordinated the East Tennessee bridge-burning conspiracy in late 1861.

Carter was appointed a brigadier general of volunteers without resigning from the Navy. President Lincoln nominated Carter for appointment as a brigadier general on March 20, 1862; the appointment was confirmed by the United States Senate on May 1, 1862, to rank from May 1, 1862, and the appointment date was May 2, 1862. He led an infantry brigade at the Battle of Mill Springs on January 19, 1862, and participated in operations under Brigadier General George W. Morgan that resulted in the occupation of Cumberland Gap on June 17, 1862. Carter's hope that Morgan would then invade and occupy East Tennessee was dashed when Morgan was forced to retreat in the face of a Confederate move into Kentucky—Braxton Bragg's Perryville Campaign.

Following Bragg's defeat and retreat to Middle Tennessee, Carter successfully lobbied his superiors for permission to conduct a raid into East Tennessee. Carter's plan was to cripple the vital East Tennessee and Virginia Railroad. This would support the operations of Major General William S. Rosecrans in Middle Tennessee and test the route through the mountains as a potential path of invasion. The result was the first long-range, large-scale Federal cavalry raid of the war. With a force of just under 1,000 men, Carter moved through the rugged mountains of eastern Kentucky and Tennessee during the last week of 1862. On December 30, he destroyed railroad and wagon bridges at both Union and Carter's Depot (present day Watauga), Tennessee. He repeatedly defeated the Confederate forces in his path, captured a moving train, destroyed tens of thousands of dollars of military stores, and returned safely to Kentucky on January 2, 1863. Plans to follow the raid with an invasion and occupation of East Tennessee, a move urged by Lincoln, were canceled when Carter reported the route impracticable for a large force.

In July 1863, Carter was placed in command of the XXIII Corps cavalry division and continued campaigning across Tennessee throughout the year, engaging Confederate forces during the Battle of Blue Springs of the Knoxville Campaign.

By 1865, Carter was in North Carolina and commanding the left wing of the Union forces at the Battle of Wyse Fork. Carter briefly commanded the XXIII Corps before being mustered out of volunteer service on January 15, 1866. Carter was nominated for appointment to the grade of brevet major general of volunteers by President Andrew Johnson on January 13, 1866, to rank from March 13, 1865, and the appointment was confirmed by the United States Senate on March 12, 1866.

While Carter was serving in the Union Army, the U.S. Navy promoted him to lieutenant commander in 1863, then to commander in 1865.

== Postwar career ==
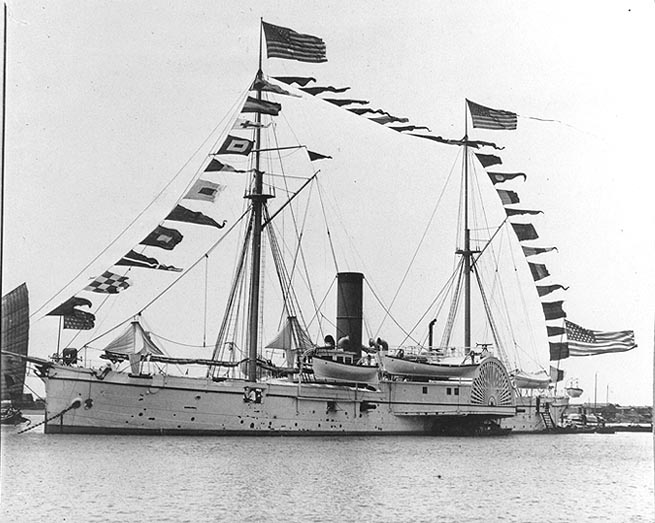
USS Monocacy (1864)

Returning to naval service, Carter was appointed a commander due to his military record during the Civil War. Rejoining the Pacific Squadron, he commanded the USS Monocacy. He was promoted to captain in October 1870, served as commandant of midshipmen in the Naval Academy until 1873, and returned to sea duty in Europe before being named a member of the Lighthouse Board in 1877.

After the Civil War, Carter became a Veteran Companion of the Military Order of the Loyal Legion of the United States (MOLLUS), a military society composed of Union officers and their descendants.

In 1877, Carter married Martha Custis Williams (1827–1899), a descendant of Martha Custis Washington. Promoted to commodore in November 1878, Carter retired in August 1881, shortly before being promoted to rear admiral on the retired list in May 1882. He lived in retirement until his death in Washington, D.C. Carter is buried in the Oak Hill Cemetery.

A Tennessee Historical Marker located on West Elk Avenue in front of the S. P. Carter home in downtown Elizabethton, Tennessee, commemorates his life and naval career.

== Dates of rank ==
- Midshipman – 14 February 1840
- Passed Midshipman – 11 July 1846
- Master – 12 September 1854
- Lieutenant – 18 April 1855
- Brigadier General, Volunteer Army – 1 May 1862
- Lieutenant Commander – 16 July 1862
- Brevet Major General – Volunteer Army – 13 March 1865; Date of confirmation 12 March 1866.
- Commander – 25 June 1865
- Mustered out of Volunteer Army – 15 January 1866
- Captain – 28 October 1870
- Commodore – 13 November 1878
- Retired List – 6 August 1881
- Rear Admiral on Retired List – 16 May 1882

== See also ==
- List of American Civil War generals (Union)
- Carter family of Tennessee
