= Southern Unionist =

White Southerners opposed to secession and the American Civil War

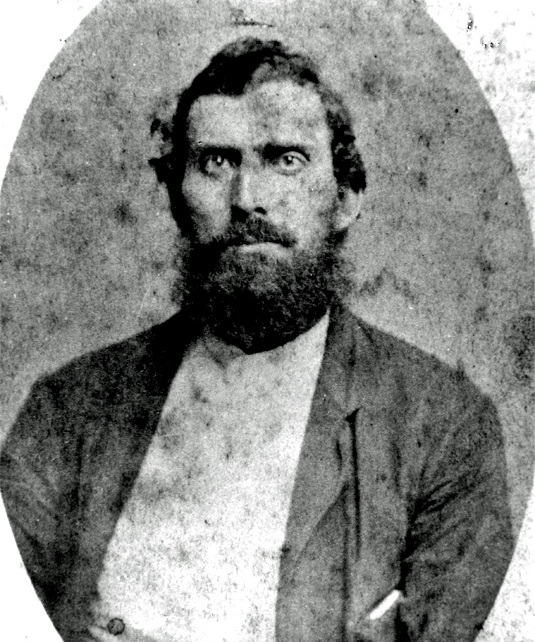
Newton Knight (Mississippi), leader of the Knight Company and one of the founders of the Free State of Jones.

In the United States, Southern Unionists were white Southerners living in the Confederate States of America and the Southern Border States that were opposed to secession. Many fought for the Union during the Civil War. These people are also referred to as Southern Loyalists, Union Loyalists, or Lincoln's Loyalists. Pro-Confederates in the South derided them as "Tories" (in reference to the pro-Crown Loyalists of the American Revolution). During Reconstruction, these terms were replaced by "scalawag" (or "scallywag"), which covered all Southern whites who supported the Republican Party.

Tennessee (especially East Tennessee), Kentucky, Maryland, Missouri, Delaware, North Carolina, and Virginia (which included West Virginia at that time) were home to the largest populations of Unionists. Other (primarily Appalachian) areas with significant Unionist influence included North Alabama, North Georgia, Western North Carolina, the Texas Hill Country, northern Loudoun County in Virginia, North Mississippi, North Texas, the Arkansas Ozarks, and the Boston Mountains in Arkansas. These areas provided thousands of volunteers for Union military service. Western North Carolinians, for example, formed their own loyalist infantry, cavalry, and artillery regiments, while West Virginians formed a new Union state admitted in 1863.

== Description ==
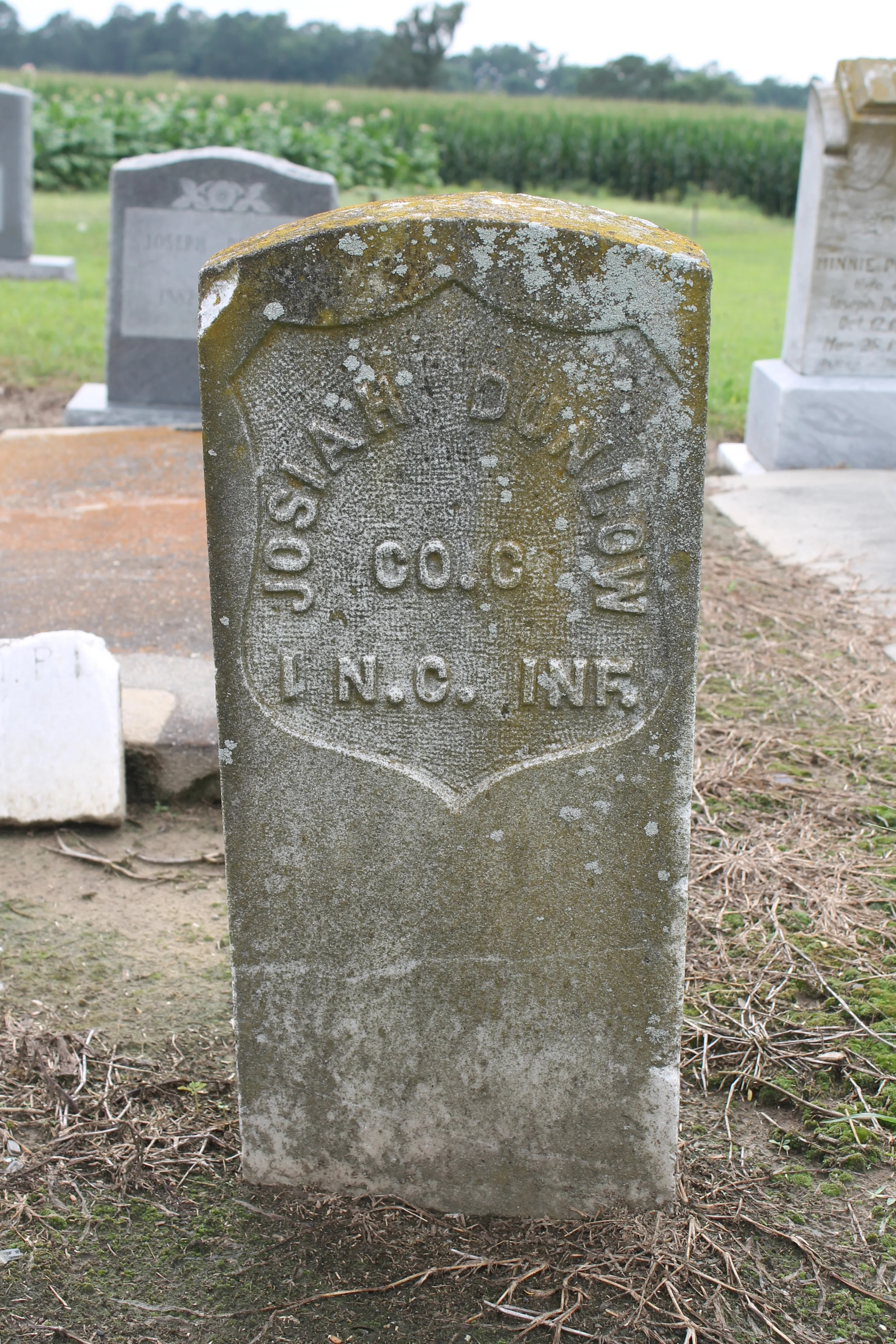
Josiah Dunlow - 1st North Carolina Union Volunteers, buried near Askewville, North Carolina

The term Southern Unionist, and its variations, incorporate a spectrum of beliefs and actions. Some, such as Texas governor Sam Houston, were vocal in their support of Southern interests, but believed that those interests could best be maintained by remaining in the Union as it existed. Some Unionists initially opposed secession (especially in the states of Tennessee, North Carolina, and Virginia), but after it came, served in the Confederate armies, or supported the Confederacy in other ways, usually out of a sense of duty to their states. Others refused to fight, went or stayed north to enlist in the Union Army, forming dedicated Unionist units, or launched insurgencies behind Confederate lines. Some remained in the South and tried to stay neutral. The term could also be used for any Southerner who worked with the Republican Party or Union government in any capacity after the war ended in 1865.

A study of Southern Unionists in Alabama who continued to support the Union during the war found that they were typically "old fashioned" or conservative "Jackson" Democrats, or former Whigs, who viewed the federal government as worthy of defending because it had provided economic and political security. They saw secession as dangerous, illegitimate, and contrary to the intentions of the Founding Fathers, and believed that the Confederacy could not improve on the United States government. The desire for security was a motivation for Unionist slaveholders, who correctly predicted that secession would entail a war that the South could not win, ultimately leading to the loss of their slaves. Others saw the end of slavery as preferable to the end of the Union, or saw slavery as doomed in the long run and preferred to see it go peacefully and be compensated for their loss than have abolition imposed by a Northern army. The Southern ideals of honor, family, and duty were as important to Unionists as to their pro-secession neighbors. They believed, however, that rebelling against the United States, which many of their ancestors had fought for in 1776 and 1812, was the unmanly and dishonorable act.

=== Baggett study ===
In 2003, historian James Alex Baggett profiled more than 1,400 Southern political activists (742 Southern Unionists, and 666 Redeemers who eventually replaced them) in three regions (the Upper South, the Southeast, and the Southwest). He coded them as follows:

Score	Activity
1	Breckinridge supporter in 1860 election
2	Bell or Douglas supporter in 1860 election
3	1860–61 opponent of secession
4	Passive wartime unionist
5	Peace party advocate
6	Active wartime unionist
7	Postwar National Union Party supporter

Baggett claimed that each activist's score was roughly proportional to the probability that the activist was a Southern Unionist. Baggett further investigated the lives of those Southern Unionists before, during, and after the war, with respect to birthplace, occupation, value of estate, slave ownership, education, party activity, stand on secession, war politics, and postwar politics.

== History ==
Before the war there was widespread belief in the North that the states that had not yet seceded might be persuaded to stay within the Union. This idea was predicated on the fact that many believed that the newly elected President Lincoln would declare a relaxed policy toward the South that would ease tensions. Given the fact that there were a good number of Southern Unionists known to be found in the South it was hoped that this deliberate policy of non-provocation would subvert extremists from irreversible action. Admirable though their sentiments might have been, the claims of these Northerners were greatly embellished. In fact, there were fewer Unionists in the South than many Northerners believed, and they tended to be concentrated in areas such as northwest Virginia, East Tennessee, and parts of North Carolina where slave owners and slaves themselves were few. Furthermore, in the states that had already seceded, irreversible action had already taken place; federal buildings, mints, and courthouses had been seized.

Many Southern soldiers remained loyal when their states seceded. During the war, many Southern Unionists went North and joined the Union armies. Others joined when Union armies entered their hometowns in Tennessee, Virginia, Arkansas, Louisiana, and elsewhere. Around 100,000 Southern Unionists served in the Union Army during the Civil War, with every Southern state except South Carolina raising official organizations of white troops. Though no regiments of Southern Unionists were formed in South Carolina due to a smaller unionist presence, the Upstate region of the state would be a haven for Confederate Army deserters and resisters, as they used the Upstate topography and traditional community relations to resist service in the Confederate ranks.

State	White soldiers serving in the Union Army (other branches unlisted)
Alabama	2,700
Arkansas	9,000
Florida	1,000
Georgia	2,500
Louisiana	5,000-10,000
Mississippi	545
North Carolina	10,000
Tennessee	31,000
Texas	2,000
Virginia and West Virginia	21,000–23,000

In Virginia's Shenandoah Valley, Mennonites, members of the Church of the Brethren, and other Unionists operated a network that hid Confederate draft resisters and deserters and guided them to Union-held territory. Participants referred to it as an underground railroad in their testimony before the Southern Claims Commission after the war, although no connection was found between this network and the Underground Railroad that aided people escaping enslavement. Refugees waited at farms and homes known as "depots" for guides called "pilots" to lead them over the mountains, usually to New Creek, West Virginia, where they could board trains to the north. Rockingham County, Virginia hosted more than 30 such depots. Unionists in the Shenandoah Valley faced violent reprisals, with more than a dozen killings in Rockingham County alone. Brethren leader John Kline, who spoke out in opposition to secession and the war, was shot and killed by Confederate militiamen in June 1864.

The Southern Unionists were referred to in Henry Clay Work's song "Marching Through Georgia":

Yes and there were Union men who wept with joyful tears,
When they saw the honored flag they had not seen for years;
Hardly could they be restrained from breaking forth in cheers,
While we were marching through Georgia.

Southern Unionists were extensively used as anti-guerrilla forces and as occupation troops in areas of the Confederacy occupied by the Union. Ulysses S. Grant noted:

We had many regiments of brave and loyal men who volunteered under great difficulty from the twelve million belonging to the South.

== See also ==
- List of Southern Unionists
- East Tennessee Convention – Political assembly
- Wheeling Convention – 1861 secession movement of West Virginia from Virginia
- Nickajack – Region in East Tennessee and northern Alabama
- Copperhead, a Northerner sympathetic to the Confederacy
