= East Tennessee and Virginia Railroad =

Overview
- Locale: Tennessee
- Dates of operation: 1850–1869
- Successor: East Tennessee, Virginia and Georgia Railroad Company

Technical
- Track gauge: 5 ft (1,524 mm)

The East Tennessee and Virginia Railroad Company was incorporated under a special act of Tennessee on January 27, 1848.

The company built 130.7 miles (210.3 km) of 5 ft (1,524 mm) gauge railroad line between Knoxville, Tennessee and Bristol, Virginia between 1850 and 1856.

East Tennessee and Virginia Railroad Company received a large amount of funds from the sale of bonds of the State of Tennessee to aid in the rehabilitation of the line after the American Civil War. The State held a statutory lien on the company's property as security for this debt.

East Tennessee and Virginia Railroad Company was consolidated with East Tennessee and Georgia Railroad Company, originally Hiwassee Rail Road Company, on November 26, 1869 to form East Tennessee, Virginia and Georgia Railroad Company.

The property eventually became part of Southern Railway Company on July 7, 1894, through its acquisition of the East Tennessee, Virginia and Georgia Railway Company.

== See also ==
- Confederate railroads in the American Civil War
