= James P. T. Carter =

American military officer and politician (1822–1869)

2nd Secretary of Arizona Territory
- In office September 3, 1866 – April 14, 1869
- Nominated by: Andrew Johnson
- Preceded by: Richard Cunningham McCormick
- Succeeded by: Coles Bashford

Personal details
- Born: July 30, 1822 Carter County, Tennessee, U.S.
- Died: September 29, 1869 (aged 47) Rancho San Francisco, Sonora, Mexico
- Party: Whig/Democratic
- Spouse(s): Margaretta M. Dunn (m. 1851–1854) Margaret Letcher (m. 1856)

Military service
- Allegiance: United States; Union
- Branch/service: Union Army
- Years of service: 1861–1864
- Rank: Colonel
- Unit: 2nd Tennessee Infantry Regiment; 24th Brigade, Army of the Ohio
- Battles/wars: American Civil War: Battle of Mill Springs; First Battle of Murfreesboro

James Patton Taylor Carter (July 30, 1822 – September 28/29, 1869) was a Union army officer during the American Civil War and led the 2nd Tennessee Infantry Regiment. He was also a politician who served as Secretary of Arizona Territory from 1866 to 1869.

== Biography ==
Carter was born the youngest child of Alfred Moore and Evalina B. (Perry) Carter on July 30, 1822 in or near the town of Elizabethton in Carter County, Tennessee. His grandfather, Landon Carter, is the person for whom Carter County was named, while the county seat is named after his grandmother, Elizabeth (Maclin) Carter. His older brothers were General Samuel P. Carter and Rev. William B. Carter. Details of Carter's education have been lost, but his correspondence shows he was literate with solid language skills. His family business involved iron manufacturing, and Carter took control of the business following his father's death in 1850. Carter married Margaretta M. Dunn on August 5, 1851. The union produced a son, William A. Carter. Following the death of his first wife, he married Margaret Letcher.

=== Civil War period ===
Politically, Carter and his family were Whigs. As the American Civil War approached, Carter became an outspoken Union supporter. During an anti-secession meeting in Knoxville at the end of May 1861, he was one of five delegates representing Carter County. The next month, Carter was one of "three brave men" who escorted Andrew Johnson from Greeneville, Tennessee to Washington D.C. While they were fired upon several times during their journey through the Cumberland Gap, the group arrived safely at their destination. Shortly after his arrival in Washington, Carter left on a secret mission involving the arming of Union supporters in eastern Tennessee by the U.S. federal government.

In August 1861, Carter became a colonel in the 2nd Regiment Tennessee Volunteer Infantry. He saw action during the battles of Mill Springs and Murfreesboro as well as during the pursuit of John Hunt Morgan.

Carter became a brigade commander in the XXIII Corps on July 15, 1863. During the war he was slightly wounded and held shortly as a prisoner of war. Carter resigned on May 2, 1864, saying "I have become ... a supernumerary officer in the service of the United States" following "the capture of about three-fourths of my command". At the end of the war he found himself impoverished by the seizure of his property by Confederate forces, and in poor health.

=== Western U.S. period ===
Following the war, Carter decided to move west in a hope the change would help restore both his health and his wealth. He petitioned President Johnson to be appointed Governor of Montana Territory in January 1866. Then, as was the custom of the day, arranged for letters of recommendation to be sent to both the president and Secretary of State William H. Seward. The congressional delegates of both Kentucky and Tennessee provided support for his appointment. He did not receive the requested appointment, but was offered a position as Secretary of Arizona Territory. Carter accepted the offer and was commissioned on April 10, 1866.

Carter departed with his wife and son for Panama in June 1866. After crossing the isthmus, they took a ship to California and arrived in Prescott, Arizona Territory on September 3. He was suffering from "Panama Fever" upon his arrival at the territorial capital, but appeared to quickly recover. The 3rd Arizona Territorial Legislature convened a month after his arrival and the new secretary was responsible for swearing in the members of the House of Representatives. Following the session, the legislators thanked Carter for the "gentlemanly deportment" and "faithful manner" the Secretary demonstrated during the session.

Governor Richard Cunningham McCormick left for California on December 9, 1866. Carter accompanied McCormick part of the way, returning to Prescott in February 1867 to serve as acting governor. During his spare time, he explored northern Arizona. This included a four-to-six week trip along the Colorado River in April 1867. Carter had requested a leave of absence for the end of 1867 to settle his father-in-law's estate. This plan changed when the 4th Arizona Territorial Legislature moved the territorial capital to Tucson and Carter became responsible for overseeing the move of the territory's governmental offices. Items such as furniture and stoves were sold with the intention of purchasing replacements at the new capital location. To ensure transit of the territorial library, Carter paid $76 in freight charges from his personal funds.

Carter visited San Francisco before proceeding to Tucson. There he met his wife, who had been traveling back east. Upon his arrival in the new capital in April 1868, he was recovering from injuries sustained after being thrown from a buggy as well as "rheumatic pains". During the election for territorial delegate, Carter called for a "good Democrat" to win the position, but instead saw Governor McCormick win the office. Shortly after the results became known, Carter wrote to President Johnson asking for promotion to governor. President Johnson failed to take action on the request. Carter was left as acting governor when McCormick left the territory on December 13, 1868.

The Acting Governor soon found himself with a major problem. Under territorial law at the time, the legislature was empowered to apportion itself. In practice the apportionment had been delegated to the governor. In January 1869, Judge Henry T. Backus issued a ruling that this arrangement was unconstitutional. As a result, the legality of the territorial government was thrown into question, and some residents refused to pay their taxes. Carter called for the United States Congress, in its supervisory capacity, to pass legislation correcting the issue. While the needed legislation was passed, it did not come until after Carter left office. In the meantime, the Acting Governor failed to call for a meeting of the territorial legislature in 1869. This oversight may have been partially due to Carter experiencing another bout of health problems. He did commute the death sentence of Delore Moore who had been convicted of killing her husband.

Ulysses S. Grant replaced Andrew Johnson as President of the United States on March 4, 1869. With his friend no longer in office, Carter, who had a reputation for supporting Johnson's policies while denouncing the Republican party, expected to be quickly replaced. Coles Bashford was appointed to become the new Territorial Secretary on April 14, 1869.

Carter remained in the territory after leaving office. He had developed business interests in Tucson and owned a two-third's interest in a flour mill in Altar, Sonora. He had also been awarded a government contract for 150,000 pounds (68,000 kg) of flour for use by the U.S. Army in March 1869. He left Tucson for Mexico in July 1869. The purpose of the trip was a combination of health reasons and to look after his business enterprises in Mexico. Carter died September 28/29, 1869 at Rancho San Francisco between Caborca and Puerto Libertad, Sonora.
