= Bethesda Presbyterian Church (Russellville, Tennessee) =

Historic church in Hamblen County, Tennessee

- U.S. National Register of Historic Places
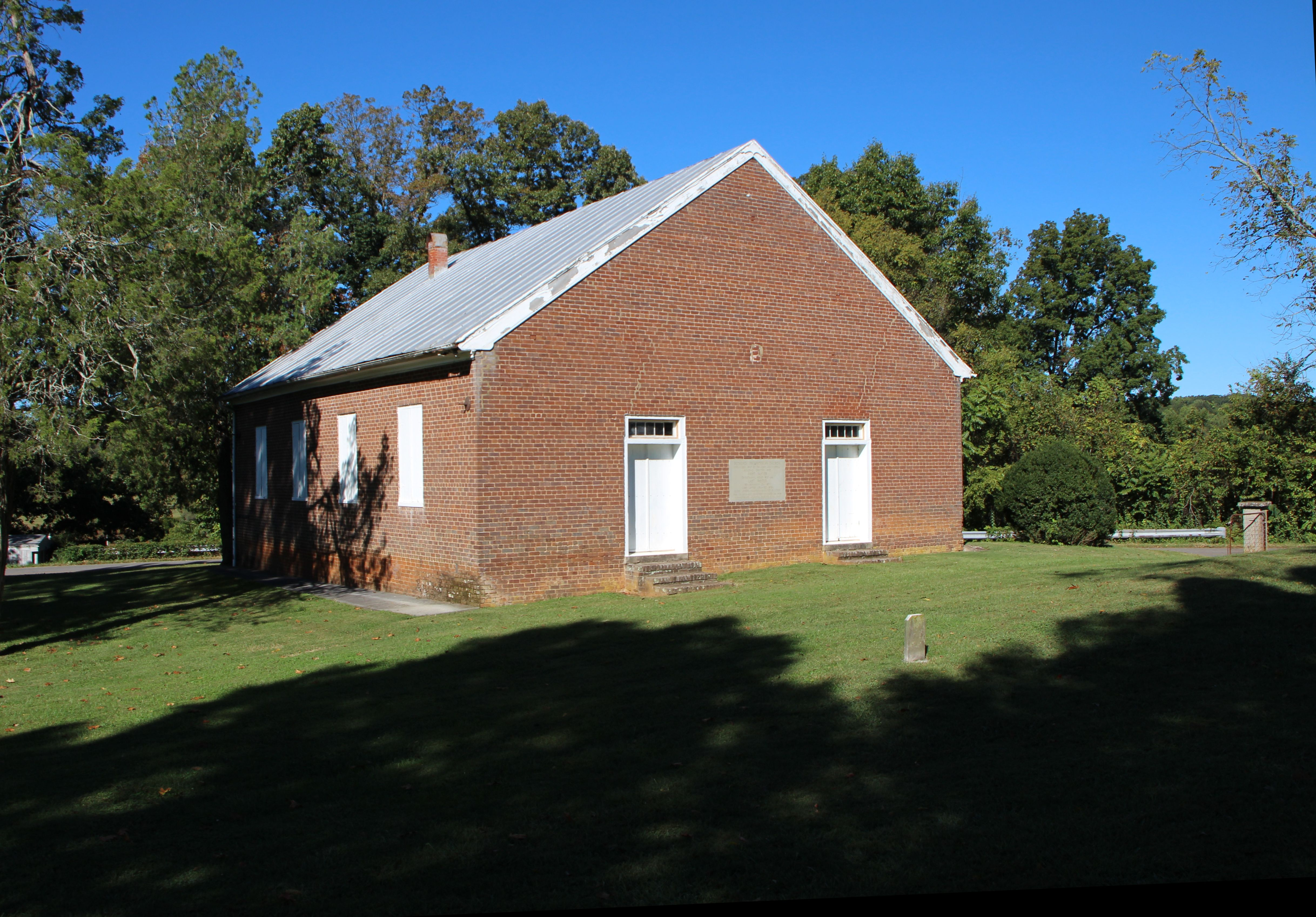

- Location within Tennessee Location within the United States
- Nearest city: Russellville, Tennessee
- Coordinates: 36°14′51″N 83°13′41″W
- Area: 5 acres (2.0 ha)
- Built: 1835
- NRHP reference No.: 73001771
- Added to NRHP: April 11, 1973

Bethesda Presbyterian Church is a historic church in Russellville, Tennessee, US, that was used as a hospital during the American Civil War. It is listed on the National Register of Historic Places.

== History ==
Bethesda Presbyterian Church was organized in 1832. The church building was completed in 1835. It is a brick building equipped with high-back wooden pews and an "ornate" wooden pulpit.

As the Civil War approached, the congregants' sympathies were divided between the Union and secessionist sides. The split led the church to suspend activity until after the hostilities ended.

Some 25,000 Confederate Army soldiers under the command of General James Longstreet arrived at the church in December 1863 to spend the winter, after the Battle of Bean's Station. They remained there until February 1864 and used the church building as a hospital. Military engagements occurred near the church in both October and November 1864. In the Battle of Morristown (also known as "Vaughn's Stampede") in October, Union forces under General Alvan C. Gillem attacked Confederate troops commanded by General John C. Vaughn, causing them to retreat to Carter's Station on the Watauga River. In the Battle of Bull's Gap (also known as “Gillem's Stampede”) in November, Confederate forces under General John C. Breckinridge and Vaughn prevailed over Gillem's troops, chasing the Union forces westward to a defensive position near Knoxville. During one of these skirmishes, a cannonball penetrated one of the church walls, causing structural damage that was repaired by reinforcing the walls with large iron rods. The Union Army used the church as a hospital for soldiers wounded in these operations. Many soldiers from both sides are interred in the church cemetery. Eighty of the wartime burials are unidentified.

Worship services resumed after the war ended, but church members could not reconcile their political differences. Confederate and Union supporters sat on different sides of the church, separated by empty pews. In 1871, one group walked out together; they then joined the Presbyterian Church of Morristown. The other group continued to worship at Bethesda Presbyterian Church until 1875, when they closed Bethesda and left to become part of the new Russellville Presbyterian Church.

== Modern status ==
The church was added to the National Register of Historic Places in 1973. The church building and its cemetery are maintained by members of a local chapter of the Sons of Confederate Veterans. In 2011, a pair of local teenagers vandalized the church and its cemetery, breaking windows and defacing gravestones. It currently has a Civil War Trails sign that signifies its usage in the American Civil War and a plaque honoring the fallen Civil War veterans.
