= Battery C =

Battery C or C battery or variation, may refer to:

== Electrochemical batteries ==
- C battery (R14 battery)
- Vacuum tube powering 'C' battery

== Military units ==
- Battery "C", 1st Illinois Light Artillery Regiment
- Battery "C", 2nd Illinois Light Artillery Regiment
- Battery "C" Kentucky Light Artillery
- Battery "C" 1st Michigan Light Artillery Regiment
- Battery C, 1st Missouri Light Artillery Regiment
- Battery C, 2nd Missouri Light Artillery Regiment
- Battery C, 1st New Jersey Light Artillery
- Battery C, 1st New York Light Artillery
- Battery C, 1st Ohio Light Artillery
- Independent Battery C, Pennsylvania Light Artillery
- Battery C, 1st Pennsylvania Light Artillery
- Battery C, 1st Rhode Island Light Artillery Regiment
- Battery C, 3rd Rhode Island Heavy Artillery
- 1st Battalion Tennessee Light Artillery, Battery "C"
- Battery C, 1st West Virginia Light Artillery Regiment
- 4th U.S. Artillery, Battery C
- 5th U.S. Artillery, Battery C

== Other uses ==
- Battery C Site, Helena, Arkansas, USA; an American Civil War site

== See also ==
- Battery (disambiguation)
- C (disambiguation)
- C cell (disambiguation)
