= 1st Battalion Tennessee Light Artillery, Battery "E" =

- Active: October 1863 to August 1, 1865
- Country: United States
- Allegiance: Union
- Branch: Artillery
- Engagements: Battle of Morristown; Battle of Bull's Gap; Stoneman's 1865 Raid

Battery E, 1st Battalion Tennessee Light Artillery was an artillery battery that served in the Union Army during the American Civil War. It originally mustered as Battery "D", 1st Tennessee Heavy Artillery, and as late as January 1864, it was referred to in reports as 1st East Tennessee Heavy Artillery.

== Service ==
The battalion was organized in Memphis, Nashville, and Knoxville, Tennessee, from June 13, 1863, through October 16, 1863, under the command of Lieutenant Colonel Robert Clay Crawford. Battery E mustered in for three years service in October 1863 under the command of Captain Henry C. Lloyd.

Battery E was attached to District of North Central Kentucky, Department of the Ohio, 1st Division, XXIII Corps, October 1863 to April 1864. District of Nashville, Tennessee, Department of the Cumberland, to May 1865. 1st Brigade, 4th Division, District of East Tennessee, to July 1865.

Battery E, 1st Battalion Tennessee Light Artillery mustered out of service at Nashville on August 1, 1865.

== Detailed service ==
Duty in District of North Central Kentucky, at Booneville, Camp Nelson, Flemmingsburg, Mt. Sterling and Paris, December 1863 to April 1864, and at Nashville and Bull's Gap, Tenn., to August 1864. Pursuit to Greenville, Tenn., August 21–23. Blue Springs August 23. Operations in eastern Tennessee August 29-September 4. Park's Gap and Greenville September 4. Death of Gen. J. H. Morgan, Blue Springs September 6. Carter's Station September 30-October 1. Operations in eastern Tennessee October 10–28. Clinch Valley, near Sneedsville, October 21. Mossy Creek and Panther Springs October 27. Morristown and Russellville October 28. Operations against Breckenridge November 4–17. Bull's Gap November 11–13. Morristown November 13. Russellville November 14. Strawberry Plains November 16–17. Duty in eastern Tennessee until March 1865. Stoneman's Expedition from eastern Tennessee into southwest Virginia and western North Carolina March 21-April 25, 1865. Wytheville April 6. Martinsville April 8. Shallow Ford and near Mocksville April 11. Saulsbury April 12. Catawba River April 17. Catawba River, near Morganstown, April 20. Howard's Gap and Blue Ridge Mountains April 22. Near Hendersonville April 23. Duty in eastern Tennessee until June. Ordered to Nashville June 25.

== Commanders ==
- Captain Henry C. Lloyd
- Captain Henry C. Kelly
- Captain William J. Patterson

== See also ==
- List of Tennessee Civil War units
- Tennessee in the Civil War
