= 1st Battalion Tennessee Light Artillery, Battery "G" =

- Active: October 1863 to January 26, 1865
- Country: United States
- Allegiance: Union
- Branch: Artillery

Battery G, 1st Battalion Tennessee Light Artillery was an artillery battery that served in the Union Army during the American Civil War.

== Service ==
The battalion was organized in Memphis, Nashville, and Knoxville, Tennessee, from June 13, 1863, through October 16, 1863, under the command of Lieutenant Colonel Robert Clay Crawford.

Battery G was attached to Garrison Artillery, Nashville, Tennessee. Assigned to "Governor's Guard" in August 1864, under the overall command of Brig. Gen. Alvan Cullem Gillem. Reported at Bull's Gap, Tennessee, August 3, 1864.

Battery G, 1st Battalion Tennessee Light Artillery presumably ceased to exist after January 26, 1865, when the battery's men were consolidated with Battery E, 1st Battalion Tennessee Light Artillery.

== Commanders ==
- Captain Henry C. Kelly
- Lieutenant Jeremiah H. Crane

== See also ==
- List of Tennessee Civil War units
- Tennessee in the Civil War
