= 1st Battalion Tennessee Light Artillery, Battery "F" =

- Active: October 1863 to April 13, 1864
- Country: United States
- Allegiance: Union
- Branch: Artillery

Battery F, 1st Battalion Tennessee Light Artillery was an artillery battery that served in the Union Army during the American Civil War.

== Service ==
The battalion was organized in Memphis, Nashville, and Knoxville, Tennessee, from June 13, 1863, through October 16, 1863, under the command of Lieutenant Colonel Robert Clay Crawford.

Battery F was attached to 1st Brigade, 4th Division, XXIII Corps, Department of the Ohio.

Battery F, 1st Battalion Tennessee Light Artillery presumably ceased to exist after April 13, 1864, when the battery's men were transferred to Battery A, 1st Battalion Tennessee Light Artillery.

== See also ==
- List of Tennessee Civil War units
- Tennessee in the Civil War
