= 13th Tennessee Cavalry Regiment =

- Active: October 28, 1863, to September 5, 1865
- Country: United States
- Allegiance: Union
- Branch: Cavalry
- Engagements: Battle of Morristown; Battle of Bull's Gap; Second Battle of Saltville; Battle of Marion

The 13th Tennessee Cavalry Regiment was a cavalry regiment that served in the Union Army during the American Civil War. The regiment was originally designated 12th Tennessee Volunteer Cavalry, but was changed by order of Governor Andrew Johnson on December 31, 1863.

== Service ==
The 13th Tennessee Cavalry was organized at Strawberry Plains, Gallatin and Nashville, Tennessee, and mustered in for a three-year enlistment under the command of Colonel John K. Miller. Nine companies mustered in at Strawberry Plains on October 28 and November 8, 1863.

The regiment was attached to District of Columbus, Kentucky, 6th Division, XVI Corps, Department of the Tennessee, to November 1863. District of North Central Kentucky, Department of the Ohio, to January 1864. District of Nashville, Tennessee, Department of the Cumberland, to April 1864. 3rd Brigade, 4th Division, Cavalry Corps, Army of the Cumberland, to October 1864. 3rd Brigade, 4th Division, Cavalry Corps, Military Division Mississippi, November 1864. District of East Tennessee to March 1865. 3rd Brigade, Cavalry Division, District of East Tennessee, Department of the Cumberland, to July 1865. Cavalry Brigade, District of East Tennessee, to September 1865.

The 13th Tennessee Cavalry mustered out of service at Knoxville, Tennessee, on September 5, 1865.

== Detailed service ==
Duty in District of Columbus, Ky., and at Camp Nelson, Ky., until January 1864. Duty in District of Nashville and on Nashville & Chattanooga Railroad, and at Bull's Gap, Tenn., until September 1864. Rogersville August 21, 1864. Pursuit to Greenville August 21–23. Blue Springs August 23. Park's Gap, Greenville, September 4. Morgan killed. Gillem's Expedition from eastern Tennessee toward southwest Virginia September 20-October 17. Rheatown September 28. Watauga River September 29. Carter's Station September 30-October 1. Operations in eastern Tennessee October 10–28. Greenville October 12. Bull's Gap October 16. Clinch Mountain October 18. Clinch Valley near Sneedsville October 21. Near Memphis October 25. Mossy Creek and Panther Gap October 27. Morristown and Russellville October 28. Operations against Breckenridge's advance into eastern Tennessee November 4–17. Russellville November 11. Bull's Gap November 11–13. Russellville November 14. Strawberry Plains November 16–17. Flat Creek November 17. Stoneman's Saltsville Raid December 10–29. Big Creek near Rogersville December 12. Kingsport December 13. Glade Springs December 15. Marion and capture of Wytheville December 16. Mt. Airy December 17. Engagement near Marion December 17–18. Capture and destruction of Saltville, Va., December 20–21. Duty in eastern Tennessee until March 1865. Stoneman's Expedition from eastern Tennessee into southwest Virginia and western North Carolina March 21-April 25. Wytheville April 6. Shallow Ford and near Mocksville April 11. Salisbury April 12. Catawba River near Morgantown April 17. Swannanoa Gap, N.C., April 20. Near Hendersonville April 23. Duty in District of East Tennessee until September.

== Commanders ==
- Colonel John K. Miller

== Notable members ==
- Lieutenant Colonel Roderick Randum Butler - U.S. Representative from Tennessee (1867–1875, 1887–1889)
- Sergeant Andrew Campbell, Company G - shot and killed Confederate Brigadier General John Hunt Morgan
- Captain Daniel Ellis, Company A - "pilot" of east Tennessee Unionist refugees

== See also ==
- List of Tennessee Civil War units
- Tennessee in the Civil War
