= 61st United States Colored Infantry Regiment =

61st United States Colored Infantry Regiment 2nd Tennessee Volunteers (African Descent)
- Flag of the United States, 1863-1865
- Active: As the 2nd Tennessee Volunteers (African Descent): June 30 and August 27, 1863 to March 11, 1864; As 61st U.S. Colored Infantry: March 11, 1864 to December 30, 1865
- Disbanded: December 30, 1865
- Country: United States
- Allegiance: Union
- Branch: Infantry
- Size: Regiment
- Engagements: American Civil War: Wolf River Bridge; Battle of Tupelo; Second Battle of Memphis

Commanders
- Notable commanders: Col. Frank A. Kendrick, Lt. Col. John Foley

The 61st United States Colored Infantry was an infantry regiment that served in the Union Army during the American Civil War. The regiment was composed of African American enlisted men commanded by white officers and was authorized by the Bureau of Colored Troops which was created by the United States War Department on May 22, 1863. The non-commissioned officers (sergeants and corporals) and enlisted men were African Americans. The regiment was originally organized as the 2nd Tennessee Volunteer Infantry (African Descent) and was also referred to as the 2nd West Tennessee Infantry Regiment (African Descent).

== Organization ==
The regiment was organized at La Grange, Tennessee in June 1863 as the 2nd Tennessee Volunteer Infantry (African Descent) and assigned to the XVI Corps (Union Army). Recruits were mustered in on June 30 and August 27, 1863 and the regiment was utilized for garrison and guard duty in La Grange, Moscow and Memphis, Tennessee.

== Service ==
An order was issued on September 16, 1863 at La Grange from the Headquarters of the 2nd Division, XVI Corps commanding that the "2nd West Tennessee (African Descent) will proceed to Moscow, Tennessee to relieve the 7th Iowa Volunteers." In the first engagement fought by any Tennessee USCT unit, the regiment was involved in a skirmish at Moscow on December 3, 1863, and the following day in the skirmish at Wolf River Bridge, where they thwarted attempts by Confederate cavalry under General Stephen D. Lee to burn the railroad bridge over the Wolf River.

== Reorganization ==
The regiment was reorganized on March 11, 1864, in Memphis, and re-designated the 61st United States Colored Infantry.

The 61st was part of Major-General A. J. Smith's Expedition to Tupelo, Mississippi July 5–21, 1864. On July 13, as part of the rearguard of Smith's column they were involved in an engagement known as Camargo's Cross Roads (or Burrow's Shop to Confederates). The next day at Harrisburg, near Tupelo, Mississippi, the regiment participated in the Union victory over confederate forces under Major-General Nathan Bedford Forrest at the Battle of Tupelo. In this campaign the 61st lost one officer and seven enlisted men killed, with four officers and 28 enlisted men wounded and 16 enlisted men missing.

Most of the regiment participated in Smith's expedition to Oxford, Mississippi, August 1–30, 1864, and the regiment saw action at Waterford, Mississippi August 16–17, 1864 and at Castpool. A detachment of five officers and 200 enlisted men under Captain Charles Riggs, which had stayed behind during the Oxford expedition, was camped near Memphis and surprised and overrun by Forrest's troops at the Second Battle of Memphis on August 21, 1864, losing three men killed, eight wounded, and five missing.

The regiment was ordered to New Orleans, Louisiana, February 23, 1865 and then to Morganza, Louisiana. On March 17 they were sent to Fort Barrancas, near Pensacola, Florida, and from there were ordered to Blakely, Alabama on April 15, where they finished out their service.

== Mustered out of service ==
The regiment was mustered out on December 30, 1865.

The regimental losses during service totaled 356: 1 Officer and 37 enlisted men killed and mortally wounded and 2 Officers and 316 enlisted men by disease.

== See also ==
- List of United States Colored Troops Civil War Units
- List of Tennessee Union Civil War units
- United States Colored Troops
