= 8th Tennessee Cavalry Regiment =

- Active: August 1863 to September 11, 1865
- Country: United States
- Allegiance: Union
- Branch: Cavalry
- Engagements: Knoxville Campaign; Battle of Blountsville; Battle of Blue Springs; Siege of Knoxville; Battle of Morristown; Battle of Bull's Gap; Second Battle of Saltville

The 8th Tennessee Cavalry Regiment was a cavalry regiment that served in the Union Army during the American Civil War.

== Service ==
The 8th Tennessee Cavalry was organized August 1863 at Camp Nelson, Kentucky, by consolidation of five companies that were organized June 30 through August 14, 1863, for the 10th Tennessee Cavalry and seven companies recruited at large in Tennessee for the 5th East Tennessee Cavalry. The regiment mustered in for a three-year enlistment under the command of Colonel Jesse H. Strickland, and was frequently referred to as the 5th East Tennessee Cavalry.

On February 6, 1864, the 10th East Tennessee Cavalry, which had failed to complete organization, was consolidated with the 8th Tennessee Cavalry and mustered under the command of Colonel Samuel K. N. Patton.

The regiment was attached to 2nd Brigade, 4th Division, XXIII Corps, Army of the Ohio, August–October 1863. 4th Brigade, 4th Division, XXIII Corps, to April 1864. 3rd Brigade, 4th Division, Cavalry Corps, Army of the Cumberland, to October 1864. 3rd Brigade, 4th Division, Cavalry Corps, Military Division Mississippi, to November 1864. District of East Tennessee, Department of the Cumberland, to March 1865. 3rd Brigade, Cavalry Division, District of East Tennessee, to July 1865. Cavalry Brigade, District of East Tennessee, to September 1865.

The 8th Tennessee Cavalry mustered out of service September 11, 1865, at Knoxville, Tennessee.

== Detailed service ==
Skirmish, Hawkins County, August 1, 1863. Burnside's Campaign in eastern Tennessee August 16-October 17, 1863. Occupation of Knoxville September 2. Greenville September 11. Kingsport September 18. Bristol September 19. Carter's Depot September 20–21. Zollicoffer September 20–21. Watauga River Bridge September 21–22. Jonesboro September 21. Hall's Ford, on Watauga River, September 22. Blountsville, Johnson's Depot and Carter's Depot September 22. Blue Springs October 10. Henderson's Mill and Rheatown October 11. Zollicoffer October 12. Blountsville October 14. Bristol October 15. Knoxville Campaign November 4-December 23. Siege of Knoxville November 17-December 5. Duty at Knoxville, Greenville, Nashville and Columbia and patrol duty on line of Nashville & Chattanooga Railroad from Columbia to Nashville until August 1864. At Bull's Gap until October, 1864. Rheatown September 28. Watauga River September 29. Carter's Station September 30-October 1. Operations in eastern Tennessee October 10–28. Greenville October 12. Bull's Gap October 16. Clinch Mountain October 18. Clinch Valley, near Sneedsville, October 21. Mossy Creek and Panther Gap October 27. Morristown October 28. Russellville October 28. Operations against Breckenridge in eastern Tennessee November 4–17. Russellville November 11. Bull's Gap November 11–13. Russellville November 14. Strawberry Plains November 16–17. Flat Creek November 17. Stoneman's Saltville Raid December 10–29. Big Creek, near Rogersville, December 12. Kingsport December 13. Near Glade Springs December 15. Near Marion and capture of Wytheville December 16. Mt. Airey December 17. Near Marion December 17–18. Capture and destruction of salt works at Saltville December 20–21. Stoneman's Expedition from eastern Tennessee into southwest Virginia and western North Carolina March 21-April 25, 1865. Wytheville April 6. Shallow Ford and near Mocksville April 11. Salisbury April 12. Catawba River April 17. Swannanoa Gap April 22. Near Hendersonville April 23. Duty in District of East Tennessee until September 1865.

== Commanders ==
- Colonel Jesse H. Strickland
- Colonel Samuel K. N. Patton

== Casualties ==
The regiment lost a total of 280 men during service; 1 officer and 37 enlisted men killed or mortally wounded, 1 officer and 241 enlisted men died of accident or disease.

== See also ==
- List of Tennessee Civil War units
- Tennessee in the Civil War
