= Smith's Expedition to Tupelo =

Military campaign during the American Civil War

- Part of the American Civil War
- Operational scope: Strategic offensive
- Location: North Mississippi; 34°15′20.4″N 88°44′13.2″W
- Commanded by: (United States) Maj. Gen. Andrew J. Smith
- Objective: Safety of Sherman's supply lines during the Atlanta campaign
- Date: July 5, 1864 – July 21, 1864
- Executed by: Right Wing, 16th Army Corps
- Outcome: Union tactical victory

Smith's Expedition to Tupelo (July 5, 1864 – July 21, 1864) was a campaign conducted by the Union Army in north Mississippi during the American Civil War. Union General Andrew Jackson Smith sought to draw Confederate general Nathan Bedford Forrest's cavalry forces into battle in order to ensure the safety of Sherman's supply lines during the Atlanta campaign. The two armies clashed at the Battle of Tupelo, July 14-15, 1864, where the Union forces inflicted heavy casualties on the Confederate troops. While Forrest was wounded at Tupelo, he and his Cavalry Corps survived Smith's expedition and they continued to pose a threat to Union forces in Tennessee for the remainder of 1864.

== Background ==
Opposing commanders
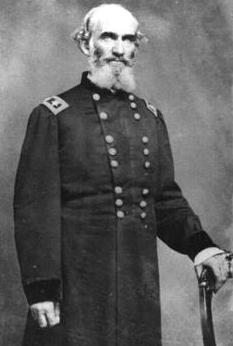
Major General Andrew J. Smith, USA, commanding

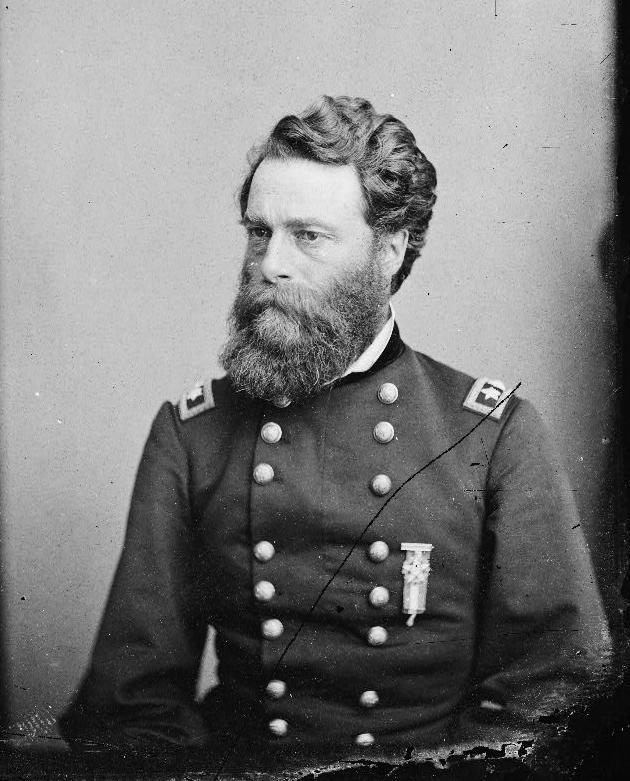
Brigadier General Joseph A. Mower, USA

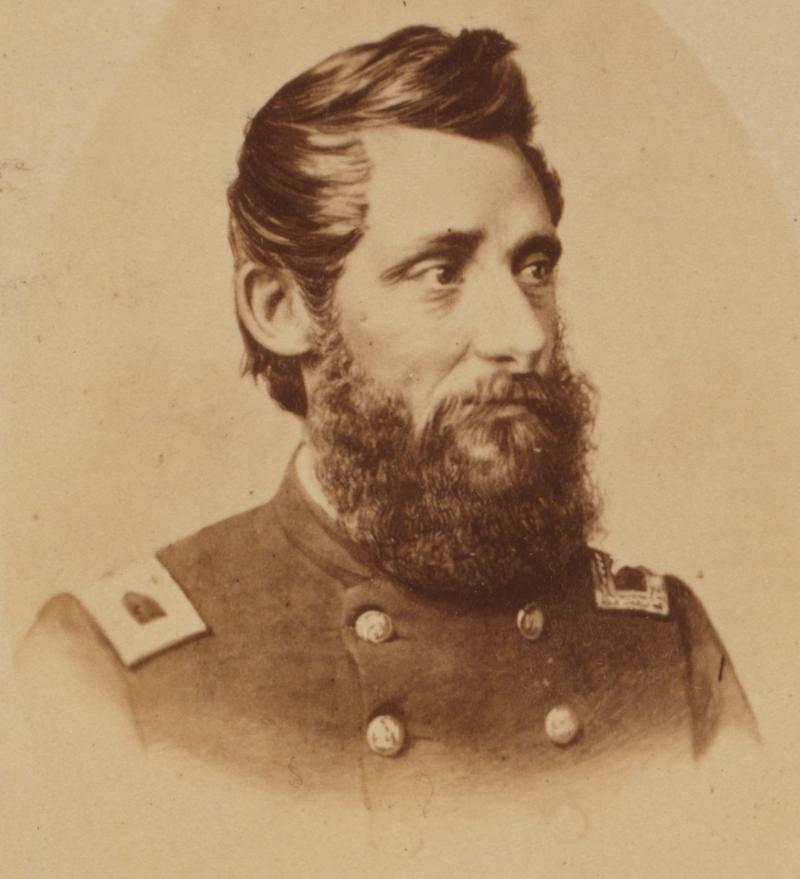
Brigadier General Benjamin Grierson, USA

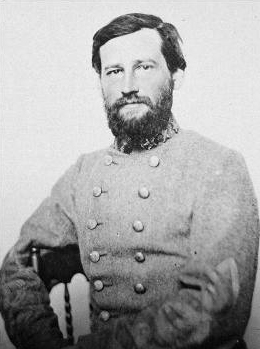
Lieutenant General Stephen D. Lee, CSA, commanding

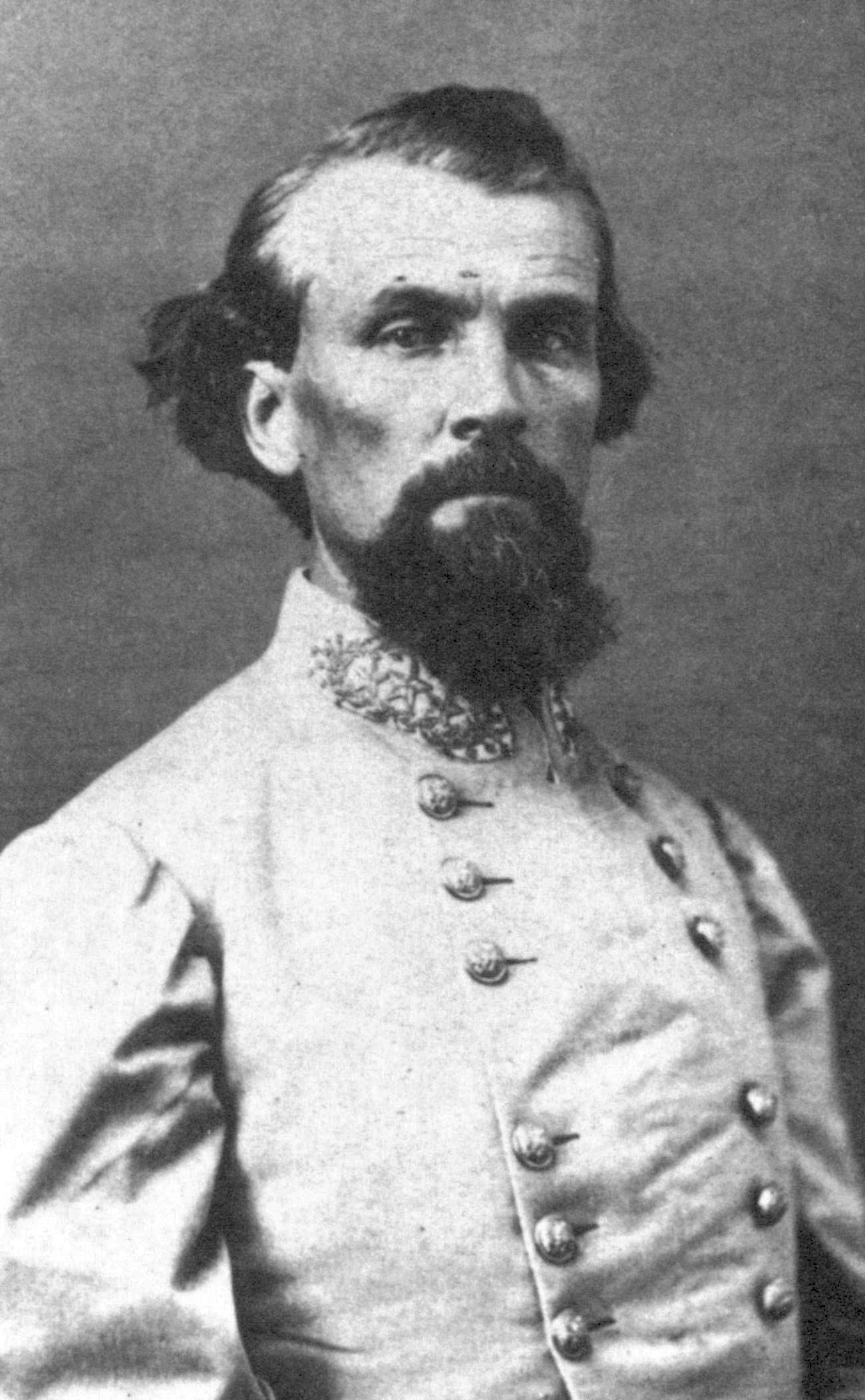
Major General Nathan Bedford Forrest, CSA

After their 1863 victories in Mississippi during the Vicksburg Campaign, Union Generals Ulysses S. Grant and William T. Sherman were dispatched to other states, with Sherman launching his Atlanta Campaign in the spring of 1864. However, General Nathan Bedford Forrest's Confederate cavalry forces still posed a major threat to Union supply lines. Throughout the spring of 1864, Forrest launched successful raids throughout Tennessee, Mississippi, and even as far as Kentucky. The Nashville and Chattanooga Railroad was essential to Sherman to maintain his supply lines, but also vulnerable to attack, so in late May Sherman ordered General Samuel D. Sturgis to march into North Mississippi and attack Forrest's cavalry force.

On June 10, at the Battle of Brice's Cross Roads, Forrest attacked Sturgis' larger army and soundly defeated the Union troops. Sturgis was forced to retreat back to Tennessee, having lost a significant number of artillery pieces and with many of his men captured. Following the disaster at Brice's Cross Roads, Sherman ordered a new force assembled under General Andrew Jackson Smith to reattempt Sturgis' failed mission. Writing to the Secretary of War, Sherman admitted that "Forrest is the very devil, and I think he has got some of our troops under cower," but the general had better hopes for the new campaign: "I have two officers at Memphis that will fight all the time - A. J. Smith and Mower." Smith was an experienced officer whose forces had just returned to Tennessee following the Red River Campaign. Joseph A. Mower had served in the Vicksburg campaign, and Sherman called him "one of the gamest men in our service," promising to promote Mower to Major General if he succeeded in killing Forrest. Joining them would be a veteran cavalry division under Benjamin Grierson, and a newly-recruited brigade of United States Colored Troops under Colonel Edward Bouton.

Following his victory at Brice's Cross Roads, Forrest had established a base for his Cavalry Corps at Tupelo, Mississippi in mid June. Lieutenant General Stephen D. Lee, recently promoted over Forrest, joined the cavalry forces assembling under Forrest, and called in General Phillip Roddey's brigade from North Alabama to join them in Mississippi. Lee was concerned by rumors that a large Union force was assembling to launch an attack on Mobile, Alabama one of the South's most important cities. Lee wanted to bring Smith's force to battle quickly so he could divert his attention and forces towards the defense of Mobile. Lee later said that he offered Forrest the overall command in the coming battle, but Forrest refused and insisted that Lee as the ranking officer should lead the Confederate force.

== July 5 - 12: initial clashes ==
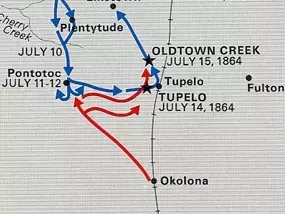
Movements of the Union (blue) and Confederate forces (red) near Tupelo, July 1864.

On July 5, Smith's assembled army, the right wing of the Union 16th Army Corps, departed from La Grange, Tennessee, moving south into Mississippi. The first major clash came on July 7, near Ripley, Mississippi, where units of the 1st Mississippi Partisan Rangers and 3rd Tennessee Cavalry skirmished with the Union 2nd Iowa Cavalry. The Union forces inflicted 36 casualties on the Confederates without taking any losses themselves. In retaliation, Smith's troops burnt the town of Ripley before continuing south. Small skirmishes continued as the Union columns travelled further onwards and Confederate scouting parties tried to ascertain their movements. On July 11 the Union cavalry reached the town of Pontotoc, where a Confederate brigade under Colonel Robert McCulloch had been stationed. Grierson's cavalry drove the Confederates from the town, and McCulloch's brigade supported by General Hylan B. Lyon's Kentucky brigade then established themselves on Pinson's Hill, 2 miles south of Pontotoc.

Confederate Brigadier-General James R. Chalmers was ordered to stall the Union troops while the Confederate preparations for battle were made further south near Okolona. On July 12 the two forces clashed south of Pontotoc along the Okolona road, with the Union 9th Illinois testing the defenses of Lyon's brigade. Smith did not commit to a full-scale battle on the 12th as the Confederates held an advantageous position. Forrest meanwhile, pushed his troops up along the Okolona-Pontotoc road, and by nightfall all of the Southern forces were now assembled for battle.

== July 13: Dash for Tupelo ==
After assessing the situation, Smith realized that while the Confederates had established a good defensive position along the hills south of Pontotoc, they had left the Pontotoc-Tupelo route unguarded. Rather than attack at a disadvantage, Smith headed east towards Tupelo, where he could find more favorable terrain and also destroy sections of the Mobile & Ohio Railroad held by the Confederates. Smith sent Grierson's cavalry ahead, and before dawn on July 13 he began to move his infantry forces towards the town, with the 7th Kansas Cavalry and the brigade of US Colored troops acting as the rearguard.

That morning General Chalmers and Colonel Edmund Rucker realized Smith was moving but took no action, waiting instead for orders. By the time Forrest learned what was happening, the Union column had already advanced ten miles along the road to Tupelo. Forrest then ordered his forces into action against the Union troops, attacking the Union column at various points. The first major clash came around 7 AM when the 61st Colored Infantry successfully ambushed Colonel H.P. Mabry's Mississippians during an attempt to attack the Union rear.

Closer to Tupelo in the afternoon, at Barrow's shop the 8th Mississippi Cavalry under Chalmers hit the Federal lines and fought with the 14th Wisconsin. The Confederates killed several mules in the Union wagon train and burned 7 wagons, 1 caisson, and 2 ambulances, but after this small success the Confederates were repulsed by a Union counterattack, with Federal troops inflicting 47 casualties on the 8th Mississippi. Confederate General Abraham Buford attacked the head of the Union column, but his attack was also successfully repulsed as the Union forces held their ranks and brought in reinforcements. A running skirmish was thus kept up over the course of ten miles from Pontotoc to Tupelo, but the Union forces successfully reached their objective with minimal casualties. Smith then selected a site to form a defensive line two miles to the west of Tupelo, near the abandoned village of Harrisburg, and that evening his troops began to fortify a rail fence along a ridge overlooking the Pontotoc-Tupelo road.

== Battle at Tupelo, July 14-15 ==
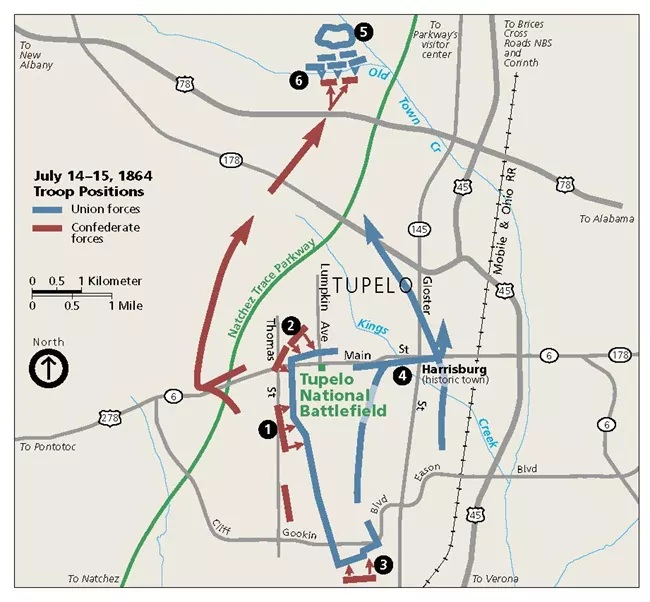
Battle of Tupelo, July 14-15 1864. (1) 7:30 AM, July 14. Crossland's brigade begins a series of uncoordinated Confederate charges against the Federal position, falling back after suffering severe losses. (2) A second Confederate attack led by Mabry and Bell's brigades is also repulsed without success. (3) Unsuccessful Confederate night attack. (4) Afternoon of July 15, Union troops move out from Harrisburg to make camp at Old Town Creek. (5) Confederates attack the Union position, but are defeated. (6) Confederates retreat towards Harrisburg.

On the morning of July 14, Lee assembled his troops with Roddey's Brigade on the right, Mabry's Mississippi Brigade on the left, and Crossland's Kentucky Brigade in the middle. Bell's Brigade was put in the front line on Mabry's right. General Lee supervised the left and center, while Forrest was with the right. Both Chalmers' and Lyon's divisions were held in reserve.

The Union troops held a strong defensive position. The fence they took cover behind had been reinforced overnight, and the space between the Union and Confederate lines was an open field extending from 200 yards to one mile from the Union fortifications.

The dismounted Confederates planned to advance on the Federal line and swing the Confederate right wing (led by Roddey and Forrest) around to flank the Union left. However, due to a misunderstanding or poor communications, the center of the Confederate line consisting of Crossland's Kentucky brigade of Buford's division advanced first while Roddey's brigade failed to move. Noticing that the Confederate right was not advancing, the Federal line focused their firepower on Crossland's troops, inflicting heavy casualties. Forrest chose not to advance and instead withdrew Roddey and Buford, confounding General Lee's original plan of attack.

Mabry's and Bell's brigades advanced on the Confederate left, but they were also repulsed with heavy losses. The Southerners attacked in a disorderly fashion, one brigade at a time, and the Union troops easily cut them down with gunfire and canister shot. The Confederate troops pulled back after 1 PM to form a new defensive line, but Smith did not follow up on his success with a counter-attack, leaving his Union troops in position along the ridge.

On the morning of the 15th, Smith's Union forces discovered that much of their food had spoiled, leaving them with only one day's rations. Crossland's and Buford's forces led an attack on the Union left, but the main Union force was already in motion and formed a new battle line in the afternoon near Old Town Creek, north of Tupelo. Chalmers' and Buford's troops led by Forrest attacked the Union troops, but they were once again pushed back by superior numbers, and Forrest was wounded in the foot. The Confederates withdrew, and the Union troops continued northward towards Memphis.

== Aftermath ==
The poorly-coordinated attacks of July 14th on the Union lines had been extremely costly, with the Confederates losing 1,310 killed, wounded, or missing out of the 3,500 total troops engaged, with the Union troops only suffering 674 casualties. However, Smith failed to press his advantage after the Confederate losses at Tupelo, leaving the Southern force battered but intact. After the war, General Lee reflected that a more skilled officer might have followed up the success at Tupelo with knockout blow to Forrest's corps, Instead, Smith returned north, facing no further attacks from the Confederates, and arrived safely back at La Grange, Tennessee on July 21.

Smith had been explicitly tasked with destroying Forrest's cavalry corps, but he left this work unfinished. The Confederate forces had lost a significant number of men and experienced officers in the battle of July 14, but Forrest's cavalry maintained its ability to raid into Tennessee, hitting Memphis just one month later. The cavalry under Forrest would continue to fight in the Franklin–Nashville campaign later that year, and would ultimately surrender in May, 1865.
