= Stoneman's 1865 raid =

American Civil War military campaign

- Part of the American Civil War
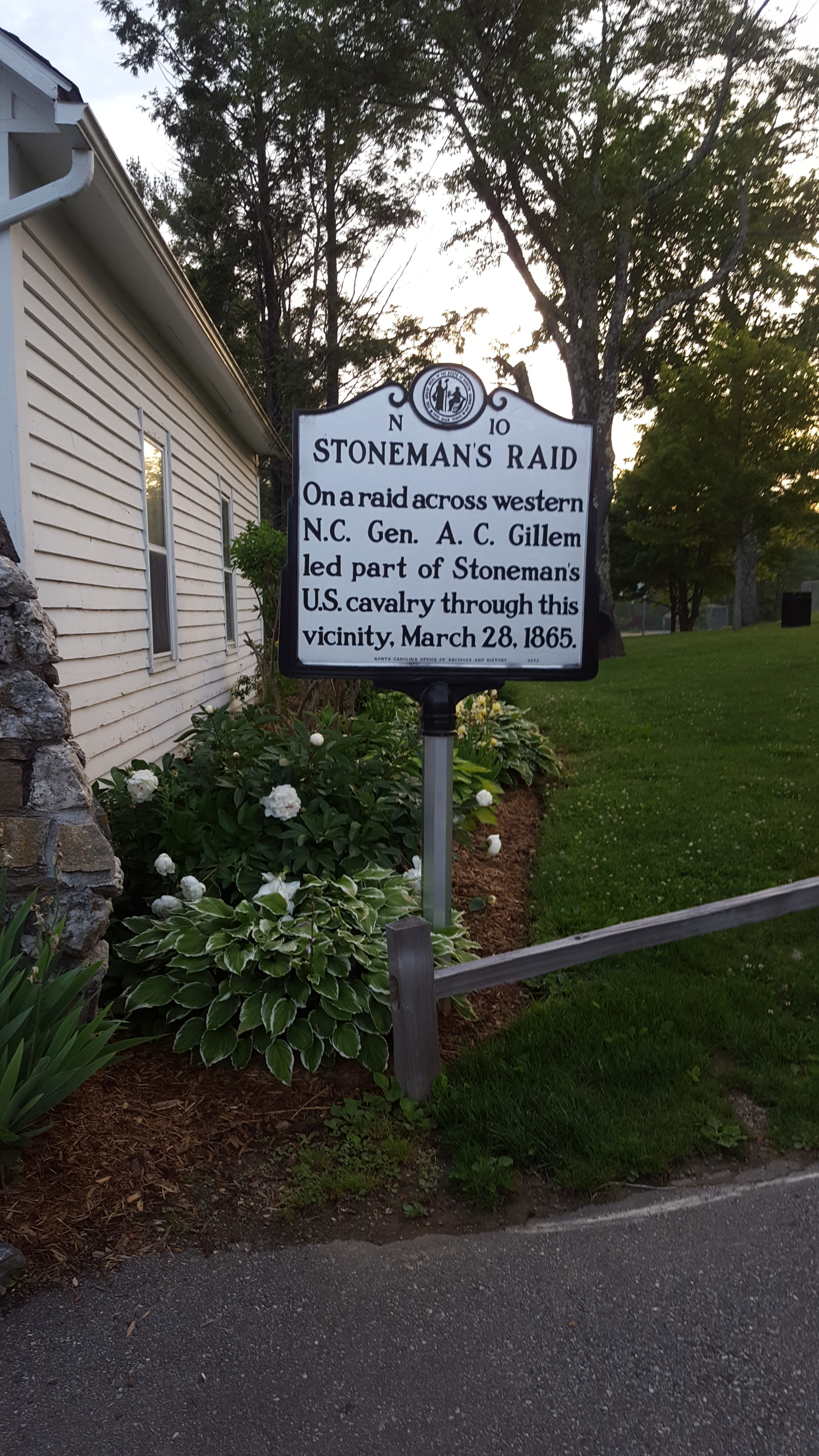
- Historical marker in Blowing Rock, North Carolina marking location where Gen. Alvan Cullem Gillem led the cavalry during Stoneman's raid
| Date | March 23, 1865 – April 26, 1865 |
| Location | Tennessee, North Carolina, Virginia |
| Result | Union victory |

Belligerents
| United States (Union) | (Confederate States of America) CSA (Confederacy) |

Commanders and leaders
| George Stoneman; Alvan Gillem | Joseph E. Johnston; P. G. T. Beauregard |

Strength
| 4-6,000: 2nd and 3rd North Carolina Mounted Infantry Regiments; 8th, 9th and 13th Tennessee Cavalry Regiments; 11th and 12th Kentucky Cavalry Regiments | Unknown |

Casualties and losses
| Unknown | Unknown |

Stoneman's raid in 1865, also called Stoneman's last raid, was a military campaign in the Upper South during the American Civil War, by Union cavalry troops led by General George Stoneman, in the region of eastern Tennessee, western North Carolina and southwestern Virginia. The song "The night they drove old Dixie down" by The Band, mentions Stoneman's cavalry tearing up the tracks that Virgil Cain had worked for the railroad on.

== Background ==
In the later stages of the war from 1864 to 1865, Union forces concentrated on breaking Confederate strongholds. In 1864 General George Stoneman led forces in the Atlanta campaign, leading an expedition to liberate prisoners, but was captured by Confederate Home Guard at Clinton, Georgia. Released after a prisoner exchange in October 1864, he was made deputy to General John Schofield, commander of the Army of the Ohio. He proposed a raid in southwest Virginia to destroy the Virginia and Tennessee Railroad and the saltworks in Saltville followed by an attack towards Salisbury, North Carolina. Schofield authorized the southwest Virginia attack in December but postponed the North Carolina foray. Stoneman successfully carried out his raid, boosting his reputation, while Schofield successfully reversed an order from the Secretary of War and General Ulysses Grant to remove Stoneman from any commands due to his failure in Georgia. With his reputation as an effective commander restored, in February 1865 Stoneman was appointed Commander of the District of East Tennessee. Grant wrote to General George Henry Thomas, Stoneman's superior, authorizing him to allow Stoneman to carry out a raid into Columbia, South Carolina to destroy railroads and supplies, and free prisoners in Salisbury. Thomas' subsequent instructions specified that Stoneman was "to destroy but not to fight battles".

Stoneman wrote to Brigadier Alvan Cullem Gillem to bring his Eighth, Ninth, and Thirteenth Tennessee Cavalry Regiments into the operation and went to Louisville, Kentucky to prepare the Eleventh Kentucky, Twelfth Kentucky, and Eleventh Michigan Cavalry Regiments for his expedition. Stoneman's organization took longer than Grant expected, as he attempted to find sufficient horses to carry out the raid. In the meantime, Union forces under General William Tecumseh Sherman had entered Columbia, rendering it no longer necessary for Stoneman to attack South Carolina. Thomas then revised his orders for Stoneman, ordering him to leave Tennessee through the New River valley towards Christiansburg, Virginia to sabotage the eastern portion of the Virginia and Tennessee Railroad and thus cutoff escape routes for Confederate troops under General Robert E. Lee, who were engaged with Grant's forces in Virginia at near Petersburg and Richmond. Impatient with the delay, Grant wired Thomas on March 19, writing "If Stoneman has not got off on his expedition, start him off at once with whatever force you can give him. He will not meet with opposition now that cannot be overcome with 1,500 men." On March 18 Brigadier Gillem took three brigades—comprising three regiments each—to carry out Stoneman's orders. One was commanded by Colonel William J. Palmer, another by Brevet Brigadier Simeon B. Brown, and the last by Colonel John K. Miller. The artillery battery was led by Lieutenant James M. Regan.

== Raid ==
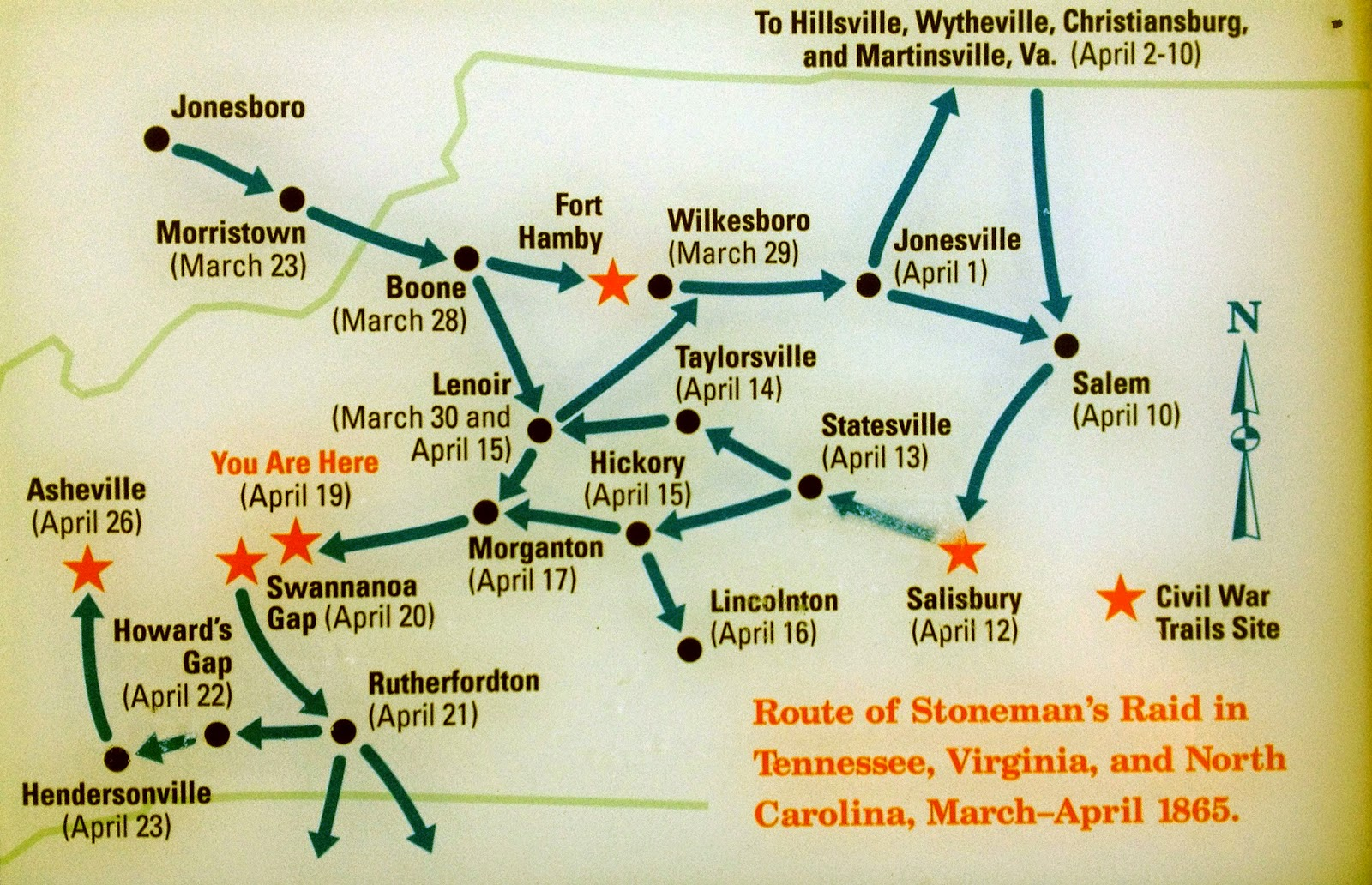
Stoneman's last raid

On March 23, 1865, the nine Union cavalry regiments entered Morristown, Tennessee, where they were received favorably by the locals. East of the town at Bull's Gap, the force split into two groups, with one marching directly east and the other going through Carter's Station and the Watauga River to avoid Confederate forces in Jonesboro. The Union soldiers were tasked with orders to "dismantle the country". They headed east into North Carolina.

Following a skirmish in Boone, Sherman decided to descend from the mountain and obtain more horses and supplies in Wilkesboro. Dividing his forces, he took Palmer's brigade directly towards the town through Deep Gap and ordered Gillem to lead Brown's and Miller's brigades to Patterson's Factory, a cotton mill outside of Lenoir. The federal troops arrived in the evening and camped for the night. Though they seized some food and left behind a rearguard to destroy the factory and supply stores, they were forbidden from further foraging and plundering in the vicinity. Gillem reunited with Sherman outside of Wilkesboro in the afternoon of March 29. Sherman ordered the 12th Ohio Cavalry to proceed into the town. Local merchant Calvin J. Cowles observed that they arrived "with a yell and ran completely through the place, frightening a small body of Confederates out of their wits and out of the place". As he was publicly known for his Unionist bona fides, Cowles was able to approach Stoneman and convince him to guarantee that federal troops would protect property and not destroy the Wilkes County Courthouse or local food supplies.

The raiders headed north into Virginia on April 2, where they destroyed 150 miles of railroad track belonging to the Virginia & Tennessee Railroad. They also burned half of the town of Abingdon, Virginia on their way north. On April 9, 1865, they re-entered North Carolina. The following day, Stoneman divided his forces at Germanton, sending a brigade under Palmer to capture Salem and cut the rail lines around Greensboro while taking the rest of his forces south towards Salisbury.

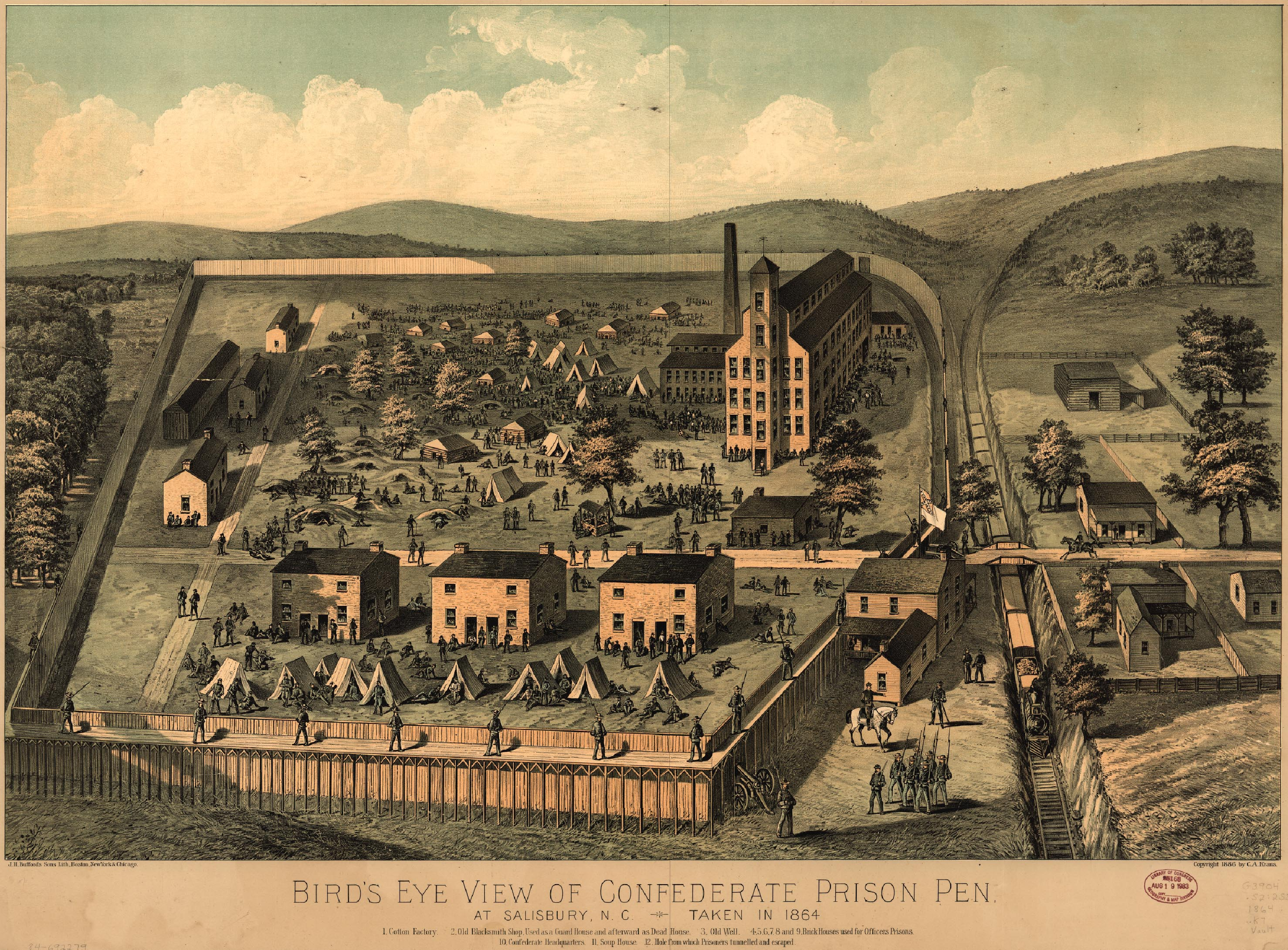
The federal forces burned the Confederate prison in Salisbury (depicted).

On April 12, 1865, Stoneman's forces entered Salisbury, a major railroad hub, military depot, and home to Salisbury Prison, the only Confederate prison in the state for captured Union troops. Originally built with a capacity for 2,000 prisoners, the prison eventually held 10,000, with resulting problems of malnutrition and disease. The Confederates evacuated the prison before Union troops arrived, but the latter set fire to the entire structure. The resulting conflagration could be seen for miles. A detachment of 1,000 troops under Colonel John K. Miller then proceeded towards the Yadkin River on the Rowan-Davidson County line in attempt to destroy the railway trestle there. The rail line was protected by 1,000–1,600 Confederate troops stationed in Fort York atop a bluff on the opposite side of the river. Stoneman dispatched artillery to Miller's troops but they were unable to cross the river and after 5.5 hours they withdrew towards Salisbury, dismantling the railway track on the Rowan side of the river but failing to destroy the bridge.

Stoneman's forces began withdrawing towards Tennessee on April 13. The Union troops traveled west in North Carolina, destroying military supplies in Statesville, Lincolnton, Taylorsville, and Asheville. They destroyed a large bridge of the Charlotte and South Carolina Railroad over the Catawba River. The raiders re-entered Tennessee on April 26, 1865. Hundreds of freed slaves accompanied them as they left Asheville.

This was the same day that Confederate General Joseph E. Johnston surrendered to General Sherman at Bennett Place, in Durham, North Carolina. It was the largest surrender of Confederate soldiers and it ended the war. Stoneman's 1865 raid covered over 600 miles in total length through three states. Sherman dispatched orders to Stoneman on April 18 to join him in Raleigh but, as he was already moving towards Tennessee, he never received the instruction.

== Legacy ==
Several historians have argued that Stoneman's sabotage, particularly at Salisbury, served no strategic purpose to the federal war effort in light of the concurrent collapse of the Confederacy. Historian Allen W. Trelease later wrote of this viewpoint that it "could not have been as clear at the time. The Confederates still had the capacity to fight if not to win, and their readiness to do so was still an open question."

The state of North Carolina later erected historical markers in each community where Stoneman's cavalry camped or fought during the raid, including west of Lewisville, in Blowing Rock, and in Dobson.

== Works cited ==
- Barrett, John G. (1963). The Civil War in North Carolina. Chapel Hill: The University of North Carolina Press. ISBN 0-8078-4520-5.
- Fordney, Ben Fuller (2010). George Stoneman : A Biography of the Union General. Jefferson: McFarland. ISBN 9780786483464.
- Hayes, Johnson J. Hayes (1962). The Land of Wilkes. Wilkesboro: Wilkes County Historical Society. OCLC 3586318.
- Hartley, Chris J. (1998). ""Like An Avalanche" : George Stoneman's 1865 Cavalry Raid". Civil War Regiments. 6 (1): 74–92.
- Hill, Michael, ed. (2007). Guide to North Carolina Highway Historical Markers (10th ed.). Raleigh: North Carolina Office of Archives and History. ISBN 978-0-86526-328-4.
- Trelease, Allen W. (1991). The North Carolina Railroad, 1849–1871, and the Modernization of North Carolina. Fred W. Morrison Series in Southern Studies. University of North Carolina Press. ISBN 9780807819418.
- Van Noppen, Ina W. (January 1961). "The Significance of Stoneman's Last Raid". The North Carolina Historical Review. 38 (1): 19–44. JSTOR 23516987.
