= Battle of Morristown =

Battle of the American Civil War

Coordinates: 36.215090°N 83.289258°W

- Part of the American Civil War
Date	October 28, 1864
Location	Present-day Hamblen County, Tennessee (Note: Hamblen County wasn't created until 1870 from parts of Grainger, Jefferson, and Hawkins County.)
Result	Union victory

Belligerents
United States (Union)	Confederate States of America (Confederacy)

Commanders and leaders
Alvan C. Gillem	John C. Vaughn

Strength
~2,800	~1,700

Casualties and losses
~26 total 8 killed 18 wounded	~309 total 85 killed 224 wounded and captured

The Battle of Morristown took place during the American Civil War in present-day Hamblen County, Tennessee on October 28, 1864. Union forces under General Alvan C. Gillem attacked Confederate forces under General John C. Vaughn who were defending Morristown, Tennessee. Vaughn's Confederates were routed and Gillem's forces pursued them into nearby Russellville, Tennessee.

== Background ==
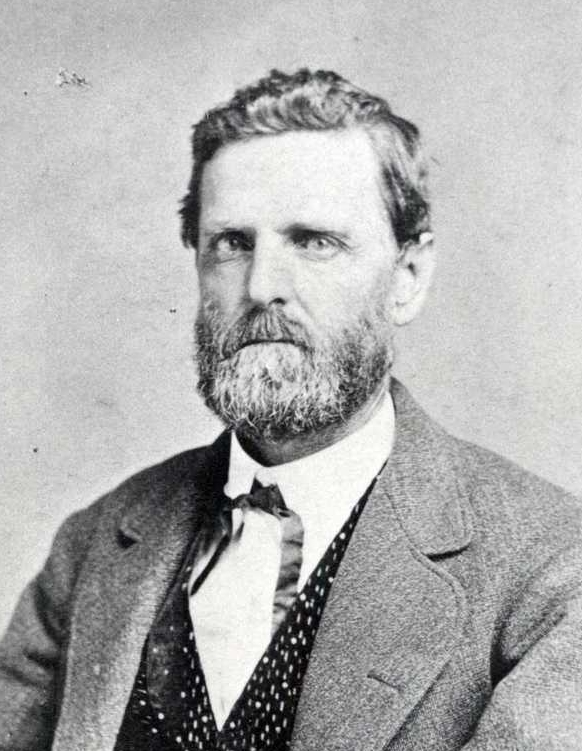
Confederate general John C. Vaughn.

Morristown, Tennessee sat at the crossroads of the East Tennessee & Virginia Railroad and the turnpike to Cumberland Gap. This railroad location meant that troops were moving through Morristown as early as Spring 1861. The town would remain a key military crossroads for the rest of the war. At the time, it was a small collection of buildings surrounded by open farm land. Shortly after becoming Abraham Lincoln's running mate for the election of 1864, Andrew Johnson began working on removing Confederate resistance in East Tennessee. Johnson sent Brigadier General Alvan C. Gillem to establish civil law and protect loyal mountaineers. In October 1864, Brigadier General John C. Vaughn's Confederate forces captured the railroad depot at Bull's Gap, before taking up positions southwest at Morristown. Gillem moved his Union forces from New Market, Tennessee to Morristown in order to dislodge Vaughn out of East Tennessee and capture his men. The Union troops reached Mossy Creek (now Jefferson City) and Panther Creek, just west of Morristown, on October 27.

== Battle ==
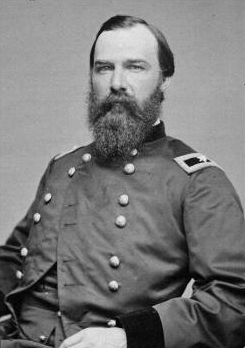
Union general Alvan C. Gillem.

In preparing his defenses, Vaughn deployed his Confederate forces into two lines. The first line, dismounted, ran west of the town for around a mile long. The second line, also about a mile long, was east of the town and was most likely flanked on both sides with artillery. One section of artillery was stationed where Morristown College (now Fulton-Hill Park) used to be.

On the morning of October 28, 1864, Gillem's Union brigade arrived at the battlefield around 9 o'clock coming from the west. On his approach to Morristown, he was engaged by about 100 Confederates under the command of Col. James Rose (namesake of Morristown's Rose Center). They were sent by Vaughn to scout the size of the Union army. This forced Gillem's forces to deploy as Col. Rose returned to Vaughn to report the superior Union force. Upon nearing the first Confederate line, Gillem's artillery deployed itself to his right flank and opened fire on the Confederate left, whose artillery promptly returned fire. A brigade of Gillem's Union cavalry charged the center and the right of the first Confederate line under fire. There, they slammed into the Rebels and began to push them back. The Confederate left, seeing the charge develop on their right, used dismounted forces from the first line and cavalry from the second line to attack the Union right. Despite initially pushing the Union line back, the Confederates failed to break through.

The first line on the Confederate right then collapsed and were chased by Union cavalrymen. The Union cavalry pushed into the town itself, where they were counter charged by mounted Confederates. The Union forces on the right then began moving to get behind the Confederate's far left, south of the town. A Union cavalry charge was launched at points all along the Confederate line and the Rebels buckled under the pressure, with the final line giving way. It is believed that the second line first broke on the far left. Union cavalrymen were already to their rear and moving quickly to cut off any retreat. The Confederate artillery battery was captured east of town. The town itself was captured along with Col. Rose, whose horse was shot down. The Confederates at first tried to have an orderly withdrawal, but pressure from the Union forces turned it into a full-blown rout towards Russellville, Tennessee. Vaughn even admitted in his official report, "I regret to say that my command was stampeded at Morristown this morning." They were heavily pursued by Union forces until the Confederates, freshly reinforced, made a stand at Russellville. The Union forces had successfully pushed Vaughn out of Morristown.

== Aftermath ==
Vaughn had been completely driven out of Morristown and his men routed. The battle is locally known as "Vaughn's Stampede." He would withdraw into northeast Tennessee and be reinforced under the command of former vice president Major General John C. Breckinridge. From November 11–13, they would go on the offensive and attack Gillem at the Battle of Bull's Gap. Gillem's forces were routed and the battle became known as "Gillem's Stampede." He was forced to abandon Morristown and retreat to Strawberry Plains near Knoxville, Tennessee.

=== Casualties ===
About 18 Union soldiers were wounded, and 8 killed. The Confederates lost around 85 killed and 224 wounded or captured.

== Battlefield ==
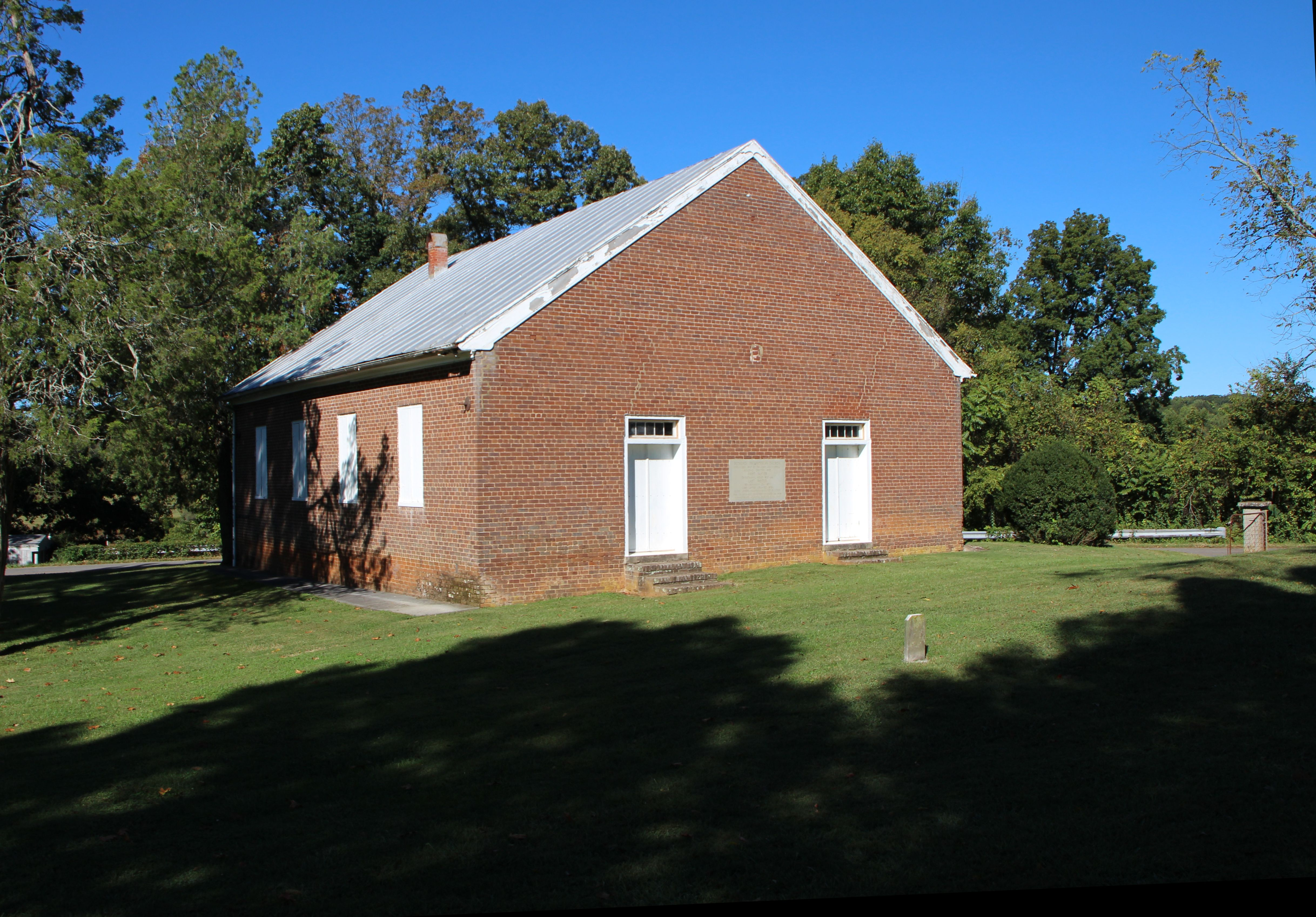
Bethesda Presbyterian Church was a hospital during operations around Morristown.

There is little mention of the battle in current-day Morristown. Most of what was the battlefield is now developed land. The only remnants of the battle is Bethesda Presbyterian Church, which was a hospital used during the fighting, and numerous graveyards in Hamblen County. There is a Civil War Trails sign outside of the Hamblen County Courthouse describing the battle. At Bethesda Presbyterian Church, Emma Jarnagin Cemetery, and Liberty Hill Cemetery, there are memorials for unknown Confederate dead, many of whom were killed in the skirmishes around Morristown.
