= 1st Battalion Tennessee Light Artillery, Battery "B" =

- Active: April 16, 1863, to July 20, 1865
- Country: United States
- Allegiance: Union
- Branch: Artillery

Battery B, 1st Battalion Tennessee Light Artillery was an artillery battery that served in the Union Army during the American Civil War. It was initially organized as the 1st East Tennessee Battery.

== Service ==
The battalion was organized in Memphis, Nashville, and Knoxville, Tennessee, from June 13, 1863, through October 16, 1863, under the command of Lieutenant Colonel Robert Clay Crawford. Battery B was raised and mustered in at Lexington, Kentucky, from eastern Tennessee refugees for three years service on April 16, 1863, under the command of Captain Robert Clay Crawford.

Battery B was attached to District of Kentucky, Department of the Ohio, to August 1863. Willcox's Division, Left Wing Forces, XXIII Corps, Department of the Ohio, to January 1864. District of the Clinch, Department of the Ohio, to April 1864. 1st Brigade, 4th Division, XXIII Corps, Department of the Ohio, to February 1865. 1st Brigade, 4th Division, District of East Tennessee, to March 1865. 2nd Brigade, 4th Division, District of East Tennessee, to July 1865.

Battery B, 1st Battalion Tennessee Light Artillery mustered out of service at Nashville, Tennessee, on July 20, 1865.

== Detailed service ==
From Lexington, the battery moved to Nicholasville, Kentucky, for drill and instruction. In May 1863 the battery moved to Camp Nelson, Kentucky. On July 16, 1863, the battery moved to Somerset, Kentucky. It performed duty in Kentucky until August 1863. Action at Tripletts Bridge June 16. Operations against Scott in eastern Kentucky July 25-August 6. Expedition to Cumberland Gap August 17-September 7. Winter's Gap August 31. Operations about Cumberland Gap September 7–10. Duty at Cumberland Gap until May 1865, and in District of East Tennessee until July.

== Commanders ==
- Captain Robert Clay Crawford - promoted to lieutenant colonel of the battalion
- Captain William O. Beebe

== See also ==
- List of Tennessee Civil War units
- Tennessee in the Civil War
