= Daniel Ellis (army captain) =

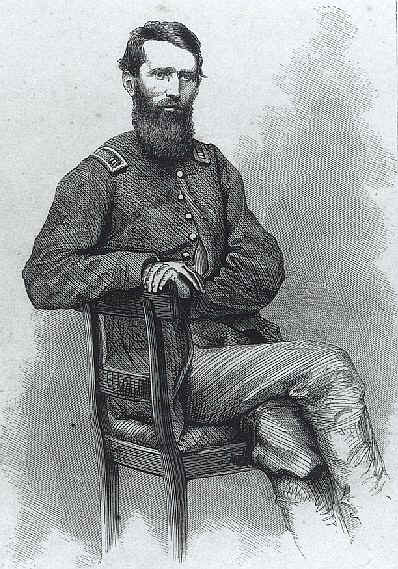
- Daniel Ellis
- Born: December 30, 1827; Carter County, Tennessee
- Died: January 6, 1908 (aged 80); Carter County, Tennessee
- Burial place: Ellis Family Cemetery, Elizabethton, Tennessee
- Military career
- Allegiance: United States of America
- Service years: 1846–1848, 1861–1865
- Rank: Captain
- Nickname: The Old Red Fox
- Unit: 13th Tennessee Cavalry
- Commands: Company A
- Conflicts: Mexican–American War; American Civil War
- Other work: Author of Thrilling Adventures of Captain Daniel Ellis (1867)

Daniel Ellis (December 30, 1827 – January 6, 1908) was a captain in the Union Army during the American Civil War.

== Early life and career ==
Ellis was born in Carter County in northeastern Tennessee. With a rudimentary education, Ellis was a farmer and wagonmaker until volunteering for service in the Mexican–American War, serving in Company K, 5th Regular Tennessee Volunteer Infantry. Most of his war service was spent battling the "intestine foe" which would plague him for the rest of his life, ultimately leading to his death. He returned home from Mexico to regain his health and resume his expectedly ordinary life.

Ellis married Martha May of Sussex County, Virginia, with whom he had seven children between 1852 and 1866.

== Civil War ==
The Civil War found East Tennessee strongly divided in its loyalties with many citizens—like Ellis—favoring the Union. When Tennessee seceded, Confederate troops were sent in to control Union sympathizers. Ellis became involved in a failed plan to burn railroad bridges to precipitate an invasion by Union forces.

Branded a bridge burner, a capital offense, Ellis lived in exile in the east Tennessee mountains. He eventually became a pilot, leading Unionists, Confederate deserters, prison escapees, slaves, and all manner of fugitives through the mountains into Kentucky or wherever the Union lines would advance. At the same time Ellis recruited for several regiments, provided information on Confederate activities to federal authorities, and maintained a mail service between mountain Unionists and their men in the Union army. Possibly the most successful of all such pilots, and despite a bounty on his head, Ellis always (often narrowly) escaped capture, and became known as "The Old Red Fox".

Mountain warfare involved significant casualties and a breakdown of legal order. Ellis's reputation for severe retaliation likely increased his family's chances of survival. His guerrilla group was well-equipped through his personal contacts, making them a highly capable military force.

In all, Ellis made 20 expeditions, covering 8,000 miles, leading approximately 4,000 fugitives through the mountains. Over half of these joined the Union army. Ellis was a constant aggravation to Confederate authorities, and contributed incalculably to the morale of the beleaguered Unionist east Tennesseans.

As the war waned and his piloting duties were less in demand, he formally joined the Union army as captain of Company A, 13th Regiment, Tennessee Volunteer Cavalry. His official duties included leading raids against Confederates in northeast Tennessee counties, guiding federal troops through the northwestern North Carolina mountains, and tracking and arresting federal soldiers who were deserters. Ellis mustered out of service in September 1865.

== Later life ==
After the war, trying to eke out a living in the war-savaged mountains and often the victim of his own altruistic nature, Ellis petitioned the U.S. Congress for compensation for his efforts on behalf of the Union. He was recognized with an award of $3,060—about two years' pay and allowances for an army captain.

In 1867 Ellis first published his war memoirs, Thrilling Adventures of Daniel Ellis. Ellis was probably assisted in writing the book by William R. Fitzsimmons, who was a prominent East Tennessee newspaperman, and whose name appears as "part-proprietor" on Ellis' contract with the publisher, Harper & Brothers (for an examination of Ellis' authorship of Thrilling Adventures, see Ellis, Allen. "The Lost Adventures of Daniel Ellis." in The Journal of East Tennessee History no. 74 (2002), pp. 58–68).

Despite the popularity of his book, and partly because of his tendency to give copies away, Ellis remained in poor financial straits. In 1878 Ellis was chosen to act as bodyguard in the congressional campaign of Robert Love Taylor. Taylor rewarded Ellis with a position within the U.S. House of Representatives.

Years later, writer James R. Gilmore ("Edmund Kirke") was shocked to find Ellis, whom he considered "the hero of the late war" living in obscurity and poverty in the east Tennessee mountains. Gilmore worked to provide more government compensation for the old scout, and used him as a supporting character in one of his novels, A Mountain-White Heroine (1889).

Due to continued Confederate loyalties in the east Tennessee region, the nature of Ellis' wartime activities, and to reactions toward his vitriolic book, Ellis' life was threatened for years after the war. As long as he was able, he was compelled to travel well-armed and always on the alert. Nonetheless, Ellis lived into old age, always preferring to walk when possible, recounting his exploits, and enjoying a measure of local celebrity.

Ellis is buried in the family cemetery near Elizabethton, Tennessee.

== Legacy ==
Today Ellis is hardly remembered outside of Carter County, with his legacy perhaps swept up in a healing repression of the horrors, cruelty, and upheaval of the Civil War in the Appalachian mountains. However, his writings seem to be emerging from obscurity as the Civil War experience of the Appalachian south gains more attention from historians.

Thrilling Adventures of Daniel Ellis remains in print and, despite its narrative excesses, is largely regarded as an invaluable, if highly partisan, accounting of conditions in wartime Appalachia. Some modern critics feel Ellis exaggerates his own role, while Ellis' contemporaries maintain that he was too modest to adequately convey his war record.

Ellis' wartime tales have also made some recent inroads into popular culture:

- Thrilling Adventures was used as a source (and inspired a scene or two) by Charles Frazier for his celebrated novel, Cold Mountain, which was later adapted into a major motion picture released in 2003.
- A character based upon Ellis (and Ellis himself) appears in Cameron Judd's "Mountain War Trilogy":
  - The Phantom Legion: A Novel of Unionist Resistance in Tennessee and North Carolina, February–December 1863 (New York, 1997).
  - Season of Reckoning: A Novel of Unionist Resistance in Tennessee and North Carolina, January 1864 – February 1866 (New York, 1997).
  - The Shadow Warriors: A Novel of Unionist Resistance in Tennessee and North Carolina, September 1860 – January 1863 (New York, 1997).
  - Junius and Albert's Adventures in the Confederacy: A Civil War Odyssey The book follows two Journalists, Junius Henri Browne and Albert D. Richardson, who escaped from a Confederate Prison and ended up joining one of Ellis's expeditions after their prison break.
