= 1st Battalion Tennessee Light Artillery, Battery "K" =

- Active: October 1863 to July 1865
- Country: United States
- Allegiance: Union
- Branch: Artillery

Battery K, 1st Battalion Tennessee Light Artillery was an artillery battery that served in the Union Army during the American Civil War.

== Service ==
The battalion was organized in Memphis, Nashville, and Knoxville, Tennessee, from June 13, 1863, through October 16, 1863, under the command of Lieutenant Colonel Robert Clay Crawford.

The only record for Battery K notes that it was ordered from Nashville to Knoxville on March 22, 1865. It was on garrison duty there until July 1865 when the battery was mustered out of the service.

== See also ==
- List of Tennessee Civil War units
- Tennessee in the Civil War
