= 2nd Tennessee Colored Heavy Artillery Regiment =

2nd Tennessee Heavy Artillery Regiment (African Descent) 4th Regiment Heavy Artillery U.S. Colored Troops
- Active: June 1863 to February 25, 1866
- Country: United States
- Allegiance: United States Union
- Branch: Artillery; United States Colored Troops
- Size: Regiment
- Engagements: American Civil War: Skirmish near Pine Bluff, AR, October 1864

The 2nd Tennessee Heavy Artillery Regiment (African Descent) was a regiment of African-American troops recruited from Tennessee that served in the Union Army during the American Civil War. It was later redesignated as the 4th Regiment Heavy Artillery U.S. Colored Troops until it was mustered out of service in February 1866.

== Unit History ==
The 2nd Tennessee Heavy Artillery (African Descent) was organized at Columbus, Kentucky and mustered in for three years under the command of Colonel Charles H. Adams. The first recruits were assigned to Companies A, B, and C in June 1863, but the rest of the companies were not fully enrolled and mustered until November 1863. The regiment consisted of nine companies of artillery.

Most artillery units in the United States Colored Troops were designated as heavy artillery, meaning that they manned cannons within fixed fortifications. The regiment was attached to District of Columbus, Kentucky, 6th Division, XVI Corps, Department of the Tennessee, to April 1864. It was assigned to garrison duty at various locations including Fort Halleck near Columbus, Kentucky, Union City, Tennessee, Fort Donelson, Tennessee and Pine Bluff, Arkansas.

The only combat action of the regiment was a skirmish with Confederate troops near Pine Bluff on October 11, 1864. While on recruiting duty, a company of the regiment was ambushed and had to fight off an attack by Confederate cavalry. One officer and 3 soldiers of the regiment were killed, along with 9 wounded. A USCT officer reporting on this action said: "As for the colored soldiers they behaved nobly. There was not a single instance in which they did not surpass my expectations of them."

The 2nd Tennessee Heavy Artillery was renamed as the 3rd Regiment US Colored Heavy Artillery on March 11, 1864, and then as the 4th United States Colored Heavy Artillery Regiment on April 26, a designation it kept until it was mustered out of service on February 25, 1866.

== Commanders ==
- Colonel Charles H. Adams

== See also ==
- List of United States Colored Troops units in the American Civil War
- List of Tennessee Civil War units
- Tennessee in the Civil War
