= 10th Tennessee Cavalry Regiment =

- Active: August 25, 1863, to August 1, 1865
- Country: United States
- Allegiance: Union
- Branch: Cavalry
- Engagements: Nashville Campaign; Battle of Franklin; Battle of Nashville

The 10th Tennessee Cavalry Regiment was a cavalry regiment that served in the Union Army during the American Civil War.

== Service ==
The 10th Tennessee Cavalry was organized August 25, 1863, in Nashville, Tennessee, and mustered in for a three-year enlistment under the command of Lieutenant Colonel George Washington Bridges.

The regiment was attached to District of North Central Kentucky, Department of the Ohio, to January 1864. Defenses of Nashville & Northwestern Railroad, Department of the Cumberland, to April 1864. 2nd Brigade, 4th Division, Cavalry Corps, Department of the Cumberland, to October 1864. 2nd Brigade, 4th Division, Cavalry Corps, Military Division Mississippi, to November 1864. 1st Brigade, 5th Division, Cavalry Corps, Military Division Mississippi, to February 1865. 1st Brigade, 7th Division, Cavalry Corps, Military Division Mississippi, to March 1865. Department of Mississippi to May 1865. District of Nashville, Tennessee, Department of the Cumberland, to August 1865.

The 10th Tennessee Cavalry mustered out of service on August 1, 1865, at Nashville, Tennessee.

== Detailed service ==
Duty in District of North Central Kentucky until January 1864. At Nashville and Pulaski, Tenn., and on line of the Nashville & Chattanooga Railroad and Nashville & Northwestern Railroad until November 1864. Scouts in Hickman and Maury Counties May 2–12, 1864. Long's Mill, near Mulberry Creek, July 28. Clifton August 15–16. Skirmish at Rogersville August 21, 1864. Pursuit to Greenville August 21–23. Blue Springs August 23. Operations against Forrest's Raid in northern Alabama and middle Tennessee September 16-October 10. Richland Creek, near Pulaski, September 26. Pulaski September 26–27. Guard Tennessee River October. Florence October 30. On line of Shoal Creek November 5–11. Nashville Campaign November–December. On line of Shoal Creek November 16–20. Near Maysville and near New Market November 17. On front of Columbia November 24–27. Crossing of Duck River November 28. Franklin November 30. Battle of Nashville December 15–16. Pursuit of Hood to the Tennessee River December 17–28. Hollow Tree Gap and West Harpeth River December 17. Rutherford Creek December 19. Richland Creek December 24. Pulaski December 25–26. Hillsboro December 29. Leighton December 30. At Gravelly Springs, Ala., until February 1865. Moved to Vicksburg, Miss., thence to New Orleans, La., February 6-March 10. Ordered to Natchez, Miss., March, and duty there and at Rodney, Miss., until May 25. Ordered to Nashville, Tenn., May 25. Garrison duty at Johnsonville, Tenn., until August.

Throughout its term of service, the 10th Tennessee Cavalry was poorly equipped and greatly under strength. Brigadier General Richard W. Johnson, Commanding 6th Division, at Fayetteville, Tennessee, reported on February 8, 1865: "The troops under my command have killed 18 guerrillas and captured 12, since my arrival here, not counting a number of men belonging to the 10th and 12th Tennessee Cavalry Regiments, (U.S.A.) who had deserted and become guerrillas of the worst type, who have been captured and forwarded to their regiments."

== Commanders ==
- Lieutenant Colonel George Washington Bridges - arrested for neglect of duty and relieved of command in November 1864
- Lieutenant Colonel James T. Abernathy
- Major William P. Story - commanded during the battle of Nashville

== Casualties ==
The regiment lost a total of 207 men during service; 1 officer and 24 enlisted men killed or mortally wounded, 1 officer and 181 enlisted men died of disease or accident.

== See also ==
- List of Tennessee Civil War units
- Tennessee in the Civil War
