= George Washington Bridges =

American politician (1825–1873)

Member of the U.S. House of Representatives from Tennessee's 3rd district
- In office February 25, 1863 – March 3, 1863
- Preceded by: Reese Bowen Brabson
- Succeeded by: William Brickly Stokes

Personal details
- Born: October 9, 1825 Charleston, Tennessee, U.S.
- Died: March 16, 1873 (aged 47) Athens, Tennessee, U.S.
- Party: Democratic
- Education: East Tennessee University
- Profession: Attorney

Military service
- Allegiance: United States of America
- Branch/service: United States Army
- Years of service: 1863–1864
- Rank: Lieutenant Colonel
- Commands: 10th Tennessee Cavalry (1863–4)
- Battles/wars: American Civil War

George Washington Bridges (October 9, 1825 – March 16, 1873) was an American politician and a member of the United States House of Representatives for the 3rd congressional district of Tennessee from 1861 to 1863. A Southern Unionist, he was arrested and jailed by Confederate authorities during the first few months of the Civil War in 1861. Though he eventually escaped, he did not take his seat in Congress until February 25, 1863, a few days before his term expired.

Following his congressional term, Bridges joined the Union Army with the rank of lieutenant-colonel, and commanded the 10th Tennessee Cavalry from August 1863 to November 1864. After the war, Bridges served as a state circuit court judge.

== Early life ==
Most contemporary biographies state that Bridges was born in Charleston, Tennessee, though in a letter to congressional biographer Charles Lanman, he stated he was born in McMinn County, Tennessee, and raised in McMinn's county seat, Athens, where he would live and work for most his life. He attended East Tennessee University (the forerunner of the University of Tennessee) in Knoxville, studied law, and was admitted to the bar in 1848. By March 1849, he had commenced practice in Athens, specializing in claims collection.

In late 1849, the Tennessee state legislature appointed Bridges district attorney general for the state's third circuit. The legislature amended the state constitution in the early 1850s to require district attorneys to be selected by popular vote, forcing Bridges to run for reelection in 1854. In the election that year, he defeated rising Chattanooga attorney Daniel C. Trewhitt, 3,204 votes to 2,541. He remained district attorney of the 3rd circuit until 1860, when he declined to run for reelection.

Bridges was an active member of the state Democratic Party throughout the 1850s. He represented McMinn County at the state Democratic Party convention in 1851, and was appointed by newly elected Democratic governor Andrew Johnson to the board of directors of the East Tennessee and Georgia Railroad in 1854. He also served on the board of directors for the Athens branch of the Bank of Tennessee during this period. He owned slaves. In 1859, he served as a vice president of the state Democratic Party convention.

== Civil War ==
Like many of East Tennessee's pro-Union Democrats, Bridges supported the Northern Democratic candidate, Stephen Douglas, during the 1860 presidential election. He served as the Douglas elector for the state's 3rd district, and thus spent several weeks campaigning for Douglas, helping him carry the popular vote in the district in the general election. In mid-1861, Bridges attended both the Knoxville and Greeneville sessions of the pro-Union East Tennessee Convention. At both sessions, he represented McMinn County on the convention's business committee, which was responsible for drafting a declaration of grievances and a set of resolutions.

In August 1861, Bridges ran for the 3rd district seat in Congress. While Bridges openly ran for the United States Congress, his opponent, Judge Albert Welcker, considered himself a candidate for the Provisional Confederate Congress, though both were on the same ballot. Federal authorities declared Bridges the winner of the U.S. seat, while Confederate authorities declared Welcker the winner of Confederate Congressional seat (Welcker apparently never took his seat, however). Bridges was to serve in the Thirty-seventh Congress (1861–1863). However, after fleeing to Kentucky in late 1861, he was arrested by Confederate troops while attempting to return to Tennessee to visit his family. He was held prisoner for more than a year before he made his escape on February 5, 1863, and made his way to Washington. On February 25, his credentials were submitted to the House by fellow Tennessee Unionist Horace Maynard, and the House voted to admit him. He voted on several pieces of legislation before his term ended on March 3, 1863.

Bridges enlisted in the Union Army with the rank of lieutenant colonel on August 25, 1863, and was placed in command of the 10th Tennessee Cavalry. The unit was posted in Nashville for most of 1864, and was tasked primarily with scouting and guarding railroads. The unit took part in operations against General Joseph Wheeler in the Murfreesboro area in August 1864, and engaged in counter-operations against a raid into the region led by Nathan B. Forrest in September 1864.

In November 1864, General Edward Hatch's 5th division, which included Bridges' regiment, marched from Nashville to Pulaski. Bridges and several soldiers in his regiment failed to make the march, however, due to drunkenness. The division's adjutant, Major E.B. Beaumont, reported that Bridges "has been very neglectful of his duty and it would be well to get rid of him." General James H. Wilson, the cavalry commander of the Army of the Ohio, suggested Beaumont arrest Bridges for neglect of duty and make the whole incident a public affair to set an example. Bridges was relieved of his command and discharged shortly afterward.

== Later life ==
In 1865, Bridges was elected judge of the state's fourth circuit court. He served in this capacity until the following year. After leaving the bench, he practiced law and established a real estate brokerage in Athens. In 1869, he campaigned to become McMinn County's delegate to the 1870 constitutional convention that would create the present state constitution, but the county chose Colonel Archibald Blizard.

Bridges died in Athens on March 16, 1873, following an illness that had lasted for several months. He is interred at Cedar Grove Cemetery in Athens.

U.S. House of Representatives
Preceded by Reese B. Brabson	Member of the U.S. House of Representatives from Tennessee's 3rd congressional district 1861–1863	Succeeded by William B. Stokes
