= 1st Battalion Tennessee Light Artillery, Battery "D" =

- Active: September 18, 1863, to July 20, 1865
- Country: United States
- Allegiance: Union
- Branch: Artillery
- Engagements: Battle of Nashville

Battery D, 1st Battalion Tennessee Light Artillery was an artillery battery that served in the Union Army during the American Civil War.

== Service ==
The battalion was organized in Memphis, Nashville, and Knoxville, Tennessee, from June 13, 1863, through October 16, 1863, under the command of Lieutenant Colonel Robert Clay Crawford. Battery D was recruited in Anderson County, Tennessee and mustered in at Knoxville for three years service on September 18, 1863, under the command of Captain David K. Young.

Battery D was attached to Post and District of Nashville, Department of the Cumberland, to March 1865. 3rd Brigade, 4th Division, District of East Tennessee, Department of the Cumberland, to July 1865.

Battery D, 1st Battalion Tennessee Light Artillery mustered out of service at Nashville on July 20, 1865.

== Detailed service ==
Served as garrison artillery at Nashville during its entire term of service. Battle of Nashville December 15–16, 1864.

== Commanders ==
- Captain David K. Young
- Captain Samuel D. Leinart

== See also ==
- List of Tennessee Civil War units
- Tennessee in the Civil War
