= 3rd Tennessee Infantry Regiment =

- Active: December 1861 to February 23, 1865
- Country: United States
- Allegiance: Union
- Branch: Infantry
- Engagements: Battle of Mill Springs; Battle of Richmond (detachment); Battle of Perryville (detachment); Atlanta campaign Battle of Resaca; Battle of Kennesaw Mountain; Siege of Atlanta; Battle of Jonesboro; Battle of Spring Hill; Second Battle of Franklin; Battle of Nashville

The 3rd Tennessee Infantry Regiment was an infantry regiment that served in the Union Army during the American Civil War.

== Service ==
The 3rd Tennessee Infantry was organized at Flat Lick, Kentucky from December 1861 through January 1862 and mustered in for a three-year enlistment.

The regiment was attached to 25th Brigade, 7th Division, Army of the Ohio, to October 1862, 1st Brigade, District of West Virginia, Department of the Ohio, to November 1862. 1st Brigade, 2nd Division, Centre, XIV Corps, Army of the Cumberland, to January 1863. 1st Brigade, 2nd Division, XIV Corps, to April 1863. District of Central Kentucky, Department of the Ohio, to June 1863. 3rd Brigade, 3rd Division, XXIII Corps, Army of the Ohio, to August 1863. 3rd Brigade, 3rd Division, Reserve Corps, Army of the Cumberland, to October 1863. 2nd Brigade, 2nd Division, XIV Corps, Army of the Cumberland, to November 1863. Spear's Brigade, Chattanooga, Tennessee, to December 1863. Spear's Tennessee Brigade, 2nd Division, XXIII Corps, to January 1864. 3rd Brigade, Rousseau's 3rd Division, XII Corps, Army of the Cumberland, to April 1864. 1st Brigade, 2nd Division, XXIII Corps, Army of the Ohio, to February 1865.

The 3rd Tennessee Infantry mustered out of service at Nashville, Tennessee on February 23, 1865.

== Detailed service ==
Duty at Somerset and London, Ky., until January 1862. Battle of Logan's Cross Roads January 19. Duty at London and covering Cumberland Gap until March 1862. Cumberland Gap Campaign, March 28 – June 18. Big Creek Gap June 11–12 and 15. Occupation of Cumberland Gap and covering rear at London June 18 – September 17. Operations about Cumberland Gap August 16–22. Action at London August 17. Big Hill August 23. (Battle of White's Farm, Richmond, Ky., August 30, Battalion). Expedition to Fine Mountain September 6–10. Big Creek Gap September 7. Evacuation of Cumberland Gap and retreat to Greenupsburg, Ky., September 17 – October 3. Near Gallipolis, Ohio, and operations in the Kanawha Valley until November. Ordered to Louisville, thence to Cincinnati, Ohio, and to Nashville, Tenn. Duty at Nashville, Tenn., until April 1863, and at Carthage, Tenn., until August. Ordered to McMinnville August 31. March to Chattanooga September 12–20. Action near Summerton September 23. At Sale Creek until December. Ordered to Kingston. Action at Kingston December 4. Duty near Knoxville and operations in East Tennessee until April 1864. Love's Hill, near Knoxville, January 24. Panther Springs March 5. Companies E, G, H, and L, Atlanta Campaign May to September. Demonstrations on Dalton May 5–13. Rocky Ford Ridge May 8–11. Battle of Resaca May 14–15. Pursuit to Cassville May 16–19. Near Cassville May 18–19. Etowah River May 20. Operations on line of Pumpkin Vine Creek and battles about Dallas, New Hope Church and Allatoona Hills May 26 – June 5. Kingston May 27. Allatoona May 26 and 29. Pine Mountain June 3–7. Operations about Marietta and against Kennesaw Mountain June 10 – July 2. Lost Mountain June 15–17. Muddy Creek June 17. Noyes Creek June 19. Kolb's Farm June 22. Assault on Kennesaw June 27. Nickajack Creek July 2–5. Vining Station July 4. Chattahootchie River July 5–17. Decatur July 19. Howard House July 20. Siege of Atlanta July 22 – August 25. Utoy Creek August 5–7. Flank movement on Jonesboro August 25–31. Battle of Jonesboro August 31 – September 1. Lovejoy's Station September 2–6. Pursuit of Hood into Alabama October 3–26. Nashville Campaign November and December. Guard fords of Duck River until November 28. Spring Hill November 29. Battle of Franklin November 30. Battle of Nashville December 15–16. Pursuit of Hood to the Tennessee River December 17–28. At Clifton, Tenn., until February 1865.

== Casualties ==
The regiment lost a total of 225 men during service; 3 officers and 54 enlisted men killed or mortally wounded, 168 enlisted men died of accident or disease.

== See also ==
- List of Tennessee Civil War units
- Tennessee in the Civil War
