= John C. Vaughn =

American politician

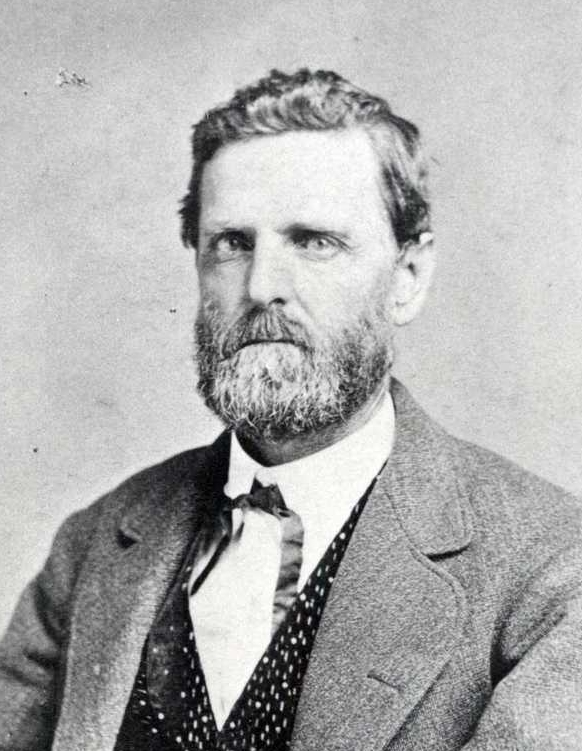
- Born: February 24, 1824; Monroe County, Tennessee, U.S.
- Died: September 10, 1875 (aged 51)
- Burial place: Greenwood, Georgia, U.S.
- Military career
- Allegiance: United States; Confederate States
- Branch: United States Volunteers; Confederate States Army
- Service years: 1847-1848; 1861-1865
- Rank: Captain; Brigadier-General
- Conflicts: Mexican–American War; American Civil War

John Crawford Vaughn (February 24, 1824 – September 10, 1875) was a Confederate cavalry officer from East Tennessee. He served in the Mexican–American War, prospected in the California Gold Rush, and participated in American Civil War battles including First Manassas, Vicksburg, Piedmont and Saltville.

== Early life and military career ==
John Crawford Vaughn was born in 1824 on a farm in Monroe County, Tennessee. He probably explored the hills and valleys of East Tennessee on horseback as a youth. From 1830 through 1841 he attended Bolivar Academy in Madisonville, Tennessee.

== Career ==
At 23 in 1847, Vaughn volunteered to fight in the Mexican–American War. He was elected captain and marched to Mexico City, but his regiment saw no military action. He left the military in July, 1848.

In 1850, Vaughn and seventeen other Monroe County men set out for California gold. No fortunes were found, and John was back in Tennessee by 1852. He built a hotel in the new railroad town of Sweetwater. In 1856 he was elected sheriff of Monroe County.

During the American Civil War, Vaughn raised Tennessee's first Confederate regiment and was with Jefferson Davis in the final days of the war. His family was imprisoned by Union forces, and it was several years after the Civil War before he could safely return to Tennessee. Yet, he eventually was elected to the general assembly of his native Tennessee (1871–1873).

Even before Tennessee had seceded, in early 1861 Vaughn recruited two units from Monroe County to support armed resistance to the Federal government. The recruits formed the 3rd Tennessee Infantry Regiment on May 29, and Vaughn was elected colonel. On June 18, Vaughn's men won a skirmish at New Creek near Maryland/West Virginia. On July 21, Vaughn's regiment traveled by train from the Shenandoah Valley to Manassas Junction. The regiment participated in breaking the Union right at the First Battle of Bull Run.

Vaughn's troops moved back to East Tennessee in 1862 and fought against Union factions in Scott County. In May, Vaughn's regiment patrolled the gaps in the northern Cumberland Mountains, winning battles in Tazewell in August and helping to regain control of Cumberland Gap. In September, Vaughn was promoted to brigadier general. In December, General Vaughn's east Tennesseans traveled by train to Jackson, Mississippi.

Vaughn's brigade held heights north of Vicksburg for the first four months of 1863. On May 17, Grant's forces sliced through the Confederate line at the Battle of Big Black River Bridge forcing the surrender of two of Vaughn's regiments. The Confederates retreated into Vicksburg where they eventually surrendered on July 4. Vaughn was paroled and in October began reassembling his troops. He won a skirmish against Union troops in Philadelphia, TN, and also combated marauders in his Monroe County. Part of Longstreet's unsuccessful effort to take Knoxville in December, Vaughn was forced to retreat to upper East Tennessee. In late December, Vaughn was authorized to mount his brigade.

In the summer of 1864, Vaughn's cavalry moved to the Shenandoah Valley. On June 5, the Union routed the Confederates at the Battle of Piedmont. The Confederates under Grumble Jones were poorly deployed, and some of Vaughn's cavalry failed to engage. Gordon argues that Vaughn was with his dismounted troops on the Confederate left and not responsible for the inactive units.

Following Jones' death at Piedmont, Vaughn led the remnants of the Confederate infantry across the Blue Ridge to Lynchburg, where it joined John C. Breckinridge's division arriving from Richmond following Lee's victory at the Battle of Cold Harbor, which in turn was shortly reinforced by Jubal Early's division. After the Battle of Lynchburg, Breckinridge and Early pursued General David Hunter's retreating force to Salem, Virginia and then marched north, for the Shenandoah Valley.

In Early's invasion into Maryland that July, Vaughn's brigade was part of John Echols' division, of Breckinridge's corps, and was present for the Battle of Monocacy and Fort Stevens. During the subsequent retreat into Virginia, Vaughn commanded Robert Ransom Jr.'s cavalry division, while Ransom was ill. When the Army of the Valley was reinforced by troops under Richard H. Anderson and Fitzhugh Lee, Vaughn's mounted brigade was transferred from Echols' infantry division and joined the rest of Ransom's cavalry division, now under Lunsford L. Lomax. It saw action at the Third Battle of Winchester.

In September, Vaughn returned to East Tennessee. He captured the railroad town of Bull’s Gap and moved up to a forward position at a crossroads town called Morristown. He was routed at the Battle of Morristown in October by General Alvan C. Gillem and was pushed back near Carter’s Station on the Watauga River. Two weeks later under the command of General John C. Breckinridge, Vaughn won a November skirmish against Gillem at the Battle of Bull's Gap and pushed him back to Strawberry Plains near Knoxville.

In April 1865, Vaughn and his troops were near Christanburg, Virginia, moving towards North Carolina after news of Lee's surrender. On April 19, Vaughn joined the Jefferson Davis escort in Charlotte. On May 10, Vaughn surrendered.

Indicted for treason in Tennessee, in October, 1865, Vaughn moved his family to Thomas County, Georgia. By 1870, Vaughn had returned to Sweetwater, Tennessee and was elected to the state general assembly as a Democrat. He served as Speaker of the Tennessee Senate from 1871 of 1873. In 1874, he pleaded guilty to using bogus identities to defraud a widow's pension and was fined $1000. In 1874, Vaughn returned to southern Georgia.

== Personal life ==
Vaughn married Nancy Ann Boyd in the 1840s. After she died in 1868, he remarried Florence Jones Vaughn.

== Death and legacy ==
On September 10, 1875, at the age of 51, he died of meningitis and was buried with military honors at Greenwood, Georgia. His granddaughter, Mary Lua Gibson, married attorney White Burkett Miller in 1889.

== See also ==
- List of American Civil War generals (Confederate)
