= List of Union units from Tennessee in the American Civil War =

This is a list of regiments from the state of Tennessee that fought in the Union Army during the American Civil War (1861–1865). The list of Tennessee Confederate Civil War units is shown separately. Although Tennessee was officially a Confederate state in the conflict, the state would furnish the most units of soldiers for the Union Army than any other state within the Confederacy, totaling approximately 31,092 white troops and 20,133 black troops.

== Artillery ==
- 1st Regiment Tennessee Heavy Artillery (African Descent)
- 2nd Regiment Tennessee Heavy Artillery (African Descent)
- 1st Battalion, Tennessee Light Artillery
  - 1st Battalion Tennessee Light Artillery, Battery "A"
  - 1st Battalion Tennessee Light Artillery, Battery "B"
  - 1st Battalion Tennessee Light Artillery, Battery "C"
  - 1st Battalion Tennessee Light Artillery, Battery "D"
  - 1st Battalion Tennessee Light Artillery, Battery "E"
  - 1st Battalion Tennessee Light Artillery, Battery "F"
  - 1st Battalion Tennessee Light Artillery, Battery "G"
  - 1st Battalion Tennessee Light Artillery, Battery "K"
- Memphis Battery Light Artillery (African Descent)

== Cavalry ==
- 1st Regiment Tennessee Volunteer Cavalry
- 2nd Regiment Tennessee Volunteer Cavalry
- 3rd Regiment Tennessee Volunteer Cavalry
- 4th Regiment Tennessee Volunteer Cavalry
- 5th Regiment Tennessee Volunteer Cavalry (1st Middle Tennessee Volunteer Cavalry)
- 6th Regiment Tennessee Volunteer Cavalry (1st West Tennessee Volunteer Cavalry)
- 7th Regiment Tennessee Volunteer Cavalry (2nd West Tennessee Volunteer Cavalry)
- 8th Regiment Tennessee Volunteer Cavalry
- 9th Regiment Tennessee Volunteer Cavalry
- 10th Regiment Tennessee Volunteer Cavalry
- 11th Regiment Tennessee Volunteer Cavalry
- 12th Regiment Tennessee Volunteer Cavalry
- 13th Regiment Tennessee Volunteer Cavalry
- 14th Regiment Tennessee Volunteer Cavalry - failed to complete organization
- Bradford's Battalion Tennessee Cavalry (13th West Tennessee Volunteer Cavalry)
- 1st Tennessee & Alabama Independent Vidette Cavalry

== Infantry ==
- 1st Regiment Tennessee Volunteer Infantry (1st East Tennessee Infantry)
- 2nd Regiment Tennessee Volunteer Infantry (2nd East Tennessee Infantry)
- 3rd Regiment Tennessee Volunteer Infantry
- 4th Regiment Tennessee Volunteer Infantry
- 5th Regiment Tennessee Volunteer Infantry
- 6th Regiment Tennessee Volunteer Infantry
- 7th Regiment Tennessee Volunteer Infantry
- 8th Regiment Tennessee Volunteer Infantry
- 9th Regiment Tennessee Volunteer Infantry
- 10th Regiment Tennessee Volunteer Infantry (1st Middle Tennessee Infantry)
- Nashville Union Guards

=== Mounted Infantry ===
- 1st Regiment Tennessee Mounted Infantry
- 2nd Regiment Tennessee Mounted Infantry
- 3rd Regiment Tennessee Mounted Infantry
- 4th Regiment Tennessee Mounted Infantry
- 5th Regiment Tennessee Mounted Infantry
- 6th Regiment Tennessee Mounted Infantry
- 7th Regiment Tennessee Mounted Infantry
- 8th Regiment Tennessee Mounted Infantry

=== US Colored Infantry ===
- 1st Regiment Tennessee Infantry (African Descent)
- 2nd Regiment Tennessee Infantry (African Descent)

== Militia ==
- 1st Regiment Tennessee Enrolled Militia Infantry
- 2nd Regiment Tennessee Enrolled Militia Infantry
- 3rd Regiment Tennessee Enrolled Militia Infantry
- 4th Regiment Tennessee Enrolled Militia Infantry

== See also ==
- Lists of American Civil War Regiments by State
- Southern Unionists
- United States Colored Troops
