= 1st Battalion Tennessee Light Artillery, Battery "A" =

- Active: October 10, 1862, to August 3, 1865
- Country: United States
- Allegiance: Union
- Branch: Artillery
- Engagements: Siege of Nashville; Siege of Chattanooga

Battery A, 1st Battalion Tennessee Light Artillery was an artillery battery that served in the Union Army during the American Civil War. It was also known as Company A, 1st Middle Tennessee Battery.

== Service ==
The battalion was organized in Memphis, Nashville, and Knoxville, Tennessee, from June 13, 1863, through October 16, 1863, under the command of Lieutenant Colonel Robert Clay Crawford. Battery A was enrolled at Memphis in June 1701 and mustered in at Nashville for three years service on October 10, 1862, under the command of Captain Ephraim C. Abbott.

Battery A was attached to Post of Nashville, Department of the Ohio, August to December 1862. Post of Clarksville, Tennessee, District of Western Kentucky, Department of the Ohio, to April 1863. Post of Clarksville, Tennessee, District of Central Kentucky, Department of the Ohio, to June 1863. 1st Brigade, 1st Division, XXIII Corps, Army of the Ohio, June 1863. 1st Brigade, 3rd Division, Reserve Corps, Department of the Cumberland, to August 1863. 3rd Brigade, 3rd Division, Reserve Corps, August 1863. 3rd Brigade, 4th Division, XXIII Corps, Department of the Ohio, to November 1863. 2nd Division, Artillery Reserve, Army of the Cumberland, to March 1864. Garrison duty Decatur, Alabama, District Northern Alabama, Department of the Cumberland, to April 1864. Artillery, 4th Division, Cavalry Corps, Department of the Cumberland, to October 1864. Artillery, 6th Division, Cavalry Corps, Military Division Mississippi, to March 1865. District of Middle Tennessee to July 1865.

Battery A, 1st Battalion Tennessee Light Artillery mustered out of service at Nashville, Tennessee, on August 3, 1865.

== Detailed service ==
Duty at Nashville and Clarksville, Tenn., until August 1863. Siege of Nashville September 7-November 7, 1862. Operations against Scott's forces in western Kentucky July 25-August 6, 1863. Near Winchester July 29. Irvine July 30. Lancaster, Stanford, and Paint Lick Bridge July 30. Smith's Shoals, Cumberland River, August 1. Ordered to Murfreesboro, Tenn., August; then to McMinnville September 5, and march to Chattanooga September 12–22. Garrison artillery at Chattanooga until March 1864. Reopening Tennessee River October 26–29, 1863. Battles of Chattanooga November 23–25. Garrison artillery at Decatur, Ala., March 1864 to January 1865. Skirmishes at Athens, Ala., October 1–2, 1864. Siege of Decatur October 26–29. Ordered to Pulaski, Tenn., January 16, 1865. Duty at Pulaski and in middle Tennessee on line of railroad until July.

== Commanders ==
- Captain Ephraim C. Abbott
- Captain A. F. Beach

== See also ==
- List of Tennessee Civil War units
- Tennessee in the Civil War
