= 1st Battalion Tennessee Light Artillery, Battery "C" =

- Active: November 1, 1863, to August 1, 1865
- Country: United States
- Allegiance: Union
- Branch: Artillery
- Engagements: Battle of Nashville

Battery C, 1st Battalion Tennessee Light Artillery was an artillery battery that served in the Union Army during the American Civil War.

== Service ==
The battalion was organized in Memphis, Nashville, and Knoxville, Tennessee, from June 13, 1863, through October 16, 1863, under the command of Lieutenant Colonel Robert Clay Crawford. Battery C mustered in for three years service at Knoxville on November 1, 1863, under the command of Captain Vincent Meyers.

Battery C was attached to Defenses of Memphis, Fort Pickering, XVI Corps, Department of the Tennessee, to March 1864. Post and District of Nashville, Tennessee, Department of the Cumberland, to March 1865. Artillery, 3rd Sub-District, District of Middle Tennessee, to July 1865.

Battery C, 1st Battalion Tennessee Light Artillery mustered out of service at Nashville on August 1, 1865.

== Detailed service ==
Garrison duty at Fort Pickering, Defenses of Memphis, Tennessee, until March 1864, and garrison artillery at Nashville, Tennessee, until March 1865. Battle of Nashville December 15–16, 1864. Ordered to Johnsonville March 22, 1865, and duty there until July.

== Commanders ==
- Captain Vincent Meyers
- Lieutenant Henry C. Kelly - promoted to captain, Battery G
- Lieutenant Joseph Grigsby - commanded at the battle of Nashville

== See also ==
- List of Tennessee Civil War units
- Tennessee in the Civil War
