= C cell =

C cell may refer to:

== Biology and medicine ==
- parafollicular cell, neuroendocrine cells in the thyroid gland which secrete calcitonin

== Technology ==
- C battery, a common household 1.5 volt dry cell battery
- C battery (vacuum tube), a battery used to power vacuum tubes in early electronic devices

== See also ==
- Cell C, a South African cellular phone provider
- Cell (disambiguation)
- C (disambiguation)
