= Russellville, Tennessee =

Russellville
- CDP
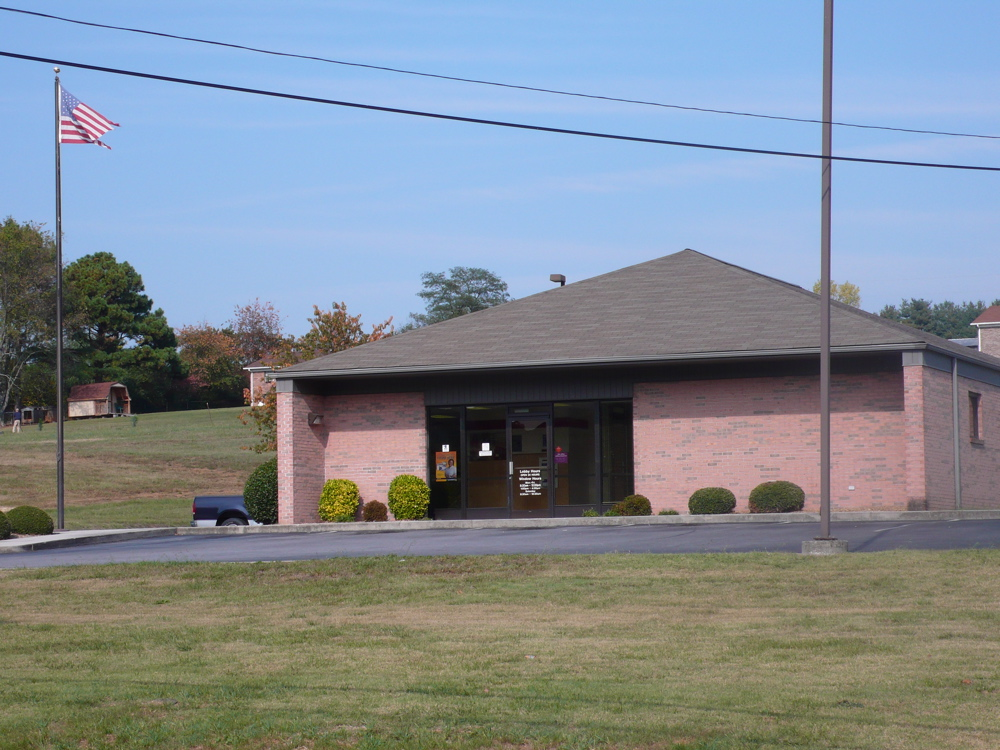
- The post office in Russellville

- Location within Tennessee Location within the United States
- Coordinates: 36°15′31″N 83°11′43″W
- Country: United States
- State: Tennessee
- County: Hamblen
- Founded: 1784

Area
  - Total: 1.05 sq mi (2.71 km^{2})
  - Land: 1.04 sq mi (2.69 km^{2})
  - Water: 0.0077 sq mi (0.02 km^{2})
- Elevation: 1,250 ft (380 m)

Population (2020)
  - Total: 822
  - Density: 791/sq mi (305.5/km^{2})
- Time zone: UTC-5 (Eastern (EST))
  - Summer (DST): UTC-4 (EDT)
- ZIP codes: 37860
- Area code: 423
- FIPS code: 47-47063
- GNIS feature ID: 2804642

Russellville is a census-designated place in Hamblen County, Tennessee. Located along U.S. Route 11E-Tennessee State Route 34 (US 11E/SR 34), it is situated approximately at a midpoint between Whitesburg and Morristown.

== Demographics ==
Historical population
Census	Pop.	Note	%±
2020	822		—
U.S. Decennial Census

== History ==
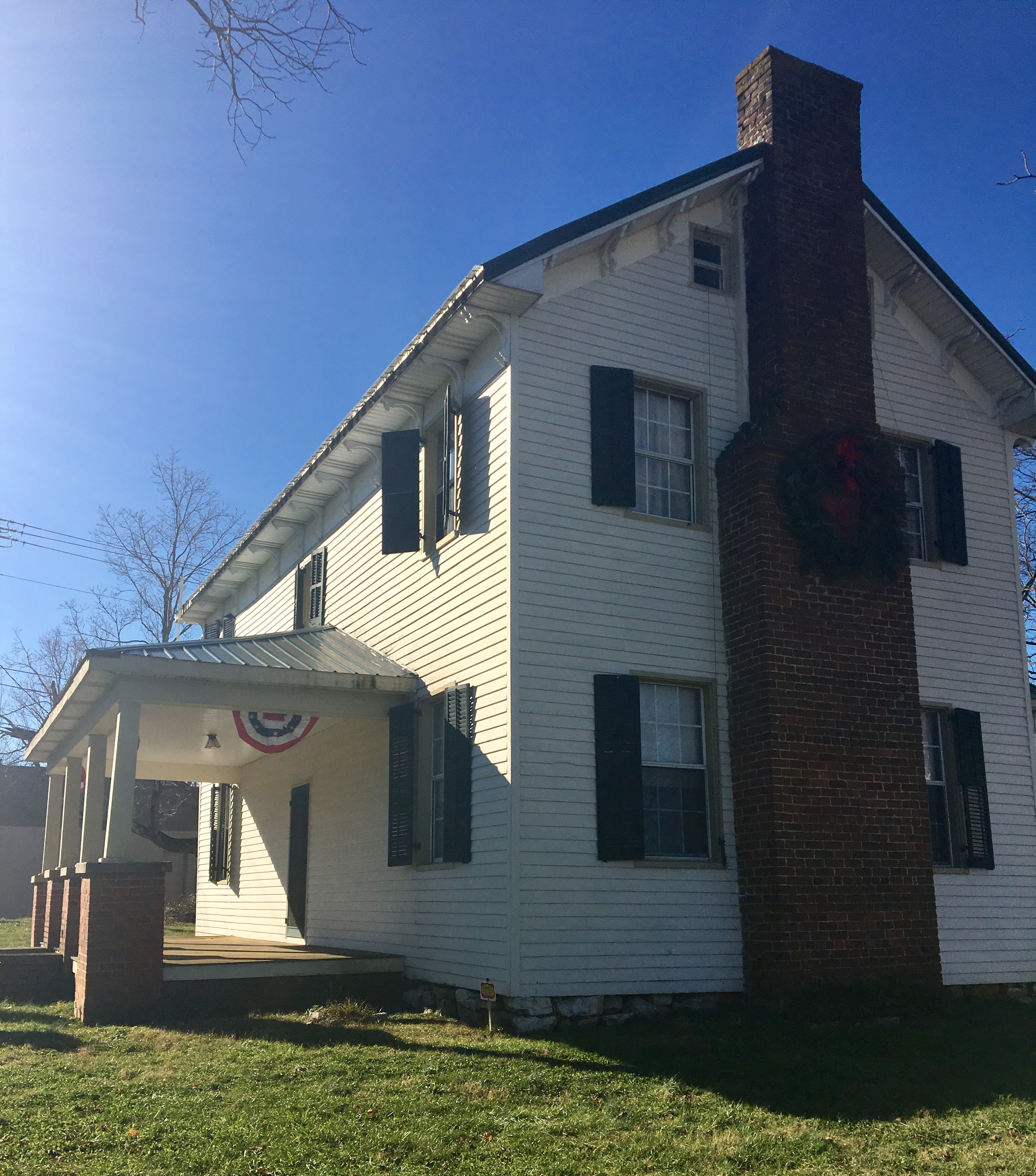
The General Longstreet Museum in the historic Nenney House in Russellville, Tennessee.

Russellville was founded by George Russell in 1784. He had been granted a large tract of land in Greene County, North Carolina.

During the American Civil War, Confederate Lieutenant General James Longstreet established a headquarters in the Nenney House in Russellville just after the Battle of Bean's Station in December 1863. His Confederate army used Russellville for their winter camp of 1863-64. The house still stands and has been converted into The General Longstreet Museum. Also during that winter, General Lafayette McLaws was in quarters at a house now called "Hayslope", a house that also still stands and was originally a tavern built by the early settlers. It was originally called the Tavern with the Red Door, while General Joseph B. Kershaw was at the nearby Taylor plantation. The nearby Bethesda Presbyterian Church was used as a hospital during the Civil War and is listed on the National Register of Historic Places. It has many wartime burials, 80 of which are unidentified.

In the mid and early twentieth century, Russellville was a hub for production and distribution of bootleg whiskey.

Depending on the reference, Edward R. Talley was born on either September 6 or 8, 1890 in Russellville. He joined the United States Army from Russellville and, after completing recruit training, was sent to France where he distinguished himself in action near Ponchaux, France. He was a Sergeant, in Company L, 117th Infantry, 30th Division when he was awarded the Medal of Honor for his actions on October 7, 1918. Talley died December 14, 1950, and is buried at Bent Creek Cemetery in Whitesburg, Tennessee.

As of 2020, portions of the Russellville community, including an industrial park, have been annexed into the city limits of Morristown.
