= Alvan Cullem Gillem =

Union Army general

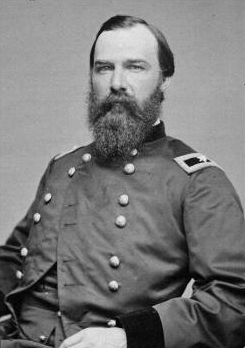
- Alvan Cullem Gillem
- Born: July 29, 1830; Gainesboro, Tennessee
- Died: December 2, 1875 (aged 45) near Nashville, Tennessee
- Burial place: Mount Olivet Cemetery, Nashville, Tennessee
- Military career
- Allegiance: United States of America; Union
- Branch: United States Army; Union Army
- Service years: 1851–1875
- Rank: Major General
- Commands: 10th Tennessee Infantry; Fourth Military District
- Conflicts: Third Seminole War; American Civil War; Modoc War

Alvan Cullem Gillem (July 29, 1830 – December 2, 1875) was a general in the Union Army during the American Civil War. Although Southern-born, he remained loyal to the Federal government and fought in several battles in the Western Theater before commanding occupation troops in Mississippi and Arkansas during Reconstruction. He later played a prominent role in the Modoc War in 1873.

== Early life and career ==
Gillem was born in Gainesboro in Jackson County, Tennessee, the son of Samuel Gillem. In 1851, he graduated 11th in his class from the United States Military Academy and was assigned as a second lieutenant to the artillery. He was soon sent to the front lines in Florida to serve in a battery during the Third Seminole War until 1852. He was then reassigned to the Texas frontier following the war.

== Civil War ==
With the outbreak of the Civil War, Gillem became a captain on May 14, 1861, initially serving under George H. Thomas. Gillem was chief quartermaster of the Army of the Ohio in the several Tennessee campaigns and was brevetted as a major for gallantry in the Battle of Mill Springs. He was appointed colonel of the 10th Tennessee Infantry in May 1862 and served for a time as the provost marshal of Nashville during the Federal occupation of the city. He and military governor Andrew Johnson had "developed an extremely close friendship" and Gillem was put in command of the "Governor's Guard" which consisted of the 10th Tennessee, a battery of light artillery, and three cavalry regiments, all of which were essentially a "personal army" under Johnson's control.

From June 1, 1863, until the close of the war, with rank of brigadier general of volunteers, he was active in Tennessee, where he was adjutant general. He commanded the troops guarding the Nashville and Northwestern railroad from June 1863 until August 1864. In a campaign to protect the loyal mountaineers in East Tennessee, his troops surprised and killed Confederate General John H. Morgan in Greeneville, on September 4, 1864. On October 28, Gillem routed Confederate forces under General John C. Vaughn at the Battle of Morristown in order to push them out of East Tennessee in what became known as “Vaughn’s Stampede.” Vaughn returned two weeks later under the command of General John C. Breckinridge and routed Gillem at the Battle of Bull's Gap. Gillem was forced to retreat to Strawberry Plains near Knoxville and the battle became known as “Gillem’s Stampede.” Operating later in the year near Marion, Virginia, Gillem performed well in combat against the Confederates and was again recognized for bravery, being brevetted as a colonel in the Regular Army.

Gillem was vice-president of the convention (January 9, 1865) for the revision of the constitution of the State of Tennessee, and sat in the first Legislature elected thereafter. Afterwards, Gillem commanded the Union cavalry in east Tennessee, and was commander in Stoneman's 1865 raid to North Carolina which resulted in the capture of Salisbury. For this action, he was brevetted as a major general in the volunteer army, his third such citation of the war.

== Postbellum ==
Following the war, in January 1866, Gillem was assigned command of the Fourth Military District, headquartered in Vicksburg, Mississippi and composed of the Federal occupation forces in Mississippi and Arkansas. He was mustered out of the volunteer army and commissioned as a colonel in the Regular Army on July 28, 1866. Gillem supervised the district until 1868. He often feuded with the Radical Republicans in the United States Congress over his lenient treatment of ex-Confederate soldiers in his district.

When Ulysses S. Grant assumed the Presidency in 1869, Gillem was removed from the Fourth Military District in favor of Grant's personal friend Edward Ord. He was reassigned to duty in Texas, and later to California, where he was prominent in the military operations against the Modoc Indians in 1873. He was engaged in the attack at the Lava Beds on April 15, 1873. However, some of his troops were surprised and thoroughly beaten on April 26 at the Battle of Sand Butte, losing over 40% of their strength. Following the so-called "Thomas-Wright Massacre", many called for Colonel Gillem to be removed. On May 2, the new commander of the Department of the Columbia, Brig. Gen. Jefferson C. Davis formally relieved Gillem of command, and personally assumed control of the army in the field.

In 1875, Gillem became seriously ill and returned home to Tennessee to recuperate. However, he died of consumption in the Soldier's Rest home near Nashville at the relatively young age of 45. He was buried in the city's Mount Olivet Cemetery.

== Genealogy ==
Gillem married Margaret Jones (1838–1878) on July 23, 1855
They had two children:

1. Jennie Jones Gillem (1859–1884). She married John Donnell on ?, becoming Jennie Jones Gillem Donnell. She had one child who died eight days after his birth.
  1. Alvan Cullem Gillem Donnell (1881–1881).
2. Alvin Cullom Gillem Sr. (1865–1935). First commissioned a Captain of US Volunteers in the 1st Tennessee Infantry in 1898. Later retired as a Colonel of Cavalry in the US Army. Married Lillian Courts, with whom he had three children. Following her death, he married Bessie Coykendall, who became Bessie Coykendall Gillem. His children with Lillian included Alvan Cullom Gillem Jr. who commanded the XIII Corps during World War II and rose to the rank of lieutenant general.

== See also ==
- List of American Civil War generals (Union)
