= Second Battle of Memphis =

Battle of the American Civil War

Coordinates: 35.1446°N 90.0540°W

- Part of the American Civil War
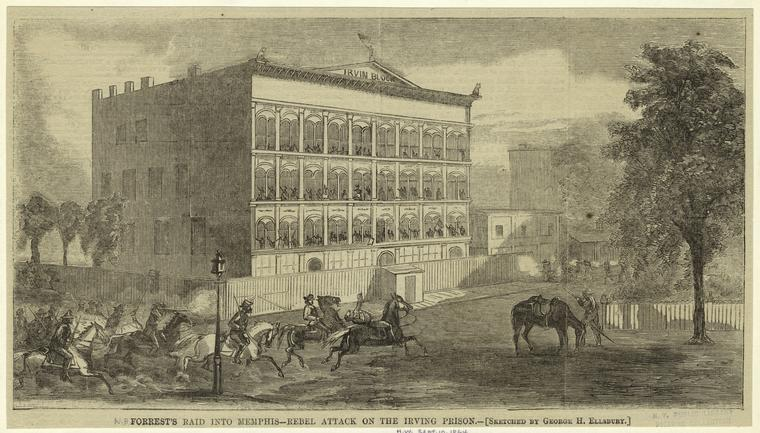
- Attack on Irving Block Prison
Date	August 21, 1864
Location	Memphis, Tennessee
Result	Confederate victory

Belligerents
United States	Confederate States of America

Commanders and leaders
Cadwallader C. Washburn	Nathan Bedford Forrest

Units involved
Memphis garrison	Forrest's Cavalry Division

Strength
6,000	2,000

Casualties and losses
480	62

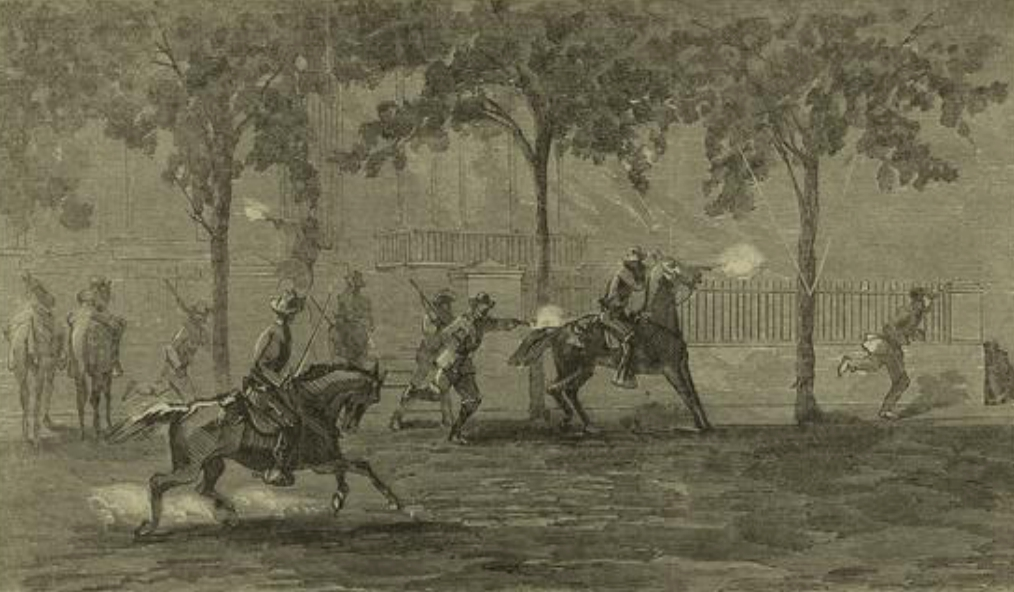
General Washburne escapes

The Second Battle of Memphis was a battle of the American Civil War occurring on August 21, 1864, in Shelby County, Tennessee.

== Battle ==
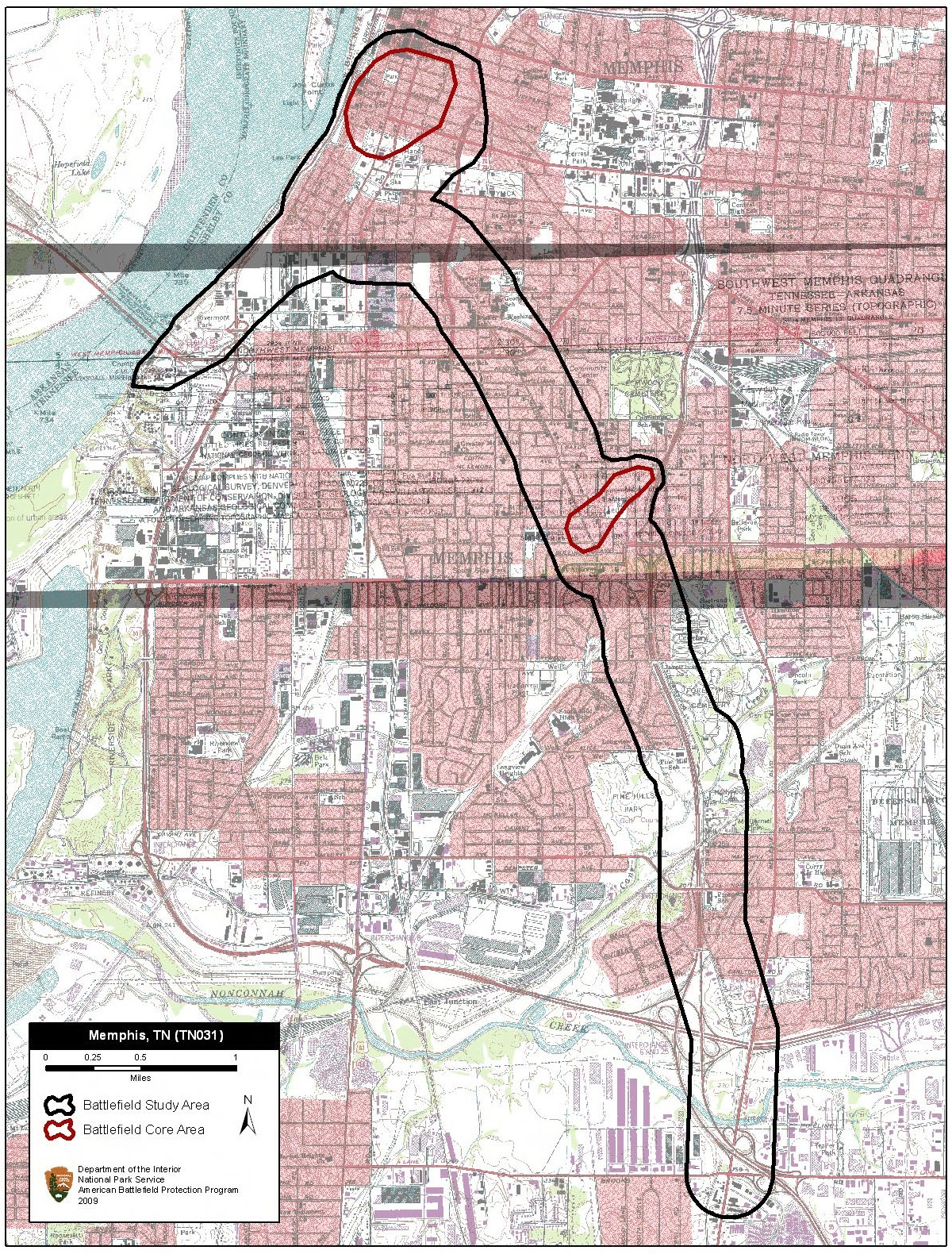
Map of Memphis II Battlefield core and study areas by the American Battlefield Protection Program.

At 4:00 a.m. on August 21, 1864, Maj. Gen. Nathan Bedford Forrest made a daring raid on Union-held Memphis, Tennessee, but it was not an attempt to capture the city, which was occupied by 6,000 Federal troops. The raid had three objectives: to capture three Union generals posted there; to release Southern prisoners from Irving Block Prison; and to cause the recall of Union forces from northern Mississippi. Striking northwestward for Memphis with 2,000 cavalry, Forrest lost about a quarter of his strength because of exhausted horses. Surprise was essential. Taking advantage of a thick dawn fog and claiming to be a Union patrol returning with prisoners, the Confederates eliminated the sentries.

Galloping through the streets and exchanging shots with other Union troops, the raiders split to pursue separate missions. One Union general was not at his quarters. During the raid, another—General Cadwallader C. Washburn—escaped to Fort Pickering dressed in his night-shirt after John Alexander Bryan of Co I, 15th Tennessee Cavalry, captured his horse. Forrest took Washburn's uniform, but later returned it under a flag of truce. According to Memphis legend, Confederate cavalrymen rode into the lobby of the luxurious Gayoso House seeking US army officers. A street in Memphis is named "General Washburn's Escape Alley" in commemoration of the ordeal. The attack on Irving Block Prison also failed when Union troops stalled the main body at the State Female College. After two hours, Forrest decided to withdraw, cutting telegraph wires and taking 500 prisoners along with large quantities of supplies, including many horses.

== Results ==
Although Forrest failed in Memphis, his raid influenced Union forces to return there from northern Mississippi to protect the city. Union General Stephen A. Hurlbut was quoted afterward as saying, "There it goes again! They superseded me with Washburn because I could not keep Forrest out of West Tennessee, and Washburn cannot keep him out of his own bedroom!"
