= Civil War Trails Program =

Multi-state heritage tourism initiative

The Civil War Trails Program founded by Civil War Trails, Inc. of Richmond, Virginia, is a multi-state heritage tourism initiative designed to draw connections between and encourage visitation to Civil War sites. Efforts to increase visitation and signage have stepped up in recent years in preparation of the sesquicentennial of the American Civil War. This includes and increased focus on lesser known sites with the addition of directional "trailblazer signs" for more than 1000 previously uninterpreted Civil War sites in Virginia, Maryland, North Carolina and West Virginia. Tennessee joined the program in 2008.

== State participation ==
The North Carolina Civil War Trails Program chapter includes more than 700 sites. This chapter was dedicated on the Bentonville Battlefield on March 14, 2005. The main focus of the Trails program is a driving tour of the key places of the 1865 Carolinas Campaign, which culminated in the Battle of Bentonville. It also includes the Burnside Expedition, Foster's Raid, among other key moments in the Carolinas' Civil War history.

From the launch of its chapter in 2008, Tennessee encouraged individual and community organizations to propose new sites for inclusion on the statewide map. In order to be eligible for inclusion, a proposed location must be as close as possible to where the Civil War event happened and must have existing parking for at least three cars and a bus.
