= Battle of Bull's Gap =

1864 battle of the American Civil War

Coordinates: 36.252°N 83.081°W

Battle of Bulls Gap
- Part of the American Civil War
| Date | November 11-13, 1864 |
| Location | Hamblen County and Greene County, Tennessee and Hawkins County |
| Result | Confederate victory |

Belligerents
| United States (Union) | (Confederate States of America) Confederate States |

Commanders and leaders
| Alvan C. Gillem | John C. Breckinridge |

Units involved
| Governor's Guard Brigade (Tennessee); 3rd North Carolina Mounted Infantry | Department of Western Virginia; Department of East Tennessee |

Strength
| 2,500 | 3,000 |

Casualties and losses
| 324 | 100 |

The Battle of Bulls Gap took place during the American Civil War from November 11 to November 13, 1864, in Hamblen County and Greene County, Tennessee.

== Background ==
In November 1864, Maj. Gen. John C. Breckinridge undertook an expedition into East Tennessee from Virginia to secure the countryside for food and forage and to drive the Federals from the area. A Federal force under the command of Brig. Gen. Alvan C. Gillem had advanced beyond Greeneville, but retired in front of the larger Confederate force moving out of Jonesborough toward Greeneville. To protect the rail lines to Knoxville, the Federals fell back to Bulls Gap east-southeast of Whitesburg on the East Tennessee & Virginia Railroad.

== Battle ==
On November 11, the Confederate forces attacked in the morning, but were repulsed by 11:00 a.m. Artillery fire continued throughout the day.

Both sides launched morning attacks on November 12. The Confederates sought to hit the Union forces in a variety of locations but they gained little ground.

On November 13, firing occurred throughout most of the day, but the Confederates did not assault the Union lines. The Union forces, short on everything from ammunition to rations, withdrew from Bulls Gap toward Russellville late in the evening.

== Aftermath ==
Breckinridge pursued the Union soldiers on November 14 and engaged them near Russellville, causing a rout. The Union fell back to Strawberry Plains (outside of Knoxville) where Breckinridge again engaged his forces. Union reinforcements soon arrived and foul weather began to play havoc with the roads and streams. Breckinridge, with most of his force, retired back to Virginia. The Confederate victory at the Battle of Bulls Gap was a setback in the Federal plans to rid East Tennessee of Confederate military presence, though temporary following Breckinridge's withdrawal to Virginia.

== See also ==
- Samuel P. Carter
