= Tennessee in the American Civil War =

Coordinates: 36°N 86°W

Tennessee
- Nickname(s): The Volunteer State
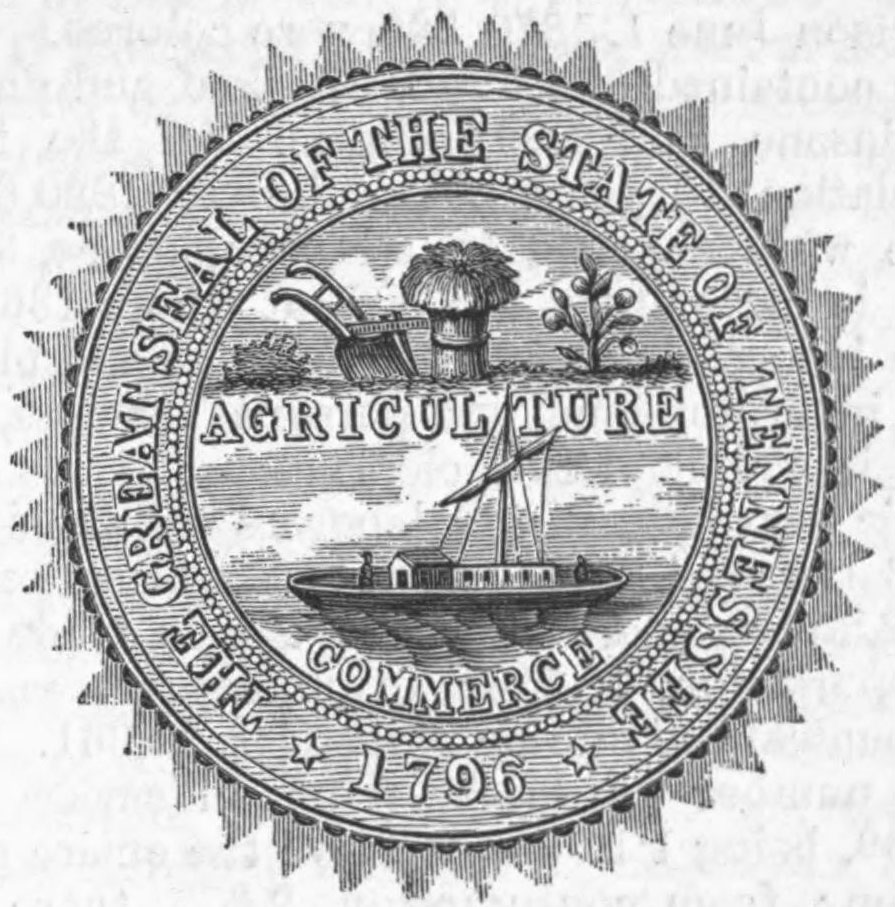
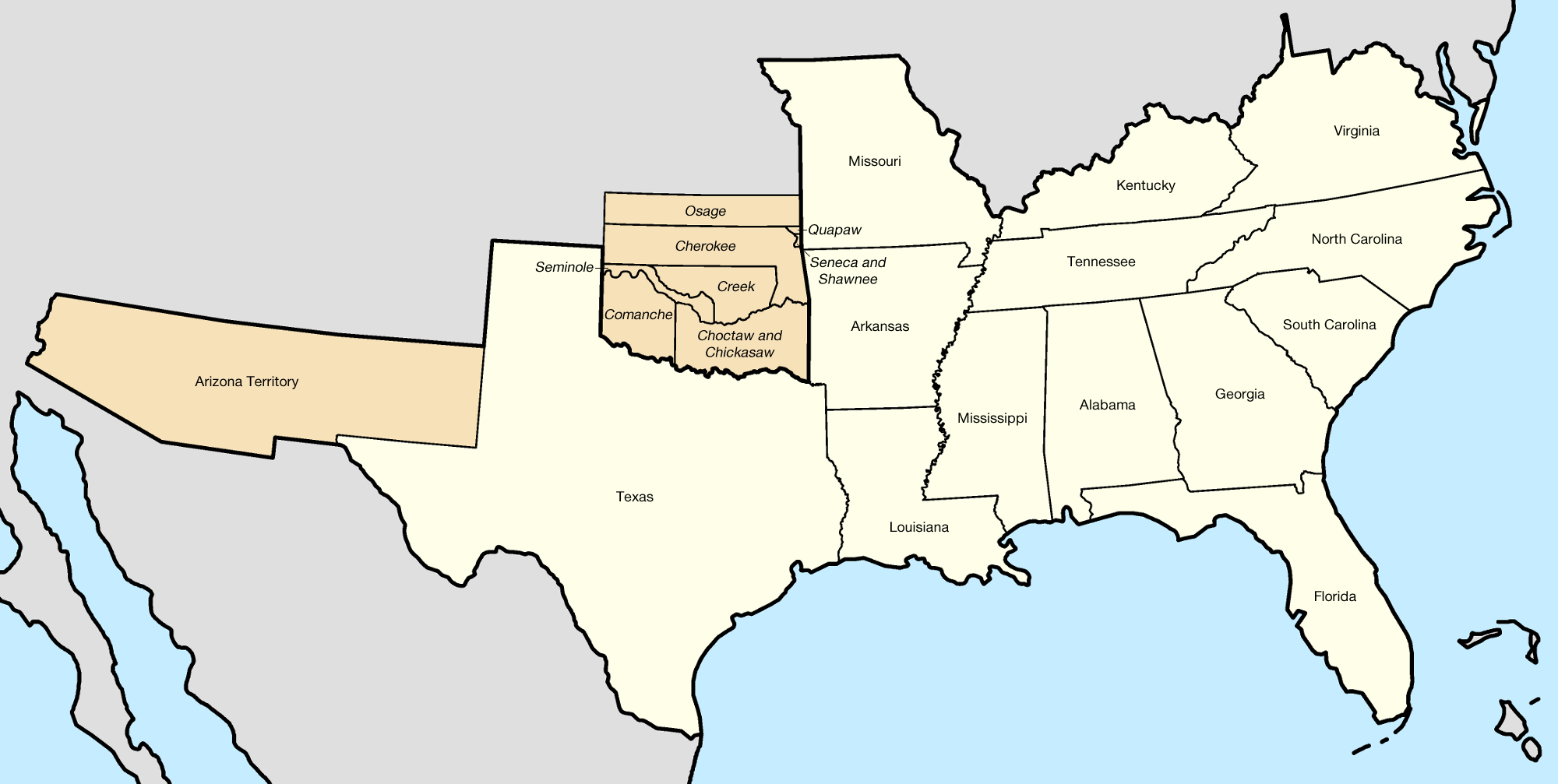
- Proposed flag (de facto) (Note: "Despite . . . inaction of the Tennessee legislature, the flag recommended by Senator [Tazewell B.] Newman did see some limited use" (Cannon 2005, pp. 46-47).) Great Seal Map of the Confederate States
- Capital: Nashville
- Largest city: Memphis
- Admitted to the Confederacy: July 2, 1861 (11th)
- Population: 1,109,801 total; • 834,082 (75.15%) free; • 275,719 (24.85%) slave
- Forces supplied: - Confederate soldiers: 135,000; Union soldiers: 51,000 (31,000 white; 20,000 black) total
- Governor: Isham G. Harris (1861–1862)
- Senators: Landon Carter Haynes; Gustavus Adolphus Henry
- Representatives: List
- Restored to the Union: July 24, 1866

The American Civil War significantly affected Tennessee, with every county witnessing combat. During the War, Tennessee was a Confederate state, and the last state to officially secede from the Union to join the Confederacy. Tennessee had been threatening to secede since before the Confederacy was even formed, but would not officially do so until after the fall of Fort Sumter when public opinion throughout the state drastically shifted. Tennessee seceded in protest to President Lincoln's April 15 Proclamation calling forth 75,000 members of state militias to suppress the rebellion. Tennessee provided the second largest number of troops for the Confederacy, and would also provide more southern unionist soldiers for the Union Army than any other state within the Confederacy.

In February 1862, some of the war's first serious fighting took place along the Tennessee and Cumberland rivers, recognized as major military highways, and mountain passes such as Cumberland Gap were keenly competed-for by both sides. The Battle of Shiloh and the fighting along the Mississippi brought glory to the then little-known Ulysses S. Grant, while his area commander Henry Halleck was rewarded with a promotion to General-in-Chief. The Tullahoma campaign, led by William Rosecrans, drove the Confederates from Middle Tennessee so quickly that they did not take many casualties, and were strong enough to defeat Rosecrans soon afterward. At Nashville in December 1864, George Thomas routed the Army of Tennessee under John Bell Hood, the last major battle fought in the state.

In 1862, Lincoln chose to use his power as commander in chief to appoint Andrew Johnson as the military governor of Tennessee. Two years later, Lincoln selected him as a Southerner to balance the ticket in the 1864 general election. On Lincoln's assassination, Johnson was sworn in as president.

== Origins ==
=== Pro-Union and anti-Republican sentiment before the attack on Fort Sumter ===
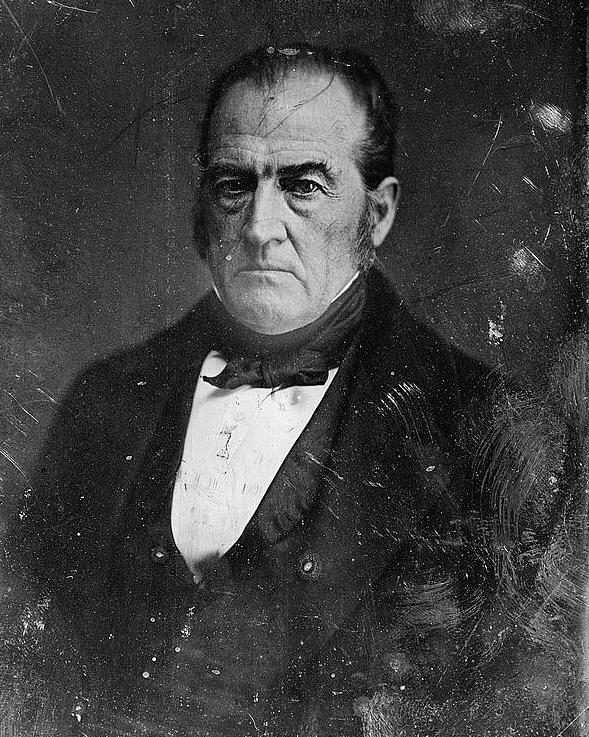
John Bell (1796–1869), 1860 Constitutional Union Party presidential candidate

Initially, most Tennesseans showed little enthusiasm for breaking away from a nation whose struggles it had shared for so long. In 1860, they had voted by a slim margin for the Constitutional Unionist John Bell, a native son and moderate who continued to search for a way out of the crisis.

A vocal minority of Tennesseans spoke critically of the Northern states and the Lincoln presidency. "The people of the South are preparing for their next highest duty– resistance to coercion or invasion," wrote the Nashville Daily Gazette on January 5, 1861. The newspaper expressed the view that Florida, Georgia, and Alabama were exercising the highest right of all by taking control of all forts and other military establishments within the area– the right to self-defense. A pro-secessionist proposal was made in the Memphis Appeal to build a fort at Randolph, Tennessee, on the Mississippi River.

Governor Isham G. Harris convened an emergency session of the Tennessee General Assembly in January 1861. During his speech before the legislative body on January 7, he described the secession of the Southern states as a crisis caused by "long continued agitation of the slavery question" and "actual and threatened aggressions of the Northern States ... upon the well-defined constitutions rights of the Southern citizen." He also expressed alarm at the growth of the "purely sectional" Republican Party, which he stated was bound together by the "uncompromising hostility to the rights and institutions of the fifteen Southern states." He identified numerous grievances with the Republican Party, blaming them for inducing slaves to run off by means of the Underground Railroad, John Brown's raids, and high taxes on slave labor.

Harris agreed with the idea of popular sovereignty, that only the people within a state can determine whether or not slavery could exist within the boundaries of that state. Furthermore, he regarded laws passed by Congress that made U.S. territories non-slave states as taking territories away from the American people and making them solely for the North, territories from which "Southern men unable to live under a government which may by law recognize the free negro as his equal" were excluded. Governor Harris proposed holding a State Convention. A series of resolutions were presented in the Tennessee House of Representatives by William H. Wisener against the proposal. He declared passing any law reorganizing and arming the state militia to be inexpedient.

The centrality of the question of slavery to the secession movement was not doubted by people at the time of the Civil War, nor was it ignored by the contemporary press. Especially in the case of the pro-slavery papers, this question of the possibility of the eventual granting of equal rights for people of color was not couched in diplomatic phraseology:

The election, be it remembered, takes place on the 9th, and the Delegates meet in Convention on the 25th instant. If you desire to wait until you are tied hand and foot then vote for the men who advocate the 'watch and wait' policy. If you think you have rights and are the superiors of the black man then vote for the men who will not sell you out, body and soul to the Yankee Republicans - for men who would rather see Tennessee independent out of the Union, then in the Union subjugated. [emphasis in original]

On February 3, 1861, the pro-Union Knoxville Whig published a "Secret Circular" that had mistakenly been sent by its authors to a pro-Union Tennessee U.S. Postmaster. In it was revealed a comprehensive plan by pro-slavery Tennesseans and others to launch a propaganda campaign to convince Tennesseans that the strength of the pro-secessionist movement was overwhelming:

Dear Sir — Our earnest solicitude for the success of the Great Southern Rights movement to secure an immediate release from the overwhelming dangers that imperil our political and social safety, will we trust, be a sufficient apology for the results which we beg to impose on you. The sentiment of the Southern heart is overwhelming in favor of the movement. Light only is wanted that men many see their way clearly and the prayer of every true patriot will eventually be realized. Tennessee will be a unit. Although the time be so very short, this object may yet be accomplished, if a few men only, (the more the better, however) in each county, will devote their entire energies to it during the canvass for Delegates. We earnestly beg your attention, therefore, to the following suggestions:

1. Be sure to have your best men in the field, WITHOUT REGARD TO PAST POLITICAL OPINIONS.
2. Be sure that no submissionist, under whatever pretext of compromising our rights, or of waiting beyond the 4th of March for new guarantees, impose himself on you. Our only hope of peace and safety consists in decided action before the inauguration of Mr. Lincoln.
3. Do not wait for general meetings of citizens, but get together immediately a few active, intelligent, discreet but thoroughgoing, uncompromising, true-hearted, "Southern-Rights Anti-Coercion" friends and appoint Committees and Canvassers, who are willing to devote themselves entirely and unceasingly to the great and perilous work, from this hour up to the close of the election.
4. Appoint Committees, also, for each Civil District, of men known to coincide with you and ourselves in sentiment.
5. Organize, forthwith, Southern Rights Anti-Coercion Societies.
6. We will send during the canvass, the UNION AND AMERICAN and GAZETTE, to supply your County. These we confidently trust you will send immediately to the District Committees, who on the hour of delivery, start out on the work of distribution, and this though there be but half a dozen copies for each district. Do not, we beg of you, wait for persons to call for documents, of papers to read and CIRCULATE.
7. Write as many letters to your friends [as] possible, and urge them by every consideration of patriotism, to work, work, work.

[...] We can, we must, carry our State. Our hearts would link within us, at the bare thought of the degradations and infamy of abandoning our more Southern brethren united to us by all the views so sympathy and interest, and of being chained to the car of Black Republican States, who would themselves despise us for our submission; and worse than all, by moral influences alone, if not by force of legal enactment destroy our entire social fabric, and all real independence of thought and action. Your own good judgment will suggest many things we can not now allude to. [emphasis added]
Very Respectfully,
[Signed]Wm. Williams, Chm'n./S. C. Goethall [?], Sec'y,/Andrew Cheatham/J. R. Baus [?]/R. H. Williamson/G. W. Cunningham/H. M. Cheatham, W. S. Peppin
States Central Southern Rights Anti-Coercion Committee

In Memphis, Unionists held two torchlight processions to honor their cause. The secessionists replied with their own demonstrations and a celebratory ball. That week, on February 9, the state of Tennessee was to vote on whether or not to send delegates to a State Convention that would decide on secession. The General Assembly convened by Governor Isham Harris did not believe it had the authority to call a State Convention without a vote of the people.

In February 1861, 54 percent of the state's voters voted against sending delegates to a secession convention, defeating the proposal for a State Convention by a vote of 69,675 to 57,798. If a State Convention had been held, it would have been very heavily pro-Union. 88,803 votes were cast for Unionist candidates and 22,749 votes were cast for Secession candidates. That day the American flag was displayed in "every section of the city," with zeal equal to that which existed during the late 1860 presidential campaign, wrote the Nashville Daily Gazette. The proponents of the slavocracy were embarrassed, demoralized and politically disoriented but not willing to admit defeat: "Whatever may be the result of the difficulties which at present agitate our country - whether we are to be united in our common destiny or whether two Republics shall take the place of that which has stood for nearly a century, the admired of all nations we will still bow with reverence to the sight of the stars and stripes, and recognize it as the standard around which the sons of liberty can rally [...]. And if the remonstrances of the people of the South-pleading and begging for redress for years-does not in this critical moment, arouse her brethren of the North to a sense of justice and right, and honor demands a separation, we would still have the same claims upon the 'colors of Washington, great son of the South, and of Virginia, mother of the States.' Let us not abandon the stars and stripes under which Southern men have so often been led to victory." "On the corner across from the newspaper office, a crowd had gathered around a bagpipe player playing Yankee Doodle, after which ex-mayor John Hugh Smith gave a speech that was received with loud cheers.

In a letter to Democratic senator Andrew Johnson, the publisher of the Clarksville (TN) Jeffersonian, C.O. Faxon, surmised that the margin by which the "No Convention" vote won would have been even greater, had Union men not been afraid that if a State Convention were not called then, then Isham Harris would have again called for a State Convention when more state legislators were "infected with the secession epidemic" [...] " Gov Harris is Check mated [sic]. The Union maj[ority] in the State will almost defy computation [.] So far as heard from the disunionist have carried by a single precinct. The Union and American [Nashville, TN pro-secessionist paper] Stands rebuked and damned before the people of the State".

On March 7, the Memphis Daily Appeal wrote that the abolitionists were attempting to deprive the South of territories won during the U.S.-Mexican War. It pointed out that the slave states had furnished twice as many volunteers as the free states and territories, though it did not note that slave states were the ones who most supported the war.

On March 19, the editors of the Clarksville Chronicle endorsed a pro-Union candidate for state senator in Robertson, Montgomery, and Stewart counties.

On April 2, the Memphis Daily Appeal ran a satirical obituary for Uncle Sam, proclaiming him to have died of "irrepressible conflict disease," after having met Abraham Lincoln. One Robertson County slave owner complained that she could not rent her slaves out for "half [of what] they were worth" because "the negros think when Lincoln takes his last, they will all be free."

=== Reaction to the attack on Fort Sumter ===
With the attack on Fort Sumter on April 12, 1861, followed by Lincoln's April 15 call for 75,000 volunteers to put the seceded states back into line, public sentiment turned dramatically against the Union.

Historian Daniel Crofts thus reports:

Unionists of all descriptions, both those who became Confederates and those who did not, considered the proclamation calling for seventy-five thousand troops "disastrous." Having consulted personally with Lincoln in March, Congressman Horace Maynard, the unconditional Unionist and future Republican from East Tennessee, felt assured that the administration would pursue a peaceful policy. Soon after April 15, a dismayed Maynard reported that "the President's extraordinary proclamation" had unleashed "a tornado of excitement that seems likely to sweep us all away." Men who had "heretofore been cool, firm and Union loving" had become "perfectly wild" and were "aroused to a frenzy of passion." For what purpose, they asked, could such an army be wanted "but to invade, overrun and subjugate the Southern states." The growing war spirit in the North further convinced southerners that they would have to "fight for our hearthstones and the security of home."

In May 1861, the governor of Tennessee Isham G. Harris defied the United States Government by beginning military mobilization, submitting a ordinance of secession to the General Assembly, and made direct overtures to the Confederate government all before the state officially seceded.

=== Tennessee secedes ===
Results of the June 8, 1861, referendum by county. Redder counties voted more for secession, and bluer counties voted more against secession. Counties in black have no data.

In the June 8, 1861, referendum, East Tennessee held firm against separation, while West Tennessee returned an equally heavy majority in favor. The deciding vote came in Middle Tennessee, which went from 51 percent against secession in February to 88 percent in favor in June. The voting was accused of being fraudulent; in some counties in East Tennessee Unionists threatened violence against those voting for secession, while in other places soldiers remained at the polls to hiss at those with a Unionist ballot.

Having ratified by popular vote its connection with the fledgling Confederacy, Tennessee became the eleventh and last state to formally declare its withdrawal from the Union and join the Confederacy.

== Major campaigns ==
=== 1862 ===
Control of the Cumberland and Tennessee Rivers was important in gaining control of Tennessee during the age of steamboats. Tennessee relied on northbound riverboats to receive staple commodities from the Cumberland and Tennessee valleys. The idea of using the rivers to breach the Confederate defense line in the West was well known by the end of 1861; Union gunboats had been scanning Confederate fort-building on the twin rivers for months before the campaign. Ulysses S. Grant and the United States Navy captured control of the Cumberland and Tennessee Rivers in February 1862 and held off the Confederate counterattack at Shiloh in April of the same year.

Capture of Memphis and Nashville gave the Union control of the Western and Middle sections. Control was confirmed at the battle of Murfreesboro in early January 1863. After Nashville was captured (the first Confederate state capitol to fall) Andrew Johnson, an East Tennessean from Greeneville, was appointed military governor of the state by Lincoln. During this time, the military government abolished slavery (but with questionable legality). The Confederates continued to hold East Tennessee despite the strength of Unionist sentiment there, with the exception of strongly pro-Confederate Sullivan and Rhea Counties.

=== 1863 ===
After winning a victory at Chickamauga in September 1863, the Confederates besieged Chattanooga but were finally driven off by Grant in November. Many of the Confederate defeats can be attributed to the poor leadership of General Braxton Bragg, who led the Army of Tennessee from Shiloh to the Confederate defeat in the Chattanooga campaign. Historian Thomas Connelly concludes that although Bragg was an able planner and a skillful organizer, he failed repeatedly in operations, in part because he was unable to collaborate effectively with his subordinates.

=== 1864 ===
The last major battles came when General John Bell Hood led the Confederates north in November 1864. He was checked at Franklin, and his army was virtually destroyed by George Thomas's greatly superior forces at Nashville in December.

== Battles in Tennessee ==
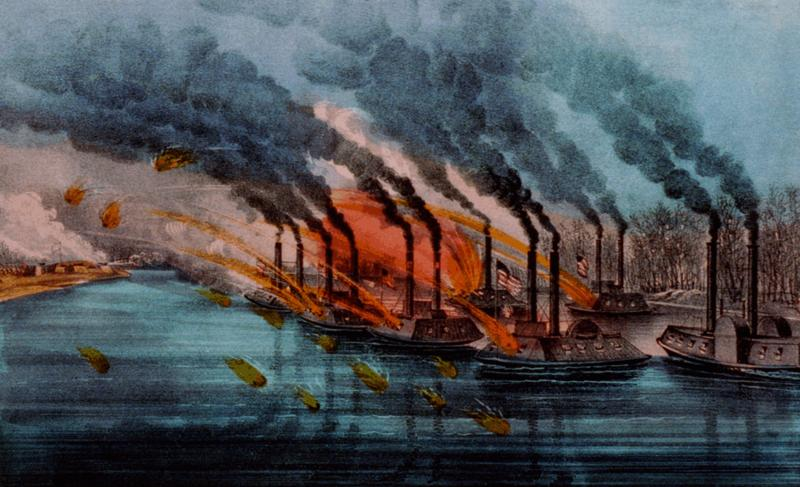
Bombardment and Capture of Fort Henry, Tenn. by Currier & Ives

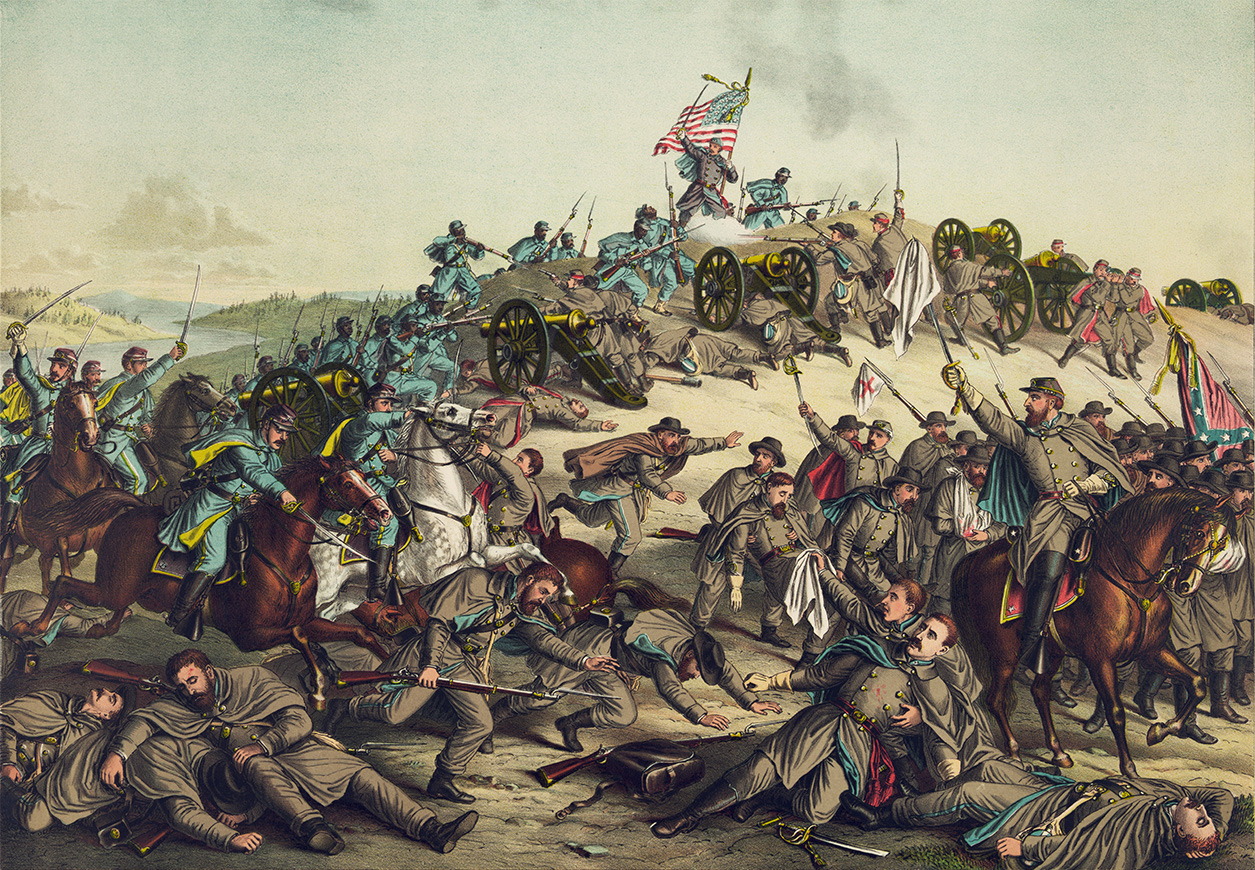
Battle of Nashville by Kurz & Allison

- Anthony's Hill
- Bean's Station
- Blountville
- Blue Springs
- Brentwood
- Britton's Lane
- Brown's Ferry
- Bull's Gap
- Campbell's Station
- First Battle of Chattanooga
- Second Battle of Chattanooga
- Third Battle of Chattanooga
- Collierville
- Columbia
- Dandridge
- Dover
- Fair Garden
- Farmington
- Fort Donelson
- Fort Henry
- Fort Pillow
- Fort Sanders (a.k.a. Fort Loudon)
- First Battle of Franklin
- Second Battle of Franklin
- Hartsville
- Hatchie's Bridge (a.k.a. Davis Bridge or Matamoro)
- Hoover's Gap
- Island Number Ten
- Jackson
- Johnsonville
- Lebanon
- Lexington
- Liberty Gap
- First Battle of Memphis
- Second Battle of Memphis
- Morristown
- Mossy Creek
- First Battle of Murfreesboro
- Third Battle of Murfreesboro
- Nashville
- Parker's Cross Roads
- Plum Point Bend
- Riggins Hill
- Battle of Rogersville (a.k.a. Big Creek)
- Shiloh
- Spring Hill
- Stones River (a.k.a. Second Battle of Murfreesboro)
- Thompson's Station
- Vaught's Hill (a.k.a. Milton)
- Wauhatchie (a.k.a. Brown's Berry)

== Notable Confederate leaders from Tennessee ==
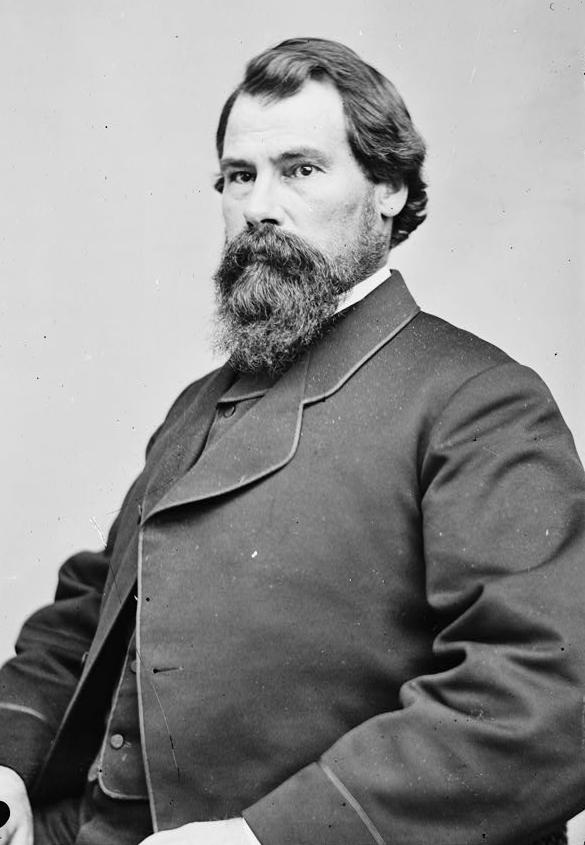
C.S. Postmaster Gen.
John Henninger Reagan

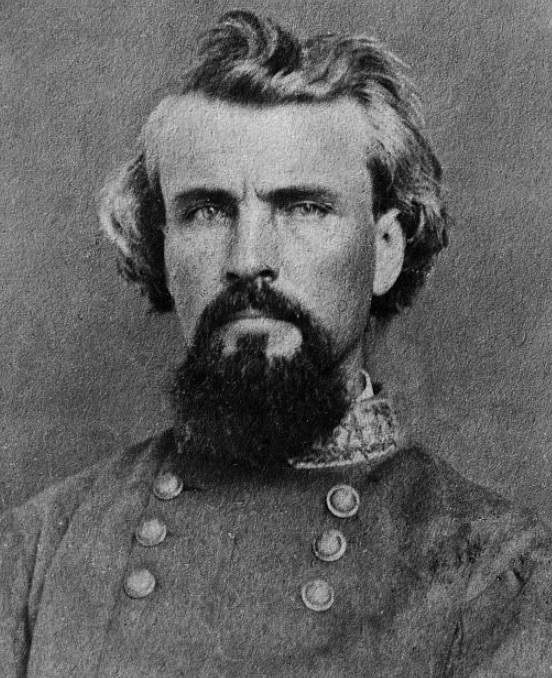
Lt. Gen.
Nathan Bedford Forrest

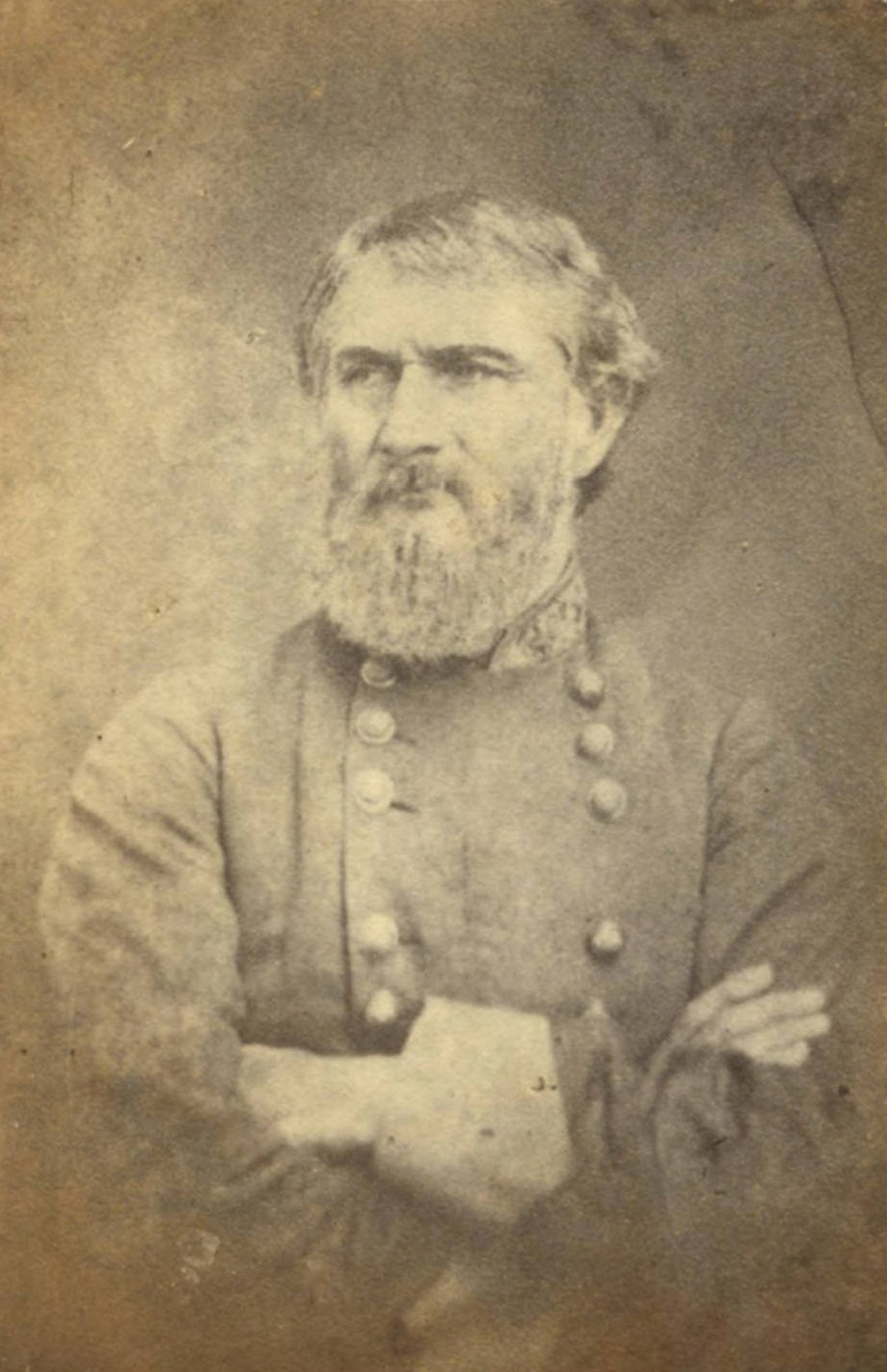
Lt. Gen.
Leonidas Polk

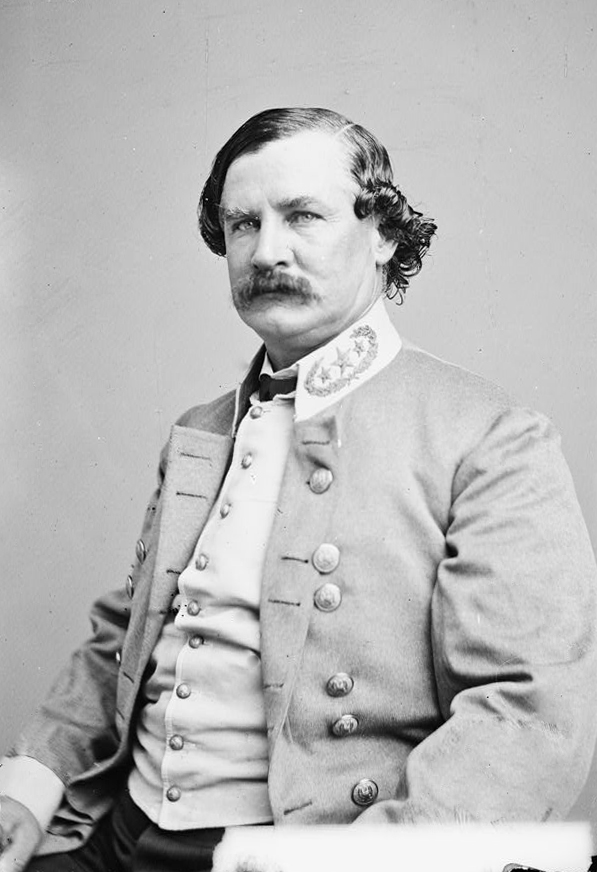
Lt. Gen.
Benjamin F. Cheatham

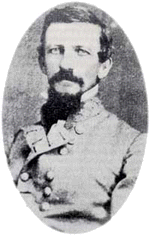
Lt. Gen.
Alexander P. Stewart

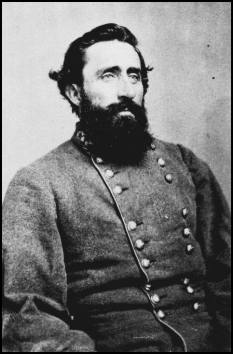
Maj. Gen.
William B. Bate

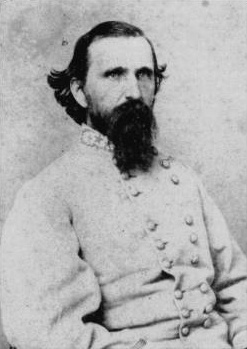
Maj. Gen.
John C. Brown

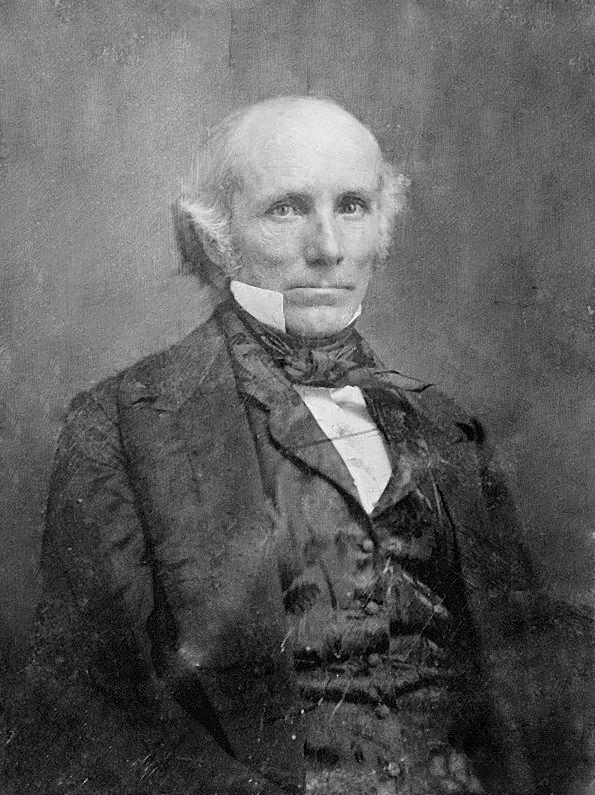
Sen.
Henry S. Foote

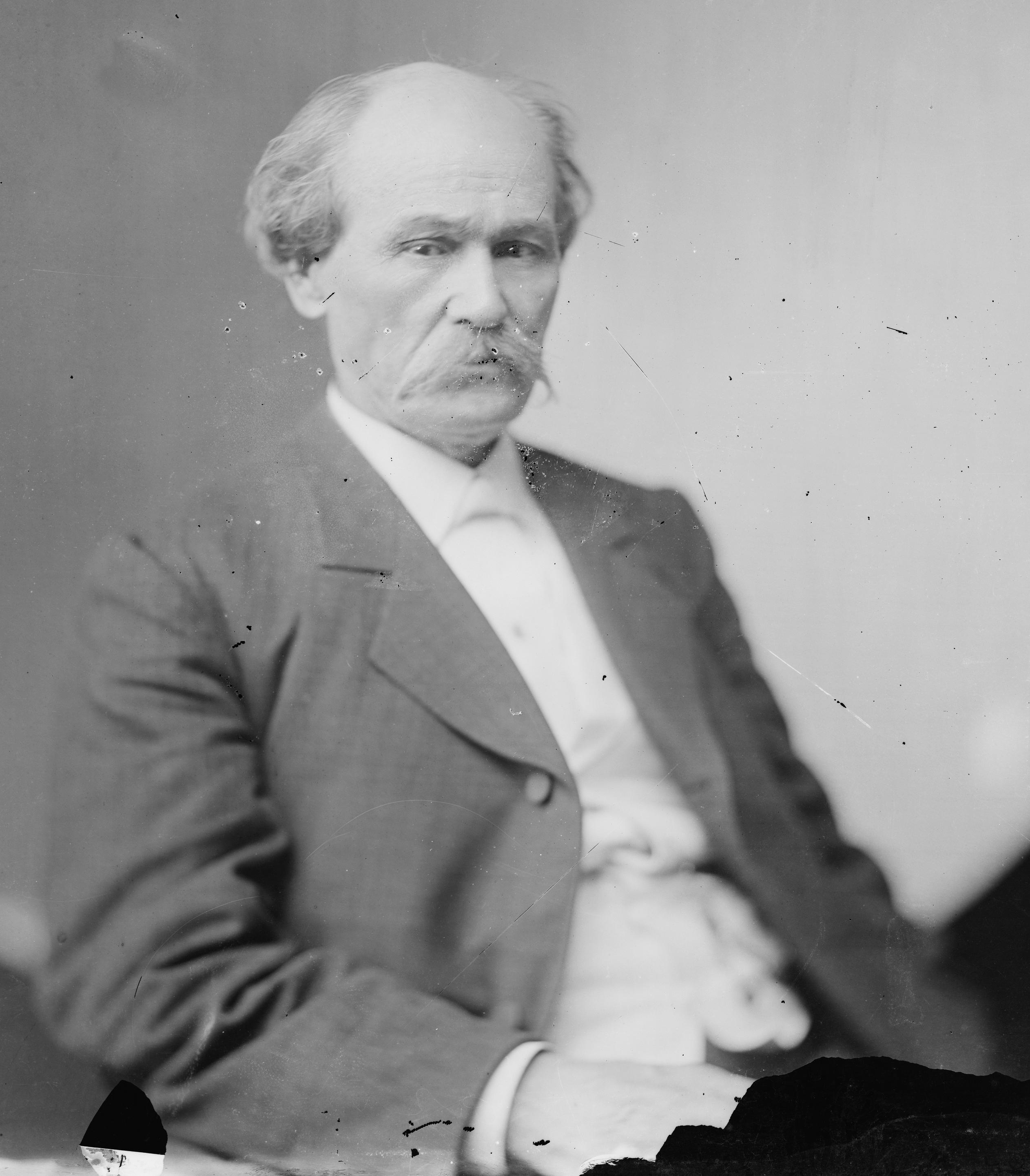
Gov.
Isham G. Harris

TN House of Rep. & Brig. Gen.
Robert H. Hatton

Brigadier General
John C. Moore

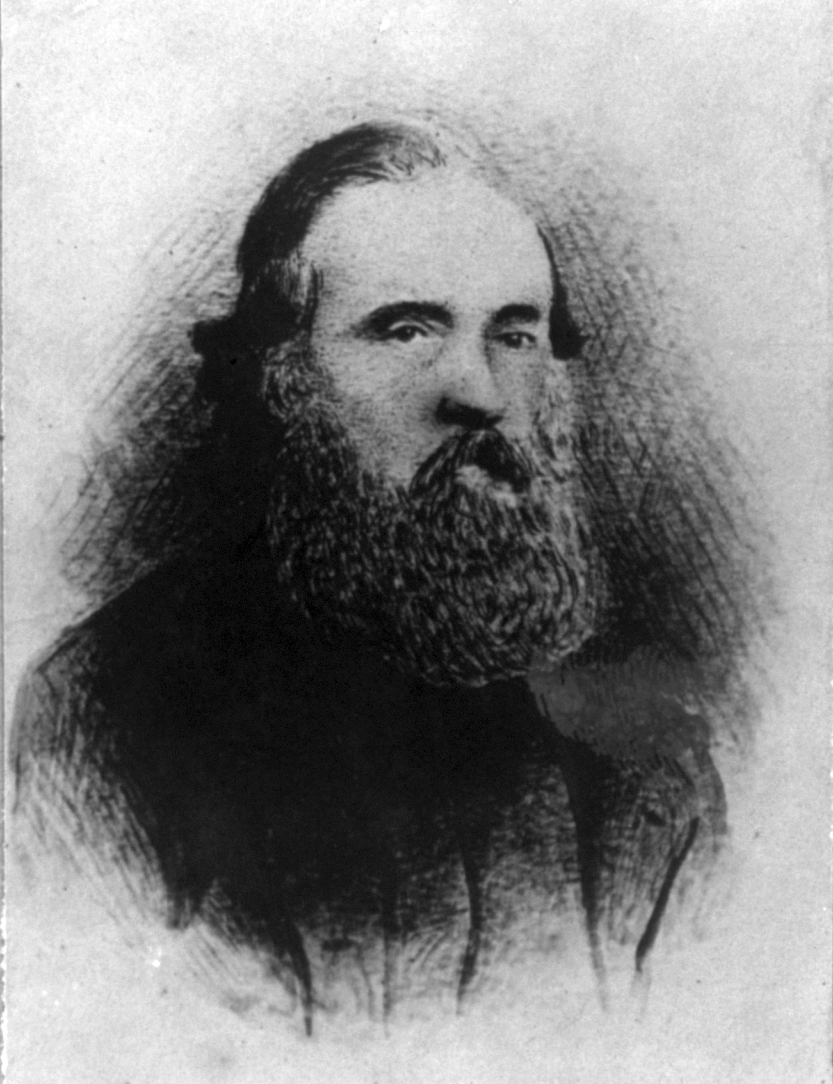
Brigadier General
William H. Carroll

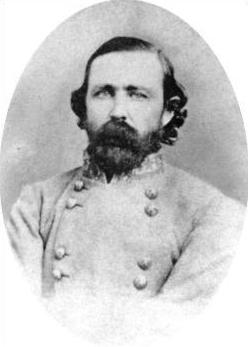
Brigadier General
George Maney

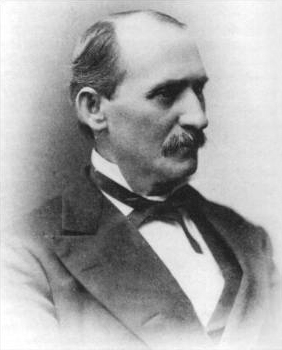
Brigadier General
Charles M. Shelley

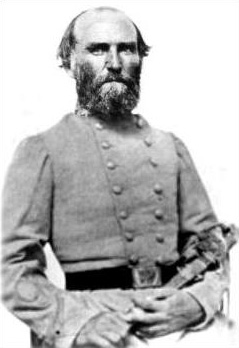
Brigadier General
William Read Scurry

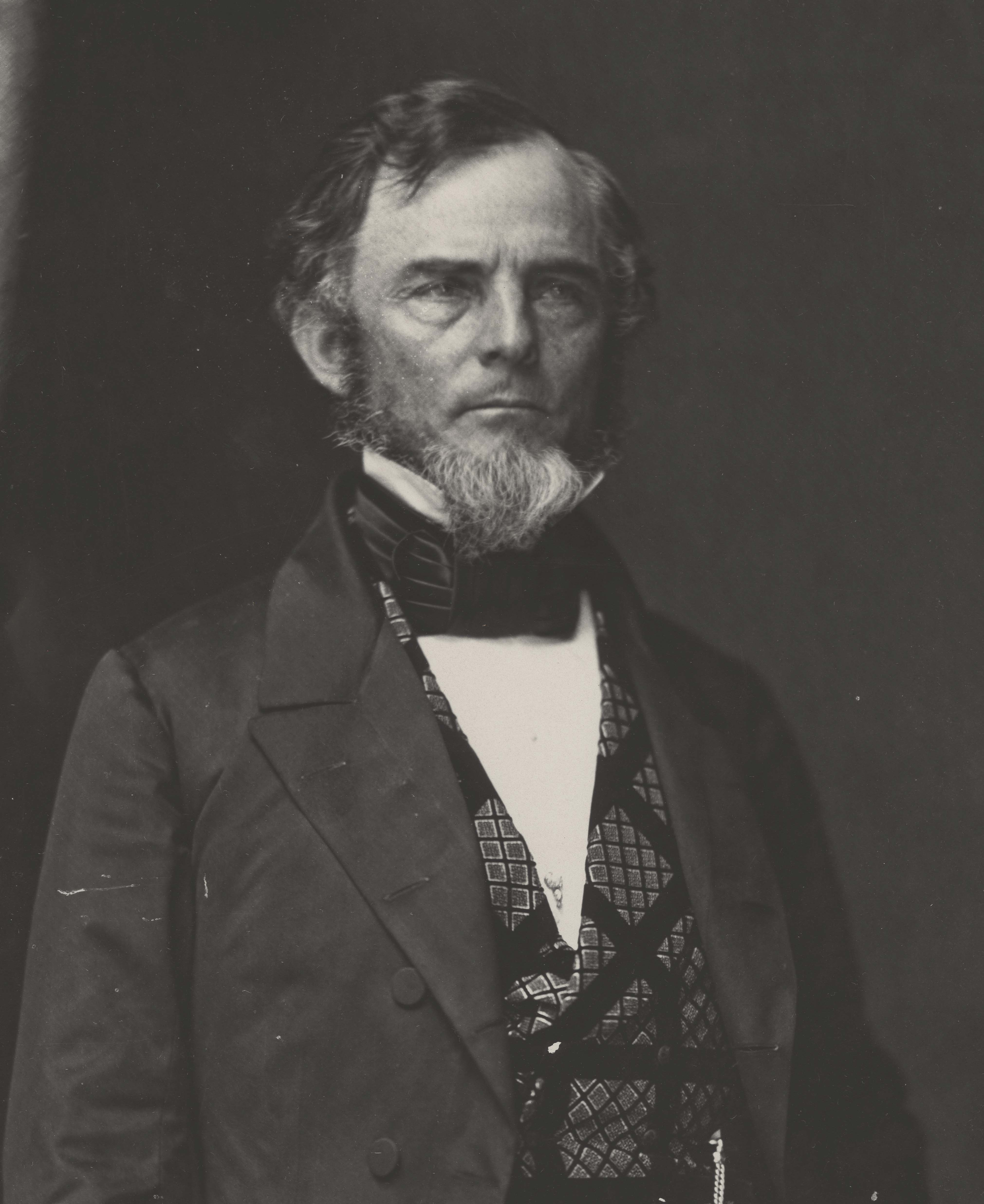
Brigadier General
Gideon J. Pillow

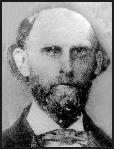
Brigadier General
Robert V. Richardson

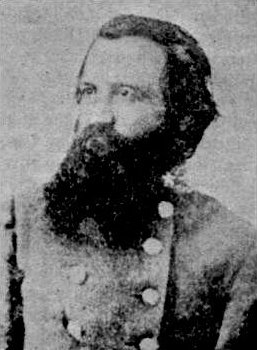
Brigadier General
James A. Smith

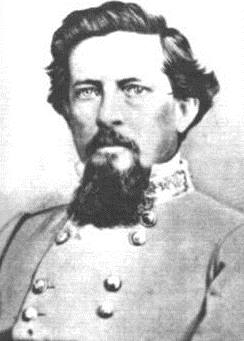
Brigadier General
Preston Smith

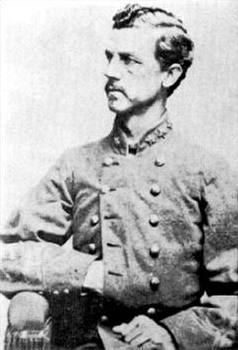
Brigadier General
Thomas B. Smith

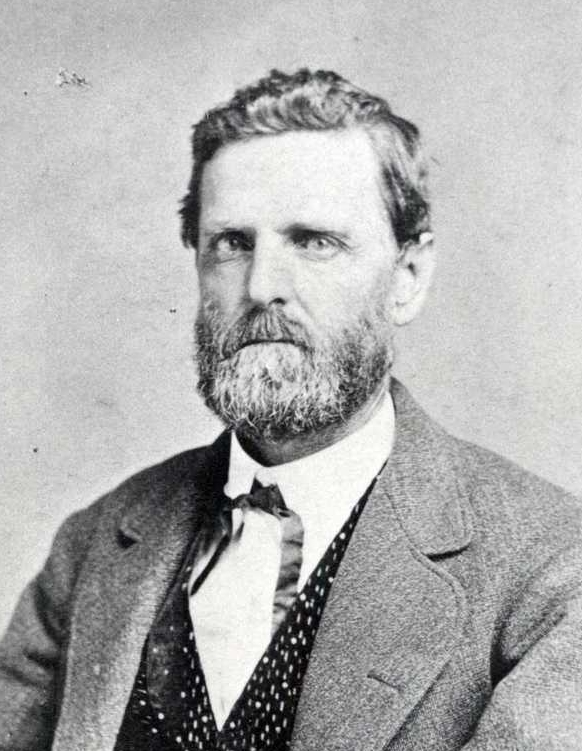
Brigadier General
John C. Vaughn

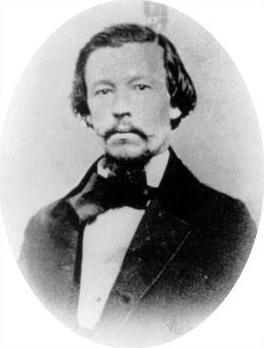
Brigadier General
Lucius M. Walker

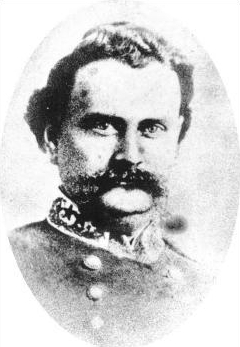
Brigadier General
Marcus J. Wright

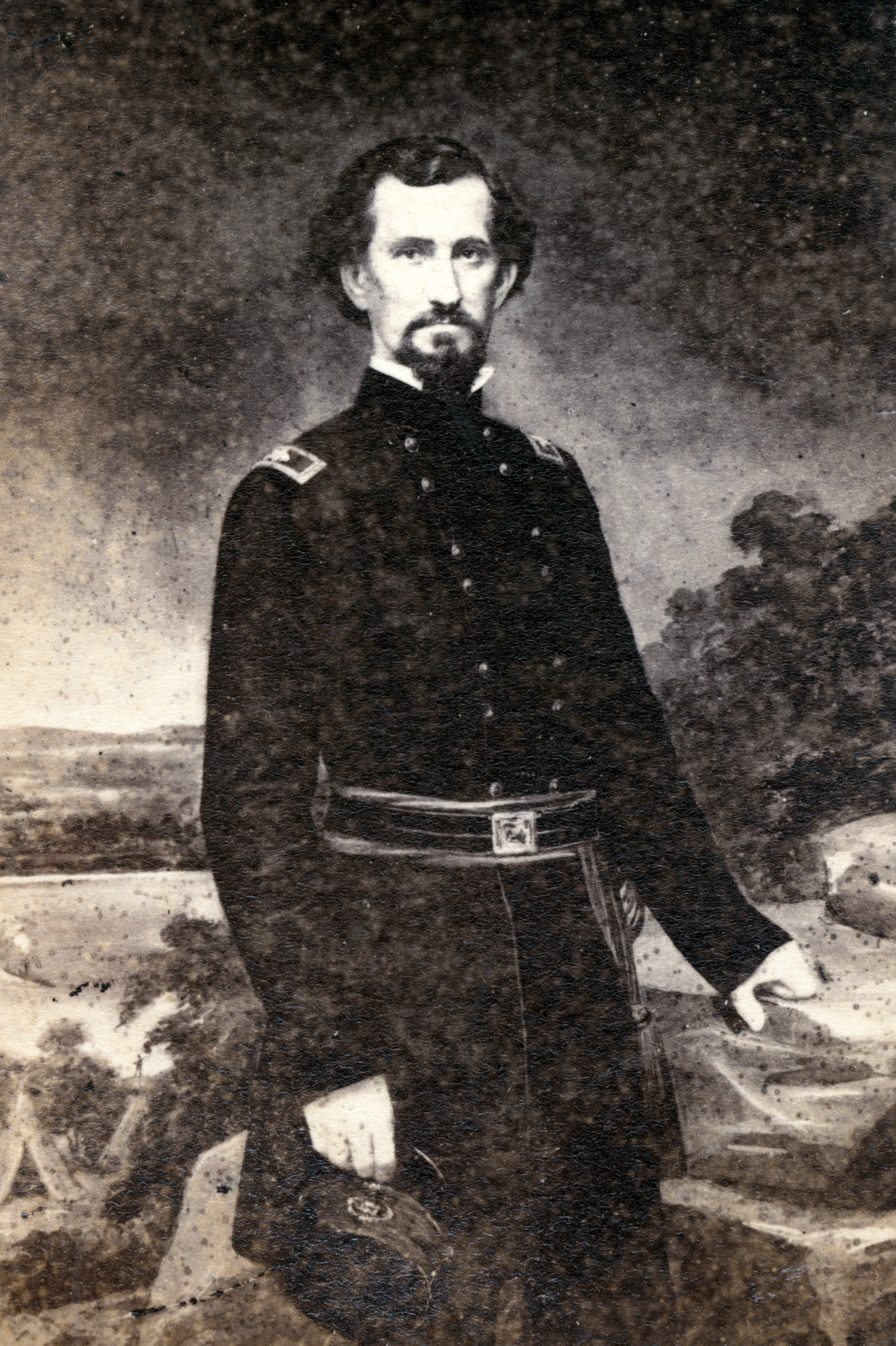
Brigadier General
Felix Zollicoffer

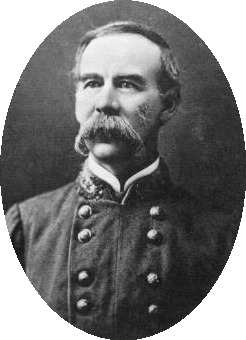
Brigadier General
Joseph B. Palmer

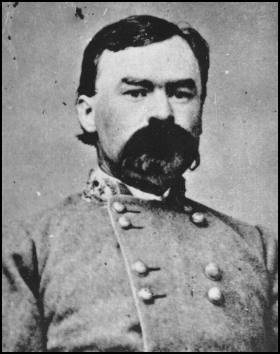
Brigadier General
William H. Jackson

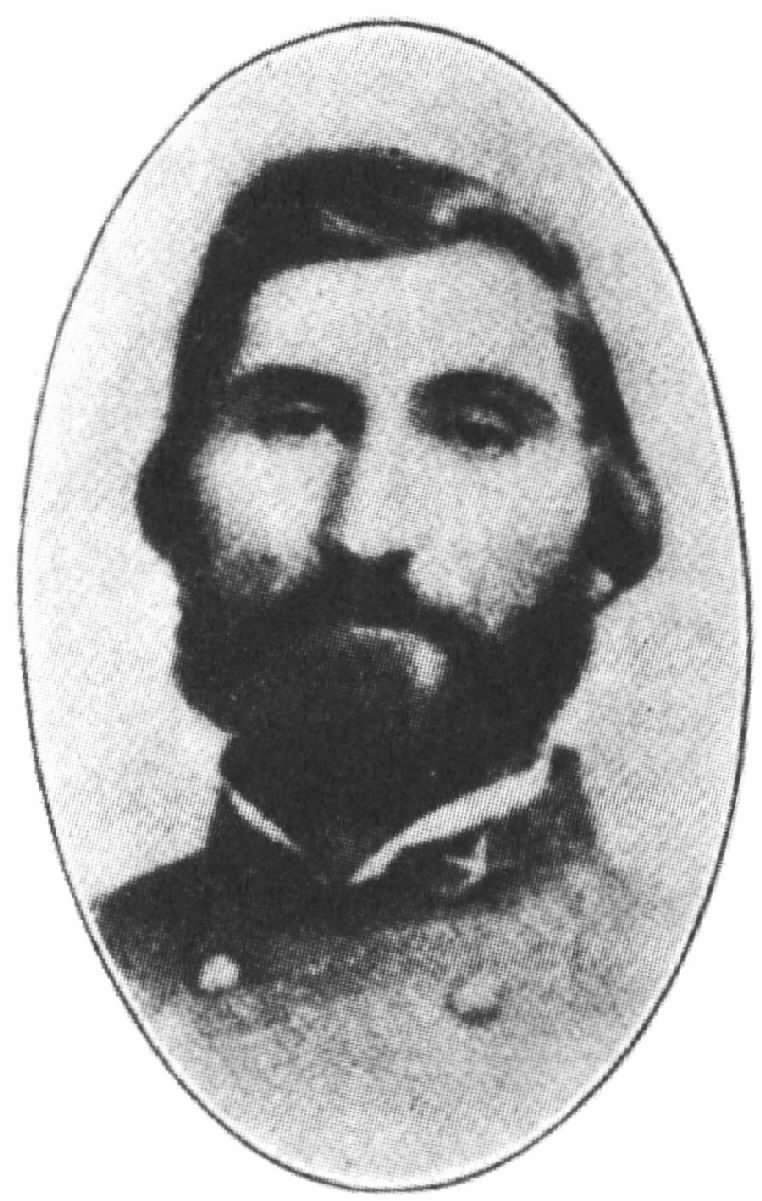
Brigadier General
Samuel Benton

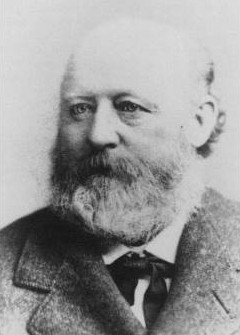
Brigadier General
Henry B. Davidson

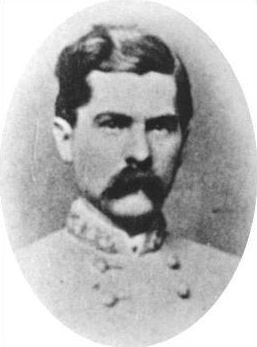
Brigadier General
William P. Hardeman

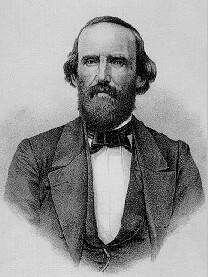
Brigadier General
Benjamin McCulloch

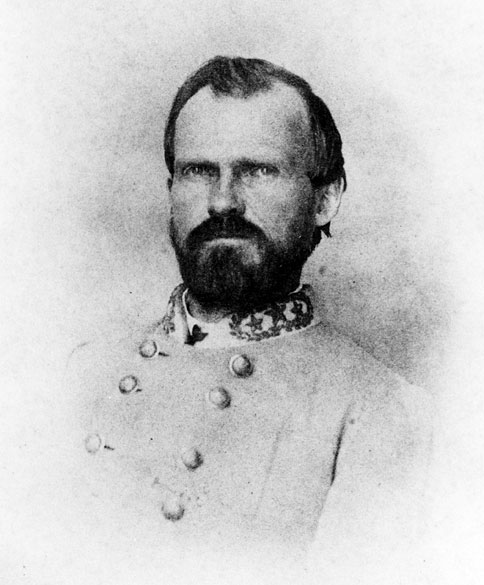
Brigadier General
James C. Tappan

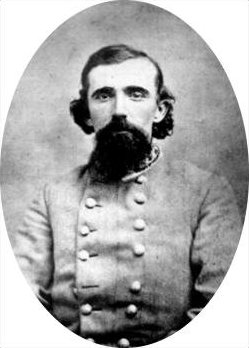
Brigadier General
Lucius E. Polk

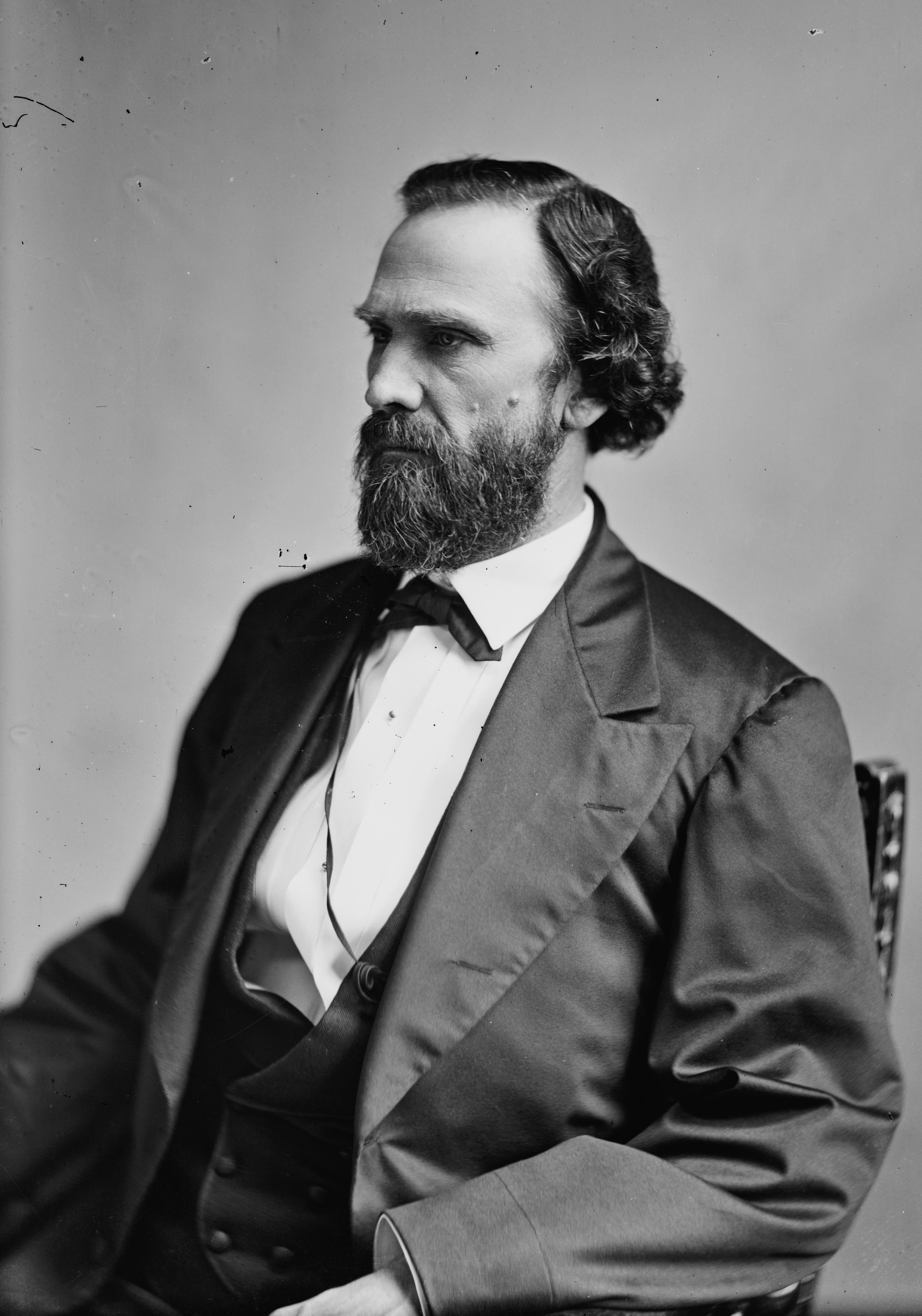
Lt. Colonel
John DeWitt Clinton Atkins

== Notable Union leaders from Tennessee ==
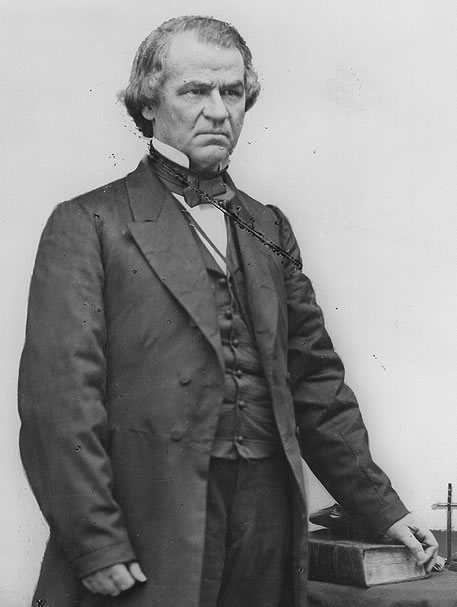
President
Andrew Johnson

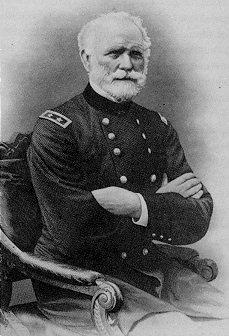
Bvt. Maj. Gen.
William S. Harney

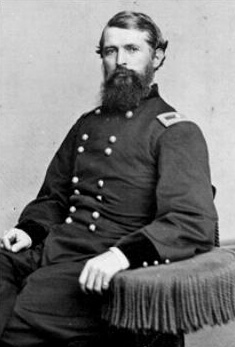
Rear Adm. & Brig. Gen.
Samuel P. Carter

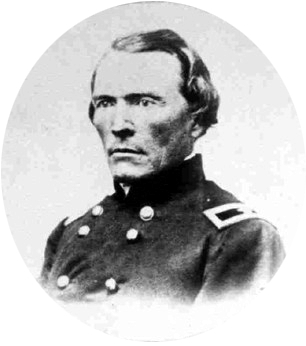
Brigadier General
James G. Spears

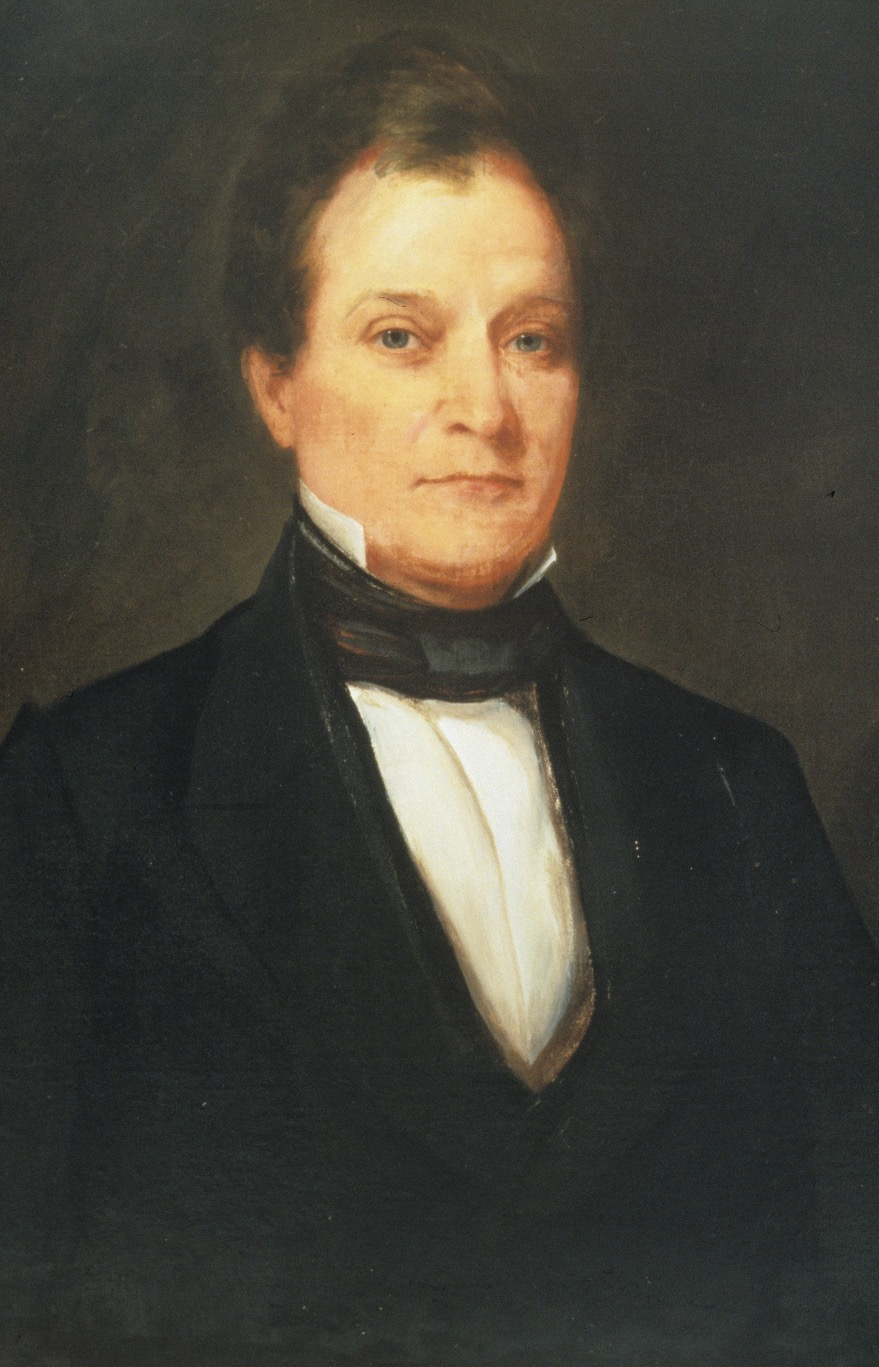
Brigadier General
William B. Campbell

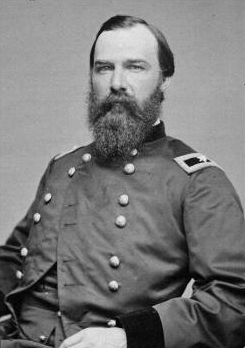
Brigadier General
Alvan C. Gillem

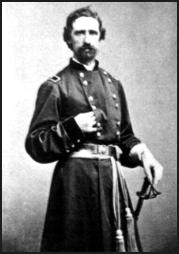
Bvt. Brig. Gen.
William Jay Smith

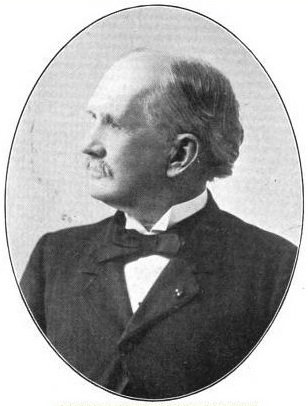
Colonel
Felix A. Reeve

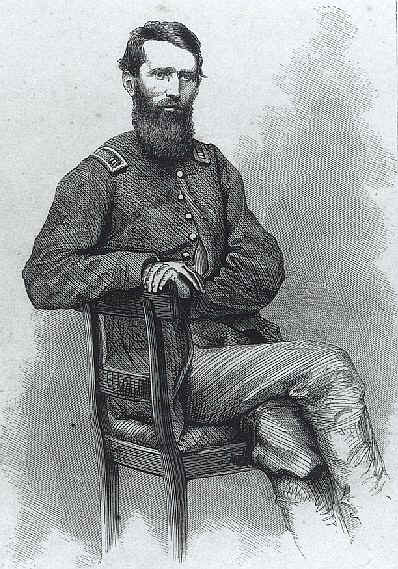
Capt. & Guerrilla
Daniel Ellis

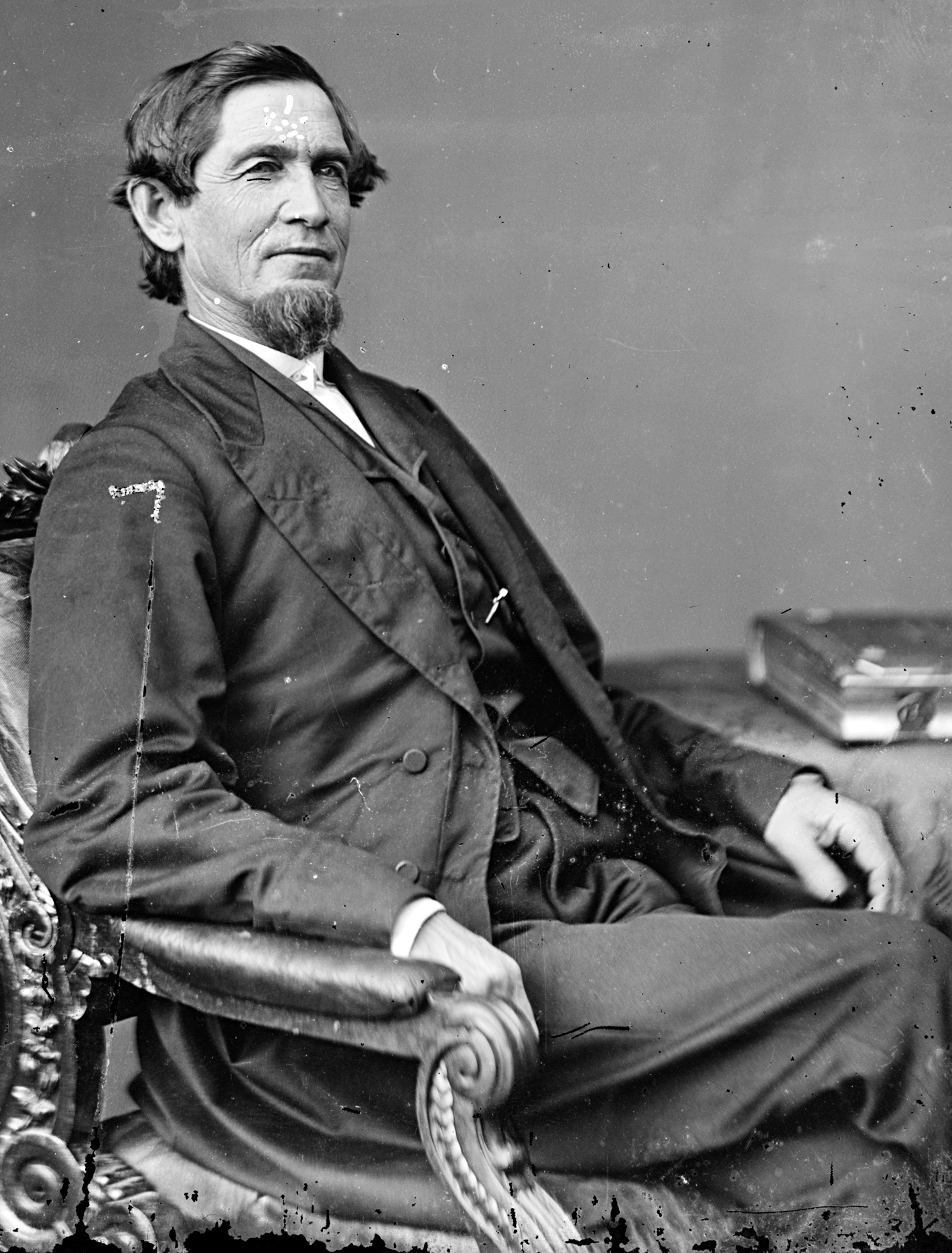
U.S. House of Rep. & Lt. Col.
Isaac R. Hawkins

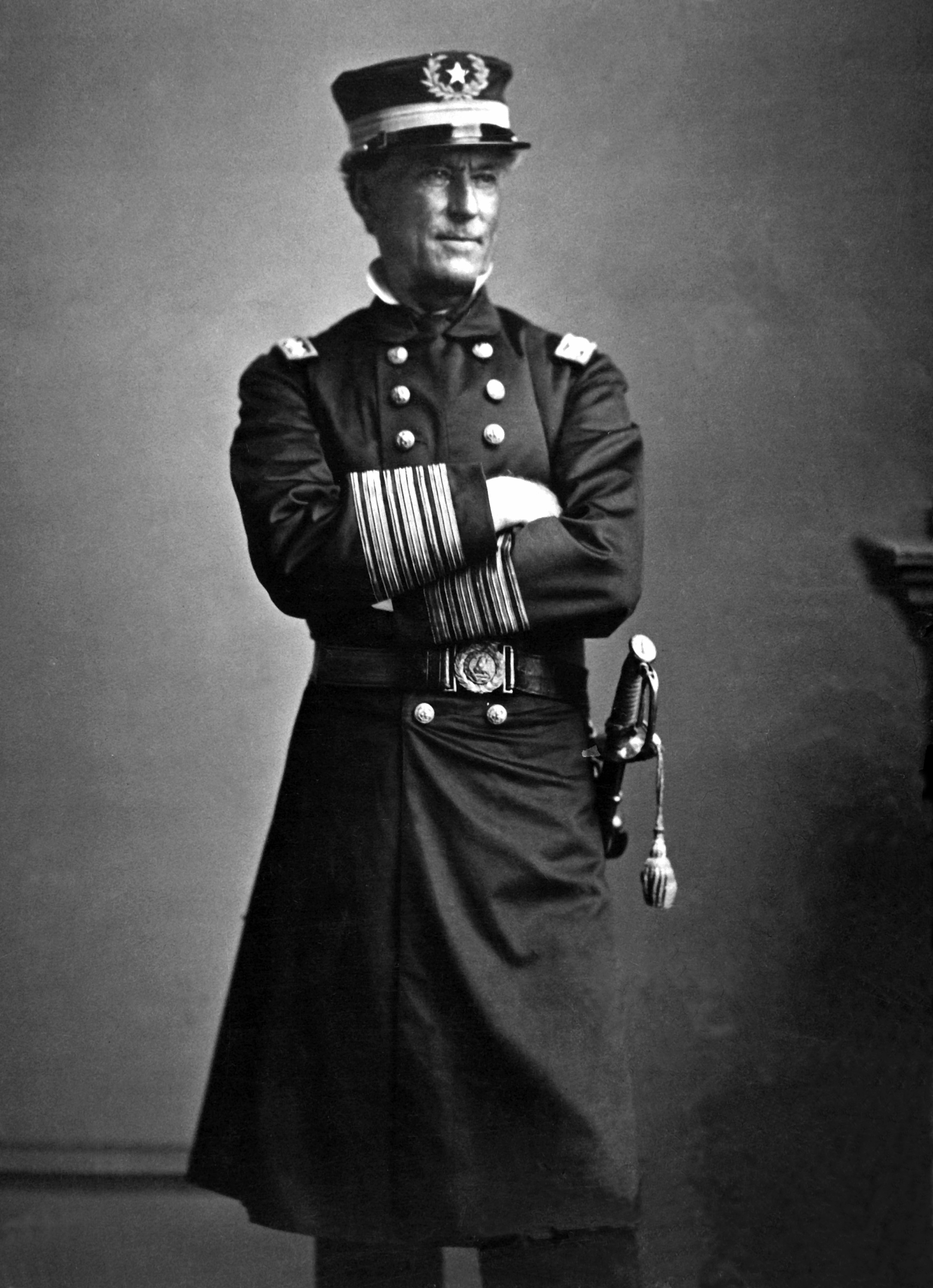
Rear Admiral
David G. Farragut

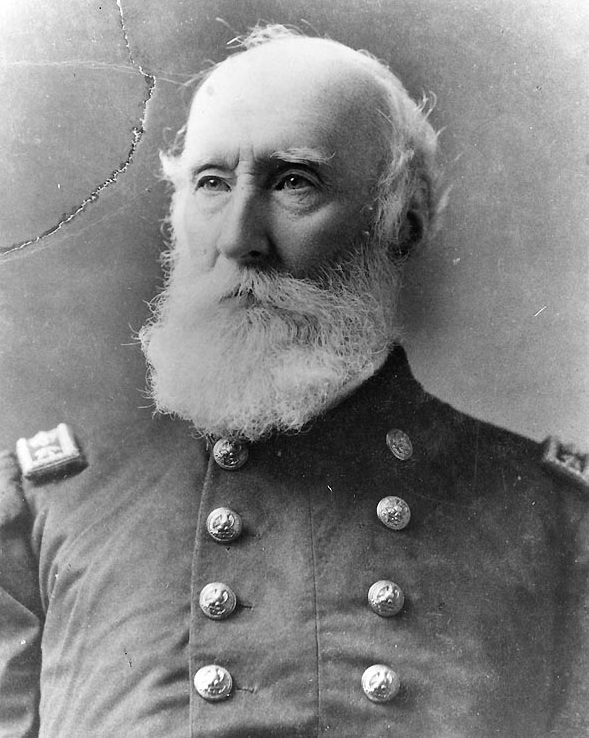
Rear Admiral
George Balch

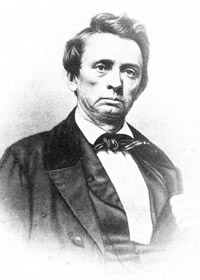
War Governor
William G. Brownlow

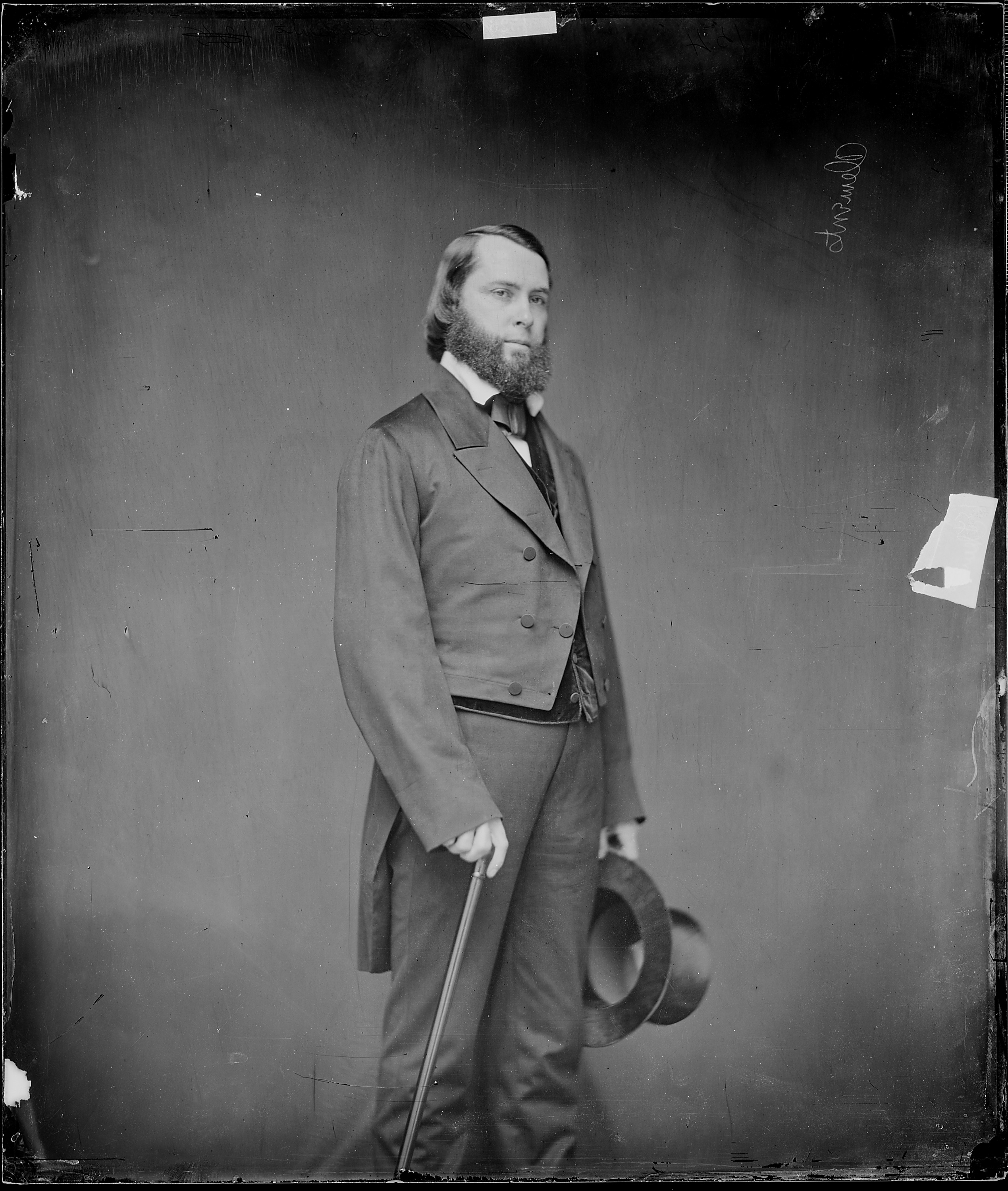
Surgeon & U.S. House of Rep.
Andrew Jackson Clements

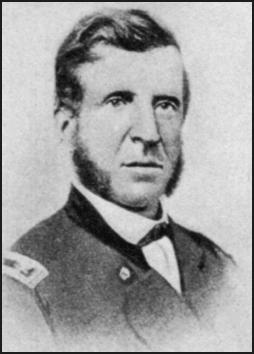
Brig. Gen. & Bvt. Maj. Gen.
Joseph Alexander Cooper

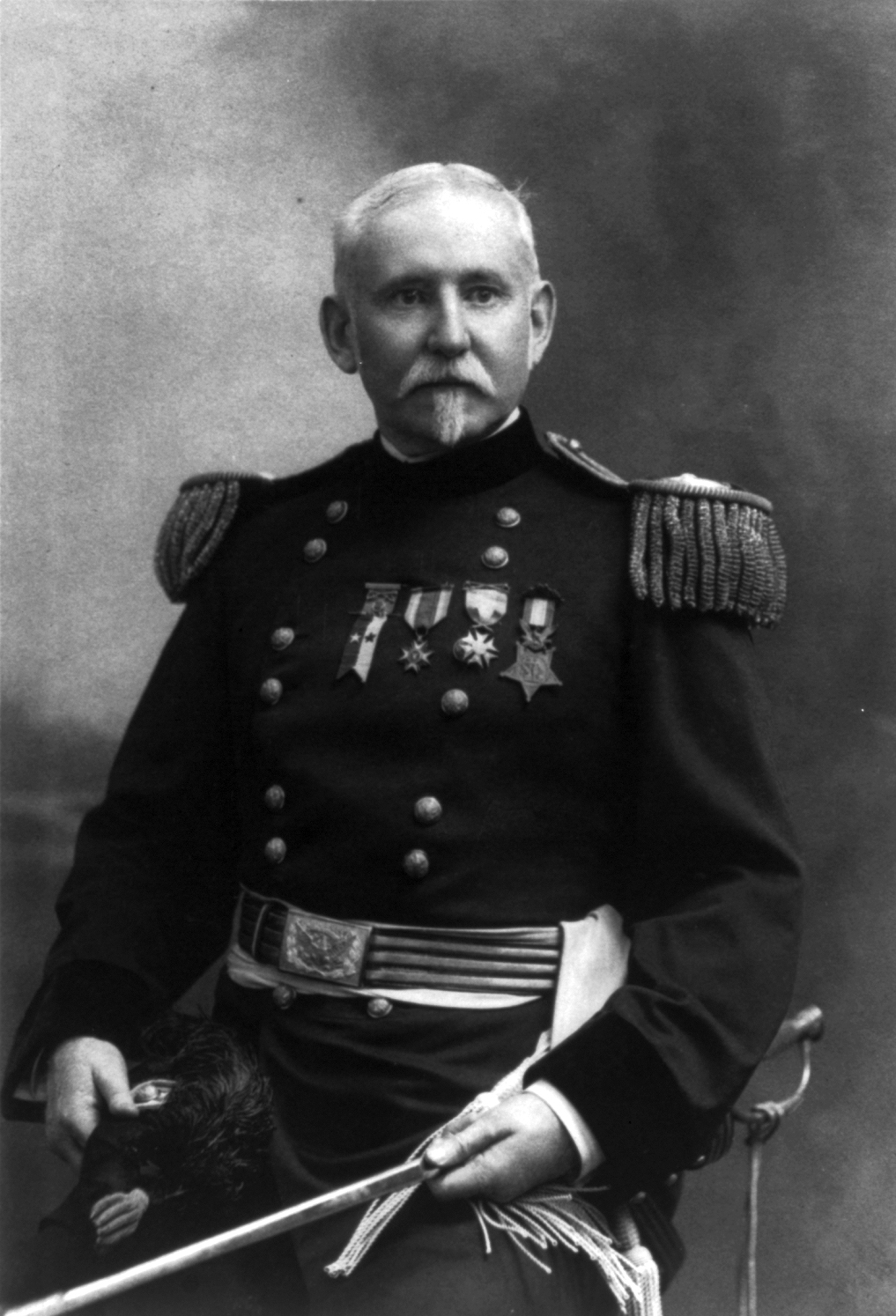
Lieutenant
George Lewis Gillespie Jr.

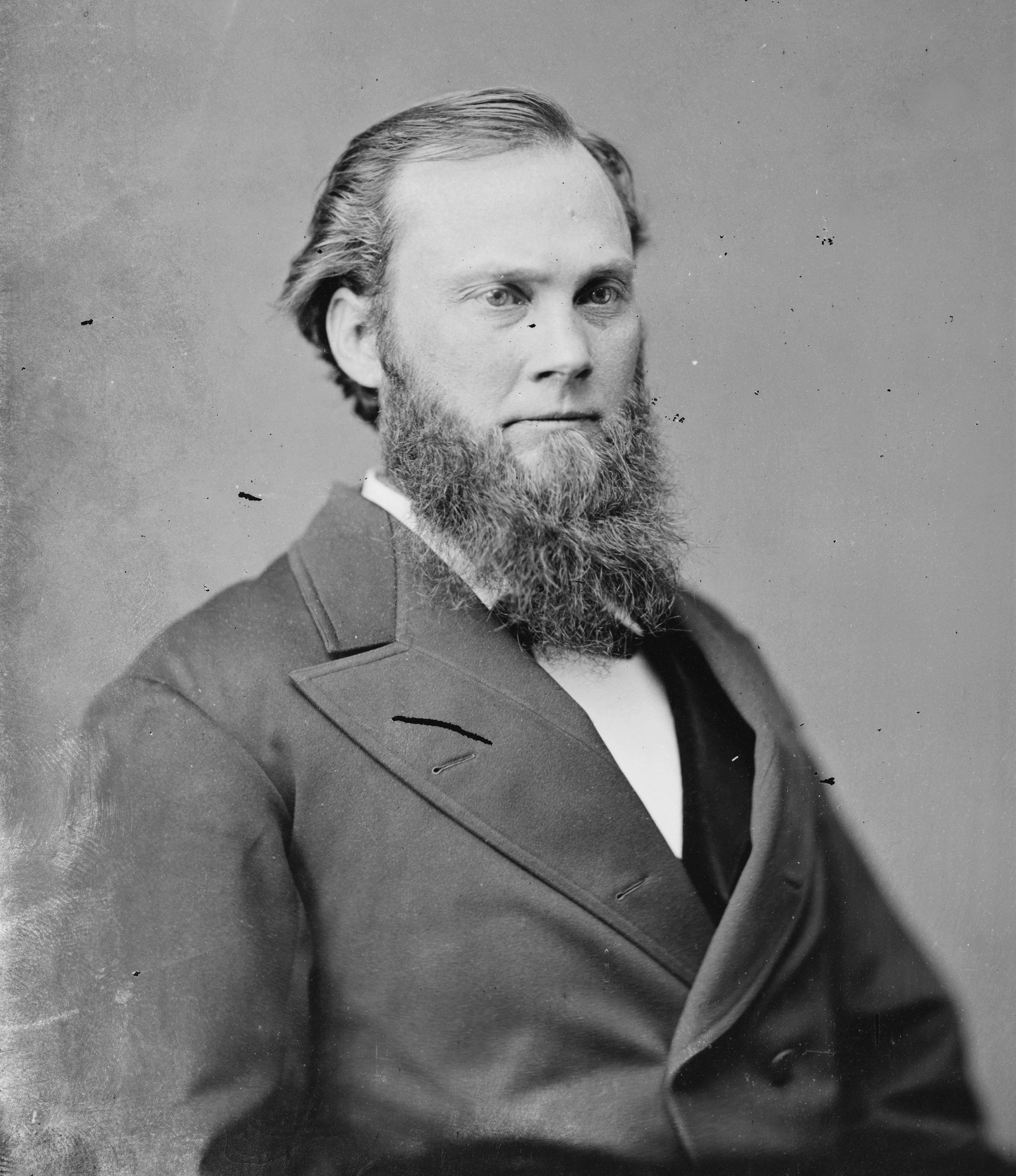
Lt. Col.
Jacob Montgomery Thornburgh

== Government and politics ==
Fear of subversion was widespread throughout the state. In West and Middle Tennessee it was fear of pro-Union activism, which was countered proactively by numerous local Committees of Safety and Vigilance from 1860 to 1862. They emerged as early as the 1860 Presidential election, and when the war began activists developed an aggressive program to detect and suppress Unionists. The committees set up a spy system, intercepted mail, inspected luggage, forced the enlistment of men into the Confederate Army, confiscated private property, and whenever it seemed necessary lynched enemies of the Confederacy. The committees were disbanded by the Union Army when it took control in 1862.

=== Unionism and East Tennessee ===
Area of Tennessee	Slave percentage of total population
East Tennessee	9%
Middle Tennessee	29%
West Tennessee	34%

East Tennessee was a stronghold of Unionism; most slaves were house servants—luxuries—rather than the base of plantation operations. East Tennesseans feared that they would become second-class citizens in a country with a slave-owning aristocracy. The dominant mood strongly opposed secession. Tennesseans representing twenty-six East Tennessee counties met twice in Greeneville and Knoxville and agreed to secede from Tennessee (see East Tennessee Convention of 1861.) They petitioned the state legislature in Nashville, which denied their request to secede and sent Confederate troops under Felix Zollicoffer to occupy East Tennessee and prevent secession. The region thus came under Confederate control from 1861 to 1863. Nevertheless, East Tennessee supplied significant numbers of troops to the Federal army. (See also Nickajack.) Many East Tennesseans engaged in guerrilla warfare against state authorities by burning bridges, cutting telegraph wires, and spying for the North. East Tennessee became an early base for the Republican Party in the South. Strong support for the Union challenged the Confederate commanders who controlled East Tennessee for most of the war. Generals Felix K. Zollicoffer, Edmund Kirby Smith, and Sam Jones oscillated between harsh measures and conciliatory gestures to gain support but had little success whether they arrested hundreds of Unionist leaders or allowed men to escape the Confederate draft. Union forces finally captured the region in 1863. General William Sherman's famous March to the Sea saw him personally escorted by the 1st Alabama Cavalry Regiment, which consisted entirely of Unionist southerners. Despite its name, the regiment consisted largely of men from Tennessee.

== Economy ==
Refugees poured into Nashville during the war, because jobs were plentiful in the depots, warehouses, and hospitals serving the war effort, and furthermore, the city was a much safer place than the countryside. Unionists and Confederate sympathizers both flooded in, as did free blacks and escaped slaves, and businessmen from the North. There was little heavy industry in the South but the Western Iron District in Middle Tennessee was the largest iron producer in the Confederacy in 1861. One of the largest operations was the Cumberland Iron Works, which the Confederate War Department tried and failed to protect. Memphis and Nashville, with very large transient populations, had flourishing red light districts. Union wartime regulations forced prostitutes to purchase licenses and pass medical exams, primarily to protect soldiers from venereal disease. Their trade was deregulated once military control ended.

== Aftermath ==
In January 1865, a convention tasked with choosing delegates for a proposed constitutional convention decided it had the power to propose amendments to the Tennessee state constitution and present them for ratification in an election. Dominated by pro-Union forces allied with Military Governor Andrew Johnson, the convention proposed two constitutional amendments, one abolishing slavery and involuntary servitude unless imposed as punishment for a crime, and one repudiating the state's allegiance with the Confederate States of America. Both amendments were passed by voters on February 22, 1865, and subsequently went into effect later in April to May of the same year as the war was coming to a close. (A new proposed constitutional amendment that will go before the voters in 2022 will abolish slavery as a punishment for crime and remove it from the state constitution.)

After the war, the state legislature ratified the Fourteenth Amendment to the United States Constitution on July 18, 1866, and was the first state readmitted to the Union on July 24, 1866. Because it ratified the Fourteenth Amendment, Tennessee was the only state that seceded from the Union that did not have a military governor during Reconstruction, nor was it part of any of the Reconstruction military districts, even though this did not placate those unhappy with the Confederate defeat. However, federal troops would remain in Tennessee following the state's readmission to protect federal property, enforce laws, and keep the peace. Tennessee would be put under martial law during Reconstruction in 1869 to 1870 by then Governor Parson Brownlow through the Enforcement Acts mostly due to the growing threat of the Ku Klux Klan throughout the state. Many white Tennesseans resisted efforts to expand suffrage and other civil rights to the freedmen.

For generations, white Tennesseans had been raised to believe that slavery was justified. Some could not accept that their former slaves were now equal under the law. When the state Supreme Court upheld the constitutionality of African American suffrage in 1867, the reaction became stronger. The Nashville Republican Banner on January 4, 1868, published an editorial calling for a revolutionary movement of white Southerners to unseat the one-party state rule imposed by the Republican Party and restore the legal inferiority of the region's black population.

"In this State, reconstruction has perfected itself and done its worst. It has organized a government which is as complete a closed corporation as may be found; it has placed the black man over the white as the agent and prime-move of domination; it has constructed a system of machinery by which all free guarantees, privileges and opportunities are removed from the people.... The impossibility of casting a free vote in Tennessee short of a revolutionary movement ... is an undoubted fact."

The Banner urged its readers to ignore the presidential election and direct their energy into building "a local movement here at home" to end Republican rule.

According to the 1860 census, African Americans made up only 25% of Tennessee's population, which meant they could not dominate politics. Only a few African Americans served in the Tennessee legislature during Reconstruction, and not many more as state and city officers. However, the Nashville Banner may have been reacting to increased participation by African Americans on that city's council, where they held about one-third of the seats. Tennessee has strong Confederate memories, which focused on the Lost Cause theme of heroic defense of traditional liberties.

== See also ==
- List of Tennessee Confederate Civil War units
- List of Tennessee Union Civil War units
- Nashville in the Civil War
- Chattanooga in the American Civil War
- History of slavery in Tennessee
- 1861 Tennessee gubernatorial election

Preceded by North Carolina	List of C.S. states by date of admission to the Confederacy; Admitted on July 2, 1861 (11th)	Succeeded by Missouri
