= 1861 Tennessee gubernatorial election =

1861 Tennessee gubernatorial election (Confederate)
- August 1, 1861
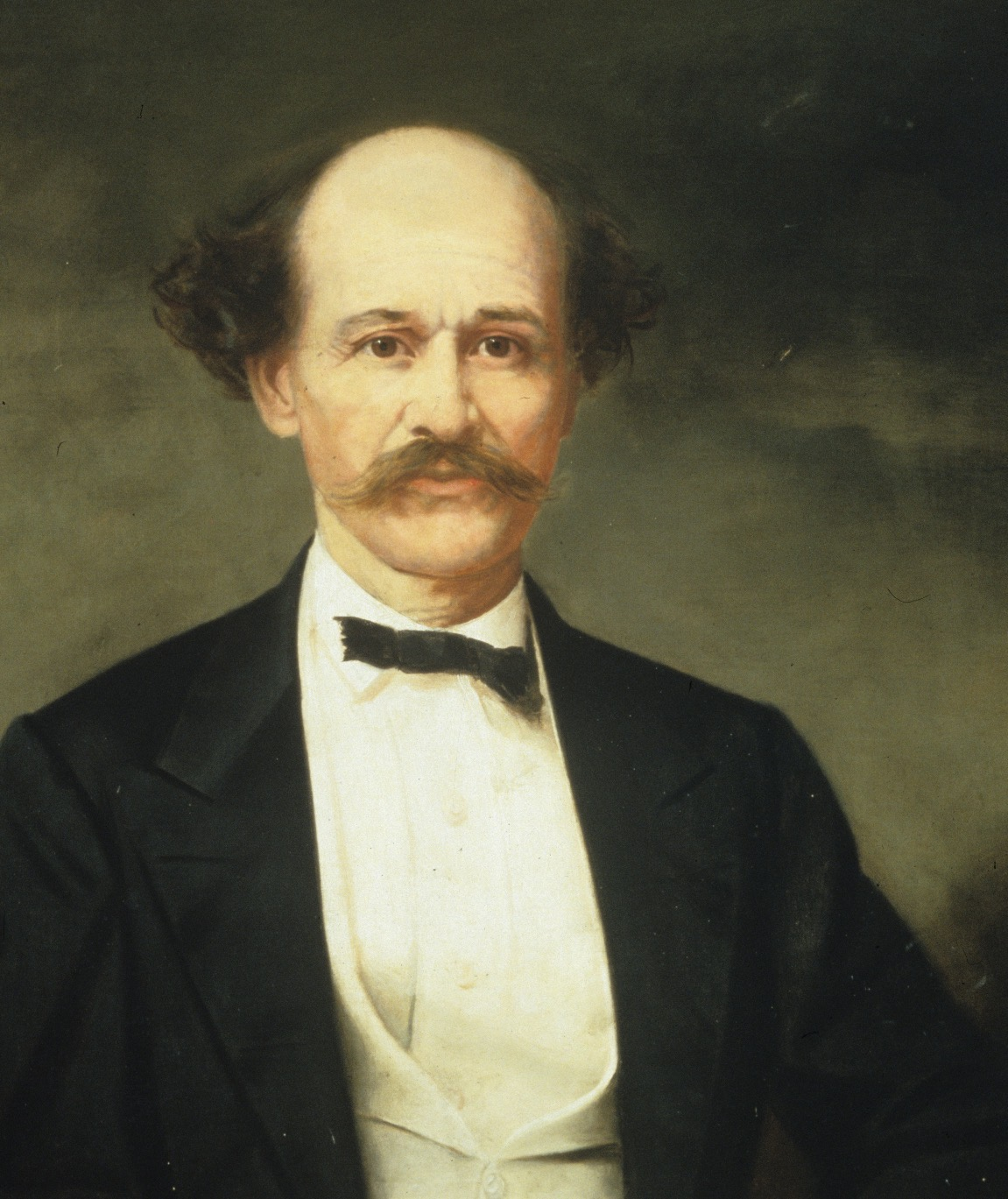

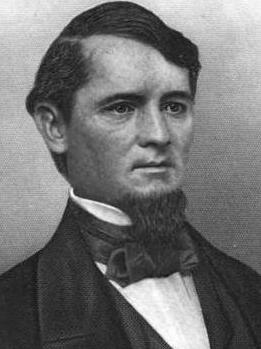
Nominee	Isham G. Harris	William Hawkins Polk
Party	Democratic	Independent Democrat
Alliance		Southern Unionist
Popular vote	74,973 (Note: The votes of several counties were not reported. Including the known return of Scott County, the vote total would be 75,001 (63.18%) for Harris and 43,700 (36.82%) for Polk.)	43,342
Percentage	63.37%	36.63%
- County results Harris: 50–60% 60–70% 70–80% 80–90% >90% Polk: 50–60% 60–70% 70–80% 80–90% >90% No data/No votes
Governor before election
Isham G. Harris
Democratic
Elected Governor
Isham G. Harris
Democratic

The 1861 Tennessee gubernatorial (Confederate) election was held on August 1, 1861, to elect the governor of Tennessee. Incumbent Democratic governor Isham G. Harris won re-election, defeating Independent Democrat William Hawkins Polk, brother of former president James K. Polk, with 63.37% of the vote.

This election took place about two months after Tennessee seceded from the Union during the outbreak of the Civil War. Governor Isham G. Harris was a secessionist, while during the campaign, Polk announced that he was in favor of Tennessee joining the Confederacy, However closer to the election he ran on a pro-Union platform. William G. Brownlow, a leader of the state's Unionists, reluctantly endorsed Polk as a lesser of two evils.

By the time the campaign had gotten underway, East Tennessee was threatening to withdraw from the state and join the Union, and Polk campaigned as the candidate best suited to reconcile East Tennessee with the rest of the state. He attacked Governor Harris for ordering troops into East Tennessee, arguing the move only served to inflame already-heightened tensions in the region.

In the months following the election, Polk traveled to Washington to champion causes for the state's Unionists, including advocating the confiscation of the property of Confederates. In June 1862, after the Union Army had recaptured Nashville, he spoke at a Unionist convention in the city. In September 1862, Polk joined the staff of Union Army general Thomas L. Crittenden.

== Background ==
Governor Harris endorsed John C. Breckinridge for president in 1860, and warned that the state must consider secession if the "reckless fanatics of the north" should gain control of the federal government. Following Lincoln's election in November, Harris convened a special session of the legislature on January 7, 1861, which ordered a statewide referendum on whether or not Tennessee should consider secession. Pro-Union newspapers assailed Harris's actions as treasonous. The Huntingdon Carroll Patriot wrote that Harris was more deserving of the gallows than Benedict Arnold. William "Parson" Brownlow, editor of the Knoxville Whig, particularly despised Harris, calling him "Eye Sham" and "King Harris," and slammed his actions as autocratic. When the referendum was held in February, Tennesseans rejected secession by a vote of 68,000 to 59,000.

Following the Battle of Fort Sumter in April 1861, President Lincoln ordered Harris to furnish 50,000 soldiers for the suppression of the rebellion. Reading his response to Lincoln before a raucous crowd in Nashville on April 17, Harris said, "Not a single man will be furnished from Tennessee," and stated he would rather cut off his right arm than sign the order. On April 25, Harris addressed a special session of the state legislature, stating that the Union had been destroyed by the "bloody and tyrannical policies of the Presidential usurper," and called for an end to the state's ties to the United States. Shortly afterward, the legislature authorized Harris to enter into a compact with the new Confederate States of America.

=== Tennessee secedes ===
Results of the June 8, 1861, referendum by county: Opposed: 50–60%; 60–70%; 70–80%; 80–90%; 90–97%; Support: 50–60%; 60–70%; 70–80%; 80–90%; 90–100%; No data: No data

On June 8, 1861, Tennesseans voted in favor of the Ordinance of Secession, 68.95% to 31.05% (104,913 to 47,238 votes). East Tennessee held firm against separation, while West Tennessee returned an equally heavy majority in favor. The deciding vote came in Middle Tennessee, which went from 51 percent against secession in February to 88 percent in favor in June. The voting was accused of being fraudulent; in some counties in East Tennessee Unionists threatened violence against those voting for secession, while in other places soldiers remained at the polls to hiss at those with a Unionist ballot.

Having ratified by popular vote its connection with the fledgling Confederacy, Tennessee became the last state to declare formally its withdrawal from the Union.

== General election ==
1861 Tennessee gubernatorial election (Confederate)
Party	Candidate	Votes	%	±%
Democratic	Isham G. Harris (incumbent)	74,973	63.37	
Independent Democrat	William Hawkins Polk	43,342	36.63	
Total votes		118,315	100.00	

== See also ==
- Tennessee in the American Civil War
- Provisional Army of Tennessee
- East Tennessee Convention
- East Tennessee bridge burnings
- Confederate States of America
