= Ebenezer Dumont =

American politician

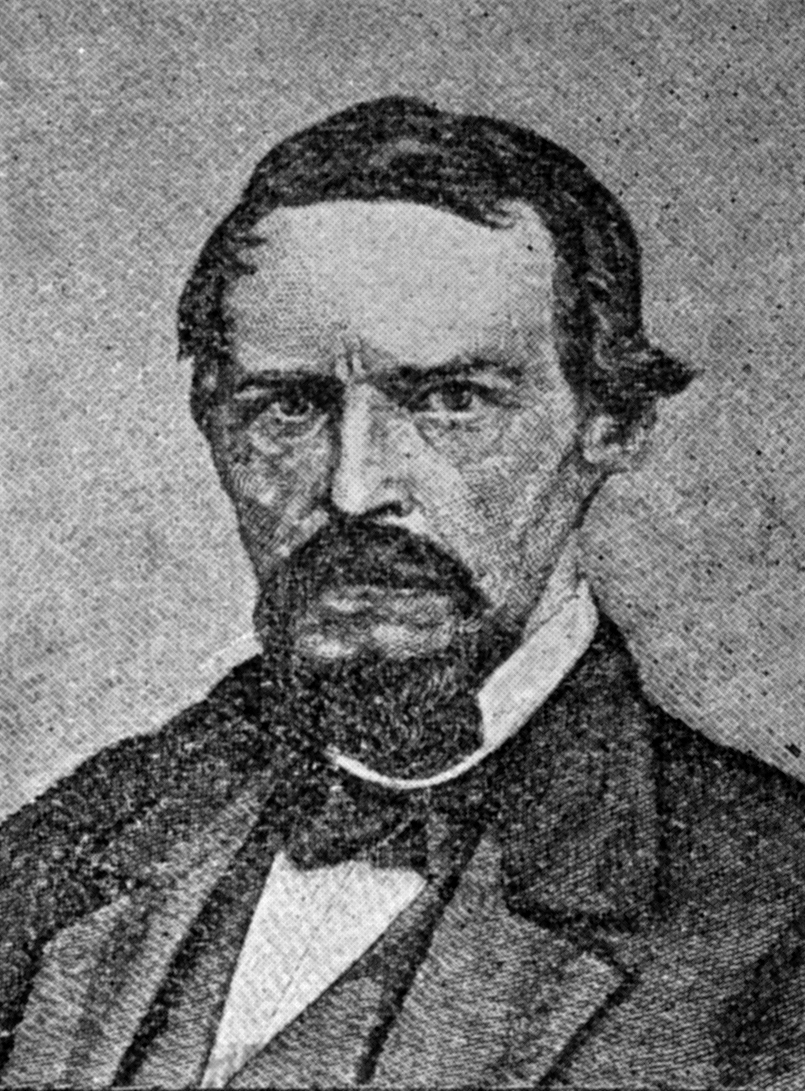
- Ebenezer Dumont from Who-When-What Book, 1900

Member of the U.S. House of Representatives from Indiana's 6th district
- In office March 4, 1863 – March 3, 1867
- Preceded by: Albert G. Porter
- Succeeded by: John Coburn

Personal details
- Born: November 23, 1814 Vevay, Indiana, US
- Died: April 16, 1871 (aged 56) Indianapolis, Indiana, US
- Resting place: Crown Hill Cemetery and Arboretum, Section 2, Lot 118; 39.8187231°N 86.1739465°W
- Party: Republican

Military service
- Allegiance: United States of America; Union
- Branch/service: United States Army; Union Army
- Years of service: 1846–1847, 1861–1863
- Rank: Brigadier General
- Battles/wars: Mexican-American War; American Civil War; Western Virginia Campaign; Battle of Lebanon

Ebenezer Dumont (November 23, 1814 – April 16, 1871) was a U.S. representative from Indiana, serving two terms from 1863 to 1867. Prior to his service in Congress, he was a general in the Union Army during the American Civil War.

== Early life and career ==
Born in Vevay, Indiana, his parents were John Dumont, who was a member of the Indiana Legislature in 1822–23, and was afterward a candidate for the office of Governor, against David Wallace, and Julia Louisa Dumont, educator and writer.

Dumont pursued classical studies at Hanover College and studied law. He was admitted to the bar and commenced practice in Vevay.

He served as a member of the Indiana House of Representatives in 1838. He served as the treasurer of Vevay from 1839 to 1845. He then signed up for military service during the Mexican–American War, serving as a lieutenant colonel of the 4th Indiana Infantry Regiment.

Upon his return to the Hoosier State, Dumont resumed his law practice. He served as a member of the Indiana House of Representatives in 1850 and 1853.

== Civil War ==
During the Civil War, Governor Oliver P. Morton appointed Dumont as colonel of the 7th Indiana Volunteer Infantry, which, after seeing initial action in western Virginia, primarily fought in the western theater. Dumont was promoted to brigadier general of volunteers on September 3, 1861, and served until February 28, 1863, when he resigned from the army to resume his political career.

== Congress ==
Dumont was elected as a Unionist to the Thirty-eighth Congress and was reelected as a Republican to the Thirty-ninth Congress (March 4, 1863 – March 3, 1867). He served as chairman of the Committee on District of Columbia (Thirty-eighth Congress) and the Committee on Expenditures in the Department of the Interior (Thirty-ninth Congress). He was not a candidate for renomination in 1866.

== Later career and death ==
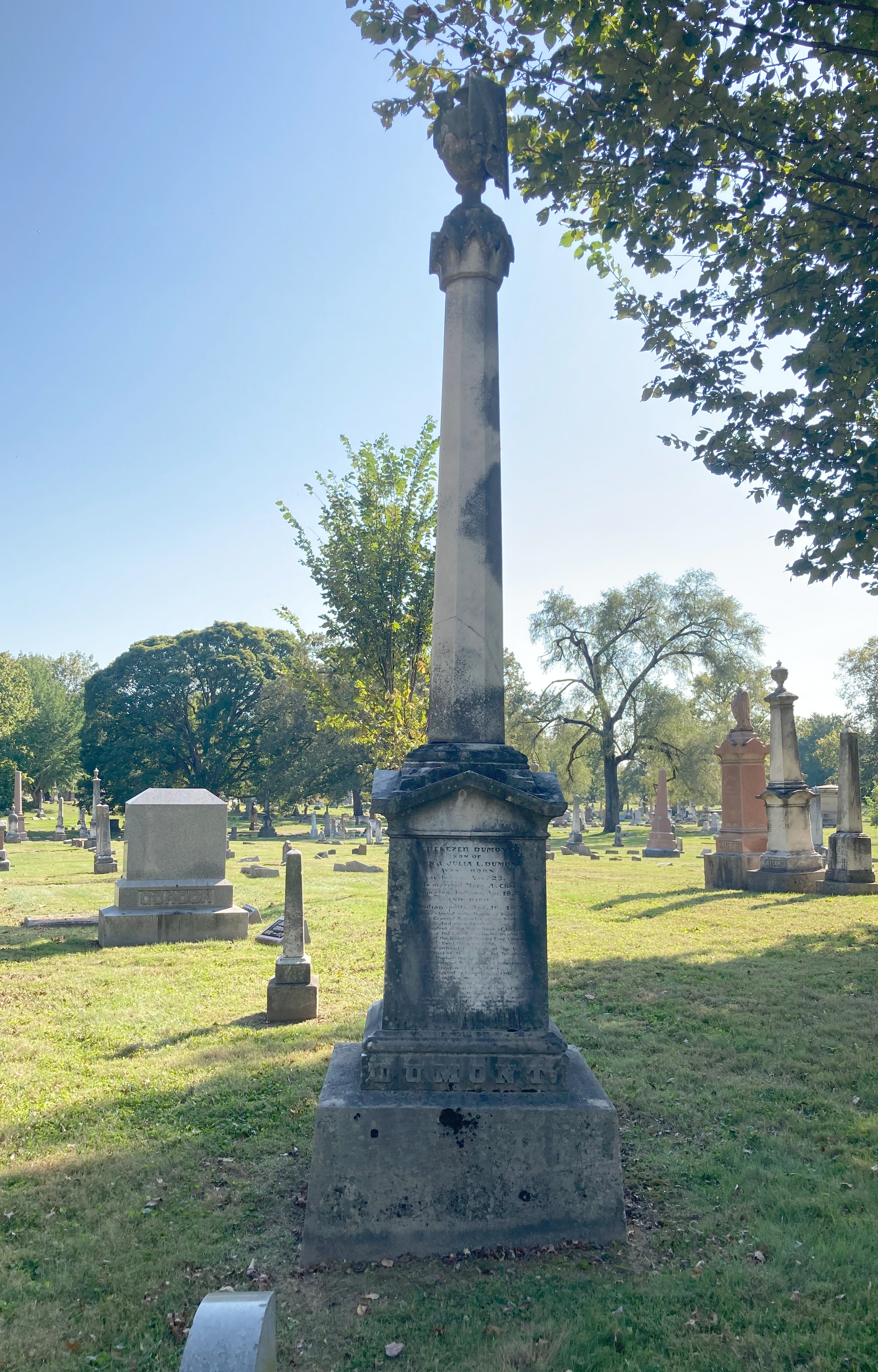
Dumont's grave at Crown Hill Cemetery

He was appointed by President Ulysses S. Grant as the Governor of Idaho Territory, but died in Indianapolis, Indiana, on April 16, 1871, before taking the oath of office. He was interred in Crown Hill Cemetery.

== See also ==
- List of American Civil War generals (Union)

U.S. House of Representatives
Preceded by Albert G. Porter	Member of the U.S. House of Representatives from Indiana's 6th congressional district 1863–1867	Succeeded by John Coburn
