= Battle of Lebanon (Tennessee) =

Battle of the American Civil War

- Part of the American Civil War
Date	May 5, 1862
Location	Lebanon, Tennessee
Result	Union victory

Belligerents
United States (Union)	(Confederate States of America) CSA (Confederacy)

Commanders and leaders
Ebenezer Dumont	John Hunt Morgan

Strength
600	800

Casualties and losses
10 killed 21 wounded 5 missing	60 killed unknown wounded 150 captured

The Battle of Lebanon was a small battle fought near Lebanon, Tennessee during the American Civil War on May 5, 1862.

== Background ==
Union General Ebenezer Dumont pursued Colonel John Hunt Morgan's Confederate cavalry with a force from the Nashville Garrison. Dumont's force consisted of detachments from the 1st Kentucky Cavalry under Colonel Frank Lane Wolford, the 4th Kentucky Cavalry under Colonel Green Clay Smith, and the 7th Pennsylvania Cavalry under Colonel Wynkoop. Morgan's force was the 2nd Kentucky Cavalry Regiment.

== Battle ==
Dumont surprised Morgan early on the morning of May 5, 1862. A 15-mile running battle ensued in which the Confederates were forced to retreat. During the fighting Confederate sympathizers in the town fired upon the Union Cavalry. Many of the remaining Confederates barricaded within the buildings surrendered when Dumont threatened to set the town on fire.

== Aftermath ==
150 Confederates were taken prisoner including Lt. Colonel Wood. Colonels Smith and Wolford of the Union forces were wounded.
