= List of governors of Tennessee =

The governor of Tennessee is the head of government of the U.S. state of Tennessee.

Tennessee has had 50 governors, including the incumbent, Bill Lee. Seven governors (John Sevier, William Carroll, Andrew Johnson, Robert Love Taylor, Gordon Browning, Frank G. Clement, and Buford Ellington) have served non-consecutive terms. This tally does not include William Blount (the territorial governor) or Robert L. Caruthers (who never took office), though the Blue Book includes them in its list of governors. All governors are counted only once, regardless of number of terms served (e.g., John Sevier is considered the 1st governor, rather than the 1st and 3rd governor). The Blue Book does not include Edward H. East in its list of governors.

== List of governors ==
=== Southwest Territory ===
The Territory South of the Ohio River, commonly known as the Southwest Territory, was organized on May 26, 1790.

Throughout its 6-year history, Southwest Territory had only one governor appointed by the federal government, William Blount.

Governor of the Territory Southwest of the River Ohio
Governor	Term in office (Note: The range given is from the date the governor was confirmed by the Senate, or appointed by the President during a Senate recess, to the date the governor's successor was confirmed, unless noted.)	Appointed by
William Blount (1749–1800)	June 8, 1790 (Note: Blount was nominated on June 7, 1790; confirmed by the Senate on June 8; and took the oath of office on September 20. He was reconfirmed by the Senate on December 11, 1794.) – March 28, 1796 (2121 days; statehood)	George Washington

=== State of Tennessee ===
Southwest Territory was admitted to the Union as Tennessee on June 1, 1796.

The first constitution of Tennessee, enacted in 1796, set a term of two years for the governor and provided that no person could serve as governor for more than 6 years in any 8-year period. The term of office was lengthened to four years, without the possibility of consecutive terms, by constitutional amendments adopted in 1953. Under the current provisions of the state constitution, as amended in 1978, the governor is elected to a four-year term and may serve no more than two terms consecutively.

Governors of the State of Tennessee
No.	Governor	Term in office	Party	Election	Lt. Governor (Note: Lieutenant governors represented the same party as their governor unless noted.)
1	John Sevier (1745–1815)	March 30, 1796 – September 23, 1801 (2003 days; term-limited) (Note: Under the 1796 constitution, governors were ineligible to serve more than six years in any term of eight.)	Democratic- Republican	1796	Office did not exist
1	John Sevier (1745–1815)	March 30, 1796 – September 23, 1801 (2003 days; term-limited)	Democratic- Republican	1797	Office did not exist
1	John Sevier (1745–1815)	March 30, 1796 – September 23, 1801 (2003 days; term-limited)	Democratic- Republican	1799	Office did not exist
2	Archibald Roane (d. 1819)	September 23, 1801 – September 23, 1803 (731 days; lost election)	Democratic- Republican	1801	Office did not exist
1	John Sevier (1745–1815)	September 23, 1803 – September 20, 1809 (2190 days; term-limited)	Democratic- Republican	1803	Office did not exist
1	John Sevier (1745–1815)	September 23, 1803 – September 20, 1809 (2190 days; term-limited)	Democratic- Republican	1805	Office did not exist
1	John Sevier (1745–1815)	September 23, 1803 – September 20, 1809 (2190 days; term-limited)	Democratic- Republican	1807	Office did not exist
3	Willie Blount (1768–1835)	September 20, 1809 – September 27, 1815 (2199 days; term-limited)	Democratic- Republican	1809	Office did not exist
3	Willie Blount (1768–1835)	September 20, 1809 – September 27, 1815 (2199 days; term-limited)	Democratic- Republican	1811	Office did not exist
3	Willie Blount (1768–1835)	September 20, 1809 – September 27, 1815 (2199 days; term-limited)	Democratic- Republican	1813	Office did not exist
4	Joseph McMinn (1758–1824)	September 27, 1815 – October 1, 1821 (2197 days; term-limited)	Democratic- Republican	1815	Office did not exist
4	Joseph McMinn (1758–1824)	September 27, 1815 – October 1, 1821 (2197 days; term-limited)	Democratic- Republican	1817	Office did not exist
4	Joseph McMinn (1758–1824)	September 27, 1815 – October 1, 1821 (2197 days; term-limited)	Democratic- Republican	1819	Office did not exist
5	William Carroll (1788–1844)	October 1, 1821 – October 1, 1827 (2192 days; term-limited)	Democratic- Republican	1821	Office did not exist
5	William Carroll (1788–1844)	October 1, 1821 – October 1, 1827 (2192 days; term-limited)	Democratic- Republican	1823	Office did not exist
5	William Carroll (1788–1844)	October 1, 1821 – October 1, 1827 (2192 days; term-limited)	Democratic- Republican	1825	Office did not exist
6	Sam Houston (1793–1863)	October 1, 1827 – April 16, 1829 (564 days; resigned) (Note: Houston resigned with no specific reasoning, but it was during the collapse of his marriage.)	Democratic	1827	Office did not exist
7	William Hall (1775–1856)	April 16, 1829 – October 1, 1829 (169 days; retired)	Democratic	Succeeded from speaker of the Senate	Office did not exist
5	William Carroll (1788–1844)	October 1, 1829 – October 12, 1835 (2203 days; term-limited)	Democratic (Note: Carroll is labeled a Jackson Democrat by Kallenbach, and a Democratic-Republican by Glashan.)	1829	Office did not exist
5	William Carroll (1788–1844)	October 1, 1829 – October 12, 1835 (2203 days; term-limited)	Democratic	1831	Office did not exist
5	William Carroll (1788–1844)	October 1, 1829 – October 12, 1835 (2203 days; term-limited)	Democratic	1833	Office did not exist
8	Newton Cannon (1781–1841)	October 12, 1835 – October 14, 1839 (1464 days; lost election)	Whig (Note: Dubin and Kallenbach label Cannon's party affiliation in 1835 as Anti-Van Buren Democratic.)	1835	Office did not exist
8	Newton Cannon (1781–1841)	October 12, 1835 – October 14, 1839 (1464 days; lost election)	Whig	1837	Office did not exist
9	James K. Polk (1795–1849)	October 14, 1839 – October 14, 1841 (732 days; lost election)	Democratic	1839	Office did not exist
10	James C. Jones (1809–1859)	October 14, 1841 – October 15, 1845 (1463 days; retired)	Whig	1841	Office did not exist
10	James C. Jones (1809–1859)	October 14, 1841 – October 15, 1845 (1463 days; retired)	Whig	1843	Office did not exist
11	Aaron V. Brown (1795–1859)	October 15, 1845 – October 17, 1847 (733 days; lost election)	Democratic	1845	Office did not exist
12	Neill S. Brown (1810–1886)	October 17, 1847 – October 16, 1849 (731 days; lost election)	Whig	1847	Office did not exist
13	William Trousdale (1790–1872)	October 16, 1849 – October 16, 1851 (731 days; lost election)	Democratic	1849	Office did not exist
14	William B. Campbell (1807–1867)	October 16, 1851 – October 17, 1853 (733 days; retired)	Whig	1851	Office did not exist
15	Andrew Johnson (1808–1875)	October 17, 1853 – November 3, 1857 (1479 days; retired) (Note: Johnson was instead elected to the United States Senate.)	Democratic	1853	Office did not exist
15	Andrew Johnson (1808–1875)	October 17, 1853 – November 3, 1857 (1479 days; retired)	Democratic	1855	Office did not exist
16	Isham G. Harris (1818–1897)	November 3, 1857 – March 12, 1862 (1591 days; deposed) (Note: Harris fled Nashville for Memphis after the Battle of Fort Donelson in February 1862, and was later driven from the state by Union forces as he worked with the Confederate army. Johnson was appointed military governor of Tennessee on March 12, 1862, by the Union forces occupying Middle and East Tennessee. Meanwhile, the Confederate-held portions of West Tennessee held an election in August 1863, in which Harris would have been term-limited, and elected Robert L. Caruthers governor. However, as the legislature was unable to convene, Caruthers was never able to take office.)	Democratic	1857	Office did not exist
16	Isham G. Harris (1818–1897)	November 3, 1857 – March 12, 1862 (1591 days; deposed)	Democratic	1859	Office did not exist
16	Isham G. Harris (1818–1897)	November 3, 1857 – March 12, 1862 (1591 days; deposed)	Democratic	1861	Office did not exist
15	Andrew Johnson (1808–1875)	March 12, 1862 (Note: Johnson was appointed military governor on March 4; he arrived in Nashville on March 12.) – March 4, 1865 (1089 days; resigned) (Note: Johnson resigned, having been elected Vice President of the United States.)	Military governor appointed by President		Office did not exist
—	Edward H. East (1830–1904)	March 4, 1865 – April 5, 1865 (33 days; retired)	Secretary of state acting		Office did not exist
17	Parson Brownlow (1805–1877)	April 5, 1865 – February 25, 1869 (1423 days; resigned) (Note: Brownlow resigned, having been elected to the United States Senate.)	Republican	1865	Office did not exist
17	Parson Brownlow (1805–1877)	April 5, 1865 – February 25, 1869 (1423 days; resigned)	Republican	1867	Office did not exist
18	Dewitt Clinton Senter (1830–1898)	February 25, 1869 – October 10, 1871 (958 days; retired)	Republican	Succeeded from speaker of the Senate	Office did not exist
18	Dewitt Clinton Senter (1830–1898)	February 25, 1869 – October 10, 1871 (958 days; retired)	Republican	1869	Office did not exist
19	John C. Brown (1827–1889)	October 10, 1871 – January 18, 1875 (1197 days; retired) (Note: Brown instead ran unsuccessfully for the United States Senate.)	Democratic	1870	Office did not exist
19	John C. Brown (1827–1889)	October 10, 1871 – January 18, 1875 (1197 days; retired)	Democratic	1872	Office did not exist
20	James D. Porter (1828–1912)	January 18, 1875 – February 16, 1879 (1491 days; retired)	Democratic	1874	Office did not exist
20	James D. Porter (1828–1912)	January 18, 1875 – February 16, 1879 (1491 days; retired)	Democratic	1876	Office did not exist
21	Albert S. Marks (1836–1891)	February 16, 1879 – January 17, 1881 (702 days; retired)	Democratic	1878	Office did not exist
22	Alvin Hawkins (1821–1905)	January 17, 1881 – January 15, 1883 (729 days; lost election)	Republican	1880	Office did not exist
23	William B. Bate (1826–1905)	January 15, 1883 – January 17, 1887 (1464 days; retired) (Note: Bate was instead elected to the United States Senate.)	Democratic	1882	Office did not exist
23	William B. Bate (1826–1905)	January 15, 1883 – January 17, 1887 (1464 days; retired)	Democratic	1884	Office did not exist
24	Robert Love Taylor (1850–1912)	January 17, 1887 – January 19, 1891 (1464 days; retired)	Democratic	1886	Office did not exist
24	Robert Love Taylor (1850–1912)	January 17, 1887 – January 19, 1891 (1464 days; retired)	Democratic	1888	Office did not exist
25	John P. Buchanan (1847–1930)	January 19, 1891 – January 16, 1893 (729 days; lost election)	Democratic	1890	Office did not exist
26	Peter Turney (1827–1903)	January 16, 1893 – January 21, 1897 (1467 days; retired)	Democratic	1892	Office did not exist
26	Peter Turney (1827–1903)	January 16, 1893 – January 21, 1897 (1467 days; retired)	Democratic	1894	Office did not exist
24	Robert Love Taylor (1850–1912)	January 21, 1897 – January 16, 1899 (726 days; retired)	Democratic	1896	Office did not exist
27	Benton McMillin (1845–1933)	January 16, 1899 – January 20, 1903 (1465 days; retired)	Democratic	1898	Office did not exist
27	Benton McMillin (1845–1933)	January 16, 1899 – January 20, 1903 (1465 days; retired)	Democratic	1900	Office did not exist
28	James B. Frazier (1856–1937)	January 20, 1903 – March 27, 1905 (798 days; resigned) (Note: Frazier resigned, having been elected to the United States Senate.)	Democratic	1902	Office did not exist
28	James B. Frazier (1856–1937)	January 20, 1903 – March 27, 1905 (798 days; resigned)	Democratic	1904	Office did not exist
29	John I. Cox (1855–1946)	March 27, 1905 – January 17, 1907 (662 days; lost nomination)	Democratic	Succeeded from speaker of the Senate	Office did not exist
30	Malcolm R. Patterson (1861–1935)	January 17, 1907 – January 25, 1911 (1470 days; withdrew) (Note: Patterson received the Democratic nomination, but withdrew after a schism in the party.)	Democratic	1906	Office did not exist
30	Malcolm R. Patterson (1861–1935)	January 17, 1907 – January 25, 1911 (1470 days; withdrew)	Democratic	1908	Office did not exist
31	Ben W. Hooper (1870–1957)	January 25, 1911 – January 15, 1915 (1452 days; lost election)	Republican	1910	Office did not exist
31	Ben W. Hooper (1870–1957)	January 25, 1911 – January 15, 1915 (1452 days; lost election)	Republican	1912	Office did not exist
32	Thomas Clarke Rye (1863–1953)	January 15, 1915 – January 15, 1919 (1462 days; retired)	Democratic	1914	Office did not exist
32	Thomas Clarke Rye (1863–1953)	January 15, 1915 – January 15, 1919 (1462 days; retired)	Democratic	1916	Office did not exist
33	Albert H. Roberts (1868–1946)	January 15, 1919 – January 15, 1921 (732 days; lost election)	Democratic	1918	Office did not exist
34	Alfred A. Taylor (1848–1931)	January 15, 1921 – January 16, 1923 (732 days; lost election)	Republican	1920	Office did not exist
35	Austin Peay (1876–1927)	January 16, 1923 – October 2, 1927 (1721 days; died in office)	Democratic	1922	Office did not exist
35	Austin Peay (1876–1927)	January 16, 1923 – October 2, 1927 (1721 days; died in office)	Democratic	1924	Office did not exist
35	Austin Peay (1876–1927)	January 16, 1923 – October 2, 1927 (1721 days; died in office)	Democratic	1926	Office did not exist
36	Henry Hollis Horton (1866–1934)	October 2, 1927 – January 17, 1933 (1935 days; retired)	Democratic	Succeeded from speaker of the Senate	Office did not exist
36	Henry Hollis Horton (1866–1934)	October 2, 1927 – January 17, 1933 (1935 days; retired)	Democratic	1928	Office did not exist
36	Henry Hollis Horton (1866–1934)	October 2, 1927 – January 17, 1933 (1935 days; retired)	Democratic	1930	Office did not exist
37	Hill McAlister (1875–1959)	January 17, 1933 – January 15, 1937 (1460 days; retired)	Democratic	1932	Office did not exist
37	Hill McAlister (1875–1959)	January 17, 1933 – January 15, 1937 (1460 days; retired)	Democratic	1934	Office did not exist
38	Gordon Browning (1889–1976)	January 15, 1937 – January 16, 1939 (732 days; lost nomination)	Democratic	1936	Office did not exist
39	Prentice Cooper (1895–1969)	January 16, 1939 – January 16, 1945 (2193 days; term-limited) (Note: Under the 1870 constitution, governors were ineligible to serve more than six years in any term of eight.)	Democratic	1938	Office did not exist
39	Prentice Cooper (1895–1969)	January 16, 1939 – January 16, 1945 (2193 days; term-limited)	Democratic	1940	Office did not exist
39	Prentice Cooper (1895–1969)	January 16, 1939 – January 16, 1945 (2193 days; term-limited)	Democratic	1942	Office did not exist
40	Jim Nance McCord (1879–1968)	January 16, 1945 – January 17, 1949 (1463 days; lost nomination)	Democratic	1944	Office did not exist
40	Jim Nance McCord (1879–1968)	January 16, 1945 – January 17, 1949 (1463 days; lost nomination)	Democratic	1946	Office did not exist
38	Gordon Browning (1889–1976)	January 17, 1949 – January 15, 1953 (1460 days; lost nomination)	Democratic	1948	Office did not exist
38	Gordon Browning (1889–1976)	January 17, 1949 – January 15, 1953 (1460 days; lost nomination)	Democratic	1950	Walter M. Haynes
41	Frank G. Clement (1920–1969)	January 15, 1953 – January 19, 1959 (2196 days; term-limited) (Note: Under a 1953 amendment to the constitution, governors were ineligible to succeed themselves.)	Democratic	1952	Jared Maddux
41	Frank G. Clement (1920–1969)	January 15, 1953 – January 19, 1959 (2196 days; term-limited)	Democratic	1954	Jared Maddux
42	Buford Ellington (1907–1972)	January 19, 1959 – January 15, 1963 (1458 days; term-limited)	Democratic	1958	William D. Baird
41	Frank G. Clement (1920–1969)	January 15, 1963 – January 16, 1967 (1463 days; term-limited)	Democratic	1962	James L. Bomar Jr.
41	Frank G. Clement (1920–1969)	January 15, 1963 – January 16, 1967 (1463 days; term-limited)	Democratic	1962	Jared Maddux
42	Buford Ellington (1907–1972)	January 16, 1967 – January 16, 1971 (1462 days; term-limited)	Democratic	1966	Frank Gorrell
43	Winfield Dunn (1927–2024)	January 16, 1971 – January 18, 1975 (1464 days; term-limited)	Republican	1970	John Shelton Wilder (Note: Represented the Democratic Party)
44	Ray Blanton (1930–1996)	January 18, 1975 – January 17, 1979 (1461 days; retired)	Democratic	1974	John Shelton Wilder
45	Lamar Alexander (b. 1940)	January 17, 1979 – January 17, 1987 (2923 days; term-limited) (Note: Under a 1978 amendment to the constitution, governors are ineligible for election to more than two consecutive terms.)	Republican	1978	John Shelton Wilder
45	Lamar Alexander (b. 1940)	January 17, 1979 – January 17, 1987 (2923 days; term-limited)	Republican	1982	John Shelton Wilder
46	Ned McWherter (1930–2011)	January 17, 1987 – January 21, 1995 (2927 days; term-limited)	Democratic	1986	John Shelton Wilder
46	Ned McWherter (1930–2011)	January 17, 1987 – January 21, 1995 (2927 days; term-limited)	Democratic	1990	John Shelton Wilder
47	Don Sundquist (1936–2023)	January 21, 1995 – January 18, 2003 (2920 days; term-limited)	Republican	1994	John Shelton Wilder
47	Don Sundquist (1936–2023)	January 21, 1995 – January 18, 2003 (2920 days; term-limited)	Republican	1998	John Shelton Wilder
48	Phil Bredesen (b. 1943)	January 18, 2003 – January 15, 2011 (2920 days; term-limited)	Democratic	2002	John Shelton Wilder
48	Phil Bredesen (b. 1943)	January 18, 2003 – January 15, 2011 (2920 days; term-limited)	Democratic	2006	Ron Ramsey (Note: Represented the Republican Party)
49	Bill Haslam (b. 1958)	January 15, 2011 – January 19, 2019 (2927 days; term-limited)	Republican	2010	Ron Ramsey
49	Bill Haslam (b. 1958)	January 15, 2011 – January 19, 2019 (2927 days; term-limited)	Republican	2014	Ron Ramsey
49	Bill Haslam (b. 1958)	January 15, 2011 – January 19, 2019 (2927 days; term-limited)	Republican	2014	Randy McNally
50	Bill Lee (b. 1959)	January 19, 2019 – Incumbent (Note: Lee's second term began on January 21, 2023, and will expire on January 16, 2027; he is term-limited.) (in office 2865 days)	Republican	2018	Randy McNally
50	Bill Lee (b. 1959)	January 19, 2019 – Incumbent (in office 2865 days)	Republican	2022	Randy McNally
51	Marsha Blackburn (b. 1952)	Governor-elect takes office January 16, 2027	Republican	2026	Jack Johnson

== See also ==
- Gubernatorial lines of succession in the United States § Tennessee
- Speaker of the Tennessee Senate and Lieutenant Governor of Tennessee
- List of Tennessee General Assemblies

== Sources ==
- "Former Tennessee Governors". National Governors Association.
- "Tennessee Constitution". State Democracy Research Initiative. University of Wisconsin Law School.
- Dubin, Michael J. (2003). United States Gubernatorial Elections, 1776–1860: The Official Results by State and County. McFarland. ISBN 0-7864-1439-1 – via Internet Archive.
- Glashan, Roy R. (1979). American Governors and Gubernatorial Elections, 1775-1978. Meckler Books. ISBN 0-7201-1511-6 – via Internet Archive.
- Kallenbach, Joseph E.; Kallenbach, Jessamine S. (1977). American State Governors, 1776-1976. Oceana Publications. ISBN 978-0-379-00665-0 – via Internet Archive.
- McMullin, Thomas A.; Walker, David (1984). Biographical Directory of American Territorial Governors. Meckler Publishing. ISBN 0-930466-11-X – via Internet Archive.
- Mullaney, Marie Marmo (1994). Biographical Directory of the Governors of the United States, 1988–1994. Greenwood Publishing Group. ISBN 0-313-28312-5 – via Internet Archive.
- Sobel, Robert; Raimo, John (1978). Biographical Directory of the Governors of the United States, 1789-1978. Vol. 4. Meckler Books. ISBN 0-930466-01-2 – via Internet Archive.
- Thorpe, Francis Newton, ed. (1909). The Federal and State Constitutions, Colonial Charters, and Other Organic Laws of the States, Territories, and Colonies Now or Heretofore Forming the United States of America. Vol. 6. United States Government Publishing Office – via Internet Archive.
