= 1849 Tennessee gubernatorial election =

- August 2, 1849
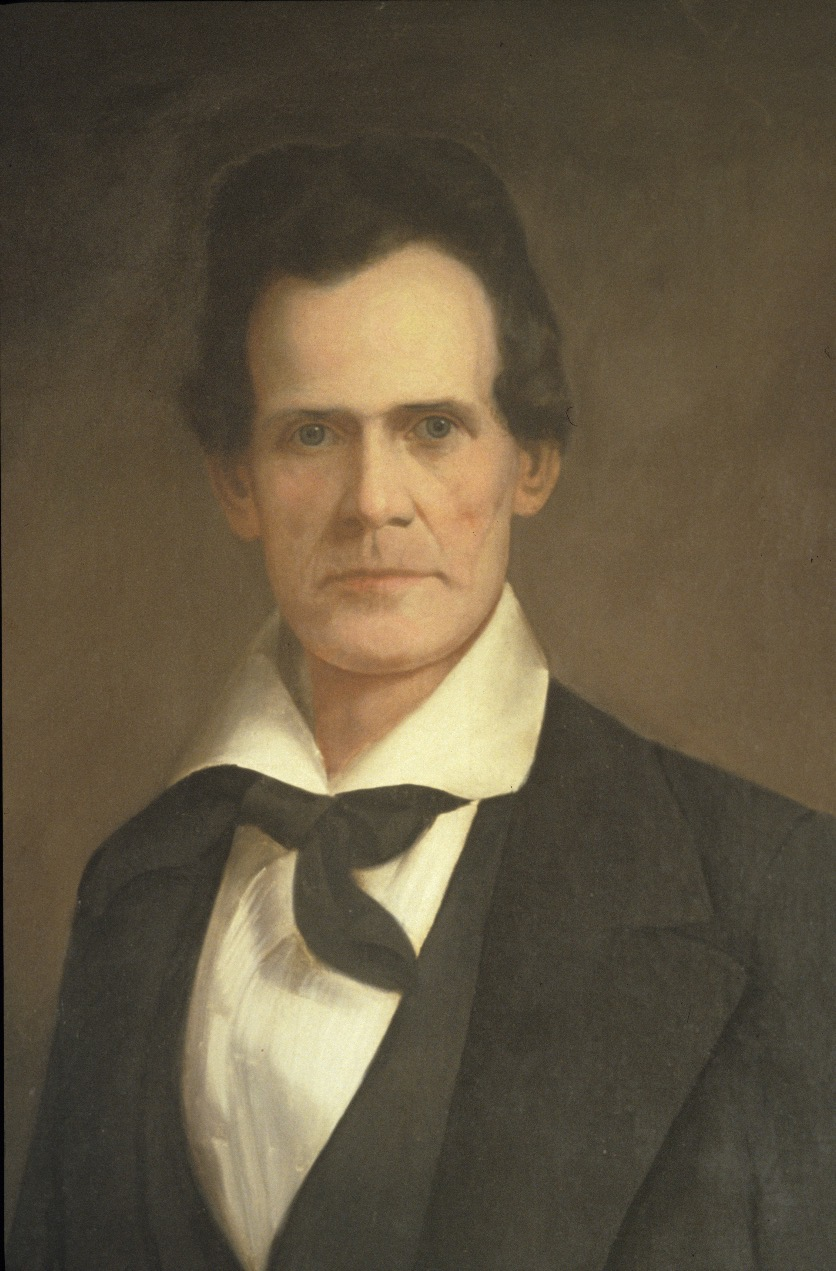

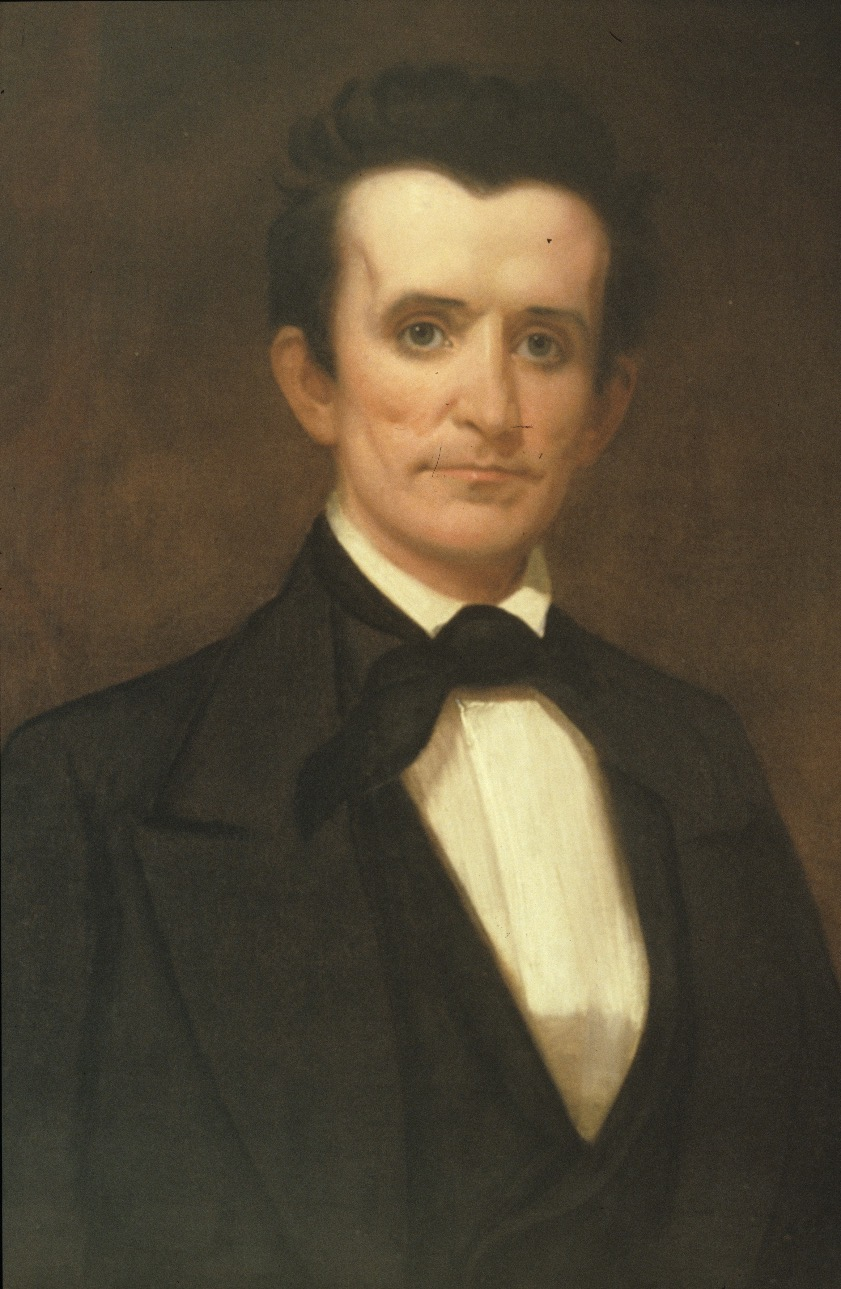
Nominee	William Trousdale	Neill S. Brown
Party	Democratic	Whig
Popular vote	61,740	60,350
Percentage	50.57%	49.43%
- County results Trousdale: 50–60% 60–70% 70–80% 80–90% Brown: 50–60% 60–70% 70–80% 80–90% 90–100% No Data/Vote
Governor before election
Neill S. Brown
Whig
Elected Governor
William Trousdale
Democratic

The 1849 Tennessee gubernatorial election was held on August 2, 1849, to elect the Governor of Tennessee. Democratic nominee and Colonel in the US Army William Trousdale defeated Whig nominee and incumbent Governor Neill S. Brown by a slim margin.

== General election ==
On election day, August 2, 1849, Democratic nominee William Trousdale won the election by a margin of 574 votes against his opponent Whig nominee and incumbent Governor Neill S. Brown, thereby gaining Democratic control over the office of Governor. Trousdale was sworn in as the 13th Governor of Tennessee on October 16, 1849.

=== Results ===
Tennessee gubernatorial election, 1849
Party	Candidate	Votes	%
Democratic	William Trousdale	61,740	50.57
Whig	Neill S. Brown (incumbent)	60,350	49.43
Total votes		122,090	100.00
Democratic gain from Whig			
