= 1847 Tennessee gubernatorial election =

- August 5, 1847
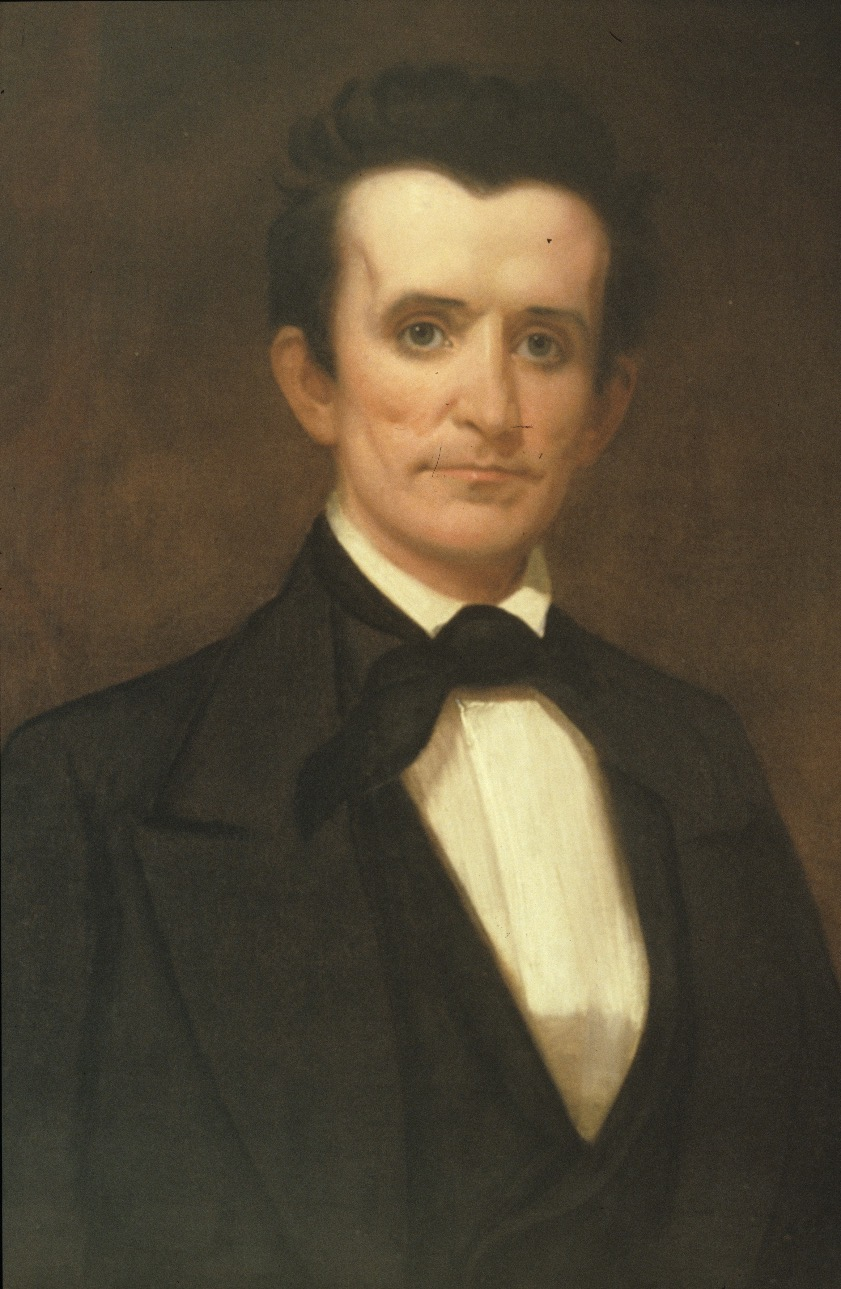

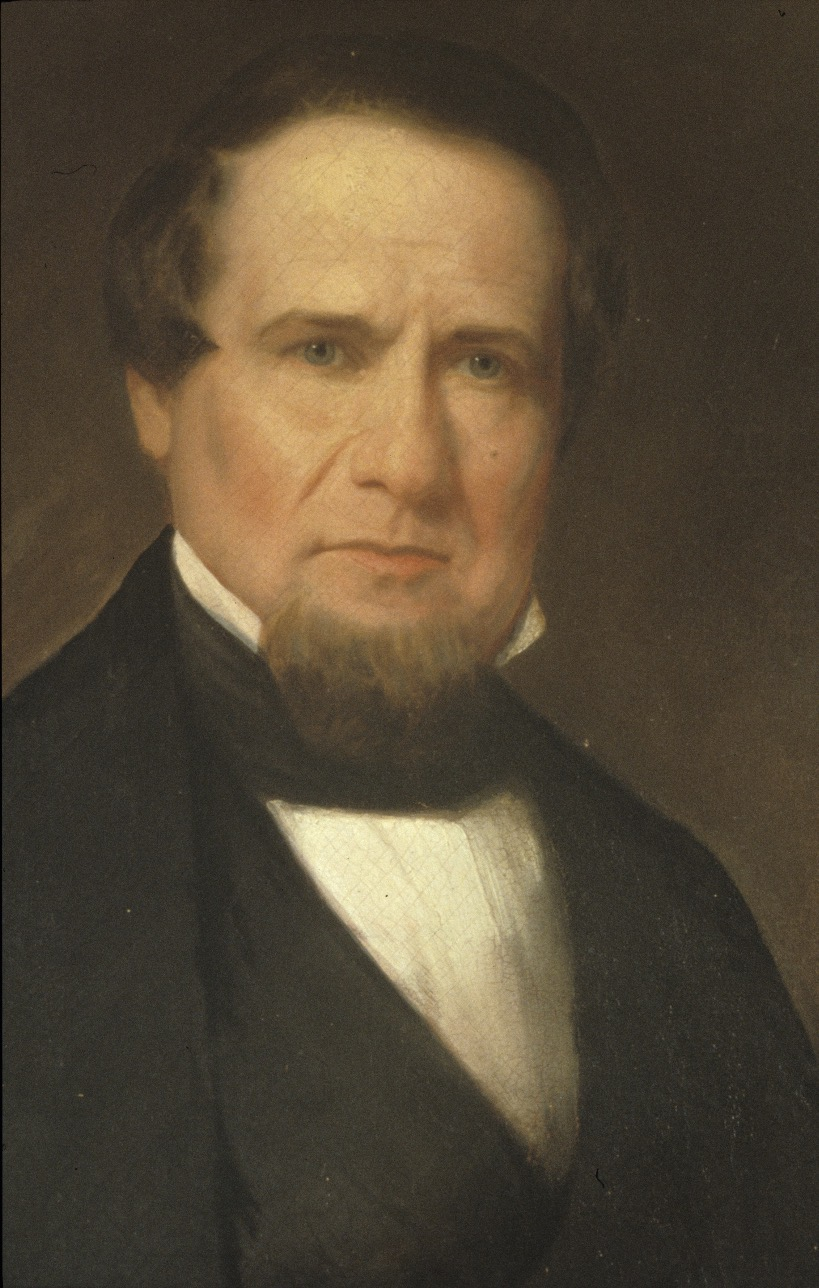
Nominee	Neill S. Brown	Aaron V. Brown
Party	Whig	Democratic
Popular vote	61,372	60,004
Percentage	50.56%	49.44%
- County results S. Brown: 50–60% 60–70% 70–80% 80–90% V. Brown: 50–60% 60–70% 70–80% 80–90% No data/No votes
Governor before election
Aaron V. Brown
Democratic
Elected Governor
Neill S. Brown
Whig

The 1847 Tennessee gubernatorial election was held on August 5, 1847, to elect the Governor of Tennessee. Whig nominee and former member of the Tennessee House of Representatives Neill S. Brown defeated Democratic nominee and incumbent Governor Aaron V. Brown.

== Background ==
Aaron V. Brown, then governor of Tennessee, was closely connected with James K. Polk, his former law partner and friend, who had recently become President of the United States. When the Mexican–American War began, Brown issued a call for 2,800 volunteer soldiers to serve in the conflict. Over 30,000 Tennesseans answered, solidifying the state’s reputation as the "Volunteer State," a reputation first earned when citizens answered a similar call during the War of 1812. While initially popular, support for the war gradually declined, and Brown was defeated in his re-election bid by Neill S. Brown (no relation) in 1847.

== General election ==
On election day, August 5, 1847, Whig nominee Neill S. Brown won the election by a margin of 1,368 votes against his opponent Democratic nominee and incumbent Governor Aaron V. Brown, thereby gaining Whig control over the office of Governor. Brown was sworn in as the 12th Governor of Tennessee on October 17, 1847.

=== Results ===
Tennessee gubernatorial election, 1847
Party	Candidate	Votes	%
Whig	Neill S. Brown	61,372	50.56
Democratic	Aaron V. Brown (incumbent)	60,004	49.44
Total votes		121,376	100.00
Whig gain from Democratic			
