= 1809 Tennessee gubernatorial election =

- August 3–4, 1809
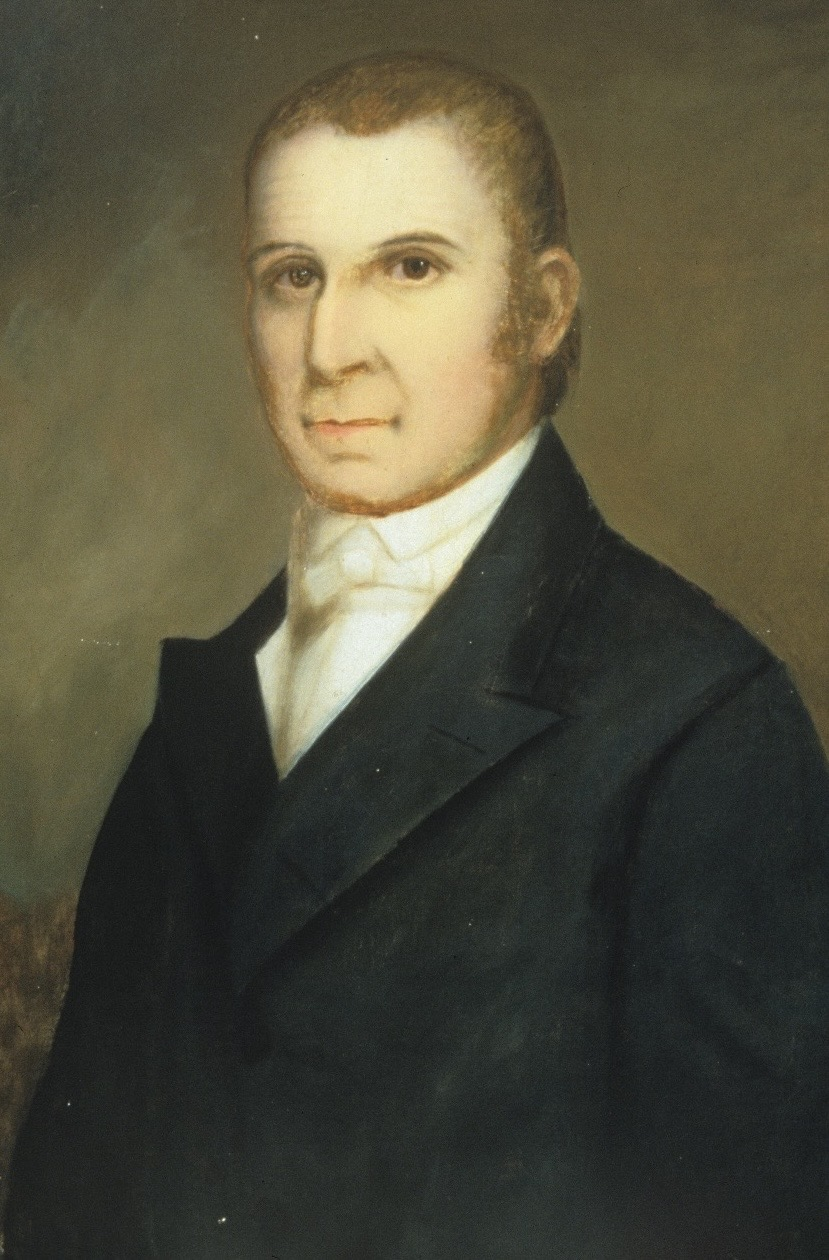

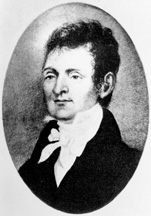
Nominee	Willie Blount	William Cocke
Party	Democratic-Republican	Democratic-Republican
Popular vote	13,686	8,435
Percentage	61.87%	38.13%
- County results Blount: 50–60% 60–70% 80–90% >90% Cocke: 50–60% 60–70% 70–80% 80–90% No data/No votes
Governor before election
John Sevier
Democratic-Republican
Elected Governor
Willie Blount
Democratic-Republican

The 1809 Tennessee gubernatorial election was held between August 3 and 4, 1809 in order to elect the Governor of Tennessee. Democratic-Republican candidate and incumbent member of the Tennessee House of Representatives Willie Blount defeated fellow Democratic-Republican candidate, former United States Senator from Tennessee and candidate for Governor in the previous election William Cocke.

== General election ==
On election day, August 3, 1809, Democratic-Republican candidate Willie Blount won the election by a margin of 5,251 votes against his opponent and fellow Democratic-Republican candidate William Cocke, thereby retaining Democratic-Republican control over the office of Governor. Blount was sworn in as the 3rd Governor of Tennessee on September 20, 1809.

=== Results ===
Tennessee gubernatorial election, 1809
Party	Candidate	Votes	%
Democratic-Republican	Willie Blount	13,686	61.87
Democratic-Republican	William Cocke	8,435	38.13
Total votes		22,121	100.00
Democratic-Republican hold			
