= 1811 Tennessee gubernatorial election =

- August 1–2, 1811
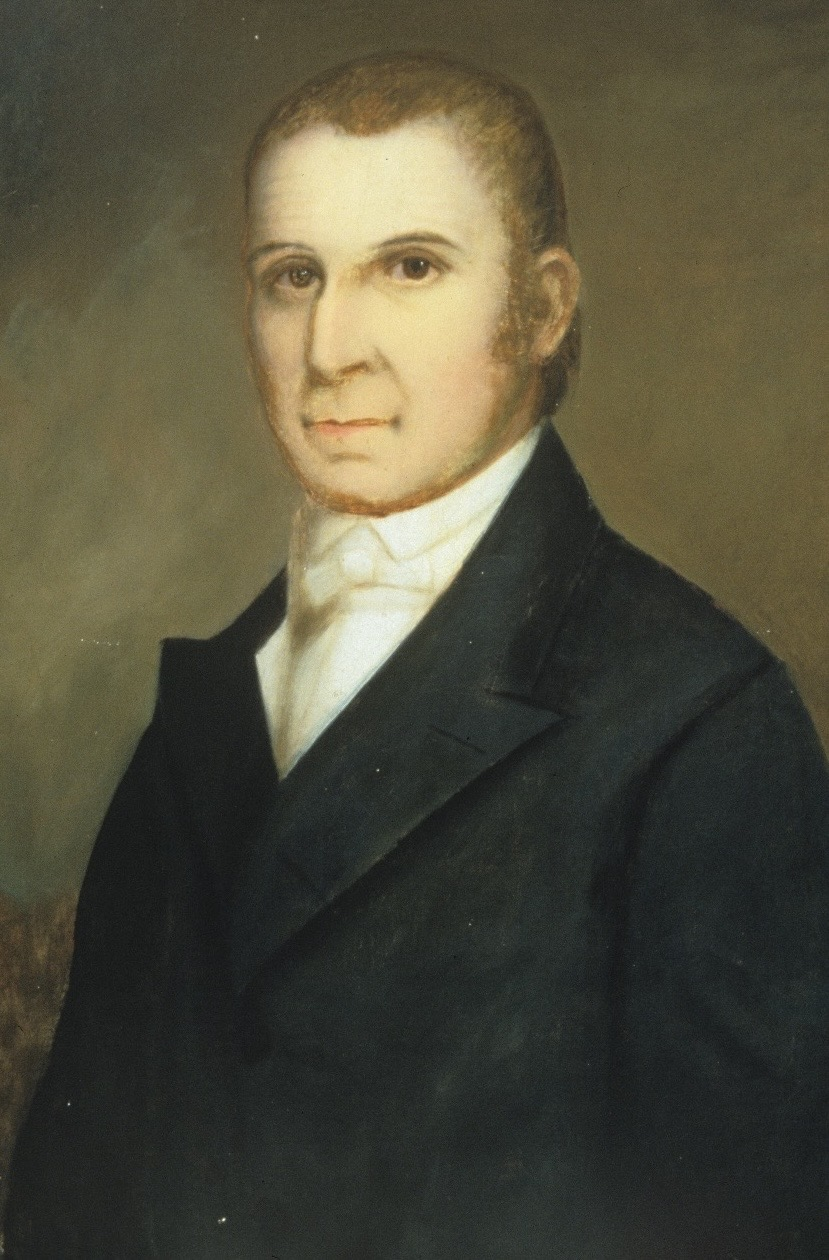
| Nominee | Willie Blount |
| Party | Democratic-Republican |
| Popular vote | 19,980 |
| Percentage | 100.00% |
Governor before election
Willie Blount
Democratic-Republican
Elected Governor
Willie Blount
Democratic-Republican

The 1811 Tennessee gubernatorial election was held between August 1 and 2, 1811 in order to elect the Governor of Tennessee. Democratic-Republican nominee and incumbent Governor Willie Blount was re-elected unanimously as he ran unopposed.

== General election ==
On election day, August 1, 1811, Democratic-Republican candidate Willie Blount won re-election unanimously as he ran unopposed, thereby retaining Democratic-Republican control over the office of Governor. Blount was sworn in for his second term on September 20, 1811.

=== Results ===
Tennessee gubernatorial election, 1811
| Party | Candidate | Votes | % |
|---|---|---|---|
| Democratic-Republican | Willie Blount (incumbent) | 19,980 | 100.00 |
| Total votes | | 19,980 | 100.00 |
| Democratic-Republican hold | | | |
