= Governor Blount =

Governor Blount may refer to:

- William Blount (1749–1800), Governor of the Southwest Territory
- Willie Blount (1768–1835), his half-brother, Governor of Tennessee
