= 1851 Tennessee gubernatorial election =

- August 7, 1851
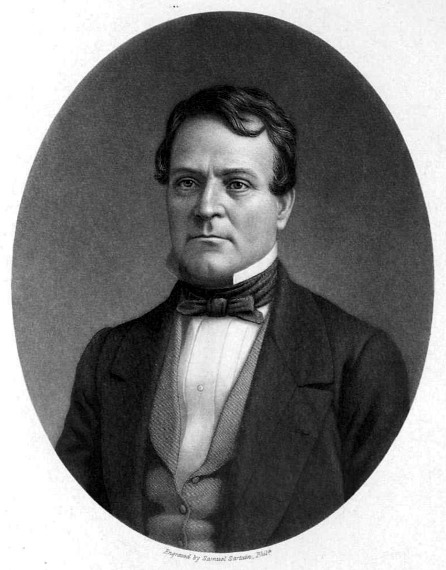

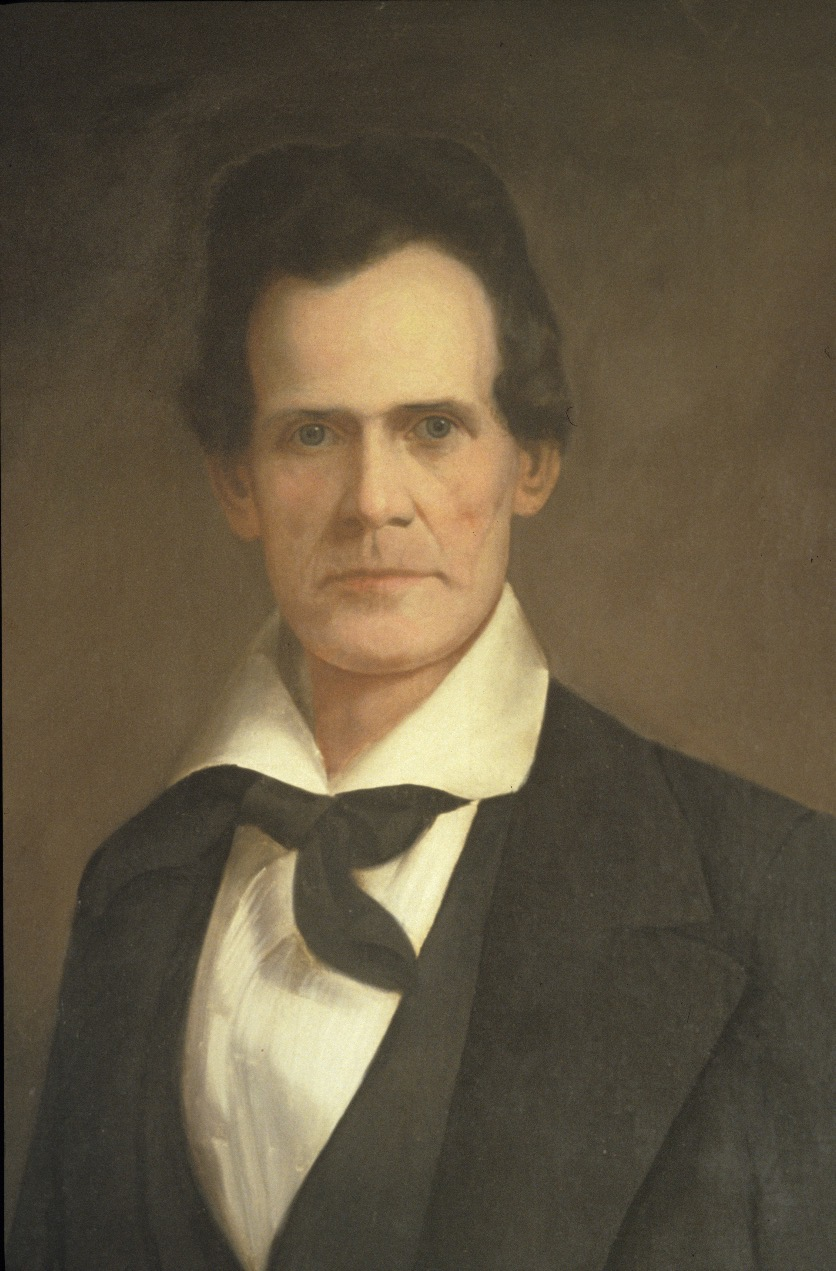
Nominee	William B. Campbell	William Trousdale
Party	Whig	Democratic
Popular vote	63,333	61,673
Percentage	50.66%	49.34%
- County results Campbell: 50–60% 60–70% 70–80% 80–90% Trousdale: 50–60% 60–70% 70–80% No Data/Vote
Governor before election
William Trousdale
Democratic
Elected Governor
William B. Campbell
Whig

The 1851 Tennessee gubernatorial election was held on August 7, 1851, to elect the Governor of Tennessee. Whig nominee and former member of the U.S. House of Representatives from Tennessee's 6th district William B. Campbell defeated Democratic nominee and incumbent Governor William Trousdale.

== General election ==
On election day, August 7, 1851, Whig nominee William B. Campbell won the election by a margin of 1,557 votes against his opponent Democratic nominee and incumbent Governor William Trousdale, thereby gaining Whig control over the office of Governor. Campbell was sworn in as the 14th Governor of Tennessee on October 16, 1851.

=== Results ===
Tennessee gubernatorial election, 1851
Party	Candidate	Votes	%
Whig	William B. Campbell	63,333	50.66
Democratic	William Trousdale (incumbent)	61,673	49.34
Total votes		125,006	100.00
Whig gain from Democratic			
