= 1845 Tennessee gubernatorial election =

- August 7, 1845
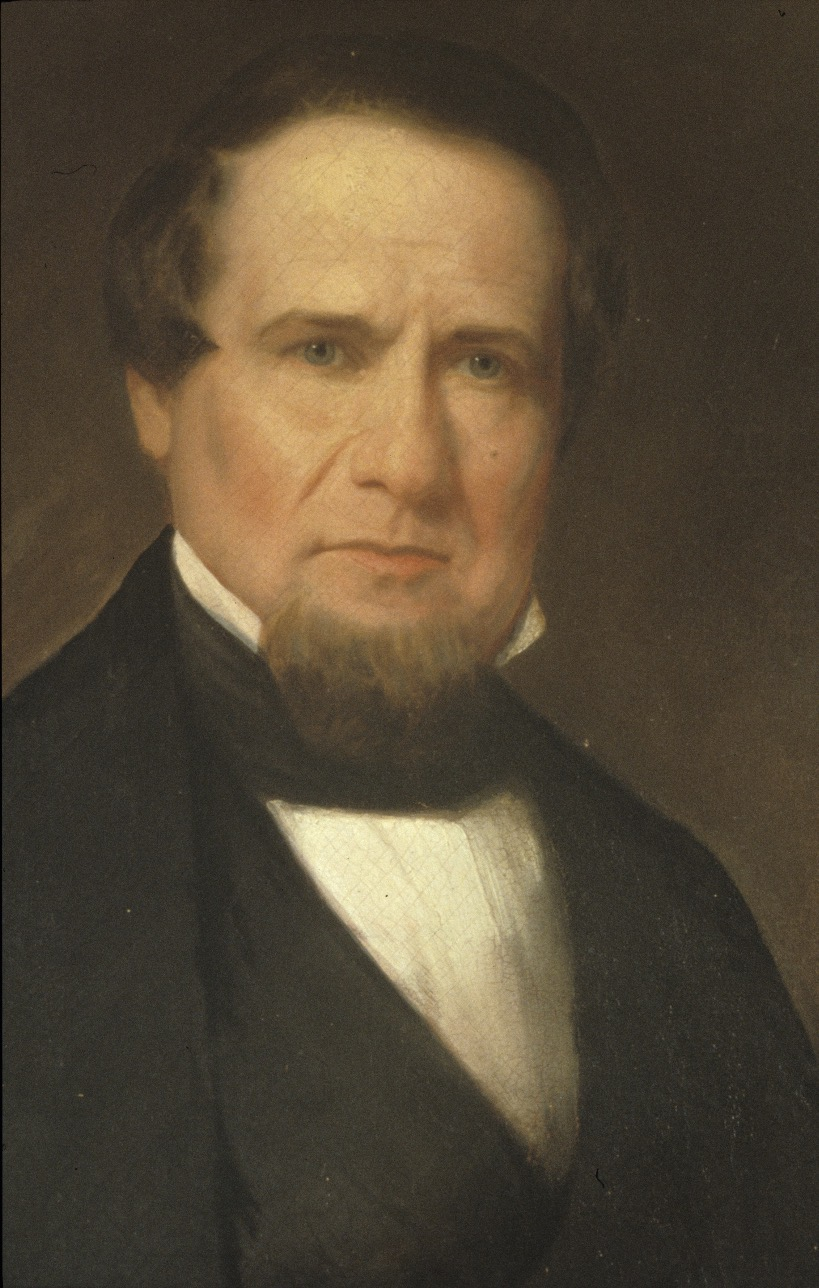

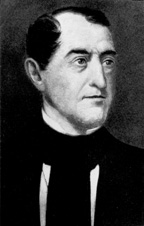
| Nominee | Aaron V. Brown | Ephraim H. Foster |
| Party | Democratic | Whig |
| Popular vote | 58,269 | 56,646 |
| Percentage | 50.71% | 49.29% |
- County results Brown: 50–60% 60–70% 70–80% 80–90% Foster: 50–60% 60–70% 70–80% 80–90% No Data/Vote
Governor before election
James C. Jones
Whig
Elected Governor
Aaron V. Brown
Democratic

The 1845 Tennessee gubernatorial election was held on August 7, 1845, to elect the Governor of Tennessee. Democratic nominee and former member of the U.S. House of Representatives from Tennessee's 6th district Aaron V. Brown defeated Whig nominee and former United States Senator from Tennessee Ephraim H. Foster.

Incumbent Whig Governor James C. Jones did not seek a third term, choosing instead to accept an offer to become president of the Memphis and Charleston Railroad.

== General election ==
On election day, August 7, 1845, Democratic nominee Aaron V. Brown won the election by a margin of 1,623 votes against his opponent Whig nominee Ephraim H. Foster, thereby gaining Democratic control over the office of Governor. Brown was sworn in as the 11th Governor of Tennessee on October 14, 1845.

=== Results ===
Tennessee gubernatorial election, 1845
| Party | Candidate | Votes | % |
|---|---|---|---|
| Democratic | Aaron V. Brown | 58,269 | 50.71 |
| Whig | Ephraim H. Foster | 56,646 | 49.29 |
| Total votes | | 114,915 | 100.00 |
| Democratic gain from Whig | | | |
