= 1813 Tennessee gubernatorial election =

Election for Tennessee Governor

- August 5–6, 1813
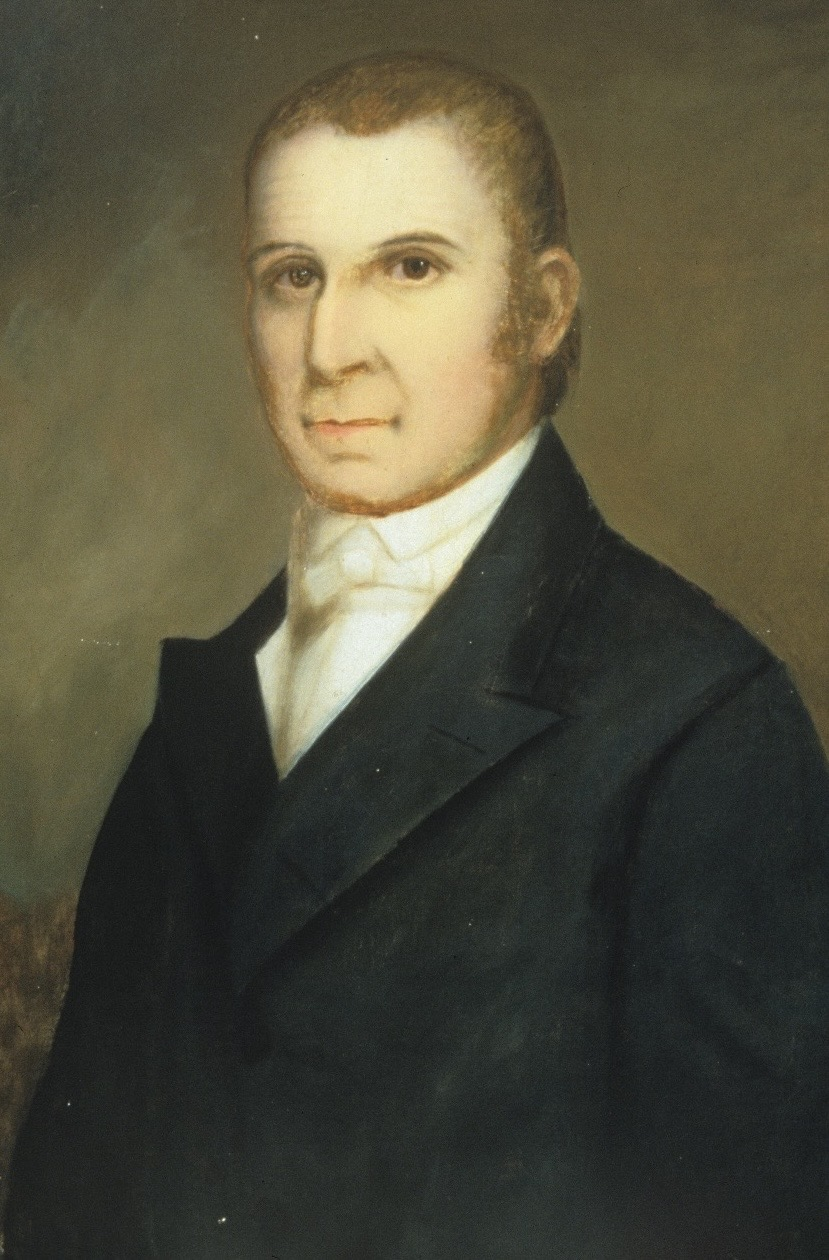
Nominee	Willie Blount
Party	Democratic-Republican
Popular vote	21,510
Percentage	99.79%
- County results Blount: 90–100% No Data/Vote
Governor before election
Willie Blount
Democratic-Republican
Elected Governor
Willie Blount
Democratic-Republican

The 1813 Tennessee gubernatorial election was held between August 5 and 6, 1813 in order to elect the Governor of Tennessee. Democratic-Republican nominee and incumbent Governor Willie Blount was re-elected nearly unanimously as he ran unopposed.

== General election ==
On election day, August 5, 1813, Democratic-Republican candidate Willie Blount won re-election nearly unanimously as he ran unopposed, thereby retaining Democratic-Republican control over the office of Governor. Blount was sworn in for his third term on September 20, 1813.

=== Results ===
Tennessee gubernatorial election, 1813
Party	Candidate	Votes	%
Democratic-Republican	Willie Blount (incumbent)	21,510	99.79
	Scattering	45	0.21
Total votes		21,555	100.00
Democratic-Republican hold			
