= 1797 Tennessee gubernatorial election =

- August 3–4, 1797
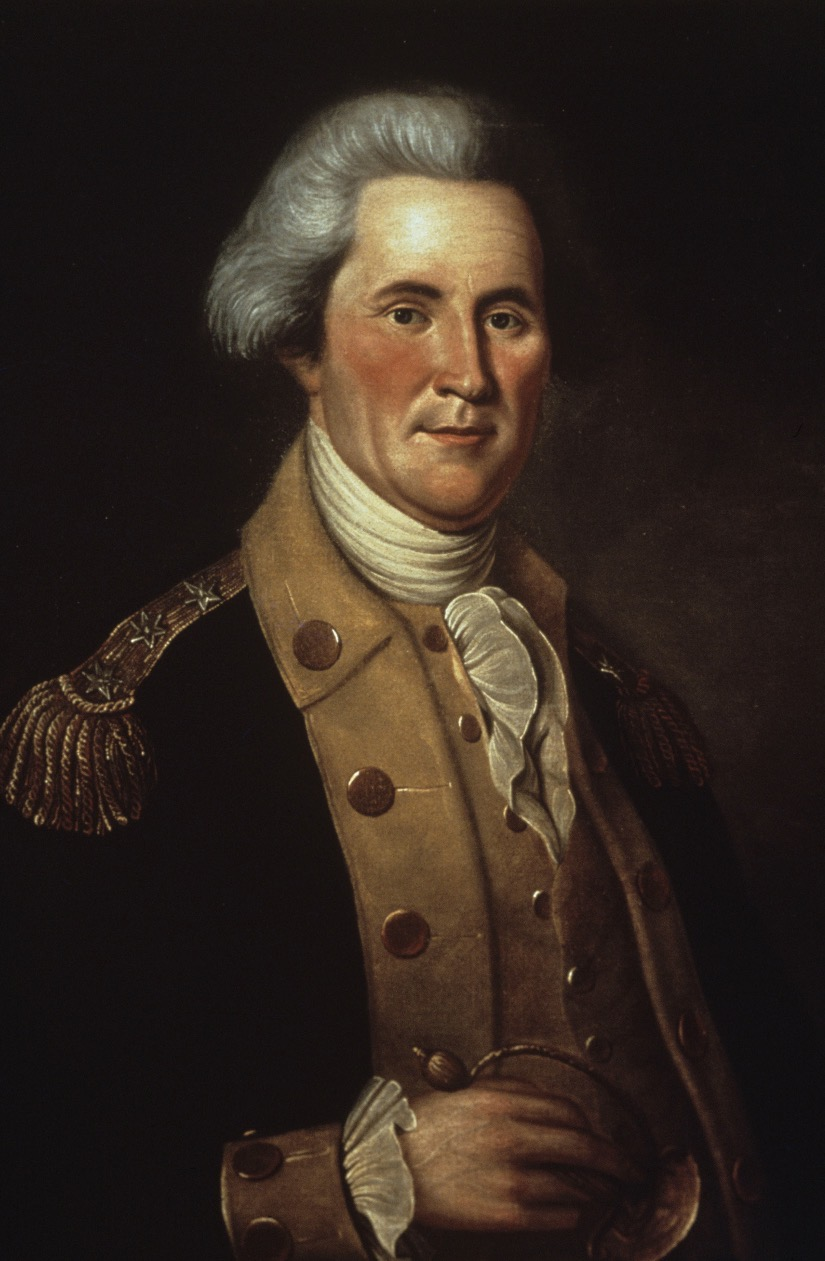
| Nominee | John Sevier |
| Party | Democratic-Republican |
Governor before election
John Sevier
Democratic-Republican
Elected Governor
John Sevier
Democratic-Republican

The 1797 Tennessee gubernatorial election was held between August 3 and 4, 1797 in order to elect the Governor of Tennessee. Democratic-Republican nominee and incumbent Governor John Sevier ran unopposed and thus won re-election, but the exact election results are unknown.

== General election ==
On election day, August 3, 1797, Democratic-Republican nominee John Sevier won re-election, but the exact results are unknown, thereby retaining Democratic-Republican control over the office of Governor. Sevier was sworn in for his second term on September 23, 1797.

=== Results ===
Tennessee gubernatorial election, 1797
| Party | Candidate | Votes | % |
|---|---|---|---|
| Democratic-Republican | John Sevier (incumbent) | | |
| Total votes | | | |
| Democratic-Republican hold | | | |
