= 1819 Tennessee gubernatorial election =

- August 5–6, 1819
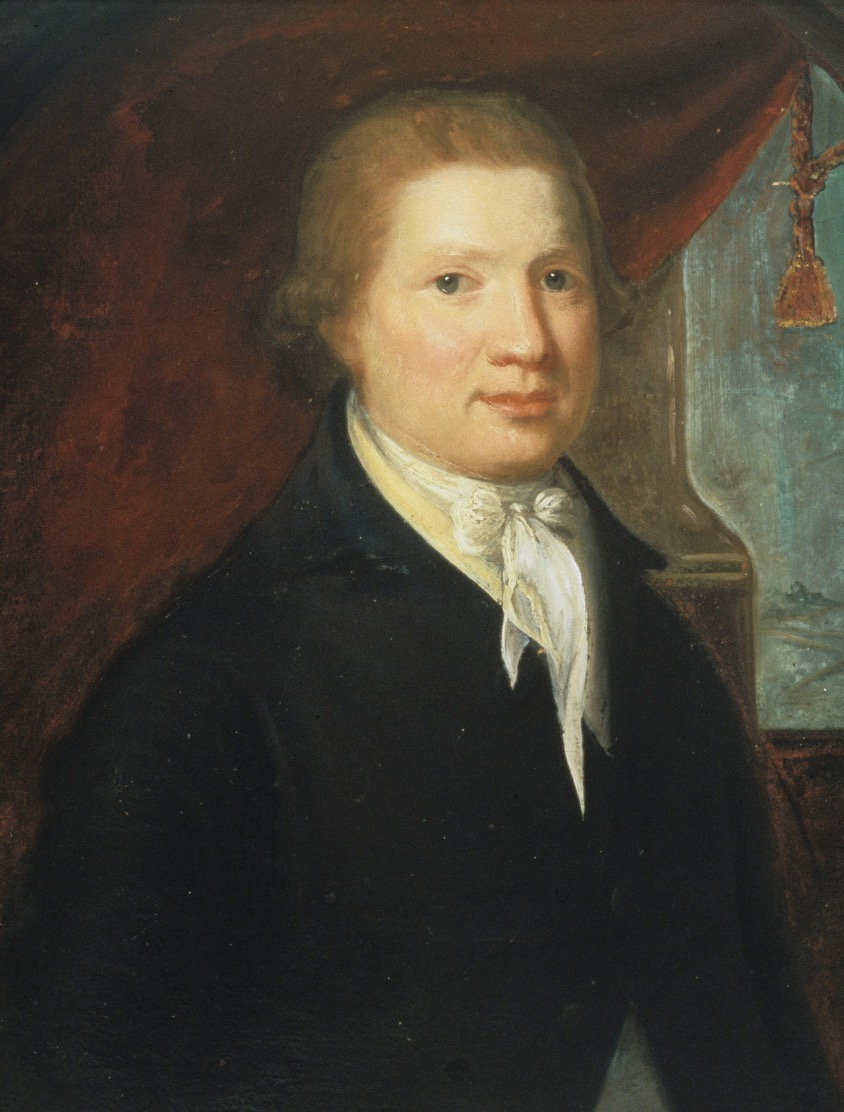

Nominee	Joseph McMinn	Enoch Parsons
Party	Democratic-Republican
Popular vote	36,470	9,148
Percentage	79.93%	20.05%
- County results McMinn: 50–60% 60–70% 70–80% 80–90% 90–100% Parsons: 50–60% 60–70% 70–80% No Data/Vote
Governor before election
Joseph McMinn
Democratic-Republican
Elected Governor
Joseph McMinn
Democratic-Republican

The 1819 Tennessee gubernatorial election was held between August 5 and 6, 1819 in order to elect the Governor of Tennessee. Democratic-Republican nominee and incumbent Governor Joseph McMinn won re-election against the President of Middletown branch of the Bank of America Enoch Parsons.

== General election ==
On election day, August 5, 1819, Democratic-Republican candidate Joseph McMinn won re-election by a margin of 27,322 votes against his opponent Enoch Parsons, thereby retaining Democratic-Republican control over the office of Governor. McMinn was sworn in for his third term on September 27, 1819.

=== Results ===
Tennessee gubernatorial election, 1819
Party	Candidate	Votes	%
Democratic-Republican	Joseph McMinn (incumbent)	36,470	79.93
	Enoch Parsons	9,148	20.05
	Scattering	7	0.02
Total votes		45,625	100.00
Democratic-Republican hold			
