= Trousdale Place =

Historic house in Tennessee, United States

- U.S. National Register of Historic Places
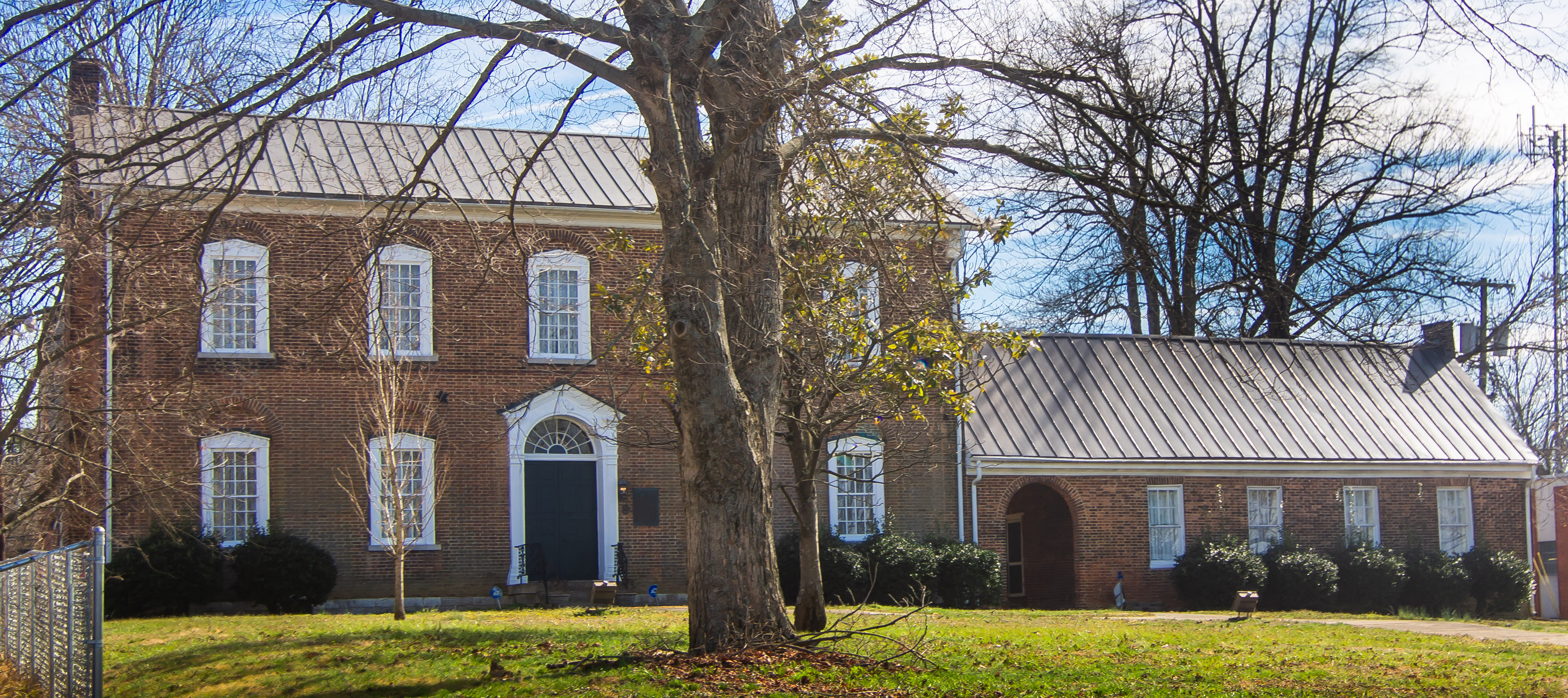

- Location within Tennessee Location within the United States
- Location: 183 W. Main St., Gallatin, Tennessee
- Coordinates: 36°23′14″N 86°26′56″W
- Area: 1.5 acres (0.61 ha)
- NRHP reference No.: 75001793
- Added to NRHP: June 5, 1975

Trousdale Place is a historic mansion in Gallatin, Sumner County, Tennessee. It was the home of John H. Bowen, local attorney and member of the United States House of Representatives, and of governor of Tennessee William Trousdale.

== Description ==
Trousdale Place is a two-story Federal-style brick structure with staggered Flemish-bond brickwork.

== History ==
John Bowen built the house circa 1813. Bowen died in 1822. The site of the house had been part of a North Carolina land grant in lieu of payment to James Trousdale, a veteran of the Revolutionary War. He sold this portion for the platting of the town of Gallatin.

His son William Trousdale purchased the house in 1836 and later was elected as Governor of Tennessee. The house was Trousdale's principal residence until his death there in 1872. His widow lived there until her death in the following decade, when the house was passed to their son, Julius Trousdale.

After the 1899 deaths of Julius and his only living child, Julius' widow, Annie Berry Trousdale, deeded the home to a local chapter of the United Daughters of the Confederacy. Since then, the house has been known as Trousdale Place. A Confederate monument was installed on the front lawn in 1903.

The property was listed on the National Register of Historic Places in 1975. In the 1970s, the Sumner County Museum was started as a small collection displayed inside Trousdale Place. By 1979, the museum was ready to build its own facility and was given permission to build on the grounds of Trousdale Place.

Today the house shares its grounds with the Sumner County Museum and is open to the public for tours by appointment. The interior of the house is furnished with original Trousdale furniture. It also contains a small library focused on the Confederacy.
