= 1853 Tennessee gubernatorial election =

- August 4, 1853
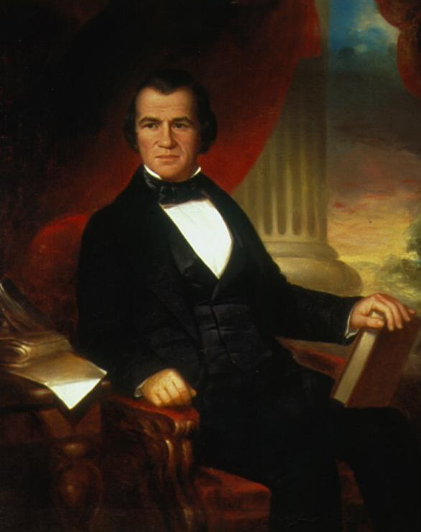

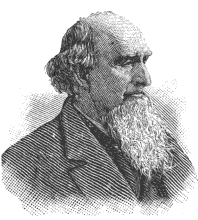
Nominee	Andrew Johnson	Gustavus Adolphus Henry Sr.
Party	Democratic	Whig
Popular vote	63,413	61,163
Percentage	50.90%	49.10%
- County results Johnson: 50–60% 60–70% 70–80% 80–90% Henry: 50–60% 60–70% 70–80% 80–90%
Governor before election
William B. Campbell
Whig
Elected Governor
Andrew Johnson
Democratic

The 1853 Tennessee gubernatorial election was held on August 4, 1853, to elect the Governor of Tennessee. Democratic nominee and former member of the U.S. House of Representatives from Tennessee's 1st district Andrew Johnson defeated Whig nominee Gustavus Adolphus Henry Sr.

== General election ==
On election day, August 4, 1853, Democratic nominee Andrew Johnson won the election by a margin of 2,252 votes against his Whig opponent Gustavus Adolphus Henry Sr., thereby gaining Democratic control over the office of Governor. Johnson was sworn in as the 15th Governor of Tennessee on October 17, 1853.

=== Results ===
Tennessee gubernatorial election, 1853
Party	Candidate	Votes	%
Democratic	Andrew Johnson	63,413	50.90%
Whig	Gustavus Adolphus Henry Sr.	61,163	49.10%
Total votes		124,576	100.00%
Democratic gain from Whig			
