= 1829 Tennessee gubernatorial election =

- August 6–7, 1829
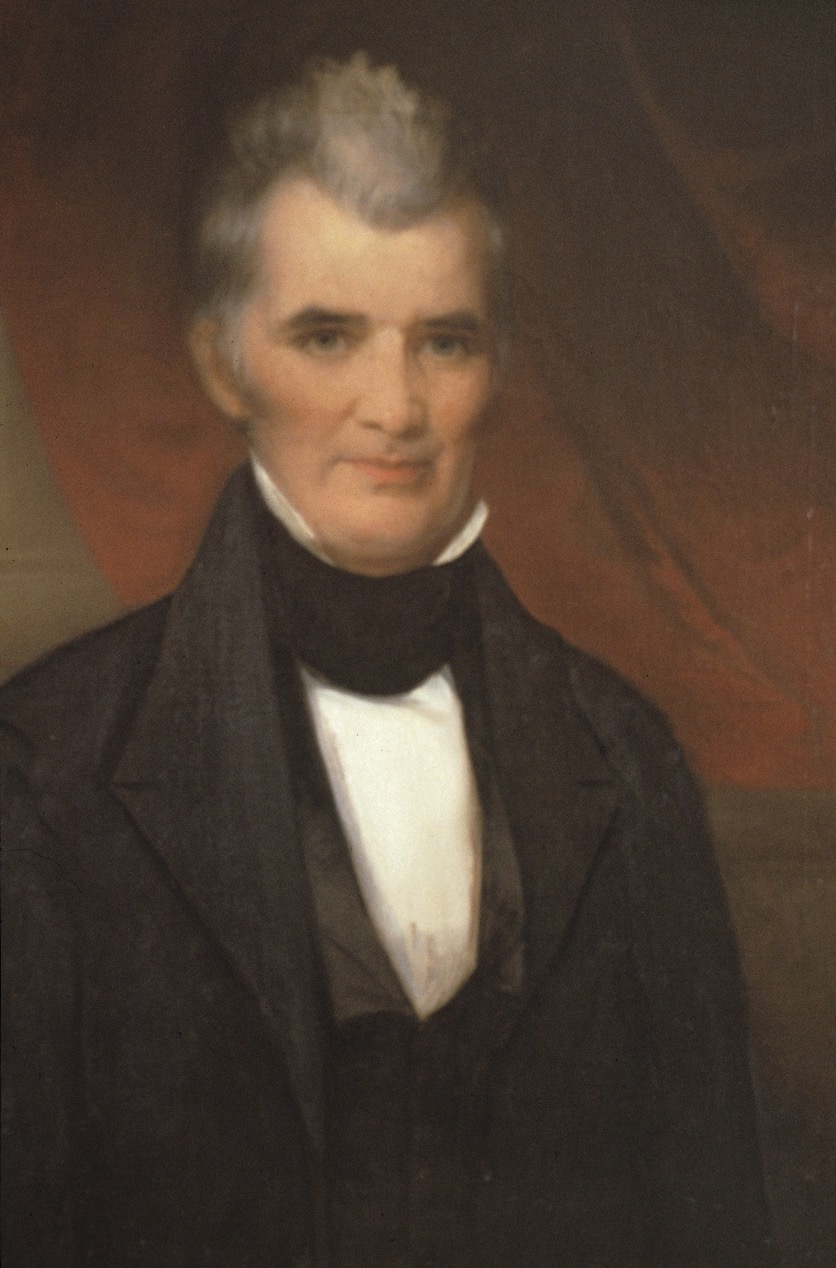
Nominee	William Carroll
Party	Jacksonian
Popular vote	59,917
Percentage	99.82%
- County results Carroll: >90% Unknown/No votes
Governor before election
William Hall
Democratic-Republican
Elected Governor
William Carroll
Jacksonian

The 1829 Tennessee gubernatorial election was held between August 6 and 7, 1829 in order to elect the Governor of Tennessee. On April 16, 1829, Governor Sam Houston following the collapse of his marriage, resigned as governor of Tennessee. William Hall, as Speaker of the Senate, was the first in the line of succession and thus became governor on April 16 but did not seek a full term. Jacksonian nominee and former Governor William Carroll easily won the election to a third term as he ran unopposed.

== General election ==
On election day, August 6, 1829, Democratic candidate William Carroll won the election by a margin of 59,811 votes against a handful of scattering votes, thereby gaining Democratic control over the office of Governor. Carroll was sworn in for his fourth overall term on October 1, 1829.

=== Results ===
Tennessee gubernatorial election, 1829
Party	Candidate	Votes	%
Democratic	William Carroll	59,917	99.82%
	Scattering	106	0.18%
Total votes		34,308	100.00%
Democratic gain from Democratic-Republican			

== Sources ==
- Haley, James L. (2002). Sam Houston. Norman, OK: University of Oklahoma Press. ISBN 978-0-8061-3644-8.
