= 1796 Tennessee gubernatorial election =

- March 1–2, 1796
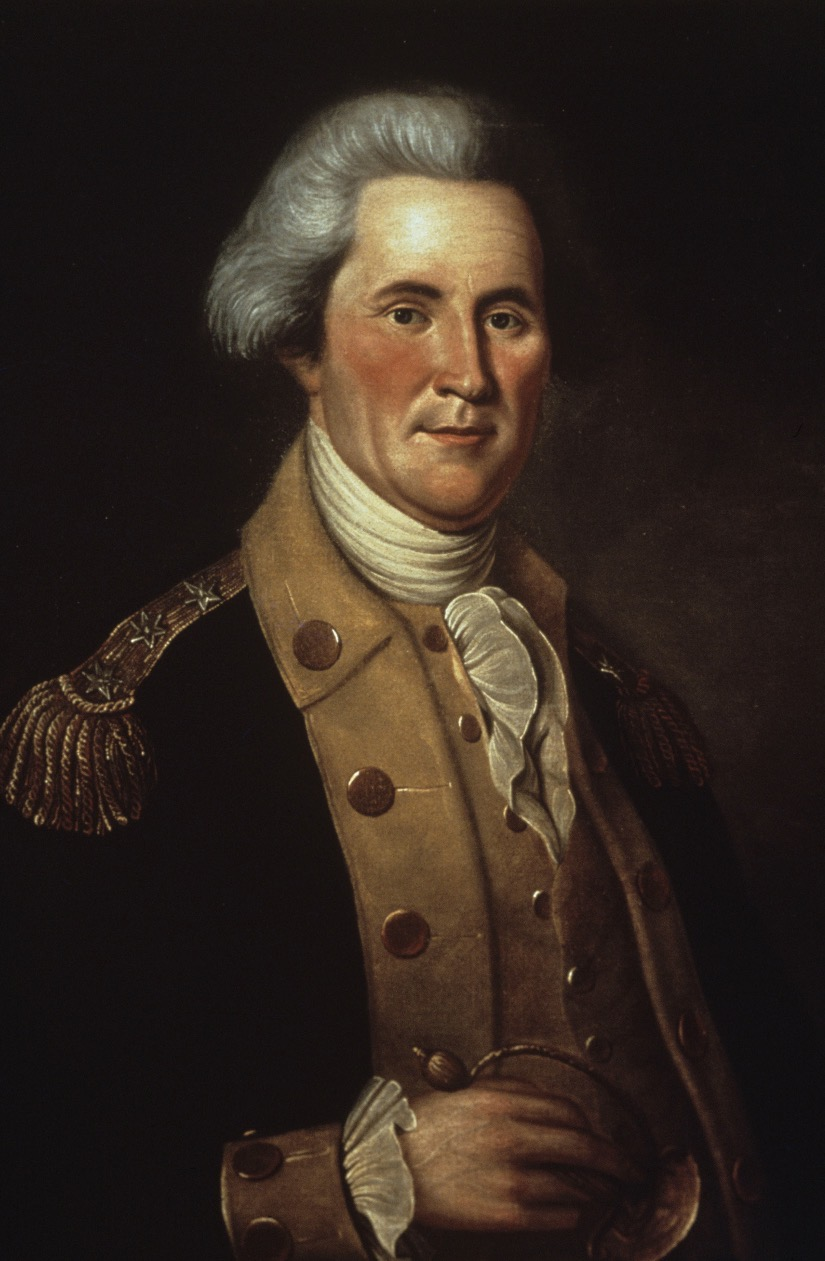
Nominee	John Sevier
Party	Democratic-Republican
Governor before election
Position Established
Elected Governor
John Sevier
Democratic-Republican

The 1796 Tennessee gubernatorial election was held between March 1 and 2, 1796 in order to elect the first governor of Tennessee. Democratic-Republican nominee and former member of the U.S. House of Representatives from North Carolina's 5th district John Sevier ran unopposed and thus won the election, but the exact election results are unknown.

This was the first gubernatorial election that Tennessee had participated in since being admitted to the Union on June 1, 1796, as the 16th state.

== General election ==
On election day, March 1, 1796, Democratic-Republican nominee John Sevier won the election, but the exact results are unknown, thereby gaining Democratic-Republican control over the new office of Governor. Sevier was sworn in as the 1st Governor of Tennessee on March 30, 1796.

=== Results ===
Tennessee gubernatorial election, 1796
Party	Candidate	Votes	%
Democratic-Republican	John Sevier		
Total votes			
Democratic-Republican win (new seat)			

== See also ==
- 1796 United States presidential election in Tennessee
