= 1855 Tennessee gubernatorial election =

- August 2, 1855
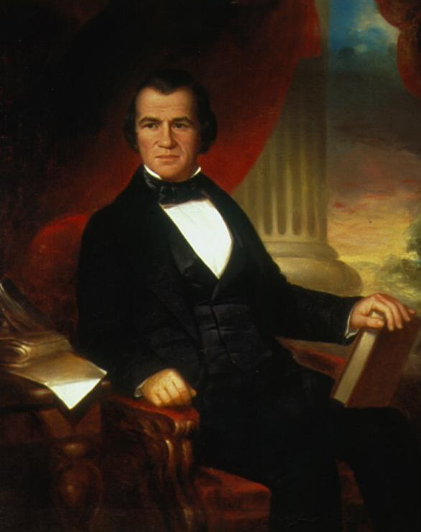

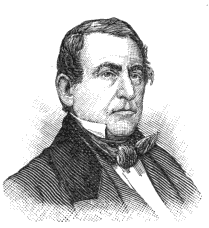
Nominee	Andrew Johnson	Meredith Poindexter Gentry
Party	Democratic	Whig
Popular vote	67,499	65,343
Percentage	50.81%	49.19%
- County results Johnson: 50–60% 60–70% 70–80% 80–90% 90–100% Gentry: 50–60% 60–70% 70–80% 80–90% No Data/Vote
Governor before election
Andrew Johnson
Democratic
Elected Governor
Andrew Johnson
Democratic

The 1855 Tennessee gubernatorial election was held on August 2, 1855, to elect the governor of Tennessee. Incumbent Democratic governor Andrew Johnson was re-elected against Whig nominee and former member of the U.S. House of Representatives from Tennessee's 7th district Meredith Poindexter Gentry.

== General election ==
On election day, August 2, 1855, incumbent Democratic governor Andrew Johnson won re-election by a margin of 2,157 votes against his Whig opponent Meredith Poindexter Gentry, thereby retaining Democratic control over the office of governor. Johnson was sworn in for his second term on October 17, 1855.

=== Results ===
Tennessee gubernatorial election, 1855
Party	Candidate	Votes	%
Democratic	Andrew Johnson (incumbent)	67,499	50.81
Whig	Meredith Poindexter Gentry	65,343	49.19
Total votes		132,842	100.00
Democratic hold			
