= 1857 Tennessee gubernatorial election =

- August 6, 1857
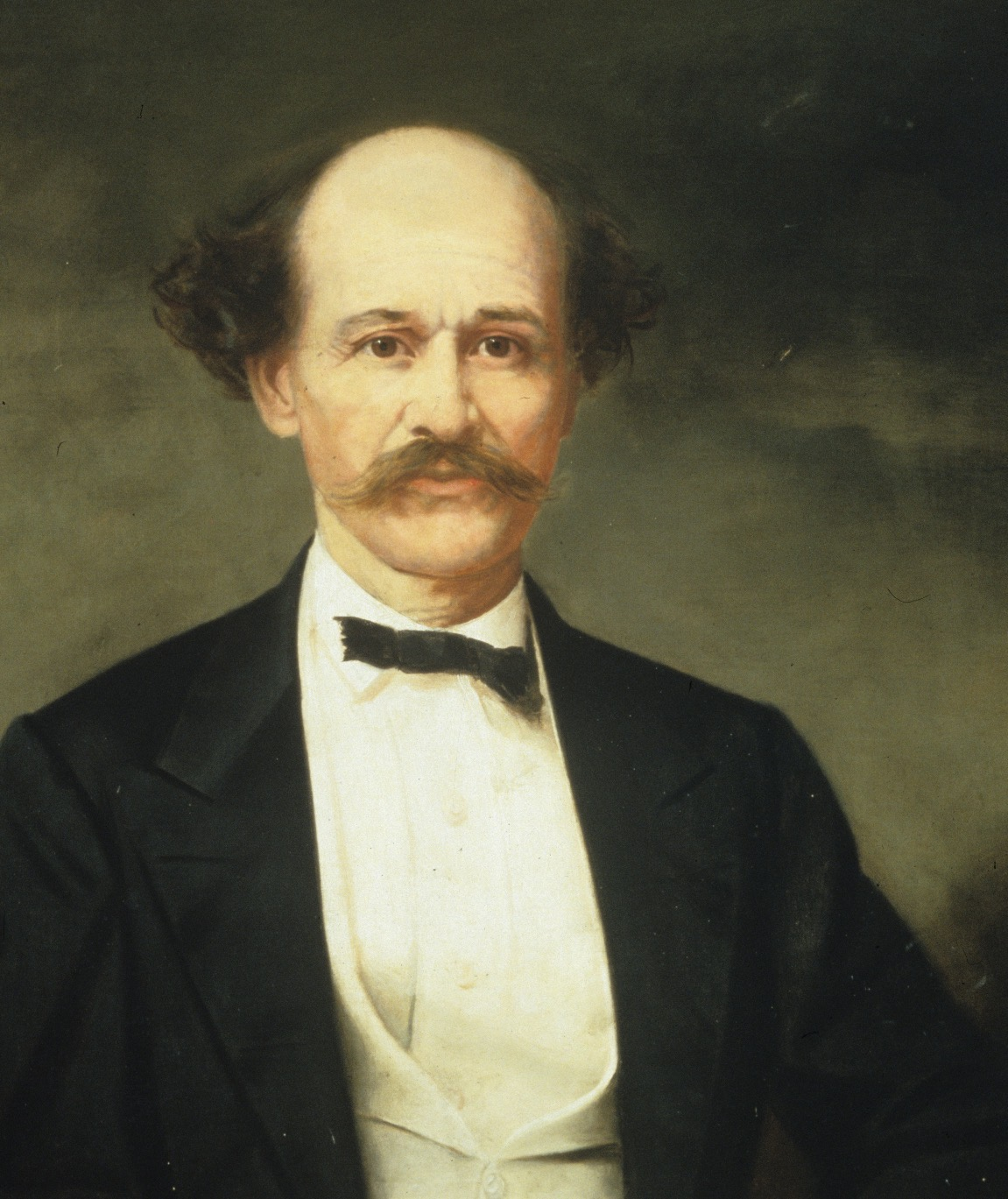

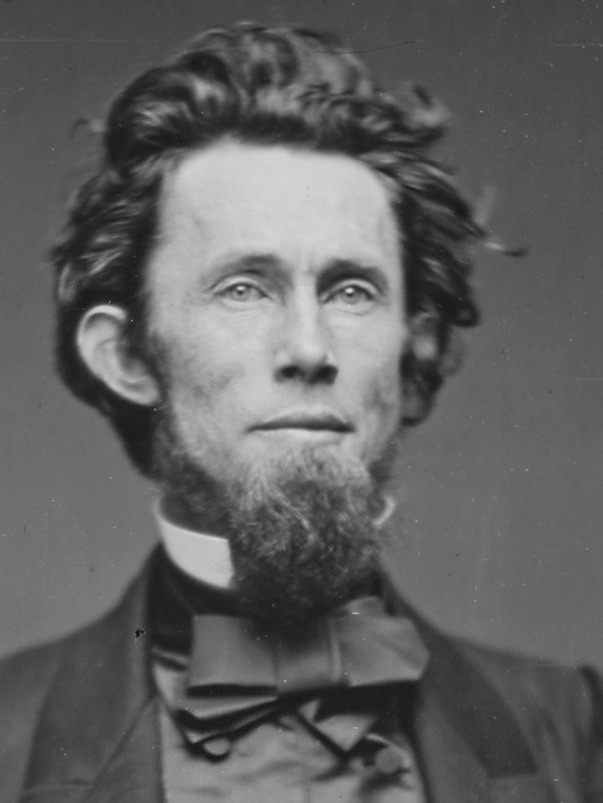
Nominee	Isham G. Harris	Robert H. Hatton
Party	Democratic	Know Nothing
Popular vote	71,178	59,807
Percentage	54.34%	45.66%
- County results Harris: 50–60% 60–70% 70–80% 80–90% >90% Hatton: 50–60% 60–70% 70–80% No data/No votes
Governor before election
Andrew Johnson
Democratic
Elected Governor
Isham G. Harris
Democratic

The 1857 Tennessee gubernatorial election was held on August 6, 1857, to elect the next governor of Tennessee. Incumbent Democratic governor Andrew Johnson, was seriously injured in a train accident and was unable to run for re-election. Democrat Isham G. Harris was nominated as his replacement. In the general election, Harris ran for a full term and defeated Know Nothing candidate Robert H. Hatton with 54.34% of the vote.

Harris's 11,000 vote victory was relatively large, considering his predecessor, Johnson, had won by just over 2,000 votes in both 1853 and 1855.

== Aftermath ==
Harris's victory was not only the death knell for the state's Know Nothings, who had briefly risen to prominence following the collapse of the national Whig Party, but also represented a shift in Tennessee politics toward the Democratic Party. During the previous two decades, Whigs and Democrats had been evenly matched statewide, with Whigs controlling East Tennessee, Democrats controlling Middle Tennessee, and the two parties evenly split in West Tennessee. The nationwide debate over the Kansas–Nebraska Act and the Dred Scott case pushed the issue of slavery to the forefront in the mid-1850s, and the balance in West Tennessee was tipped in favor of the Democrats.

== General election ==
1857 Tennessee gubernatorial election
Party	Candidate	Votes	%	±%
Democratic	Isham G. Harris	71,178	54.34	
Know Nothing	Robert H. Hatton	59,807	45.66	
Total votes		130,985	100.00	
