= 1863 Tennessee gubernatorial election =

1863 Tennessee gubernatorial election (Confederate)
- August 6, 1863
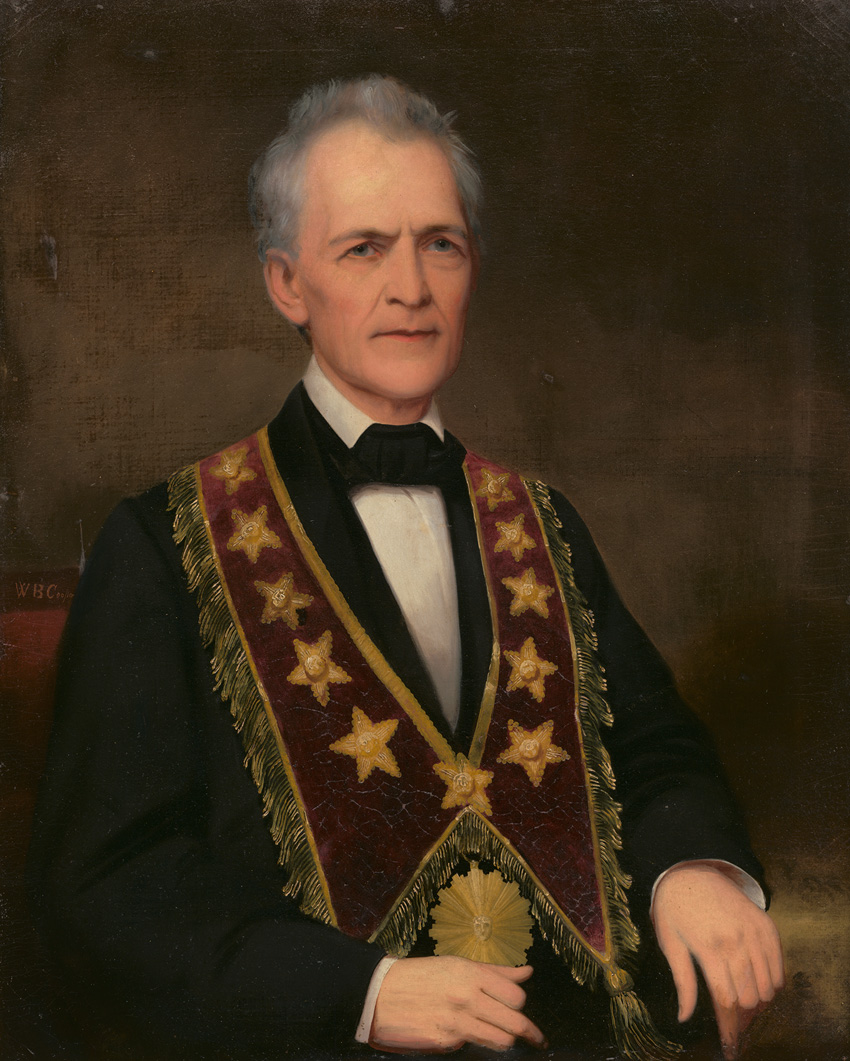

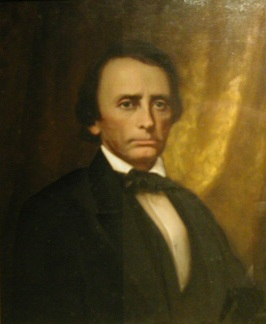
Nominee	Robert L. Caruthers	Parson Brownlow
Party	Nonpartisan	Nonpartisan
Popular vote	7,053	112
Percentage	98.44%	1.56%
- County results Harris: 60–70% 80–90% >90% No votes
Governor before election
Isham G. Harris
Democratic
Elected Governor
Robert L. Caruthers
Nonpartisan

The 1863 Tennessee gubernatorial election was held on August 6, 1863, to elect the next governor of Tennessee. Incumbent Democratic governor Isham G. Harris was prohibited by the state constitution from seeking a fourth consecutive term. On July 17, 1863, the state's Confederate leaders met in Winchester, Tennessee, and nominated Democrat Robert L. Caruthers for governor. 30 counties, mainly those still under Confederate control, participated in the election. Caruthers won effectively unopposed, with only two of the 30 counties recording votes for Unionist Parson Brownlow.

The state constitution required that the governor-elect take the oath of office before the General Assembly. Since the Union Army controlled most of Middle and West Tennessee at this time, the Assembly was unable to convene, and Caruthers never officially took office. Confederates continued to recognize Harris as governor until the end of the war. Union forces, in the meantime, had installed Andrew Johnson as military governor.

== Background ==
In 1852, Caruthers was appointed by Governor William B. Campbell to fill the term of Nathan Green (who had retired) as Middle Tennessee's justice of the Tennessee Supreme Court. The following year, the state legislature voted to give Caruthers a full term. In 1854, after the state constitution was amended to allow popular election of justices, Caruthers managed to win re-election to the court.

Prior to the outbreak of the Civil War, Caruthers was a delegate to the Washington Peace Convention in February 1861, which sought to find a peaceful resolution to the sectional strife between the North and South. He remained pro-Union until the Battle of Fort Sumter in April 1861, after which he aligned himself with the Confederacy. In August 1861, he resigned from the court to represent Tennessee in the Provisional Confederate Congress.

== General election ==
1863 Tennessee gubernatorial election (Confederate)
Party	Candidate	Votes	%	±%
Nonpartisan	Robert L. Caruthers	7,053	98.44	
Nonpartisan	Parson Brownlow	112	1.56	
Total votes		7,165	100.00	

== See also ==
- Tennessee in the American Civil War
- Provisional Army of Tennessee
- Confederate States of America
