= 1799 Tennessee gubernatorial election =

- August 1–2, 1799
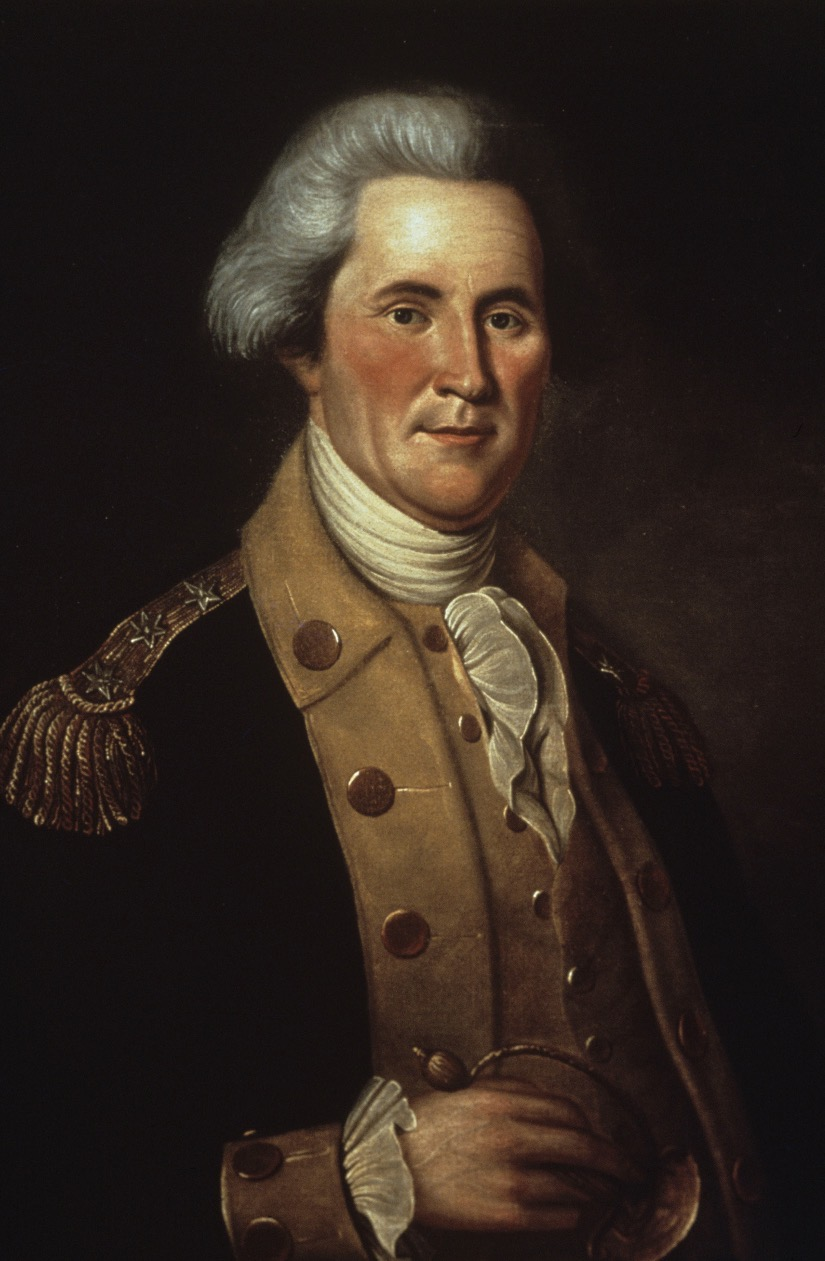
Nominee	John Sevier
Party	Democratic-Republican
Popular vote	6,404
Percentage	99.74%
- County results Sevier: >90% No votes
Governor before election
John Sevier
Democratic-Republican
Elected Governor
John Sevier
Democratic-Republican

The 1799 Tennessee gubernatorial election took place from August 1–2, 1799. Incumbent Democratic-Republican governor John Sevier was re-elected to a third term almost unanimously with 99.74% of the vote, against two opponents.

For the counties that had votes, Sevier nearly won every county with 100% of the vote except Hawkins County, where he won with 92.7% of the vote.

== Results ==
Tennessee gubernatorial election, 1799
Party	Candidate	Votes	%
Democratic-Republican	John Sevier (incumbent)	6,404	99.74%
Democratic-Republican	George Conway	12	0.19%
Democratic-Republican	Joseph Anderson	5	0.07%
Total votes		6,421	100.00%

== See also ==
- 1799 United States gubernatorial elections
