= William Trousdale =

American soldier and politician (1790 – 1872)

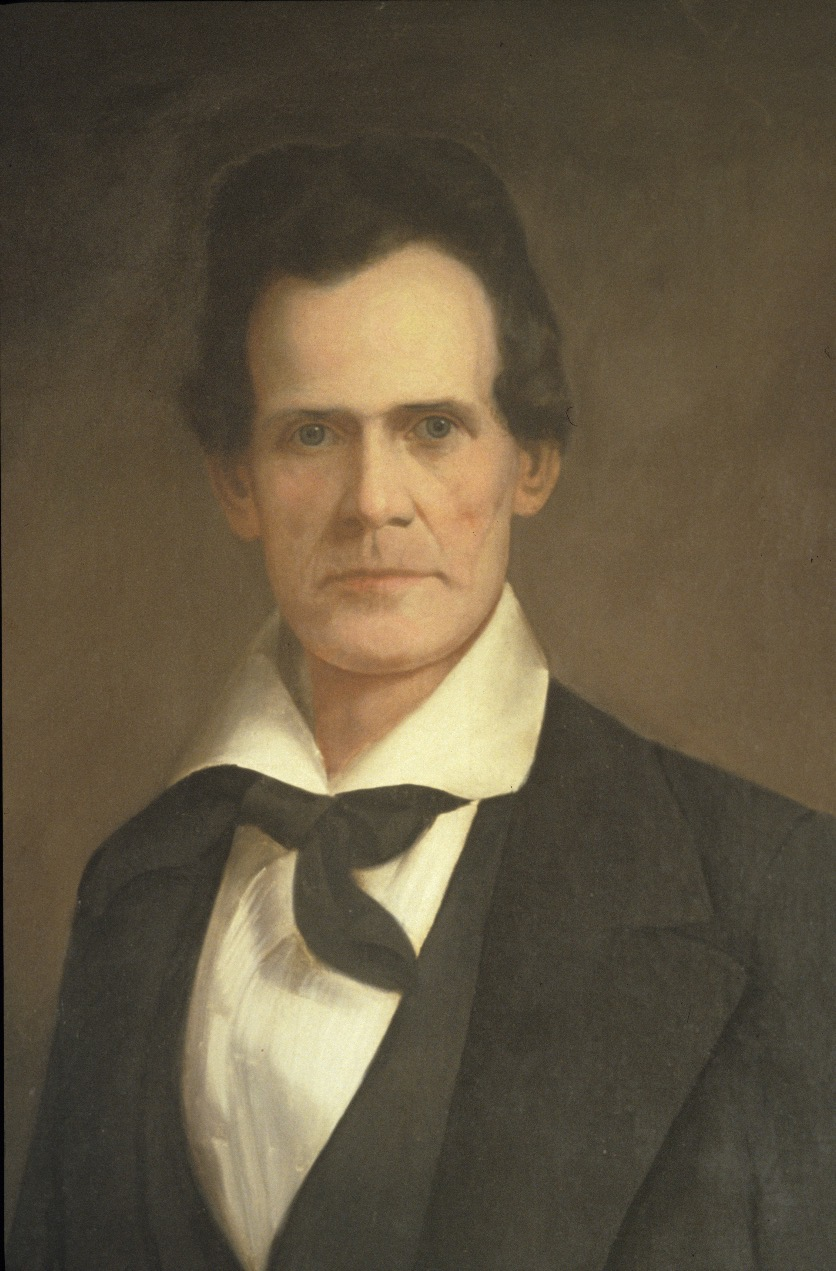

13th Governor of Tennessee
- In office October 16, 1849 – October 16, 1851
- Preceded by: Neill S. Brown
- Succeeded by: William B. Campbell

United States Minister to Brazil
- In office October 8, 1853 – December 5, 1857
- President: Franklin Pierce; James Buchanan
- Preceded by: Robert C. Schenck
- Succeeded by: Richard K. Meade

Personal details
- Born: September 23, 1790 Orange County, North Carolina, United States
- Died: March 27, 1872 (aged 81) Gallatin, Tennessee, United States
- Resting place: Gallatin City Cemetery
- Party: Democratic
- Spouse: Mary Ann Bugg (m. 1827)
- Relations: John Stockard (cousin)
- Children: 7
- Profession: Attorney

Military service
- Branch/service: Tennessee militia United States Army
- Years of service: 1812–1813, 1814–1815, 1836–1837, 1847–1848
- Rank: Colonel; Bvt. Brigadier General
- Commands: 2nd Tennessee Mounted Volunteers; 14th U.S. Infantry
- Battles/wars: Creek War; Battle of Tallushatchee; Battle of Talladega; War of 1812; Battle of Pensacola; Battle of New Orleans; Second Seminole War; Battle of Wahoo Swamp; Mexican-American War; Battle of Contreras; Battle of Churubusco; Battle of Molino del Rey; Battle of Chapultepec

William Trousdale (September 23, 1790 – March 27, 1872) was an American soldier and politician. He served as the 13th governor of Tennessee from 1849 to 1851, and was United States Minister to Brazil from 1853 to 1857. He fought under Andrew Jackson in the Creek War, the War of 1812 and the Second Seminole War, and commanded the U.S. Fourteenth Infantry in the Mexican–American War. His military exploits earned him the nickname, "War Horse of Sumner County."

== Early life ==
Trousdale was born in Orange County, North Carolina, the son of James and Elizabeth (Dobbins) Trousdale. His father was of Scots-Irish descent, and had served in the Continental Army during the American Revolution. Captain James Trousdale was given a land grant as payment for services in the Revolution, and used this grant to acquire several hundred acres in Sumner County, Tennessee. The family moved to this plot in 1796. In 1801, the family donated part of their land for the establishment of a new county seat for Sumner County, which was named Gallatin. Trousdale attended public schools and studied under a tutor, the Reverend Gideon Blackburn.

== Military service and early political endeavors ==
Trousdale joined Captain William Edwards's Mounted Riflemen in 1812. When this company was called into service during the Creek War the following year, Trousdale was elected Lieutenant. The company saw action at the Battle of Tallushatchee and the Battle of Talladega before returning home.

In the Summer of 1814, after Trousdale had been at home for just a few months, he joined a militia company formed by Lieutenant-Colonel George Elliott. This company joined Jackson's invasion of Florida later that year. At the Battle of Pensacola in November 1814, Trousdale took part in a charge that captured several cannons on the first day of fighting. He volunteered to be among the first wave of soldiers to assault Fort San Miguel, but the fort surrendered before the assault took place.

Following the capture of Pensacola, Trousdale's unit hurried westward with Jackson's forces to defend New Orleans from an impending British invasion. They arrived in the city in December 1814, and Trousdale took part in a series of firefights and night skirmishes against the British on December 23, December 27, and January 1. He fought in the decisive Battle of New Orleans on January 8, 1815.

After the war, Trousdale returned home and studied law. He was admitted to the bar in 1820, and commenced practice in Sumner County. He ran unsuccessfully for Congress in 1827 and 1829, and served on Gallatin's Board of Aldermen from 1831 to 1835. He was elected to the Tennessee Senate in 1835, and served until the following year.

At the outbreak of the Second Seminole War in 1836, Trousdale formed his own company and was elected colonel of the Second Regiment, First Brigade. His regiment took part in several skirmishes and helped defeat Seminole forces at the Battle of Wahoo Swamp in November 1836.

In 1837, Trousdale once again ran for Congress for the 6th District congressional seat, but lost to William B. Campbell, his former subordinate in the Seminole War and his future gubernatorial opponent. He ran again in 1839 and 1845, but being a Democrat in a primarily Whig district, he was never successful. Trousdale campaigned for the unsuccessful Democratic presidential candidate, Martin Van Buren, in 1840.

During the Mexican–American War, Trousdale joined the Army with the rank of Colonel and commanded the 14th U.S. Infantry. This regiment landed at Veracruz on June 13, 1847, and was placed under General Gideon Pillow's 3rd Division. Trousdale's forces linked up with Winfield Scott's forces on July 8 and began the march inland to Mexico City. Trousdale took part in the Battle of Contreras and the Battle of Churubusco on August 20, and was grazed in the shoulder while fighting in the Battle of Molino del Rey on September 8. Trousdale commanded two regiments (the 14th and 11th) and an artillery battery at the Battle of Chapultepec on September 13. During this battle, his right arm was shattered by enemy fire, though he continued fighting, and managed to lead a charge that captured an enemy cannon. For his actions at Chapultepec, Trousdale was brevetted to brigadier general by President James K. Polk on August 23, 1848.

== Governor and later political endeavors ==
In 1849, Trousdale received the Democratic nomination for governor. His Whig opponent, Neill S. Brown, had been opposed to the Mexican–American War, and was struggling with divisions over the issue of slavery in the national Whig Party. Trousdale, on the other hand, was riding a wave of popularity for his service in the war. As a result, Trousdale edged Brown by 1,400 votes in the general election.

In Trousdale's reelection campaign in 1851, his opponent was William B. Campbell, a fellow Mexican–American War hero who had served under Trousdale in the Second Seminole War, and had defeated Trousdale for the 6th District congressional seat in 1837 and 1839. Like Brown in 1849, Trousdale's campaign was damaged by the actions of his own party. At the Nashville Convention in 1850, which Trousdale had endorsed, southern Democrats called for secession should the United States implement the Wilmot Proviso, banning slavery in territory acquired as a result of the Mexican–American War. Secession was unpopular in Tennessee at the time, and following a relatively dignified campaign, Campbell defeated Trousdale by 1,500 votes.

In 1853, Trousdale was appointed "Envoy Extraordinary and Minister Plenipotentiary" to Brazil by President Franklin Pierce. He arrived in Rio de Janeiro in July 1853 and served until 1857. He spent much of his term advocating the opening of the Amazon River to international commerce.

After returning to Sumner County, Trousdale spent the remainder of his life practicing law. He was consistently stricken with rheumatism, creating physical difficulties that prevented him from taking part in public life, as well as from serving in the Civil War in the 1860s. He nevertheless supported the Confederacy, and refused to take the Oath of Allegiance to the United States, even when Union soldiers occupied his home.

== Family ==
Trousdale was married to Mary Ann Bugg in 1827. The couple had seven children. His cousin was North Carolina state politician John Stockard.

== Death ==
Trousdale died on March 27, 1872, and is interred at Gallatin City Cemetery in Gallatin, Tennessee.

== Legacy ==
Trousdale County, Tennessee is named in his honor. His family home, the Federal-style "Trousdale Place" located near the town square of Gallatin, has been a preserved historical site since 1900.

== See also ==
- List of governors of Tennessee

Party political offices
Preceded by Aaron V. Brown	Democratic nominee for Governor of Tennessee; 1849, 1851	Succeeded by Andrew Johnson
Political offices
Preceded by Neill S. Brown	Governor of Tennessee; 1849–1851	Succeeded by William B. Campbell
Diplomatic posts
Preceded by Robert C. Schenck	United States Minister to Brazil; 8 October 1853 – 5 December 1857	Succeeded by Richard K. Meade
