= 1807 Tennessee gubernatorial election =

Tennessee gubernatorial election of 1807
- August 6–7, 1807
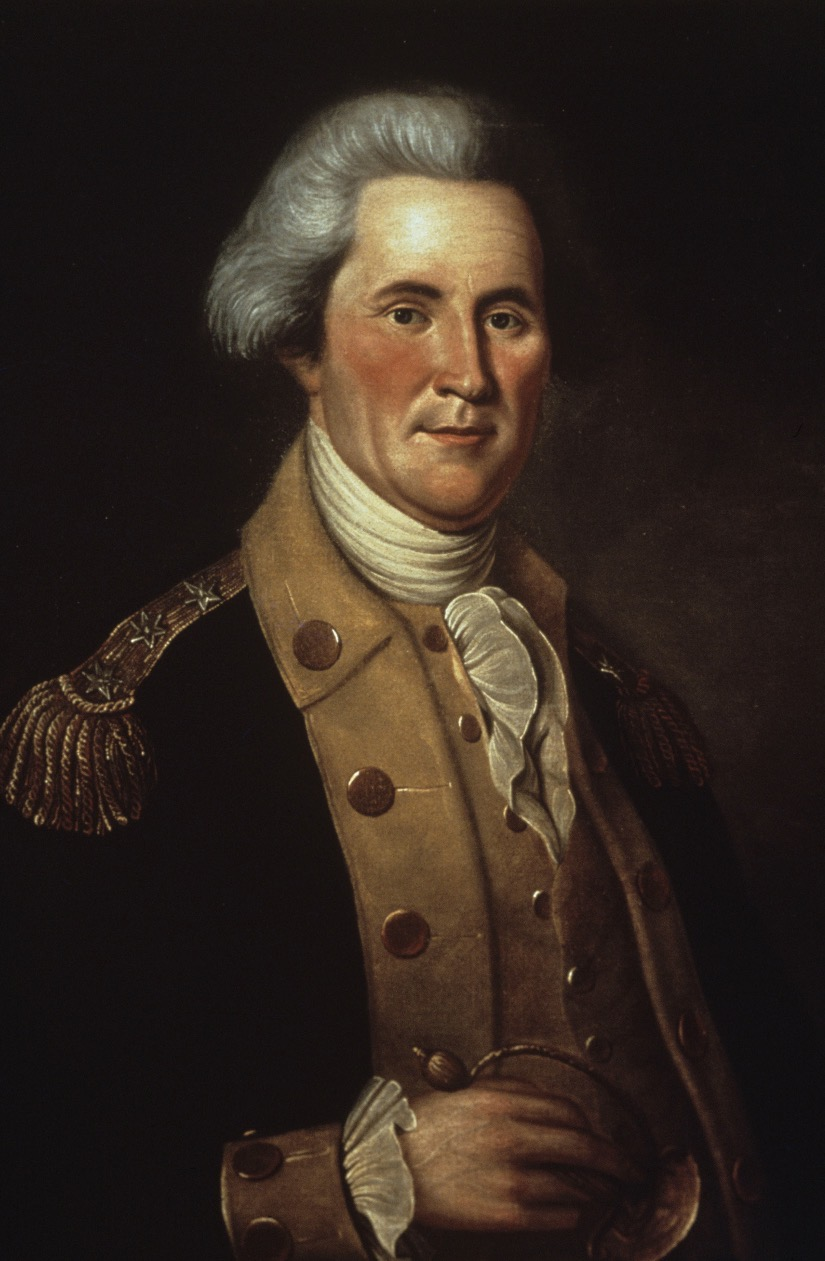

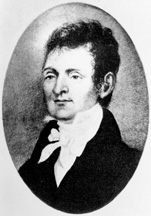
Nominee	John Sevier	William Cocke
Party	Democratic-Republican	Democratic-Republican
Popular vote	18,310	3,030
Percentage	63.74%	36.26%
Governor before election
John Sevier
Democratic-Republican
Elected Governor
John Sevier
Democratic-Republican

The 1807 Tennessee gubernatorial election took place from August 6–7, 1807. Incumbent governor John Sevier won his final term as governor of Tennessee, defeating Senator William Cocke with 85.80% of the vote.

== Results ==
Tennessee gubernatorial election, 1807
Party	Candidate	Votes	%
Democratic-Republican	John Sevier (incumbent)	18,310	85.80%
Democratic-Republican	William Cocke	3,030	14.20%
Total votes		21,340	100%
