= Neill S. Brown =

American politician and diplomat (1810–1886)

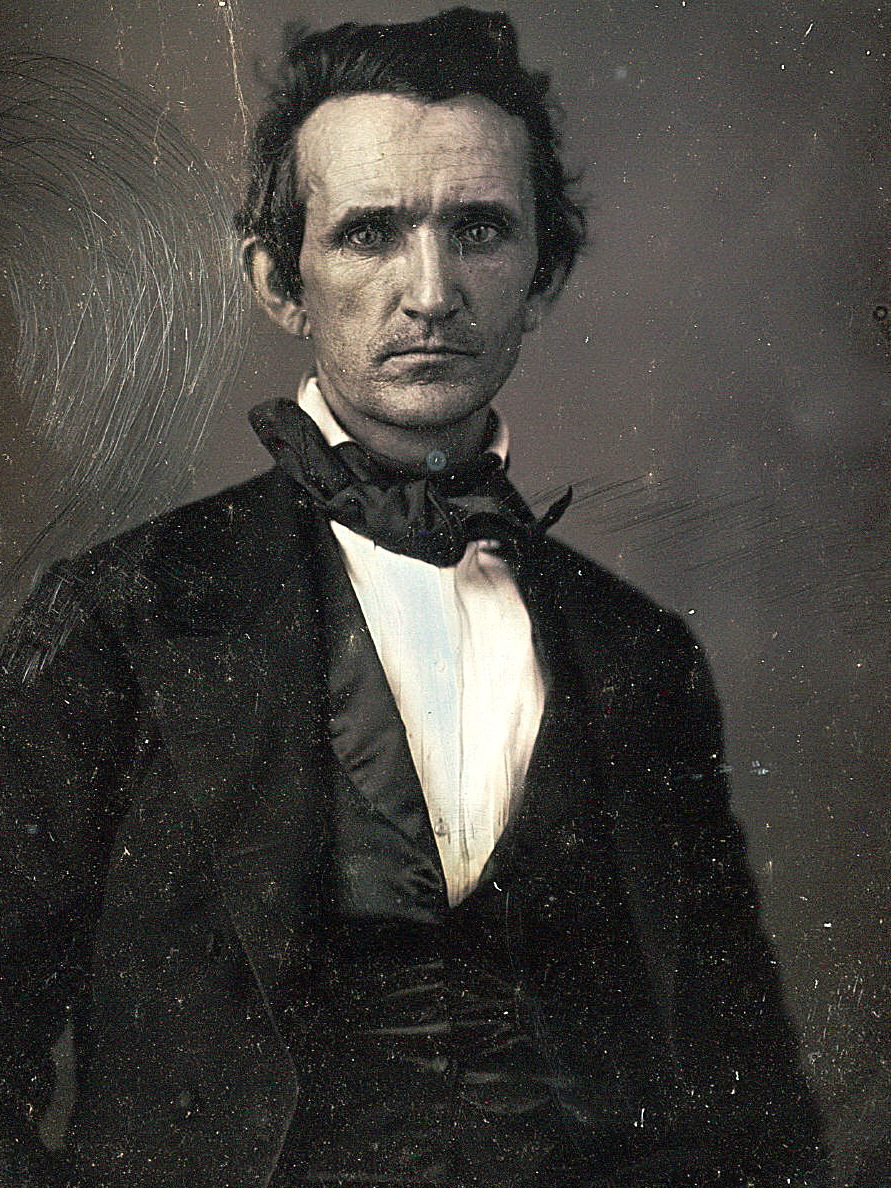
- Daguerreotype of Brown by Mathew Brady, c. 1849

12th Governor of Tennessee
- In office October 17, 1847 – October 16, 1849
- Preceded by: Aaron V. Brown
- Succeeded by: William Trousdale

United States Minister to Russia
- In office May 2, 1850 – June 23, 1853
- President: Zachary Taylor; Millard Fillmore; Franklin Pierce
- Preceded by: Arthur P. Bagby
- Succeeded by: Thomas H. Seymour

Speaker of the Tennessee House of Representatives
- In office 1855–1857
- Preceded by: William H. Wisener
- Succeeded by: Daniel S. Donelson

Personal details
- Born: April 18, 1810 Giles County, Tennessee
- Died: January 30, 1886 (aged 75) Nashville, Tennessee
- Resting place: Mount Olivet Cemetery (Nashville)
- Party: Whig; American
- Spouse: Mary Ann Trimble
- Relations: John C. Brown (brother)
- Profession: Attorney

Neill Smith Brown (April 18, 1810 – January 30, 1886) was an American politician and diplomat who served as the 12th governor of Tennessee from 1847 to 1849, and as the United States Minister to Russia from 1850 to 1853. He also served several terms in the Tennessee House of Representatives, and was Speaker of the House for the 1855–1857 term. A lifelong Whig, Brown campaigned to keep Tennessee in the Union in the years leading up to the Civil War. However, once the war began, he sided with the Confederacy.

== Early life ==
Brown was born in Giles County, Tennessee, the son of Duncan and Margaret Smith Brown. His ancestors were Scots-Irish, and his grandfather, Angus Brown, was a veteran of the American Revolution. His father was an ardent Whig. Brown enrolled in the Manual Labor Academy in Spring Hill, Tennessee, and taught school in Giles County to pay his way. After studying law under Judge James Trimble, he was admitted to the bar in 1834, and briefly practiced in Pulaski, Tennessee.

In 1835, Brown moved to Texas, but quickly grew disillusioned with the lack of organization there, and returned to Tennessee after a few months. In 1836, he fought with the First Tennessee Mounted Volunteers in the Second Seminole War, and eventually rose to the rank of sergeant-major.

== Tennessee politics ==
Brown was a founding member of Tennessee's Whig Party. He was an elector for Hugh Lawson White in 1836, and campaigned for William Henry Harrison and Henry Clay in the presidential elections of 1840 and 1844, respectively. He was elected to the Tennessee House of Representatives in 1837, becoming the legislature's youngest member during the 1837-1839 term. In 1843, Brown ran a competitive race against Democratic incumbent Aaron V. Brown (no relation) for the 6th District congressional seat, but was defeated.

In 1847, Brown won the Whig nomination for governor. His opponent was once again Aaron Brown, who had been elected governor in 1845. Aaron Brown, an associate of President James K. Polk, was an ardent supporter of the Mexican–American War, while Neill Brown opposed it. The war was initially popular, but Tennesseans had grown weary of it by 1847, and Neill Brown was able to win the election by a narrow margin. The Whigs also gained control of the state legislature.

During Brown's lone term as governor, he oversaw the completion of a state school for the blind in Nashville and a state school for the deaf in Knoxville, both of which were launched during the administration of fellow Whig governor James C. Jones earlier in the decade. Brown also signed a law calling for true public schools to be established throughout the state, but it was left to local governments to implement the provisions of this law, and very little was to come out of it.

The end of the Mexican–American War raised the issue of the expansion of slavery into the newly acquired territory. Brown opposed the Wilmot Proviso, which called for slavery to be banned in all territory acquired as a result of the war, but the division in the national Whig Party on the issue damaged the party's image in slave-holding Tennessee. Though Brown fought a competitive campaign in 1849, he was defeated in his bid for reelection by General William Trousdale.

== Minister to Russia ==
Following Brown's defeat in the Tennessee gubernatorial race of 1849, President Zachary Taylor, at the urging of Tennessee Whig Senator John Bell, appointed Brown U.S. Minister to Russia on May 2, 1850. Brown arrived in St. Petersburg in late July 1850, and was presented to Emperor Nicholas I on August 13, 1850. Unaccustomed to the harsh Russian winter, Brown fell ill just a few months after his arrival, and briefly resigned as minister in January 1851, stating that the Russian climate was "unfitting for the abodes of Man." Upon his recovery in March 1851, however, he withdrew his resignation.

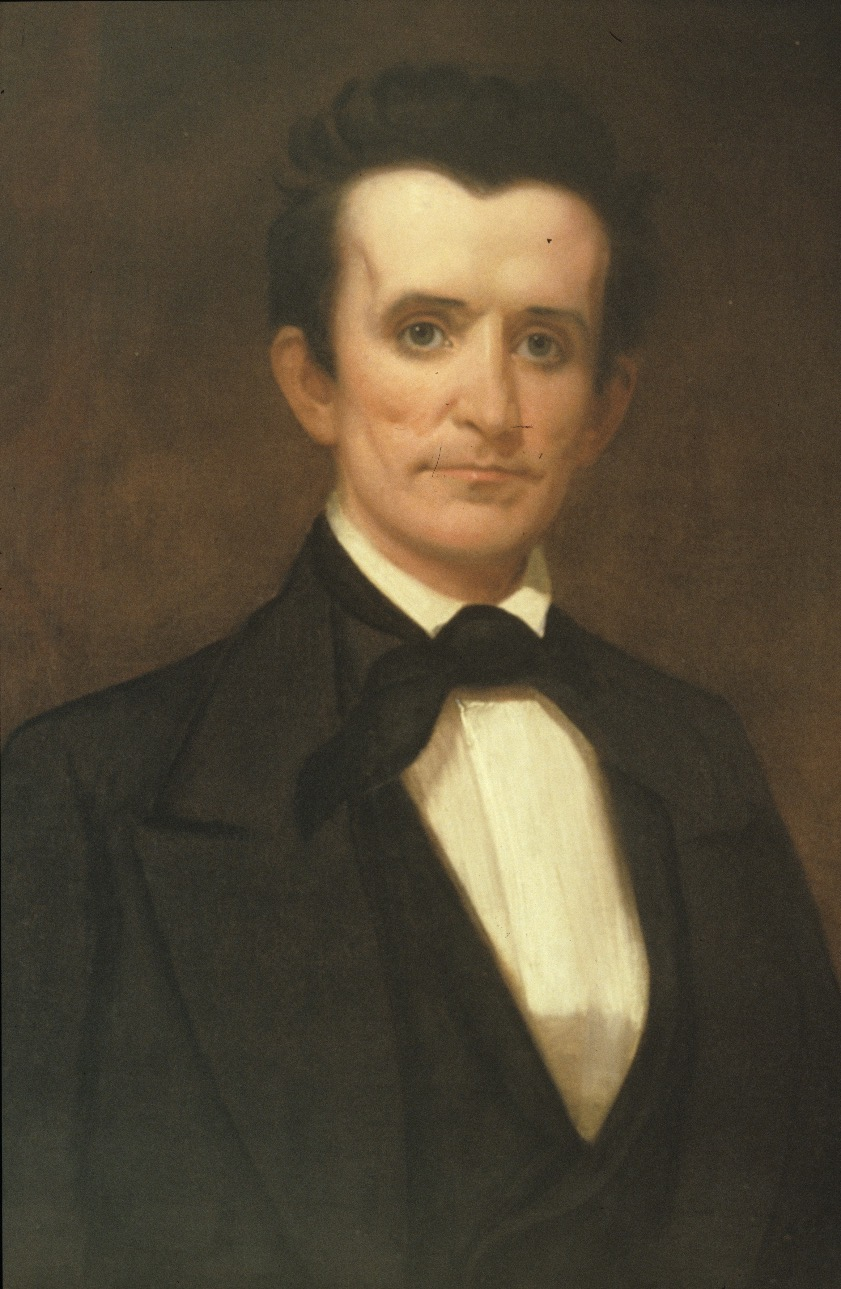
Portrait of Brown by Washington Bogart Cooper c. 1849

Brown arrived in Russia at a turbulent time in Russo-American affairs. The Emperor was uneasy about the recent Revolutions of 1848, which consisted largely of democratic revolts against monarchies, and was aware that many Americans sympathized with these revolts. Americans, likewise, were angry over Russia's intervention in the Hungarian Revolution of 1848 and its deposing of pro-democracy leader Lajos Kossuth, and some Americans were calling for intervention on behalf of the revolutionaries. Though Brown personally disapproved of Nicholas's actions, he nevertheless warned American leaders that Kossuth was a troublemaker, and argued that American intervention would be disastrous.

Brown had a somewhat pessimistic view of Russian society. He stated that Russians lacked the spirit of invention, and were consistently copying other countries' innovations in both industry and art. "All they have is borrowed," he wrote, "except the miserable climate." While he praised Nicholas's work ethic, he thought the emperor micromanaged his various departments. Brown was constantly frustrated by bureaucratic delays, and found Russian censorship of mail and media appalling. He was also puzzled by the rise of slavophilia, which he believed could not compete with western culture.

In spite of his misgivings about Russian society, Brown urged the United States to compete in the vast Russian market. He helped convince the Emperor to abandon an increase in duties on cotton imports, and secured Russian approval of the Clayton–Bulwer Treaty between the U.S. and Britain. In his last weeks in office, Brown expressed concern over the build-up to the Crimean War, and the effect such a conflict might have on U.S. commercial interests.

== Secession crisis, the Civil War and later life ==
Upon his return from Russia, Brown resumed his role as a leader of Tennessee's Whigs. After the collapse of the national Whig Party, he aligned himself with the American Party ("Know Nothings"), and in 1855 was once again elected to the state House of Representatives, this time representing Davidson County. He was selected as speaker shortly afterward.

In the mid-1850s, Brown campaigned across the state on behalf of presidential candidate Millard Fillmore, but was largely outshone by rising Democratic politician and future Confederate governor Isham Harris, who was campaigning on behalf of James Buchanan. Brown attended the Constitutional Union Party convention in 1860, and helped nominate fellow Tennessean John Bell as the party's presidential candidate.

On April 18, 1861, following the attack on Fort Sumter in South Carolina, Brown and several other Whig leaders published a letter reaffirming their pro-Union stance. While they dismissed secession, "both as a constitutional right and as a remedy for existing evils," they nevertheless stated that Tennessee and other southern states were obliged to defend themselves should federal troops invade.

In May 1861, Oliver Perry Temple, a Whig attorney from Knoxville, met with Brown and several other Whig leaders in Nashville. Temple later recalled that Brown seemed "paralyzed" by the rapid rise of secessionist sentiment in the city, but nevertheless delivered an "eloquent" denunciation of secession. Shortly after this meeting, however, Brown abandoned his support for the Union, and marched with a parade in Nashville in support of the new Confederate States of America. When Union soldiers occupied Nashville in 1862, Brown was jailed and his house was burned.

Following the war, Tennessee's radical governor, William Brownlow, ordered the arrest of Isham Harris, and offered a $5,000 reward for his capture. Exiled in England, but longing to return to Tennessee, Harris contacted Brown in 1867, and asked for his help. Brown paid a visit to Brownlow, with whom he had campaigned throughout the 1850s, and appealed for clemency on Harris's behalf. Brownlow immediately granted the request and offered Harris immunity, and withdrew the arrest warrant.

Although Brown was not elevated to elective office post-war, his was an influential voice. He served on committees and gave an inspiring, heart-felt speech at the June 1868 Democratic State Convention. Brown also attended the state constitutional convention of 1870, which composed the current Constitution of Tennessee. He also campaigned for his younger brother, John C. Brown, who served as governor of Tennessee from 1871 to 1875.

Brown died on January 30, 1886, and is interred at Mount Olivet Cemetery in Nashville, Tennessee.

Party political offices
Preceded by Ephraim H. Foster	Whig nominee for Governor of Tennessee; 1847, 1849	Succeeded by William B. Campbell
Political offices
Preceded by Aaron V. Brown	Governor of Tennessee; 1847–1849	Succeeded by William Trousdale
