= Willie Blount =

American politician (1768–1835)

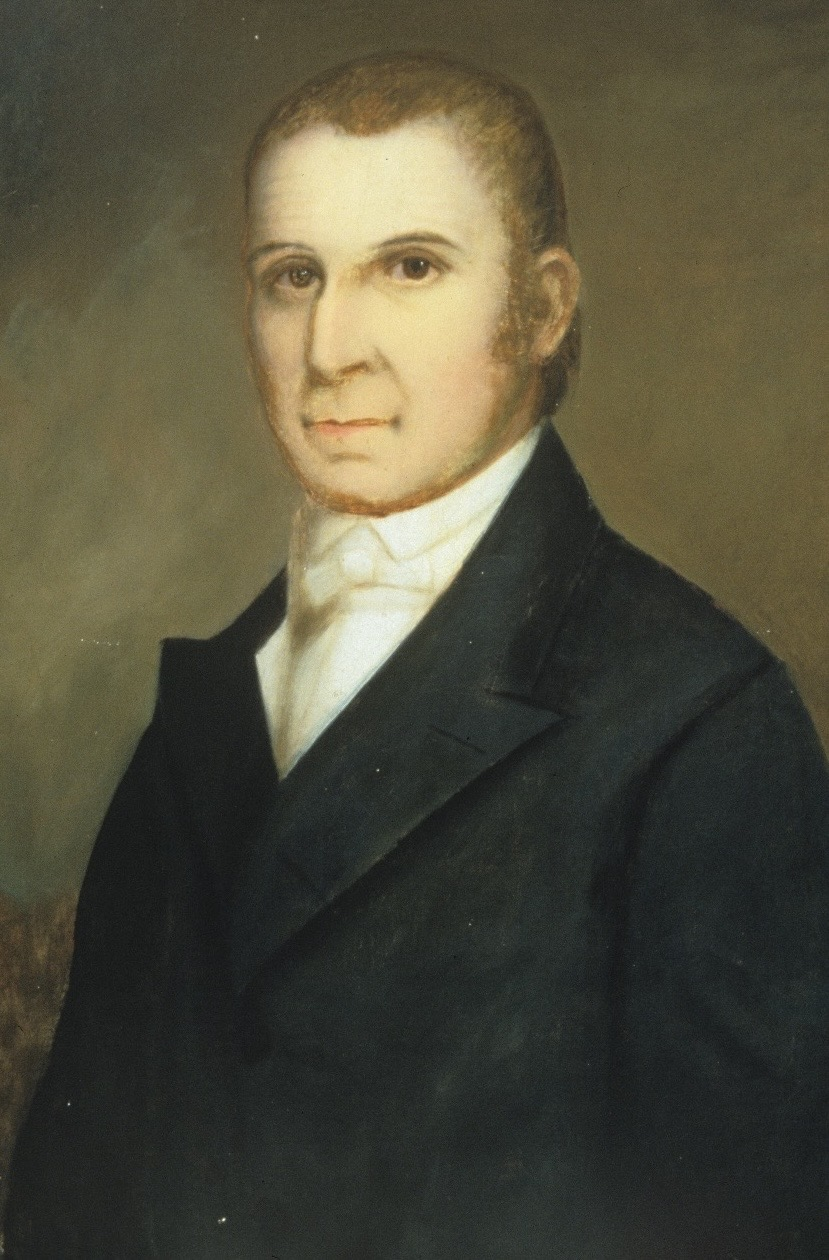
- Portrait by Washington Bogart Cooper

3rd Governor of Tennessee
- In office September 20, 1809 – September 27, 1815
- Preceded by: John Sevier
- Succeeded by: Joseph McMinn

Member of the Tennessee House of Representatives
- In office 1807–1809

Personal details
- Born: April 18, 1768 Bertie County, Province of North Carolina, British America
- Died: September 10, 1835 (aged 67) Nashville, Tennessee, U.S.
- Resting place: Greenwood Cemetery; Clarksville, Tennessee
- Party: Democratic-Republican
- Spouse: Lucinda Baker
- Relations: William Blount (half-brother), Thomas Blount (half-brother), William Grainger Blount (nephew)

Willie Blount (April 18, 1768 – September 10, 1835) was an American politician who served as the third governor of Tennessee from 1809 to 1815. Blount's efforts to raise funds and soldiers during the War of 1812 earned Tennessee the nickname, "Volunteer State." He was the younger half-brother of Southwest Territory governor, William Blount. He was a member of the Democratic-Republican Party.

== Early life ==
Willie (pronounced "Wiley") was born at Blount Hall in Bertie County in the Province of North Carolina, to Jacob Blount and his second wife, Hannah Salter Blount. He studied at the College of New Jersey (modern Princeton) and King's College (modern Columbia). He read law with Judge John Sitgreaves in New Bern, North Carolina, in the 1780s, and was admitted to the North Carolina bar.

In 1790, Willie's brother, William, was appointed governor of the newly created Southwest Territory, and Willie accompanied him to the new territory to serve as his private secretary. When Tennessee was admitted as a state in 1796, the state legislature appointed Willie Blount to the Superior Court of Law and Equity (the state's highest court at the time), though he either declined the appointment or resigned before issuing any opinions.

Following William Blount's death in 1800, Willie Blount took charge of the family finances, and quickly discovered that his brother's risky land investments had left the family deeply in debt. In 1802, he moved to Montgomery County, Tennessee, where he established a large plantation, and gradually began restoring the family's financial affairs. He represented Montgomery County in the Tennessee House of Representatives from 1807 to 1809.

== Governor ==
In 1809, Blount ran for governor against former U.S. senator and frontiersman, William Cocke (the incumbent, John Sevier, was term-limited). Population shifts had begun to favor Middle and West Tennessee over Cocke's home of East Tennessee, and Blount won the election, 13,686 votes to 8,435. He was reelected without opposition in 1811 and 1813.

Like his predecessors, Sevier and Archibald Roane, much of Blount's governorship was spent dealing with conflicts between Indians and white settlers. He persistently sought to acquire land from the Cherokee and Chickasaw, and attempted to suppress the activities of hostile Choctaws and Creeks. Early in his term, he suggested in a letter to Secretary of War William Eustis that the Cherokee be relocated to lands west of the Mississippi River, an act carried out two decades later by President Andrew Jackson. He also blamed northern tribes for encouraging the Creeks to harass white settlers, and at one point requested Eustis send troops to sever communications between northern and southern tribes.

During Blount's tenure, Tennessee was divided into five judicial districts. He signed anti-counterfeiting measures, and enacted legislation to settle conflicting land claims from Tennessee's pre-statehood period. Blount also sought navigational improvements, overseeing the completion of the Cumberland Turnpike (connecting Nashville and Knoxville), and calling for a navigable waterway from Tennessee to Mobile, Alabama.

During his second and third terms, Blount was occupied with the War of 1812. During the first few months of the war, he struggled with a lack of communication with the War Department as he awaited permission to order the militia (led by an increasingly impatient Andrew Jackson) south to New Orleans. Following the Fort Mims massacre in 1813, a call to arms issued by Blount was met by 3,500 volunteers. These were divided into two divisions led by Jackson and John Cocke, and ordered south to suppress the hostile Creek tribes. Blount managed to raise over $300,000 for the expedition, an astonishing sum of money for the time. The surprising number of volunteers earned Tennessee the nickname, "Volunteer State."

At the end of the War of 1812, Blount was at the height of his popularity. Historian J. G. M. Ramsey wrote, "Willie's popularity with the masses has rarely been equalled." In 1815, constitutional term limits prevented him from seeking a fourth consecutive term.

== Later life ==
In 1827, Blount ran for governor against Congressman Sam Houston and ex-Congressman Newton Cannon (the incumbent, William Carroll, was term-limited), but placed a distant third, winning just 1,784 votes to 44,243 for Houston and 32,929 for Cannon. In 1834, Blount represented Montgomery County at the state constitutional convention, which drafted a new document to replace the one in effect since the state had been admitted in 1796, and which has many similarities to the 1870 constitution which is still in effect. One of the chief differences between the 1834 constitution and its predecessor was considerably greater powers being granted to the executive branch than in the earlier document.

Blount died in Nashville on September 10, 1835, and is interred at Greenwood Cemetery in Clarksville. In 1878, the state placed a large monument on his grave.

== Family and legacy ==
Blount married Lucinda Baker in 1802. They had two daughters, Eliza Ann Blount and Lucinda Blount.

Blount was the younger half-brother of William Blount, a signer of the United States Constitution and governor of the Southwest Territory. Another half-brother, Thomas Blount, was a congressman from North Carolina, and a nephew, William Grainger Blount, represented Tennessee's 2nd district in Congress from 1815 to 1819. Willie Blount was the great-great grandfather of Harry Hill McAlister, who served as Governor of Tennessee in the 1930s.

In 1803, Blount published a school textbook, A Catechetical Exposition of the Constitution of the State of Tennessee, which was printed by early Knoxville newspaper editor George Roulstone. Blount later made plans to write a comprehensive history of the state, but this work was never completed.

Blount County, Alabama, is named in Willie Blount's honor for his assistance during the Creek War.

Political offices
Preceded by John Sevier	Governor of Tennessee; 1809–1815	Succeeded by Joseph McMinn
