= Hale House =

Hale House is the name of several buildings.

- Stephen Fowler Hale House, Eutaw, Alabama
- Hale House, Hoover, Alabama, listed on the Alabama Register of Landmarks and Heritage
- Hale House (Los Angeles, California)
- Nathan Hale Homestead, Coventry, Connecticut, also called the Deacon Richard Hale House
- Dr. Elizur Hale House, Glastonbury, Connecticut
- Hale-Byrnes House, Stanton, Delaware
- Hale House (University of Chicago), Chicago, Illinois
- John Hale House, Beverly, Massachusetts
- Edward Everett Hale House, Boston, Massachusetts
- Rosemont (Woodville, Mississippi), also called the Hale House
- William Hale House, Dover, New Hampshire
- Dinsmoor–Hale House, Keene, New Hampshire
- Hale House, Elizabethtown, New York, part of the Hand–Hale Historic District
- Hale House Center, New York, New York, founded by Clara Hale
- Elijah Hale Residence, Bath Township, Ohio, listed on the National Register of Historic Places (NRHP)
- Jonathan Hale House, Bath Township, Ohio, part of the Hale Farm and Village
- Kearns-Hale House, Zanesville, Ohio, listed on the NRHP
- Hale House (South Kingstown, Rhode Island)
- Hale–Elmore–Seibels House, Columbia, South Carolina
- Patterson Hotel (Watertown, Tennessee), also called the Hale House
- Stephen G. Bourne House, Fries, Virginia, also called the Bourne-Hale House
- Captain Calvin and Pamela Hale House, Olympia, Washington
- Dr. James W. Hale House, Princeton, West Virginia
- Henry Fiedler House, Orion, Wisconsin, also called the Ellen Hale House, listed on the NRHP

== See also ==
- Hale Park, Hampshire, England
- Hale Manor, Isle of Wight, England
- Hales Mansion, Oklahoma City
- Joseph Haile House, Providence, Rhode Island
