= National Register of Historic Places listings in Wilson County, Tennessee =

Location of Wilson County in Tennessee

Wilson County, Tennessee, United States, has 25 properties and districts listed on the National Register of Historic Places. Latitude and longitude coordinates are provided for many National Register properties and districts; these locations may be seen together in a map.

Contents: Counties in Tennessee
Anderson – Bedford – Benton – Bledsoe – Blount – Bradley – Campbell – Cannon – Carroll – Carter – Cheatham – Chester – Claiborne – Clay – Cocke – Coffee – Crockett – Cumberland – Davidson – Decatur – DeKalb – Dickson – Dyer – Fayette – Fentress – Franklin – Gibson – Giles – Grainger – Greene – Grundy – Hamblen – Hamilton – Hancock – Hardeman – Hardin – Hawkins – Haywood – Henderson – Henry – Hickman – Houston – Humphreys – Jackson – Jefferson – Johnson – Knox – Lake – Lauderdale – Lawrence – Lewis – Lincoln – Loudon – Macon – Madison – Marion – Marshall – Maury – McMinn – McNairy – Meigs – Monroe – Montgomery – Moore – Morgan – Obion – Overton – Perry – Pickett – Polk – Putnam – Rhea – Roane – Robertson – Rutherford – Scott – Sequatchie – Sevier – Shelby – Smith – Stewart – Sullivan – Sumner – Tipton – Trousdale – Unicoi – Union – Van Buren – Warren – Washington – Wayne – Weakley – White – Williamson – Wilson

This National Park Service list is complete through NPS recent listings posted November 21, 2025.

== Current listings ==
	Name on the Register	Image	Date listed	Location	City or town	Description
1	Bailey Graveyard	Bailey Graveyard	March 28, 1996 (#96000338)	654 N. McKee Rd. 36°10′04″N 86°07′36″W	Watertown	
2	Harry Bailey House	Harry Bailey House	March 15, 2000 (#00000230)	423 Trousdale Ferry Rd. 36°12′33″N 86°16′07″W	Lebanon vicinity	
3	I.W.P. Buchanan House	I.W.P. Buchanan House	January 8, 1979 (#79002487)	428 W. Main St. 36°12′31″N 86°18′02″W	Lebanon	Designed by Knoxville architect George F. Barber
4	Camp Bell	Camp Bell	April 15, 1982 (#82004074)	Coles Ferry Pike; 36°13′30″N 86°18′23″W	Lebanon	
5	Dr. John Owen Campbell House	Dr. John Owen Campbell House	December 8, 1980 (#80003884)	2344 Lebanon Rd; 36°13′39″N 86°21′43″W	Lebanon	Built in 1842
6	Castle Heights Academy Historic District	Castle Heights Academy Historic District	January 11, 1996 (#95001507)	Junction of Castle Heights Ave., N. and Cadet Ct. 36°12′45″N 86°18′26″W	Lebanon	Now serves as Lebanon City Hall.
7	Cedar Heights Farmhouse		May 10, 2024 (#100010336)	704 Taylor Lane; 36°12′00″N 86°33′00″W	Mt. Juliet	
8	Cedars of Lebanon State Park Historic District	Cedars of Lebanon State Park Historic District	November 7, 1995 (#95001274)	Cedar Forest Rd. in Cedars of Lebanon State Park; 36°05′08″N 86°18′48″W	Lebanon vicinity	
9	Chandler Stone Wall	Chandler Stone Wall	July 19, 2001 (#01000757)	Old Lebanon Dirt Rd., 2 miles west of Mount Juliet Rd. 36°11′42″N 86°33′10″W	Mt. Juliet	
10	John Cloyd House	John Cloyd House	October 1, 1974 (#74001931)	13988 US-70 Old Hickory; 36°13′16″N 86°33′35″W	Mt. Juliet	
11	Fite-Fessenden House	Fite-Fessenden House	July 5, 1985 (#85001488)	236 W. Main St. 36°12′30″N 86°17′42″W	Lebanon	Actual street address is 236 W. Main; now houses the Wilson County Museum
12	Hale House-Patterson Hotel	Hale House-Patterson Hotel	March 14, 1997 (#97000245)	116 Depot St. 36°06′00″N 86°21′25″W	Watertown	
13	Lebanon Commercial Historic District	Lebanon Commercial Historic District	November 18, 1999 (#99001373)	Roughly around the public square, and 104-124 N. College, 105-115 N. Cumberland, 102-203 E. Main, and 103-122 E. Market St; 36°12′29″N 86°17′27″W	Lebanon	
14	Lebanon Woolen Mills	Lebanon Woolen Mills	July 12, 2007 (#07000687)	218 N. Maple St. 36°12′33″N 86°17′37″W	Lebanon	Now known as the Mill at Lebanon; currently being renovated as a shopping center
15	Memorial Hall, Cumberland University	Memorial Hall, Cumberland University	April 29, 1977 (#77001301)	Cumberland University campus 36°12′14″N 86°18′00″W	Lebanon	
16	Mitchell House	Mitchell House	December 6, 1979 (#79003435)	106 North Castle Heights Avenue Lebanon TN 37087; 36°12′40″N 86°18′29″W	Lebanon	Owned by the City Of Lebanon and now serves as personnel offices.
17	Pickett Chapel Methodist Church	Pickett Chapel Methodist Church	April 18, 1977 (#77001302)	E. Market St. 36°12′32″N 86°17′19″W	Lebanon	Built in 1827; currently being restored
18	Rest Hill Cemetery	Rest Hill Cemetery	March 25, 1993 (#93000212)	State Route 141 east of its junction with the State Route 24 bypass 36°12′35″N 86°16′13″W	Lebanon vicinity	
19	William Washington Seay House	William Washington Seay House	August 25, 1995 (#95001044)	10575 Trousdale Ferry Pike; 36°12′19″N 86°06′26″W	Flat Rock	
20	Sellars Indian Mound	Sellars Indian Mound	December 11, 1972 (#72001256)	Address Restricted; 36°10′12″N 86°14′26″W	Lebanon vicinity	
21	Warner Price Mumford Smith House	Warner Price Mumford Smith House	July 22, 1993 (#93000647)	10277 Lebanon Rd. 36°13′56″N 86°29′49″W	Mt. Juliet	
22	Spring Creek Presbyterian Church	Spring Creek Presbyterian Church	November 8, 2000 (#00001356)	Cainsville; 36°05′34″N 86°14′20″W	Doaks Crossroads	
23	Ida New and William Madison Turner Farm		November 7, 1995 (#95001275)	3964 Old Murfreesboro Rd. 36°09′02″N 86°19′36″W	Lebanon vicinity	
24	Watertown Commercial Historic District	Watertown Commercial Historic District	November 8, 2000 (#00001353)	Roughly along Main St., Depot Ave., and Public Square; 36°05′59″N 86°08′02″W	Watertown	
25	Williamson Chapel CME Church Complex	Williamson Chapel CME Church Complex	November 15, 2006 (#06001039)	1576 Needmore Rd. 36°14′39″N 86°33′44″W	Greenlawn	

== Former listings ==
	Name on the Register	Image	Date listed	Date removed	Location	City or town	Description
1	Belle Isle		May 22, 1980 (#80003883)	February 1, 1983	NW of Lebanon on Cairo Bend Rd.	Lebanon vicinity	

== See also ==
- List of National Historic Landmarks in Tennessee
- National Register of Historic Places listings in Tennessee
