= Robert L. Caruthers =

American judge (1800–1882)

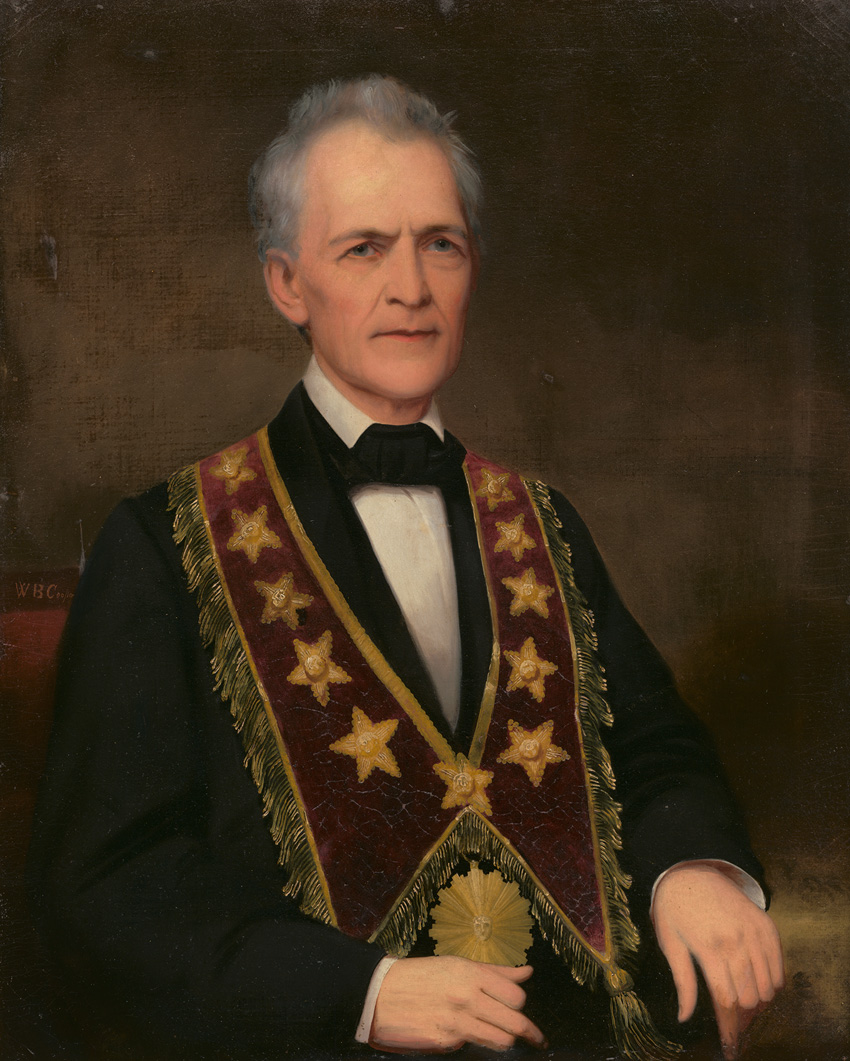
- Caruthers in Masonic regalia, c. 1849

Member of the U.S. House of Representatives from Tennessee's 7th district
- In office March 4, 1841 – March 3, 1843
- Preceded by: John Bell
- Succeeded by: David W. Dickinson

Personal details
- Born: July 31, 1800 Carthage, Tennessee, US
- Died: October 2, 1882 (aged 82) Lebanon, Tennessee, US
- Resting place: Cedar Grove Cemetery; Lebanon, Tennessee
- Party: Whig
- Spouse: Sally Sanders (m. 1827; died 1870)

Robert Looney Caruthers (July 31, 1800 – October 2, 1882) was an American judge, politician, and professor. He helped establish Cumberland University in 1842, serving as the first president of its board of trustees, and was a cofounder of the Cumberland School of Law, one of the oldest law schools in the South. He served as a Tennessee state attorney general in the late 1820s and early 1830s, and was a justice of the Tennessee Supreme Court in the 1850s and early 1860s. He also served one term in the United States House of Representatives (1841–1843). In 1863, he was elected Governor of Tennessee by the state's Confederates, but never took office.

== Early life and career ==
Robert Looney Caruthers was born near Carthage, Tennessee, the youngest of seven children of Samuel and Elizabeth Looney Caruthers. His grandfather had represented Sullivan County at the constitutional convention of the State of Franklin in the 1780s. After his death, Robert went to live with an uncle in Columbia, Tennessee, where he attended Woodward Academy. He later attended Washington College near Jonesborough and Greeneville College in Greeneville, and studied law under Judge Samuel Powell in Greeneville.

Caruthers returned to Carthage in 1823 to practice law. He served as the clerk for the Tennessee House of Representatives for the 1823–1824 term, and worked as editor of the Tennessee Republican newsletter. In 1826, he moved to Lebanon, Tennessee, and married Sally Sanders, a niece of Andrew Jackson's wife, Rachel Donelson Jackson. That same year, he was appointed attorney general for the Sixth Judicial District (based in Lebanon) by Governor Sam Houston. He served in this position until 1832. In 1834, he was elected brigadier general in the Tennessee militia. In 1836, he and Alfred O. P. Nicholson published A Compilation of the Statutes of Tennessee, which remained the state's standard compilation of statutes for over two decades.

In 1835, Caruthers was elected to the Tennessee House of Representatives, representing Wilson County. He served on the House Judiciary Committee, and did not seek reelection. He was elected to the U.S. House of Representatives for Tennessee's 7th District for the 1841–1843 term. Once again, he served just one term, and did not seek reelection. In 1844, he was the Whig elector for Tennessee's at-large district, and as such, canvassed the state for unsuccessful presidential candidate Henry Clay.

In 1852, Caruthers was appointed by Governor William B. Campbell to fill the term of Nathan Green (who had retired) as Middle Tennessee's justice of the Tennessee Supreme Court. The following year, the state legislature voted to give Caruthers a full term. In 1854, after the state constitution was amended to allow popular election of justices, Caruthers won reelection to the court.

One of Caruthers' most important decisions on the court was his opinion in Rippy v. State (1858), which involved killing in self-defense. In this decision, he rejected a literal interpretation of a statement in Judge John Catron's opinion in Grainger v. State, issued three decades earlier, that suggested a person did not need sufficient grounds to kill in self-defense, but merely needed to testify that there was imminent danger. Caruthers' opinion reinstated the "sufficient grounds" rule. He wrote of Grainger, "no case has been more perverted and misapplied by advocates and juries."

Prior to the outbreak of the Civil War, Caruthers was a delegate to the Washington Peace Convention in February 1861, which sought to find a peaceful resolution to the sectional strife between the North and South. He remained pro-Union until the Battle of Fort Sumter in April 1861, after which he aligned himself with the Confederacy. In August 1861, he resigned from the court to represent Tennessee in the Provisional Confederate Congress.

On July 17, 1863, the state's Confederate leaders met in Winchester, Tennessee, and nominated Caruthers for governor to replace Isham G. Harris, who was prohibited by the state constitution from seeking a fourth consecutive term. Caruthers was officially elected on August 6, but the state constitution required that the governor-elect take the oath of office before the General Assembly. Since the Union Army controlled most of Middle and West Tennessee at this time, the Assembly was unable to convene, and Caruthers never officially took office. Confederates continued to recognize Harris as governor until the end of the war. Union forces, in the meantime, had installed Andrew Johnson as military governor.

== Cumberland University ==
Cumberland University was established in Lebanon by the Cumberland Presbyterian Church in 1842. Winstead Paine Bone, in his book, A History of Cumberland University, wrote that Caruthers, a member of the Cumberland Presbyterian Church, "had more to do with the founding of Cumberland University than any other person." He was appointed president of the school's first board of trustees in the Summer of 1842, and helped the school secure a charter in December of the following year. He remained president of the board until his death in 1882.

In 1847, Caruthers and his brother, Abraham Caruthers, founded the Cumberland School of Law, one of the first law schools in the South. The school, which had an initial enrollment of seven students, held its first classes in Robert Caruthers' law office. As an instructor, Abraham Caruthers abandoned the lecture system, and instead assigned a chapter from a law text, and quizzed each student on the chapter the following day, considering this the best way to determine the areas in which a student was struggling. He also held moot courts. During the Civil War, Nathan Green, Jr., whose father had been succeeded by Robert Caruthers on the Tennessee Supreme Court in 1852, managed to keep the school open.

Caruthers joined the Cumberland School of Law's faculty as a professor of law in 1868, replacing Judge Henry Cooper. In 1878, in memory of his brother, Abraham, he funded the construction of Caruthers Hall, which housed the law school for several decades. He resigned from the faculty in 1880.

== Death and legacy ==
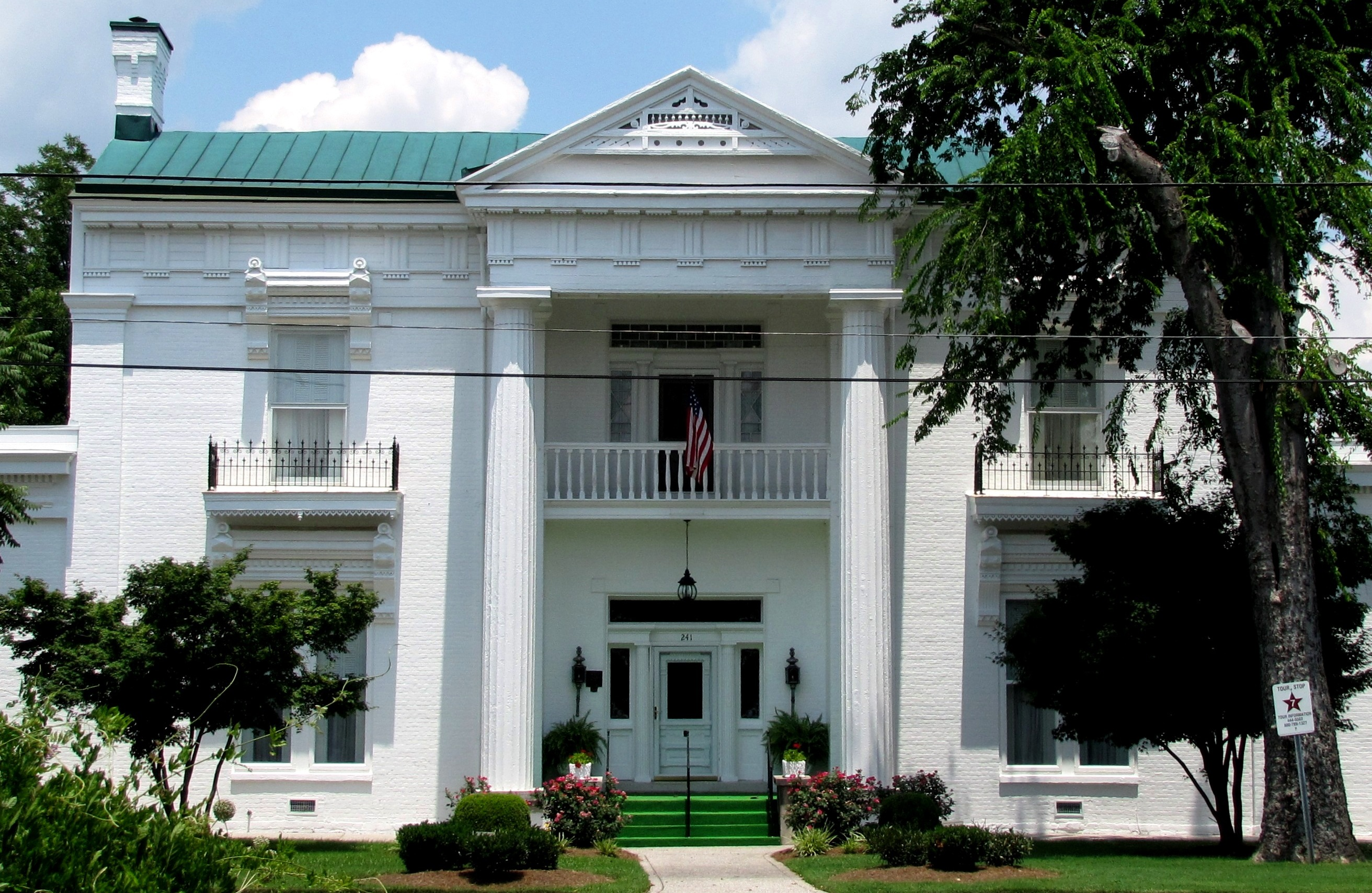
The Caruthers House (2010)

Caruthers died in Lebanon on October 2, 1882. He was buried in the city's Cedar Grove Cemetery. Along with being an elder in the Cumberland Presbyterian Church, Caruthers was the Grand Master of the Grand Lodge of Tennessee Free and Accepted Masons. His house, built in 1828, still stands on West Main Street in Lebanon. The house was designed by Henry Reiff, who built the original Hermitage mansion for Andrew Jackson in Hermitage in 1819.

U.S. House of Representatives
Preceded by John Bell	Member of the U.S. House of Representatives from Tennessee's 7th congressional district 1841–1843	Succeeded by David W. Dickinson
Masonic offices
Preceded by Hardy M. Burton	Grand Master of the Grand Lodge of Tennessee; 1849	Succeeded by Charles A. Fuller
Political offices
New constituency	Delegate from Tennessee to the Provisional Congress of the Confederate States; 1861–1862	Constituency abolished
