= Anthony Crockett =

Anthony Crockett may refer to:

- Anthony Crockett (bishop) (1945–2008), Welsh Anglican bishop
- Anthony Crockett (soldier) (1754–1838), American soldier and politician
