= Dr. John Owen Campbell House =

Historic house in Tennessee, United States

- U.S. National Register of Historic Places
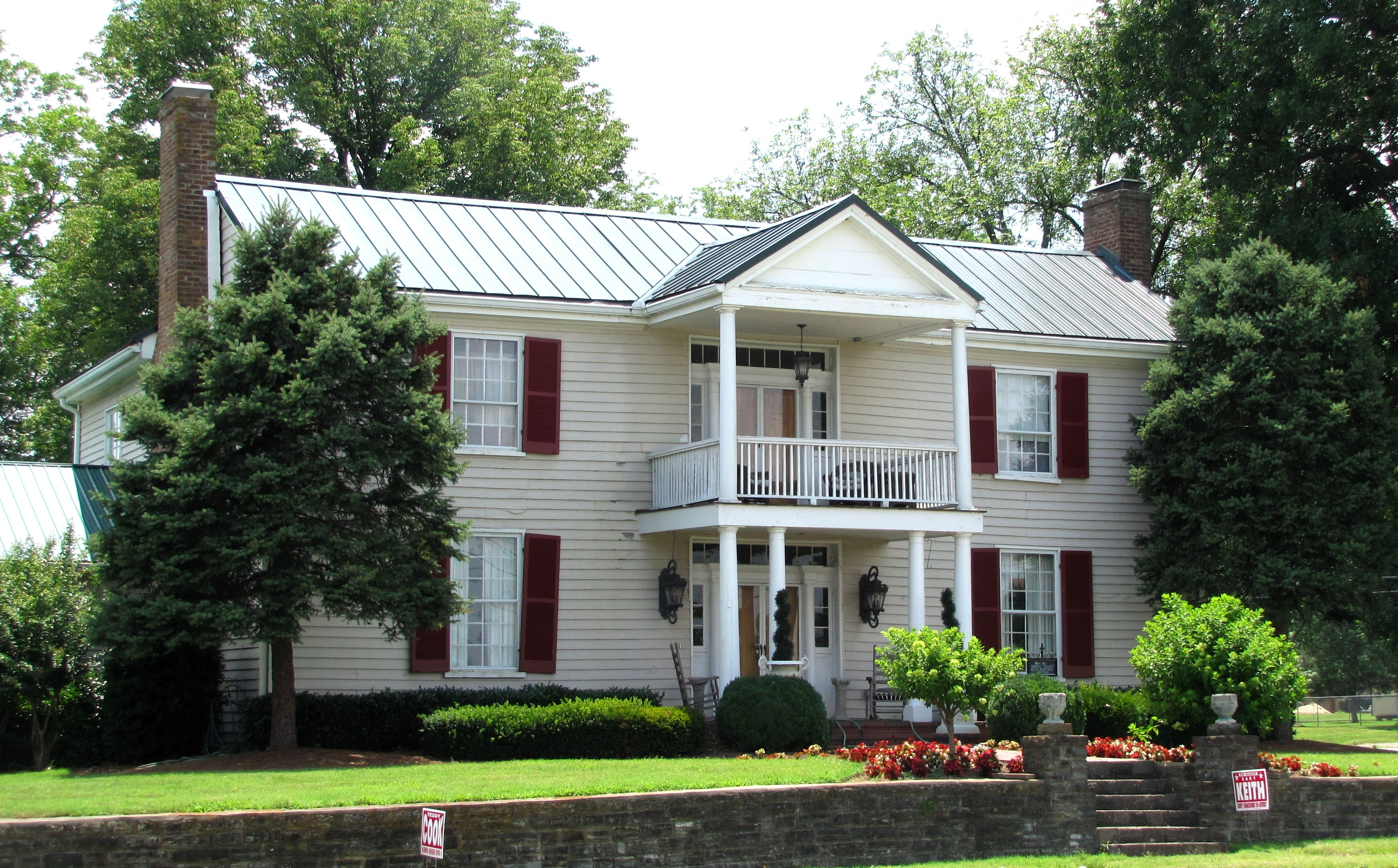
- The Dr. John Owen Campbell House in 2010

- Location within Tennessee Location within the United States
- Nearest city: Lebanon, Tennessee
- Coordinates: 36°13′39″N 86°21′43″W
- Area: 1.5 acres (0.61 ha)
- Built: 1843
- Architectural style: Greek Revival
- NRHP reference No.: 80003884
- Added to NRHP: December 8, 1980

The Dr. John Owen Campbell House is a historic house in Lebanon, Tennessee, United States. It was built from 1841 to 1843 for B. W. G. Winford. It was designed in the Greek Revival architectural style. It remained in the Winford family until 1906, when Winford's son-in-law, B. F. Lester, sold it to Dr. John Owen Campbell, the son of Tennessee Governor William Bowen Campbell. It was later acquired by Herbert C. Ruck. It has been listed on the National Register of Historic Places since December 8, 1980.
