= Warner Price Mumford Smith House =

Historic house in Tennessee, United States

- U.S. National Register of Historic Places
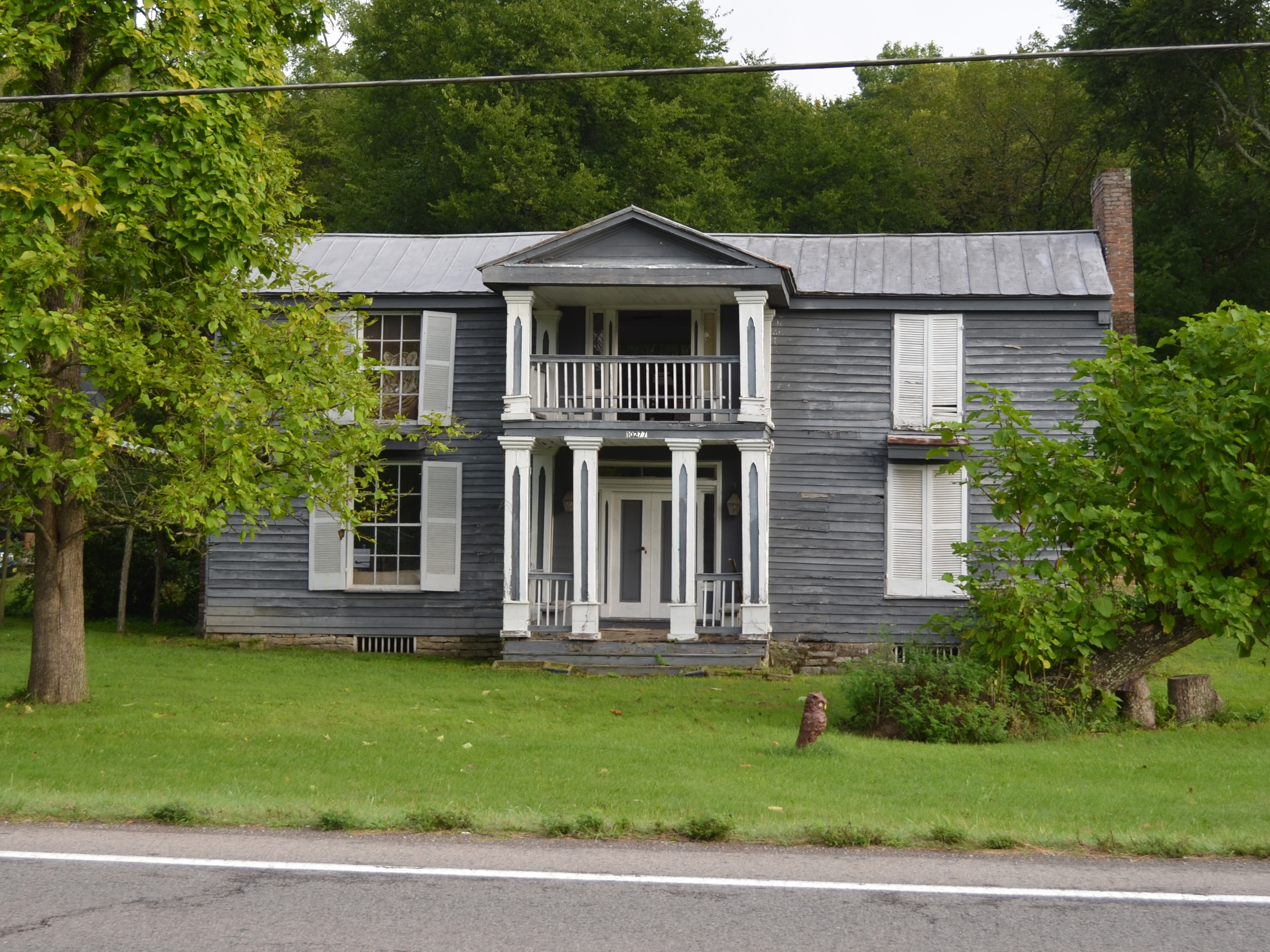
- The Warner Prince Mumford Smith House in 2014

- Location within Tennessee Location within the United States
- Nearest city: Mount Juliet, Tennessee
- Coordinates: 36°13′56″N 86°29′49″W
- Area: 1.8 acres (0.73 ha)
- Built: 1853
- Architectural style: Greek Revival, Vernacular, I-House
- NRHP reference No.: 93000647
- Added to NRHP: July 22, 1993

The Warner Price Mumford Smith House, also known as Old Home Place, is a historic two-story cedar-plank I-house with a Greek Revival portico in Mount Juliet, Tennessee, U.S. The land was granted to Private Charles Webb; the house later belonged to John Bell Vivrett. It was purchased by Warner Price Mumford Smith and his wife, Augusta Amelia Houser in 1853; the Smiths owned a flour mill and a stagecoach stop. Their son, Robert Edmund Lee Smith, purchased the house in 1909; it was inherited by their daughter Dora Smith Moser in 1967, and by their grandson, Michael F. Moser, in 1991. It has been listed on the National Register of Historic Places since July 22, 1993.

The anarchist publisher Ross Winn was married to Augusta "Gussie" Smith, and the two lived together in this house from 1900 until Winn's death from tuberculosis in 1912. During this time he published the newspaper Winn's Firebrand, and later The Advance, from this house.
