= Camp Bell (Lebanon, Tennessee) =

Historic house in Tennessee, United States

- U.S. National Register of Historic Places
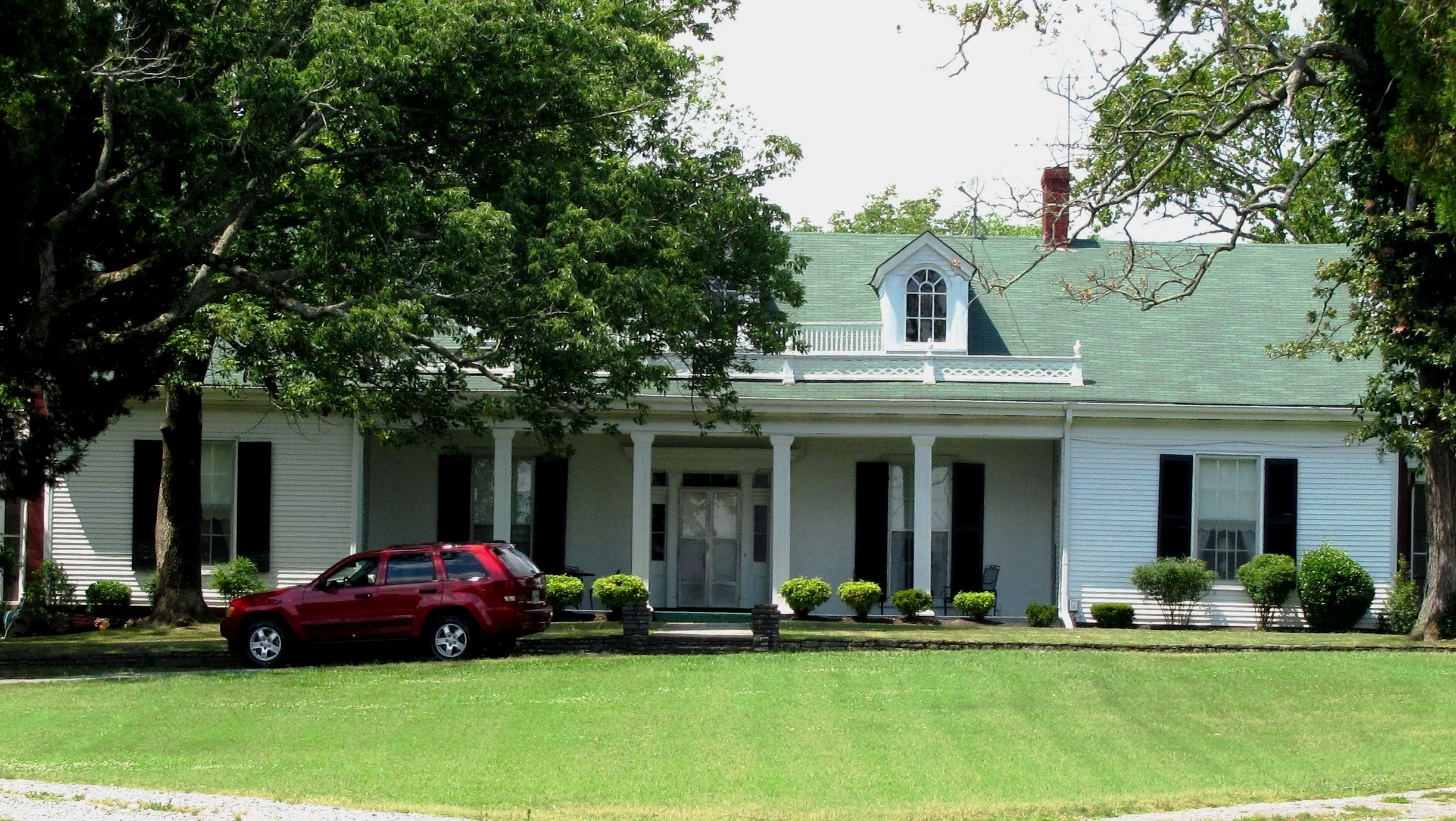
- Camp Bell in 2010

- Location within Tennessee Location within the United States
- Nearest city: Lebanon, Tennessee
- Coordinates: 36°13′30″N 86°18′23″W
- Area: 8 acres (3.2 ha)
- Built: 1835
- Architectural style: Greek Revival
- NRHP reference No.: 82004074
- Added to NRHP: April 15, 1982

Camp Bell is a historic house in Lebanon, Tennessee, United States. It was built circa 1835 for William Seawell. It was designed in the Greek Revival architectural style. It was later purchased by the Campbell family, whose son, William B. Campbell, became the 14th Governor of Tennessee; he later died in the house. It remained in the family; by the 1982, it was owned by his great-granddaughter, Mary Williamson Thomas. It has been listed on the National Register of Historic Places since April 15, 1982.

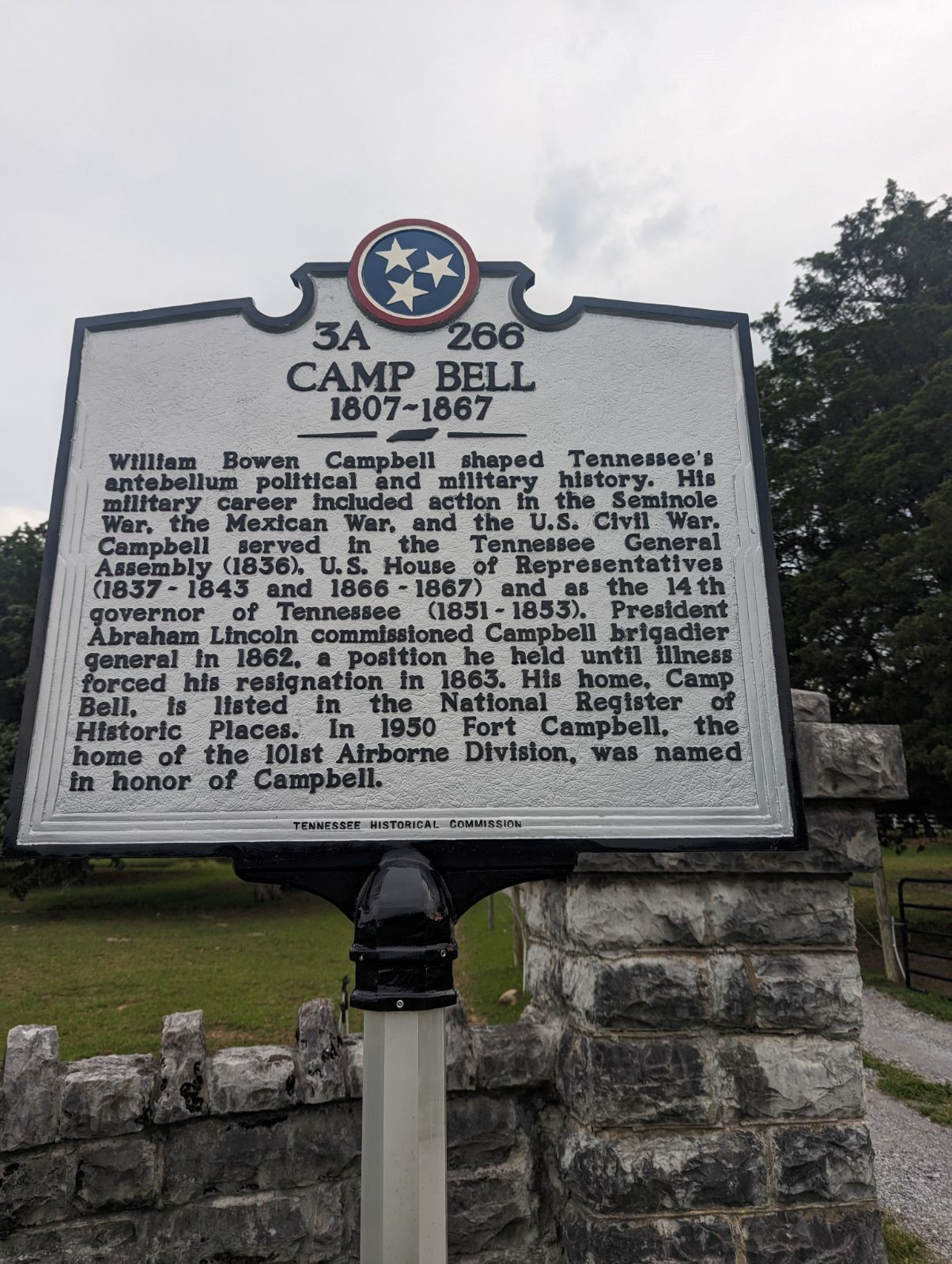
Historical marker at home of Gen. William Bowen Campbell, erected by Tennessee Historical Commission, 2024
