= John Cloyd House =

- U.S. National Register of Historic Places
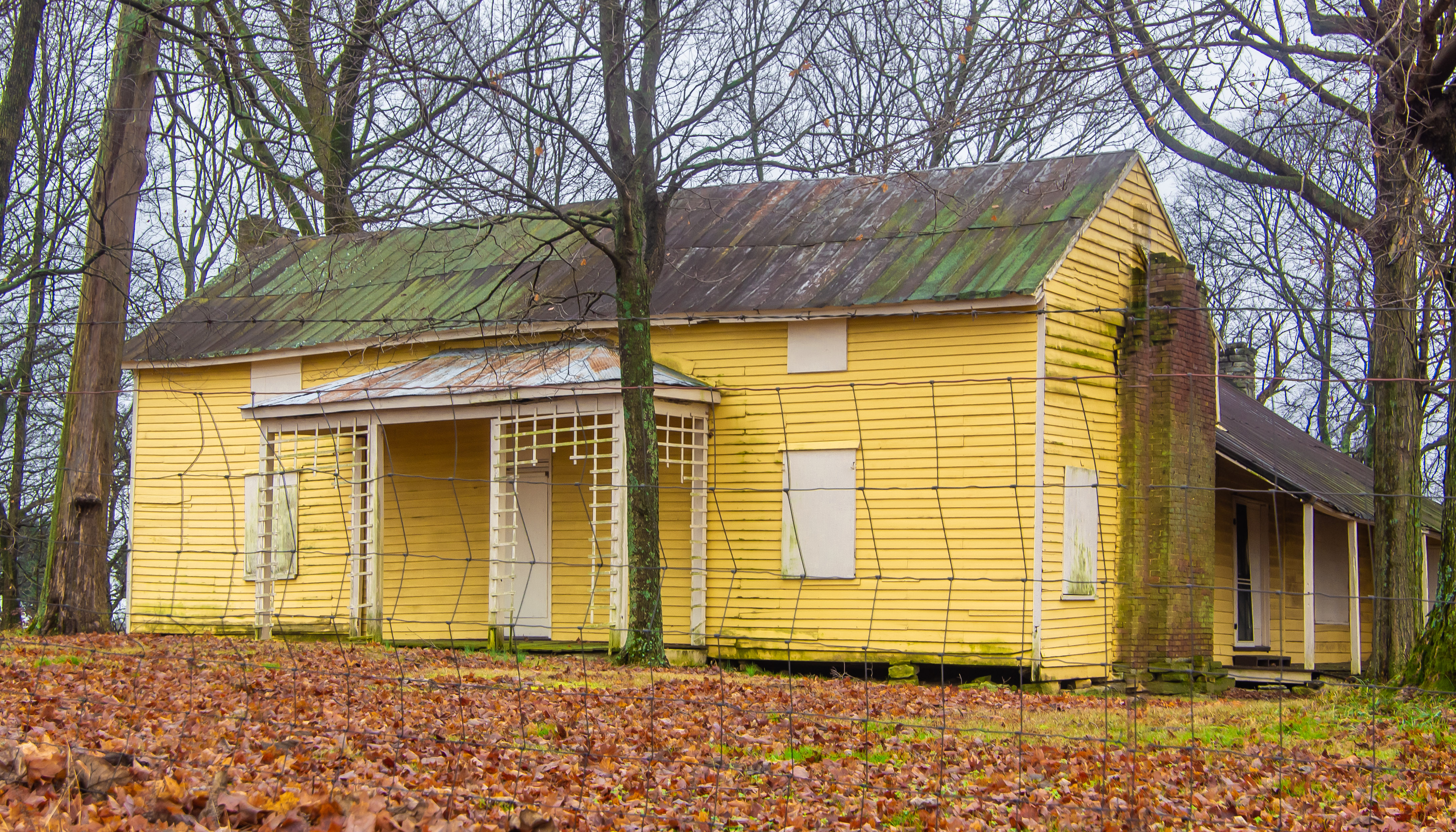

- Location within Tennessee Location within the United States
- Nearest city: Mt. Juliet, Tennessee
- Coordinates: 36°13′15″N 86°34′15″W
- Area: 3 acres (1.2 ha)
- Built: 1791
- NRHP reference No.: 74001931
- Added to NRHP: October 1, 1974

The John Cloyd House is a historic house in Mt. Juliet, Tennessee, U.S.. It was built as a log house in 1791 for Captain John Cloyd, a settler who migrated to Tennessee with Colonel John Donelson. It was inherited by his son, John W. Cloyd, followed by the latter's daughter, Ella Cloyd Ligon. By the 1970s, it was owned by her son, Daniel Ligon. However, the original log house is only the front room of the modern-day house. The room includes Captain Cloyd's old bed.

It has been listed on the National Register of Historic Places since October 1, 1974.
