= Rest Hill Cemetery =

Historic cemetery in Lebanon, Wilson County, Tennessee, US

- U.S. National Register of Historic Places
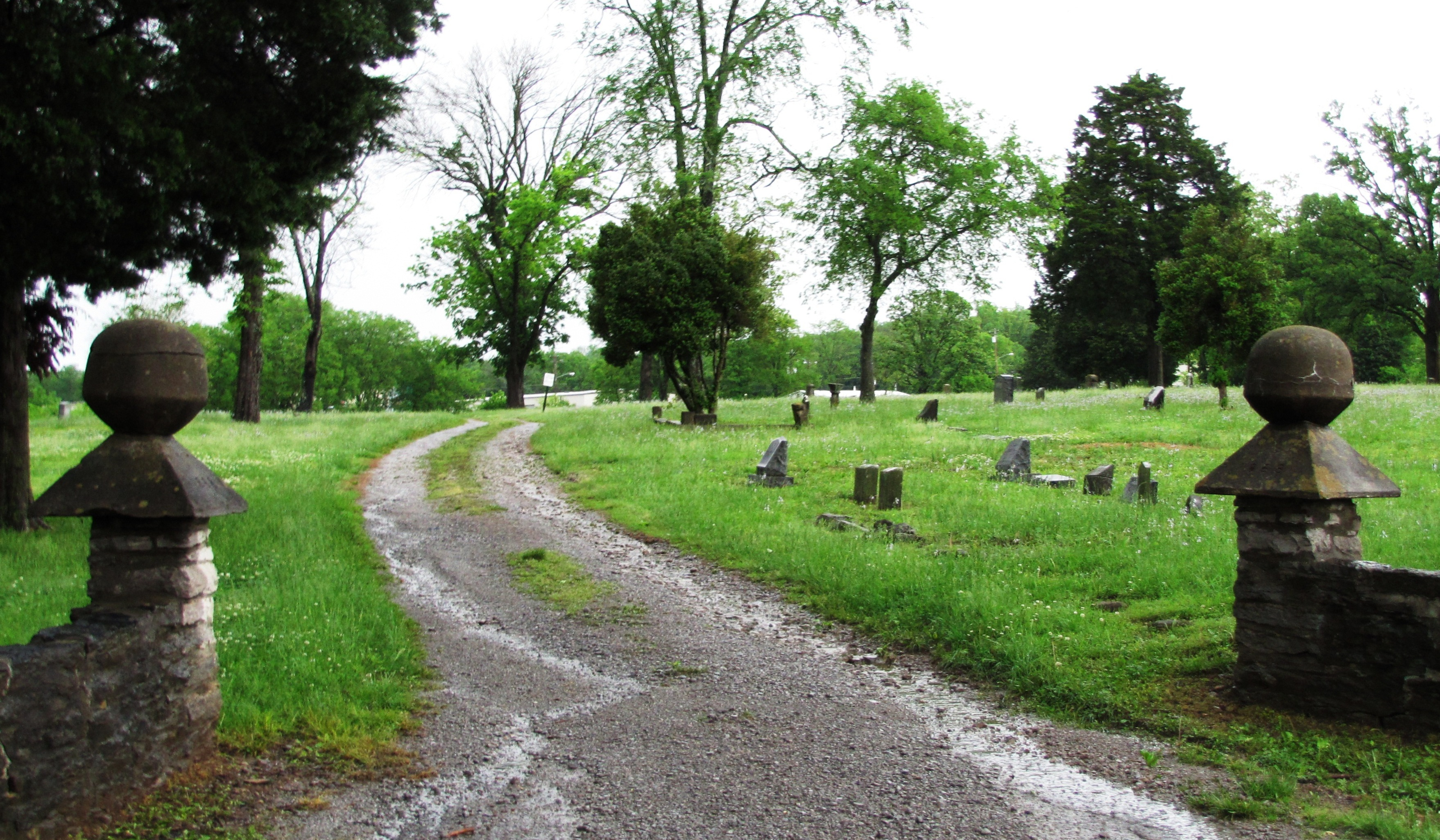

- Location within Tennessee Location within the United States
- Location: TN 141 E of jct. with TN 24 Bypass, Lebanon, Tennessee
- Coordinates: 36°12′37″N 86°16′13″W
- Area: 7.7 acres (3.1 ha)
- Built: 1867
- NRHP reference No.: 93000212
- Added to NRHP: March 25, 1993

Rest Hill Cemetery is an African-American cemetery just to the east of Lebanon, Tennessee.

The cemetery was established with the help of the Freedmen's Bureau in 1867–1869, during the Reconstruction Era. It was expanded in 1880. It includes the burials of at least 25 blacks who were born as slaves, before the Emancipation Proclamation in 1863. There are also civic leaders like J. R. Inman (a co-founder of the Wilson County Colored Teachers Association) and Republican politicians like Jake Owens and Martin Manson, from the postbellum era.

The cemetery has been listed on the National Register of Historic Places since March 25, 1993. By 2002, it was mostly overgrown, and the city of Lebanon agreed to restore it.
