= Ross Winn =

Anarchist writer and publisher (1871-1912)

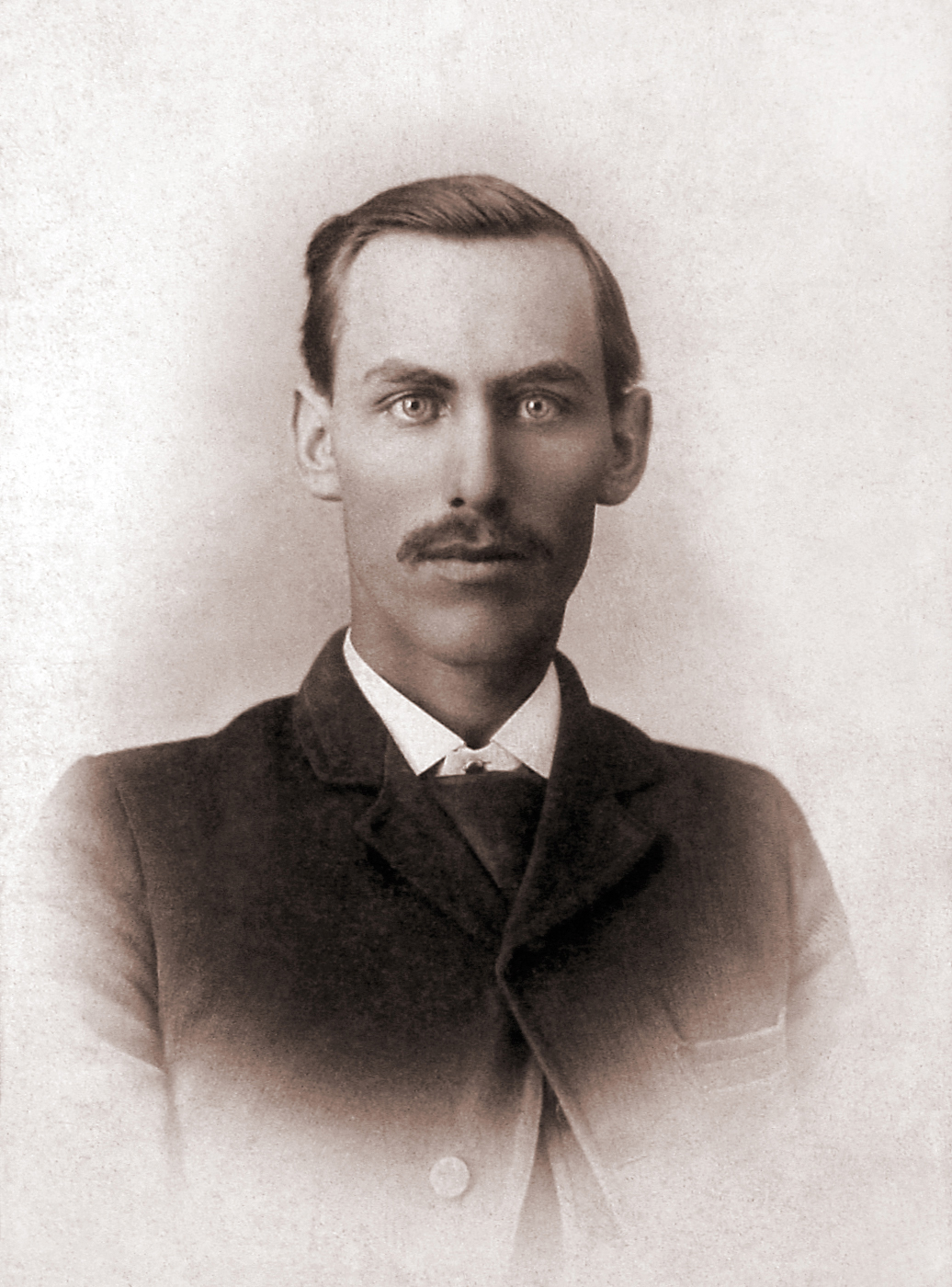
- Winn, circa 1899
- Born: August 25, 1871; Denton County, Texas, U.S.
- Died: August 8, 1912 (aged 40); Mt. Juliet, Tennessee, U.S.

Ross Winn (August 25, 1871 – August 8, 1912) was an American anarchist writer and publisher from Texas who was mostly active within the Southern United States.

== Biography ==
Ross Winn was born in Denton County, Texas in 1871. Prior to beginning his own publishing efforts, Winn frequently wrote articles for other radical papers. Winn's earliest known published writing appears in the January, 1894 issue of Twentieth Century. He was 23 when he wrote the piece, a plea for cooperation between socialists and anarchists. In a later piece, appearing in Free Society in December, 1900, Winn mentions becoming a "young convert" in realizing his own radical political notions twelve years earlier, when he was only 17 years old. It is likely that Winn, like many other anarchists of the time, became politicized by the execution of the Haymarket martyrs. Winn also wrote articles for Discontent: Mother of Progress from Home, Washington, The Firebrand, a short-lived, but renowned weekly out of Portland, Oregon; The Rebel, an anarchist journal published in Boston; and Emma Goldman's Mother Earth.

Sometime in 1894, Winn began his first paper, known as Co-operative Commonwealth. He then edited and published Coming Era for a brief time in 1898 and then Winn's Freelance in 1899. Later in 1899, Winn took over publication of Free Society and discontinued Coming Era and Winn's Freelance. In 1902, he announced a new paper called Winn's Firebrand. It's likely he fancied the name of the then-defunct weekly. His vision was for a paper that would appeal to people of all classes. According to Winn, it would be "just the kind of literature for missionary work among the masses". Winn considered the printed word as the most effective tool for social awakening, and saw the dissemination of anti-authoritarian ideals, especially in the conservative South, as his distinct calling. In 1900, Tennessee became his base of operation: "In establishing the magazine (in Mt. Juliet), as an independent publication, the flag of revolutionary thought is planted on Southern soil, and a residence of a lifetime in this section convinces me that it will be a fruitful field for libertarian ideas, if the right methods are used to present them." Winn and his future wife Augusta "Gussie" Smith moved into her family home in Mt. Juliet, the Warner Price Mumford Smith House.

In 1899, Winn married Augusta Smith, and they soon had their first and only child, Ross Winn, Jr. In 1901, Winn met Emma Goldman in Chicago, and found in her a lasting ally. As she wrote in his obituary, Emma "was deeply impressed with his fervor and complete abandonment to the cause, so unlike most American revolutionists, who love their ease and comfort too well to risk them for their ideals." Winn kept up a correspondence with Goldman throughout his life, as he did with other prominent anarchist writers at the time. Joseph Labadie, a prominent writer and organizer in Michigan, was another friend to Winn, and contributed several pieces to Winn's Firebrand in its later years.

Sometime in 1909, Ross Winn contracted tuberculosis (then known as "consumption"), but continued his work on Firebrand despite his failing health. In 1910, he moved briefly to Texas with his wife, Augusta (known as "Gussie"), in search of work. Unable to find work, and having gotten himself deeper into debt, Winn sold his printing setup and moved back to Mt. Juliet.

In July 1911, Gussie wrote a letter, in secret, to Emma Goldman asking for any possible financial assistance from their allies, knowing that her husband "would rather starve than to beg". Word was sent out around the country and, all told, some $60 was raised, quite a sum for a small family at that time. Rather than spending the money on himself or his family, however, Winn spent the majority of the money on a new printing setup and began what was to be his last paper, known as The Advance. On August 8, 1912, the degenerative infection of tuberculosis finally took Winn's life. He was still setting type on the August issue of The Advance the day before he died.
