= Lebanon Woolen Mills =

- U.S. National Register of Historic Places
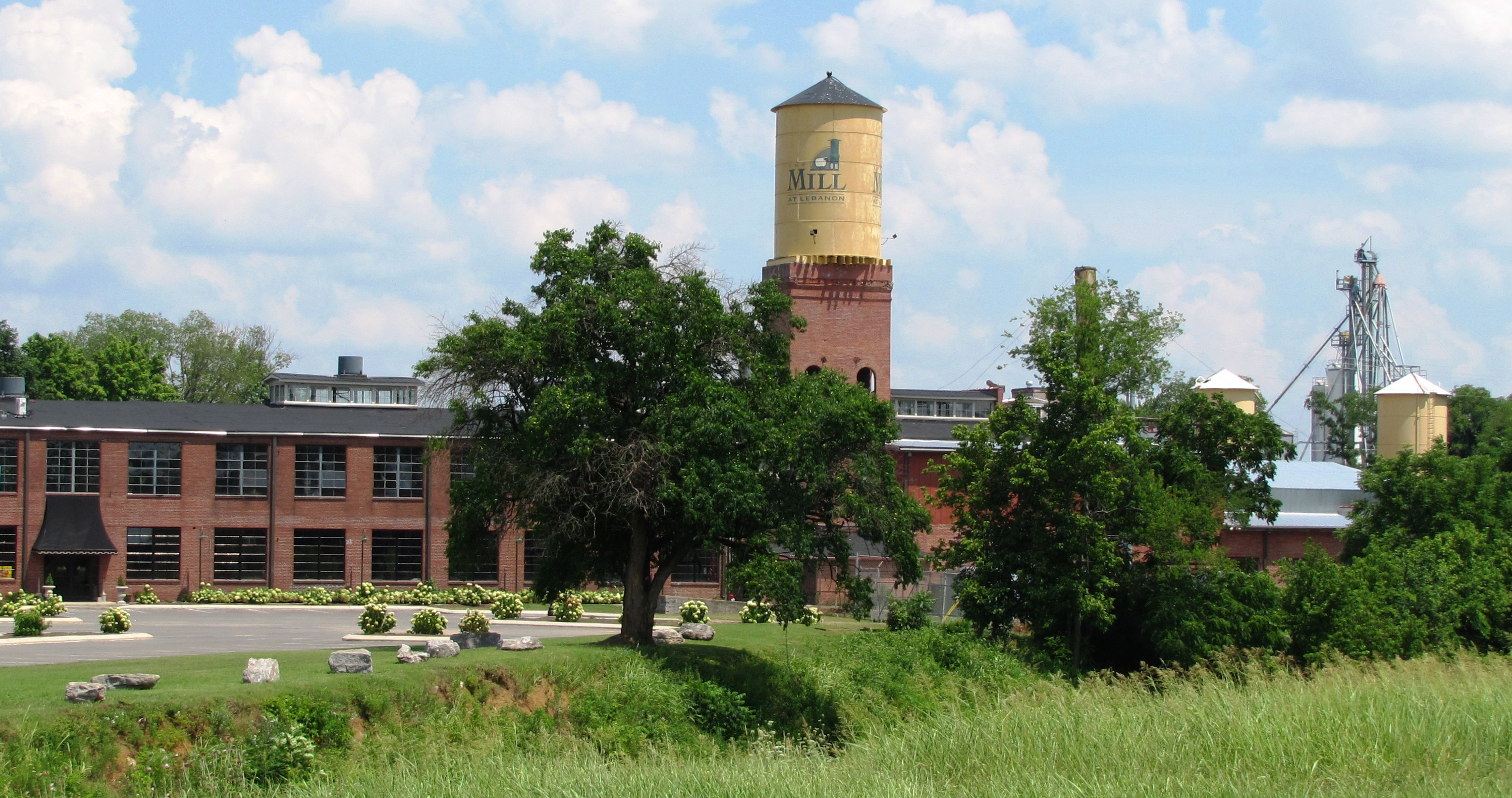

- Location within Tennessee
- Location: 218 North Maple Street, Lebanon, Tennessee
- Coordinates: 36°12′33″N 86°17′37″W
- Area: 11 acres (4.5 ha)
- Built: 1909
- Architectural style: Colonial Revival, Industrial
- NRHP reference No.: 07000687
- Added to NRHP: July 12, 2007

The Lebanon Woolen Mills, now the Mill at Lebanon, are historic industrial buildings in Lebanon, Tennessee, U.S. They were built in 1909 by Dr Howard K. Edgerton. The facility was inherited by John Edgerton, who served as its president from 1914 to 1938. Edgerton was vehemently opposed to labor unions, and strongly in favor of open shops. The facility closed down in 1998.

The buildings were designed by Francis B. Warfield & Associates in the Colonial Revival architectural style. They have been listed on the National Register of Historic Places since July 12, 2007.
