= Robert H. Hatton =

American politician (1826 – 1862)

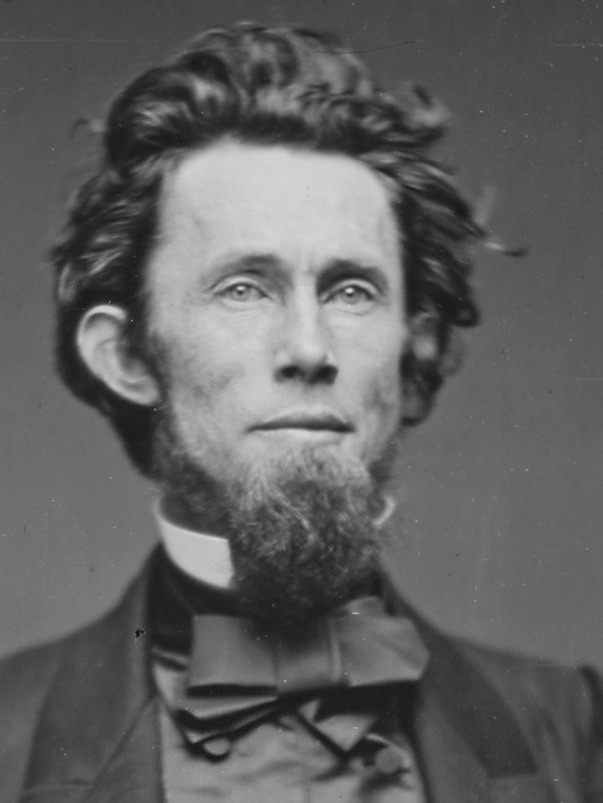

Member of the U.S. House of Representatives from Tennessee's 5th district
- In office March 4, 1859 – March 3, 1861
- Preceded by: Charles Ready
- Succeeded by: William B. Campbell (1866)

Member of the Tennessee House of Representatives from Wilson County
- In office October 1, 1855 – October 5, 1857

Personal details
- Born: Robert Hopkins Hatton; November 2, 1826 Steubenville, Ohio
- Died: May 31, 1862 (aged 35) Henrico County, Virginia
- Party: Opposition; Whig
- Education: Cumberland University

Military service
- Allegiance: Confederate States
- Branch/service: Confederate States Army
- Years of service: 1861–1862
- Rank: Brigadier General (not confirmed)
- Battles/wars: American Civil War: Peninsula Campaign; Battle of Seven Pines †

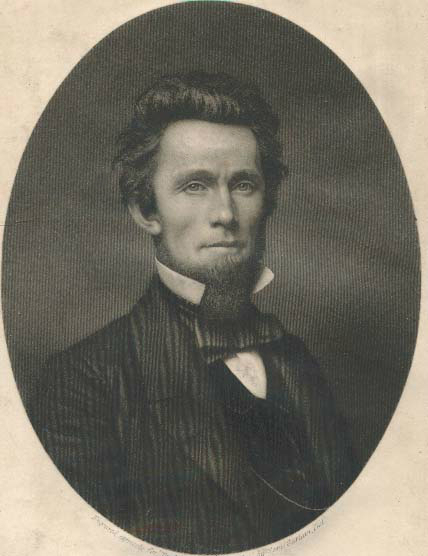
Engraving by Samuel Sartan

Robert Hopkins Hatton (November 2, 1826 – May 31, 1862) was a lawyer and politician from Tennessee. He was a state legislator and US Representative, and a Confederate general during the American Civil War.

== Biography ==
Hatton was born in either Steubenville or Youngstown, Ohio (sources differ). His father, Rev. Robert Clopton Hatton, was a Methodist preacher. Early in his life, in 1842, his family moved to Tennessee. He graduated from Cumberland University, then studied law there at Cumberland School of Law. He established a successful practice in Lebanon, Tennessee, after passing the bar exam in 1850 He joined the Whig Party and was elected to the State Legislature in 1855. He unsuccessfully ran for governor in 1857. In 1858, he was elected US Representative from the 5th District as an Opposition Party candidate (the Whig party had collapsed). In the Thirty-sixth Congress, he served as chairman of the Committee on Expenditures in the Department of the Navy.

Hatton believed that the Union should be preserved and initially opposed secession. However, after President Lincoln called for volunteers to put down rebellion, Hatton became a secessionist. He formed a Confederate military unit, the Lebanon Blues, which became a part of the 7th Tennessee Infantry. Hatton was soon elected as colonel of the regiment, which was sent to western Virginia in July 1861.

In 1862, Hatton and his men were ordered to the Richmond area to oppose the Federal drive on the Confederate capital. During the resulting Peninsula Campaign, Hatton served with distinction, and on May 23, 1862, he was promoted to brigadier general of the 4th Brigade, 1st Division, Army of Northern Virginia; this appointment was not confirmed by the Confederate Congress. Just eight days later, he was shot in the head and killed while leading his Tennessee Brigade at the Battle of Fair Oaks.

His body was returned to Tennessee for burial, but because Middle Tennessee was occupied by Federal troops, he was temporarily buried at Knoxville. On March 23, 1866, he was reburied in Lebanon's Cedar Grove Cemetery. A statue of him was erected in Lebanon's town square in 1912.

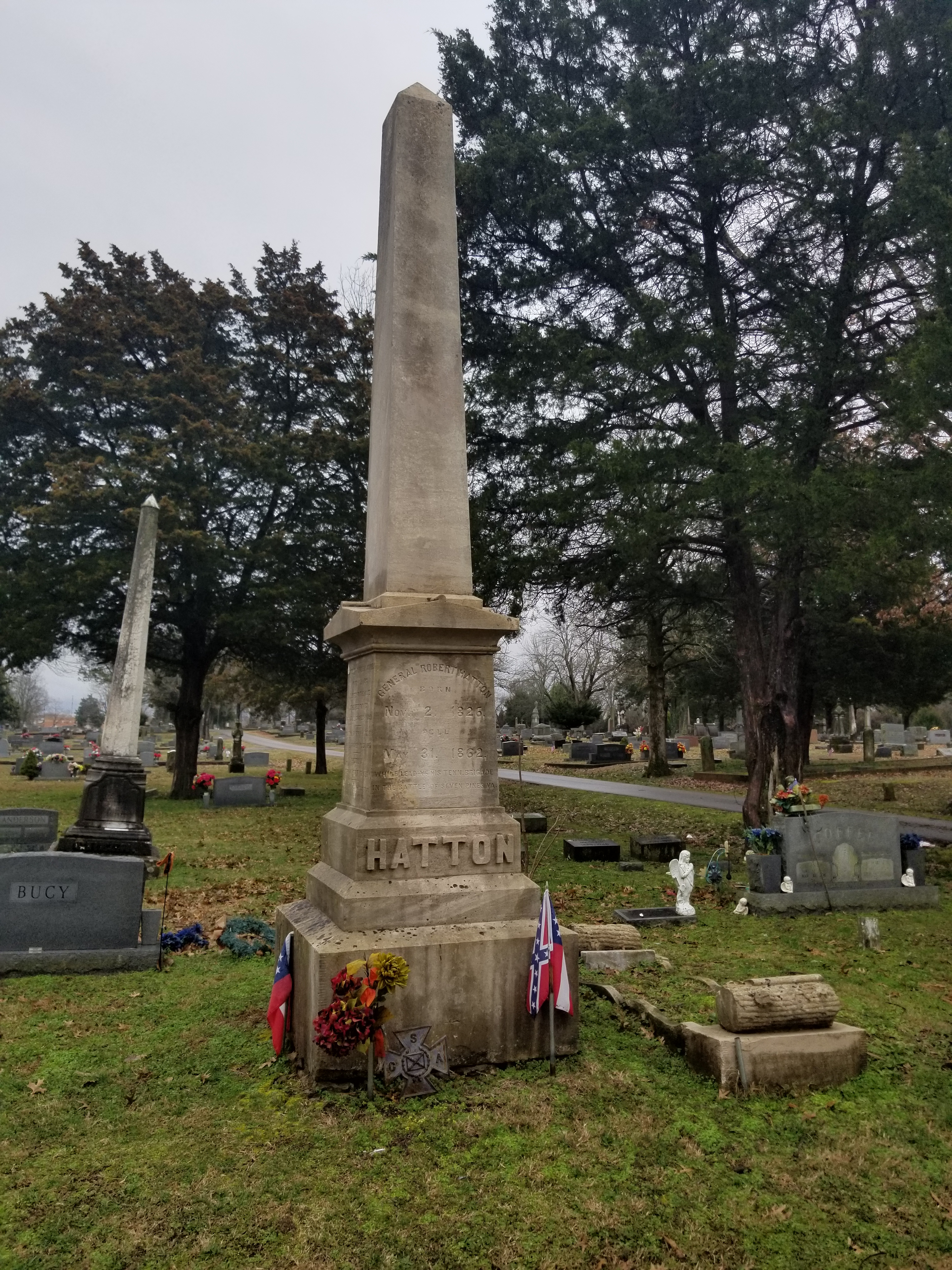
General Robert Hatton's grave marker at Cedar Grove Cemetery in Lebanon, Tennessee.

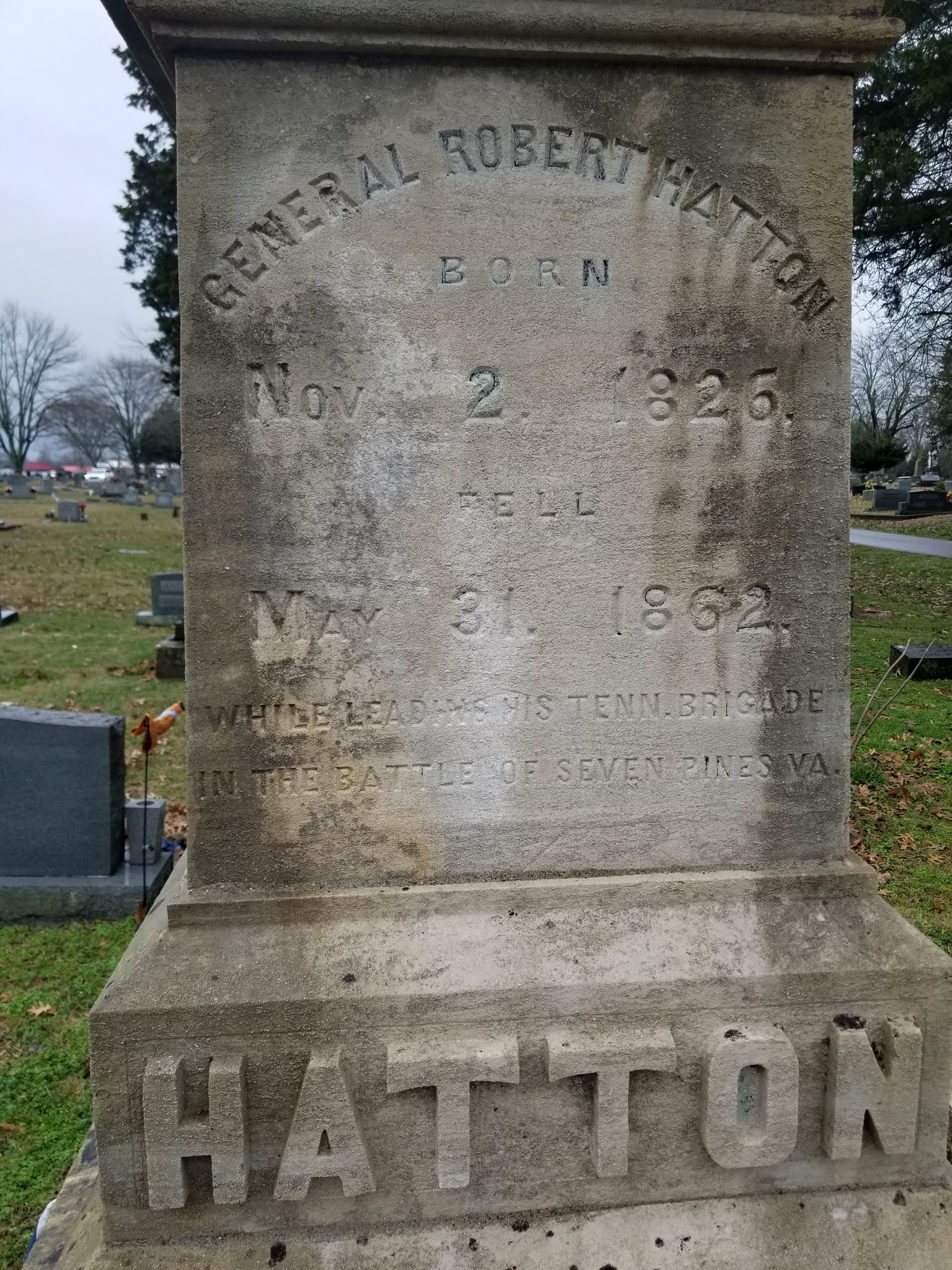
General Hatton's grave marker inscription from the front.

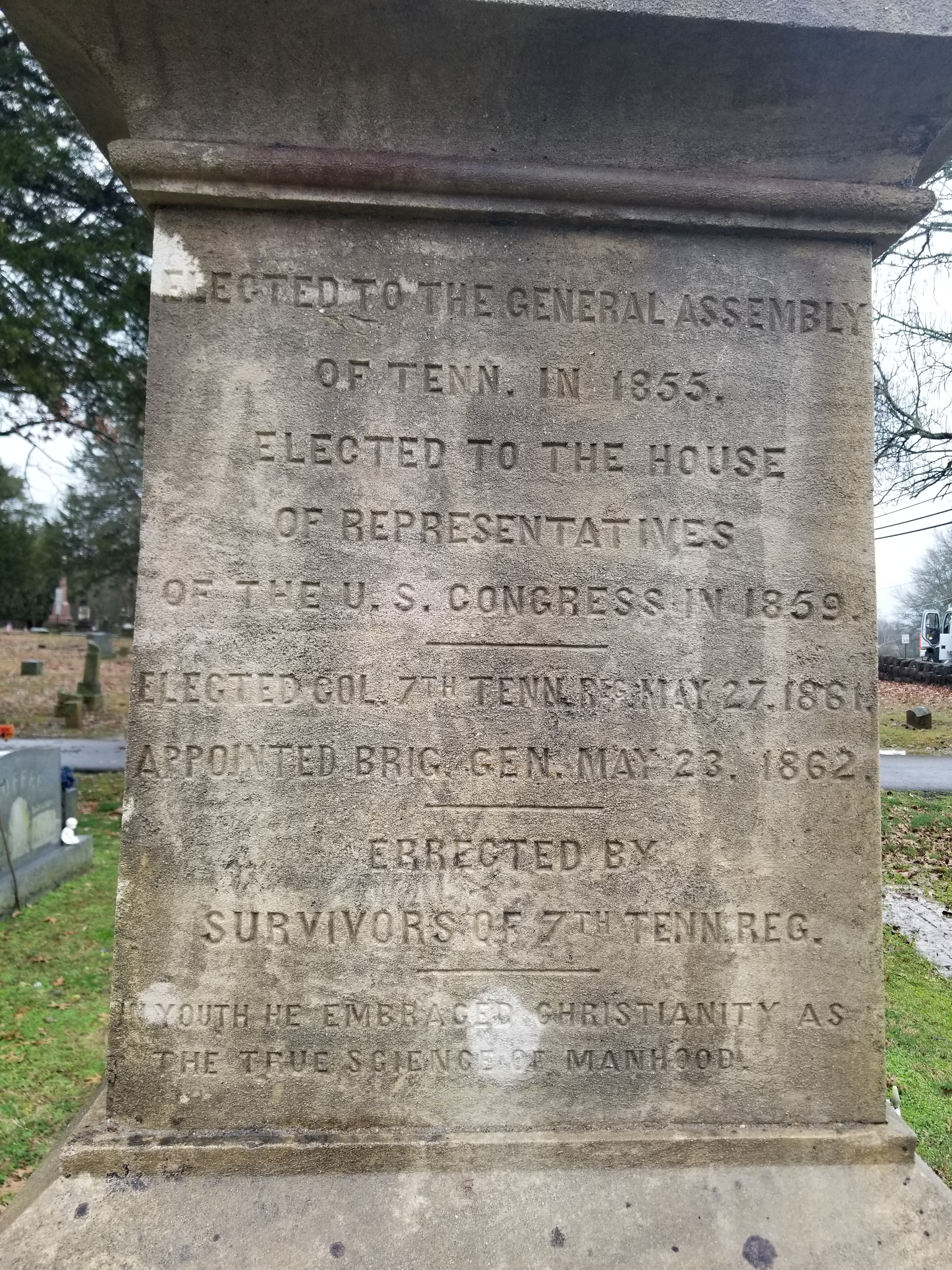

== Honors ==
The Robert H. Hatton Camp #723 of the Sons of Confederate Veterans is named in his memory and honor.

== See also ==
- List of American Civil War generals (Confederate)

Party political offices
First	Know Nothing nominee for Governor of Tennessee; 1857	Succeeded by None
U.S. House of Representatives
Preceded by Charles Ready	Member of the U.S. House of Representatives from Tennessee's 5th congressional district 1859–1861	Succeeded by no delegation, Civil War
