= I.W.P. Buchanan House =

Historic house in Tennessee, United States

- I. W. P. Buchanan House
- U.S. National Register of Historic Places
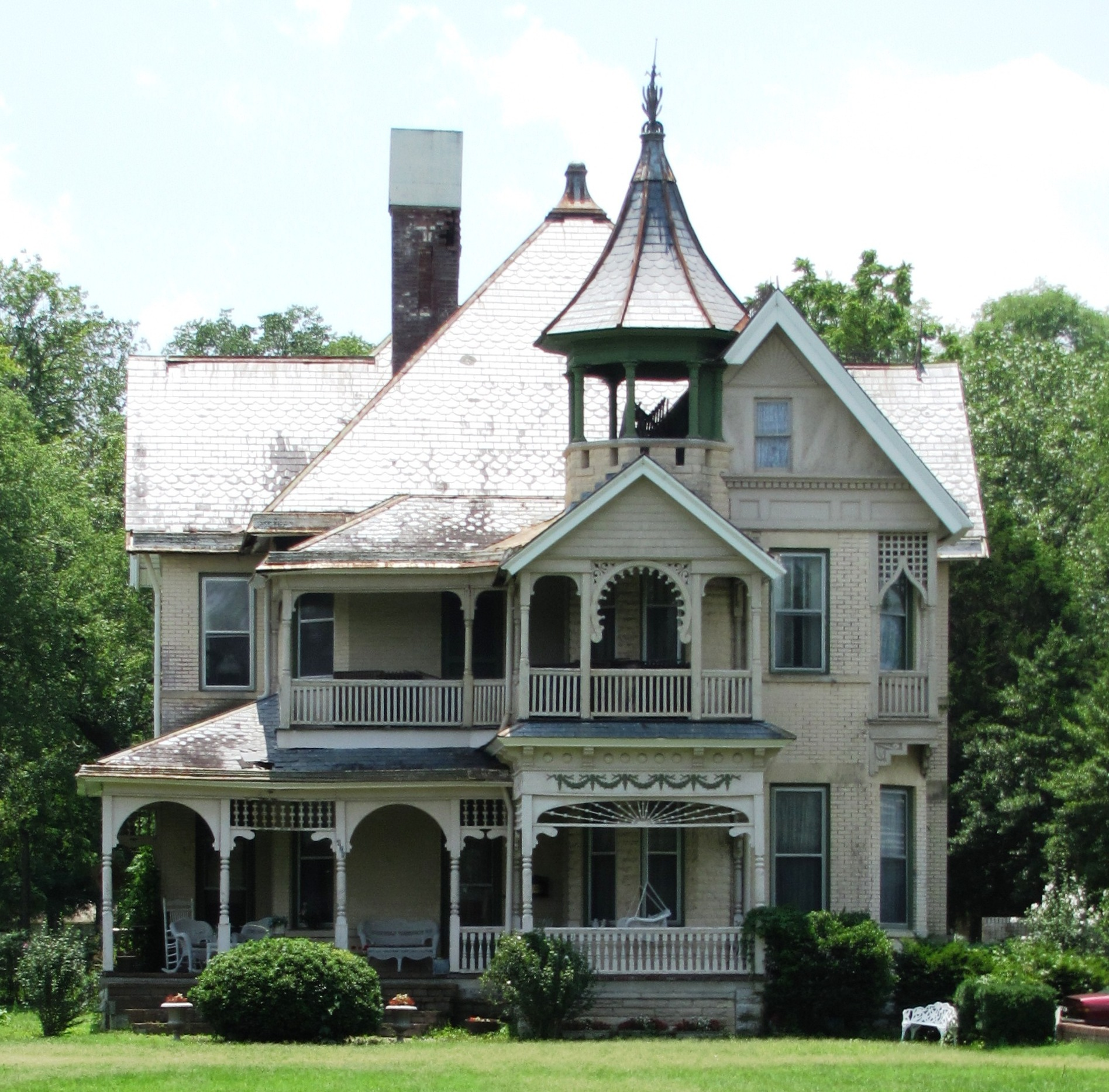
- The I. W. P. Buchanan House in 2010

- Location within Tennessee Location within the United States
- Location: 428 West Main Street, Lebanon, Tennessee
- Coordinates: 36°12′30.6″N 86°18′04.9″W
- Area: 0.7 acres (0.28 ha)
- Built: 1894
- Architectural style: Queen Anne
- NRHP reference No.: 79002487
- Added to NRHP: January 8, 1979

The I.W.P. Buchanan House is a historic house in Lebanon, Tennessee, United States. It was built circa 1894 for Isaac William Pleasant Buchanan, whose father, Dr. Andrew H. Buchanan, was the chair of the Department of Mathematics at Cumberland University. Buchanan himself taught Mathematics at Lincoln College in Illinois and co-founded the Castle Heights Military Academy in Lebanon, where he also taught Mathematics. The house was designed by architect George Franklin Barber in the Queen Anne style. It has been listed on the National Register of Historic Places since January 8, 1979.
