= Granville Smith Crockett =

American politician (born 1799)

Member of the Tennessee House of Representatives from the Rutherford County district
- In office 1835–1837 Serving with Charles Ready

Personal details
- Born: December 24, 1799 probably Kentucky
- Died: c. 1838/1846
- Party: Democratic
- Spouse: Sarah L. Sims (m. 1821)
- Parent: Anthony Crockett (father)
- Occupation: Politician; farmer

Granville Smith Crockett (December 24, 1799 – c. 1838/1846) was an American politician and farmer from Tennessee. He served as a member of the Tennessee House of Representatives from 1835 to 1837. He was a slave owner.

== Early life ==
Granville Smith Crockett was born December 24, 1799, probably in Kentucky to Mary (née Robertson) and Anthony Crockett. His father was a soldier and politician in Virginia and Kentucky. He then moved to Rutherford County, Tennessee around 1816.

== Career ==
Crockett was commissioned as a lieutenant of the 45th regiment on April 16, 1822. He was commissioned captain of the regiment on April 5, 1824. He became captain of the Volunteer Light Infantry Company of the 45th regiment on March 10, 1826. Crockett commanded the Murfreesboro Volunteers as a captain. He later became a captain. Crockett served with his brothers Fontaine Posey Crockett and Overton Washington Crockett at the Battle of New Orleans.

Crockett was a Democrat. Crockett served as a sheriff in Rutherford County from 1834 to 1836. He was a delegate to the Tennessee House of Representatives, representing Rutherford County, from 1835 to 1837 during the 21st General Assembly, alongside Charles Ready. He served as a clerk at the House of Representatives in 1839 and then clerk and master of the chancery court from 1841 to 1842. In 1845, Crockett sought an appointment as counsel at Tangier from President James K. Polk, but was unsuccessful.

Crockett was a slave owner in the 1830s and 1840s. He also farmed in Murfreesboro.

== Personal life ==
Crockett married Sarah L. "Sally" Sims on May 16, 1821. They lived in Barfield, Tennessee. After his death, his wife married Henry Hall.

Crockett died around 1838 or 1846. A gravestone with his name was discovered at the state capitol in 1907 with a death date of December 4, 1846, inscribed.
