= Cedar Grove Cemetery (Lebanon, Tennessee) =

Historic cemetery in Wilson County, Tennessee

- Interactive map of Cedar Grove Cemetery

Details
- Established: 1846
- Location: Lebanon, Tennessee
- Coordinates: 36.1933811°N 86.2974861°W
- Size: 34.6 acres (14.0 ha)

Cedar Grove Cemetery is a historic cemetery located in Lebanon, Tennessee, and owned by the city government.

The land was purchased by the City of Lebanon in 1846. However, the first mention of a city cemetery was in the year 1823. Prior to this location, the cemetery was situated on the parcel of land that held the College Street Church of Christ (which now has been converted into Wilson County Offices). Cedar Grove Cemetery has grown to contain approximately 34.6 acres (140,000 m^{2}), of which 11 acres (45,000 m^{2}) remain undeveloped as of 2007.

Many of the early leaders of Middle Tennessee and Cumberland University are buried here, including some 130 Confederate war dead and veterans. U.S. Representatives Robert Allen, Robert L. Caruthers, Edward Isaac Golladay, Robert Hatton, and Haywood Yancey Riddle are buried there, as is former Tennessee Governor William Bowen Campbell.
