= Ida New and William Madison Turner Farm =

- Turner, Ida New and William Madison, Farm
- U.S. National Register of Historic Places
- Nearest city: Lebanon, Tennessee
- Area: 280.8 acres (113.6 ha)
- Built: 1914
- Architectural style: American Foursquare
- MPS: Historic Family Farms in Middle Tennessee MPS
- NRHP reference No.: 95001275
- Added to NRHP: November 7, 1995

The Ida New and William Madison Turner Farm is a historic farmhouse in Wilson County, Tennessee, southwest of Lebanon. It was built in 1913-1914 for Ian New and William Madison Turner on land they purchased from Eula and Jep Lain. The fence was completed circa 1920. There are several other buildings on the farm, including a chicken coop built in 1960, a smokehouse and a washhouse. The farm was taken over by their son Van New Turner in 1941, although his mother continued to live on the property until her death in 1950. Turner lived here with his wife, Nancy Moore. By the 1990s, it belonged to Anne Turner Overton, one of their descendants.

The main farmhouse was designed in the American Foursquare architectural style. It has been listed on the National Register of Historic Places since November 7, 1995.
