= William Washington Seay House =

Historic house in Tennessee

- U.S. National Register of Historic Places
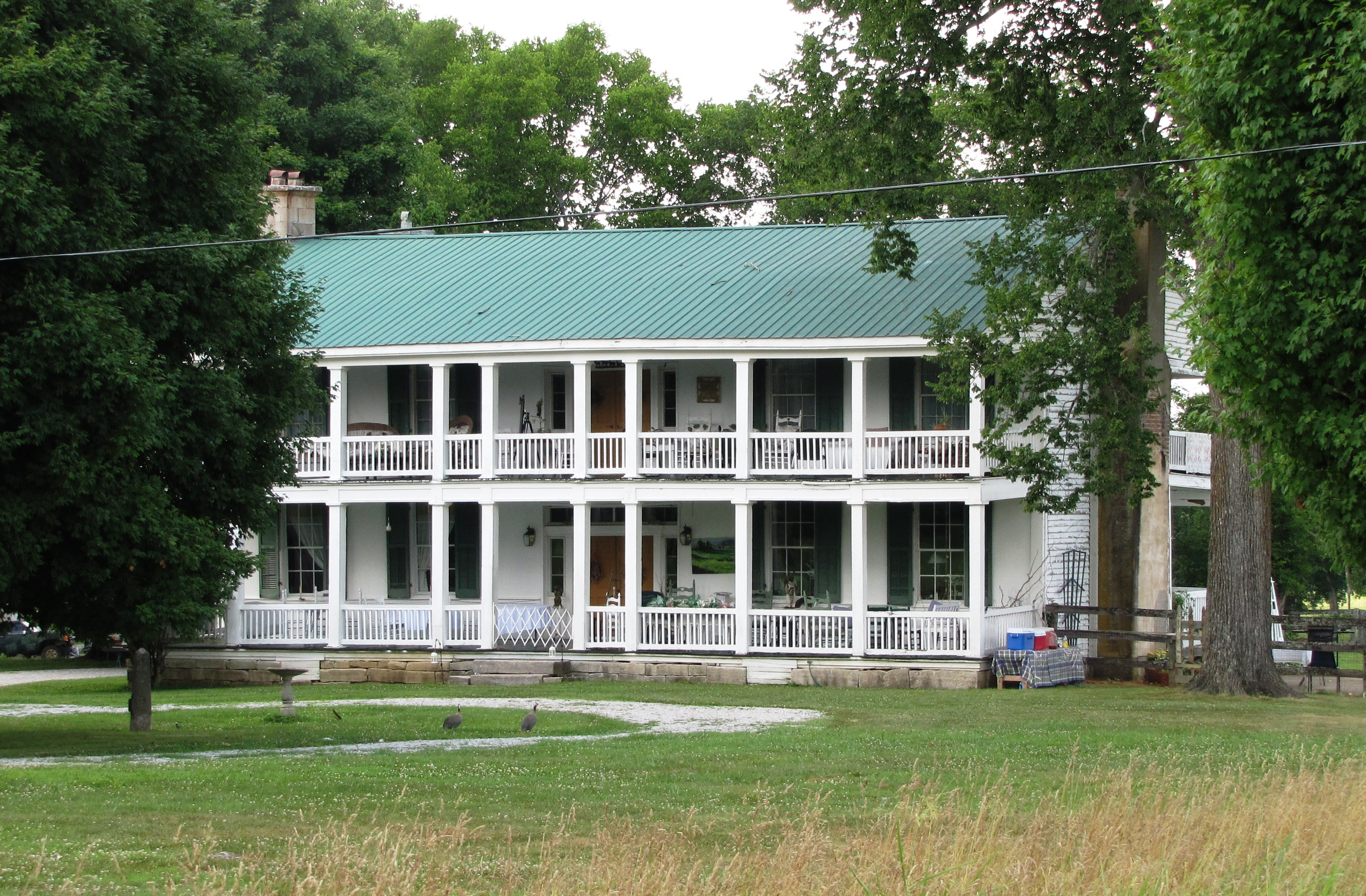
- The William Washington Seay House in 2010

- Location within Tennessee Location within the United States
- Nearest city: Flat Rock, Tennessee
- Area: 17.2 acres (7.0 ha)
- Built: 1835
- Architectural style: I-House
- NRHP reference No.: 95001044
- Added to NRHP: August 25, 1995

The William Washington Seay House is a historic house in Wilson County, Tennessee. It was built around 1835 for William Washington Seay on a 600-acre (240 ha) tobacco plantation. It has been listed on the National Register of Historic Places since August 25, 1995.
