= Charles Ready =

American politician (1802–1878)

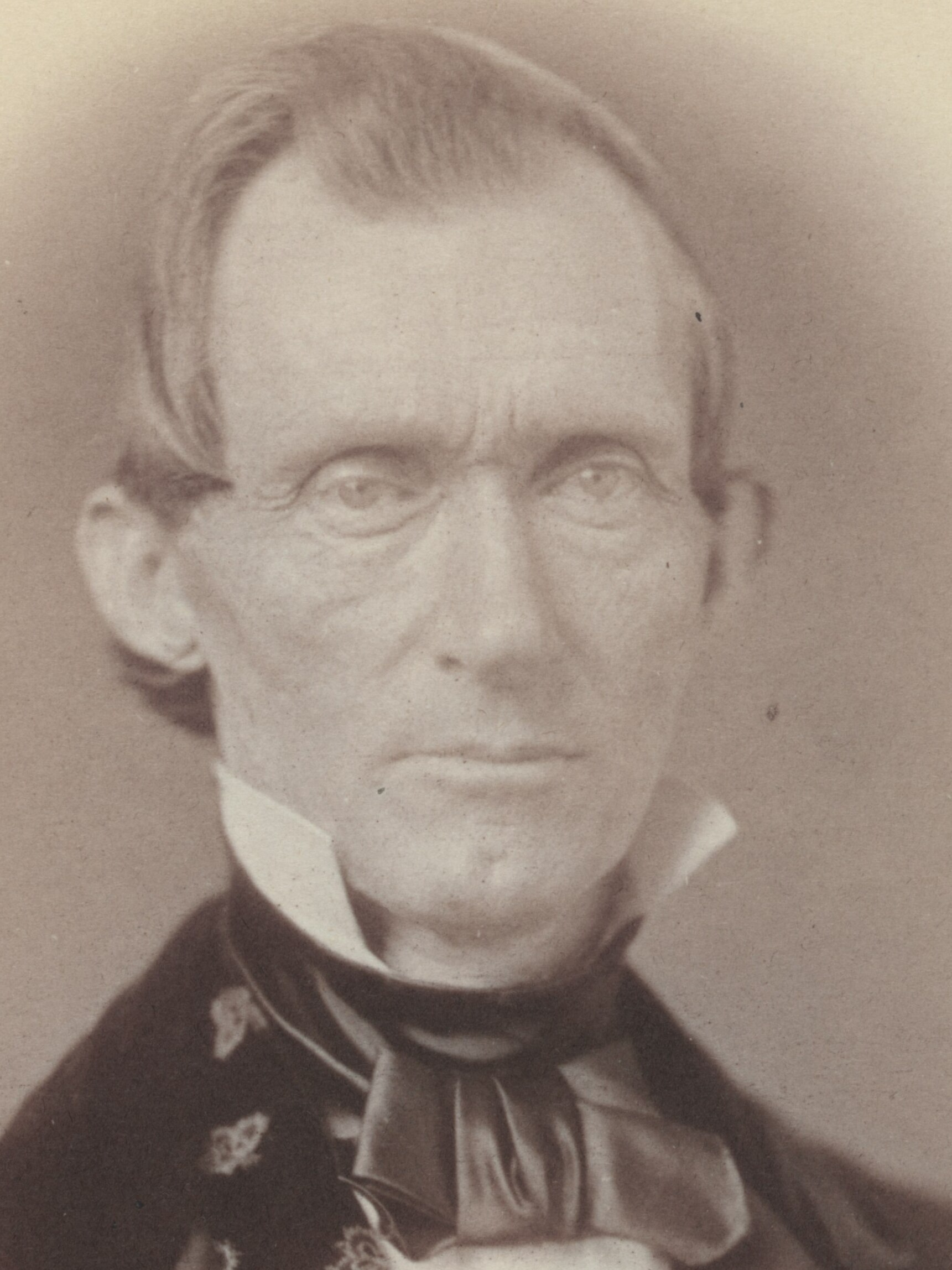

Member of the U.S. House of Representatives from Tennessee's 5th district
- In office March 4, 1853 – March 3, 1859
- Preceded by: George W. Jones
- Succeeded by: Robert H. Hatton

Member of the Tennessee House of Representatives from the Rutherford County district
- In office 1835–1837 Serving with Granville Smith Crockett

Personal details
- Born: December 22, 1802 Readyville, Tennessee, U.S.
- Died: June 4, 1878 (aged 75) Murfreesboro, Tennessee, U.S.
- Resting place: Evergreen Cemetery
- Party: Whig; American Party
- Spouse: Martha Alvoid Strong Ready
- Children: Charles E. Ready; Aaron R. Ready; Mary Emma Ready Cheatham; Charles E. Horace Ready; Martha Ready Williamson; Cora Alice Ready; Ella Love Ready Jordan
- Education: Greeneville College
- Occupation: Politician; lawyer

Charles Ready (December 22, 1802 – June 4, 1878) was an American politician and a member of the United States House of Representatives for Tennessee's 5th congressional district.

== Biography ==
Ready was born in Readyville in Rutherford County, now called Cannon County, on December 22, 1802. He attended the common schools and graduated from Greeneville College (now Tusculum University) in Tennessee. He studied law, was admitted to the bar in 1825, and commenced practice in Murfreesboro, Tennessee. He was married to Martha Alvoid Strong on May 19, 1825 in Knoxville, Tennessee. Their offspring were:

- Charles
- Aaron
- Mary Emma
- Horace
- Martha (Mattie) (1840-1887); she married Brigadier General John Hunt Morgan as his second wife – only one of their two daughters reached adulthood yet died soon after marriage; she married secondly on 31 January 1873 in Rutherford, Tennessee, to William Henry Williamson (1828-1887), and had five children:
  - William Henry Williamson (b. 1873), m. Mary Ready Weaver
  - Martha Ready Williamson (b. 1874), m. Winstead P. Bone
  - Charles Ready Williamson (b. 1876)
  - Alice Martin Williamson (b. 1878), m. Amzi W. Hooker
  - Nannie Williamson (1881-1883)
- (Cora) Alice
- Ella Love

== Career ==
In 1835, Ready was a member of the Tennessee House of Representatives, representing Rutherford County, alongside Granville Smith Crockett. He was elected as a Whig to the Thirty-third Congress and re-elected as a member of the American Party to the Thirty-fourth and Thirty-fifth Congresses. He served from March 4, 1853 to March 3, 1859. He was an unsuccessful candidate for re-election in 1858 to the Thirty-sixth Congress, and resumed the practice of law.

== Death ==
Ready died in Murfreesboro, Tennessee on June 4, 1878. He is buried at Evergreen Cemetery.

U.S. House of Representatives
Preceded by George W. Jones	Member of the U.S. House of Representatives from Tennessee's 5th congressional district 1853-1859	Succeeded by Robert H. Hatton
