= Fite-Fessenden House =

Historic house in Tennessee, United States

- U.S. National Register of Historic Places
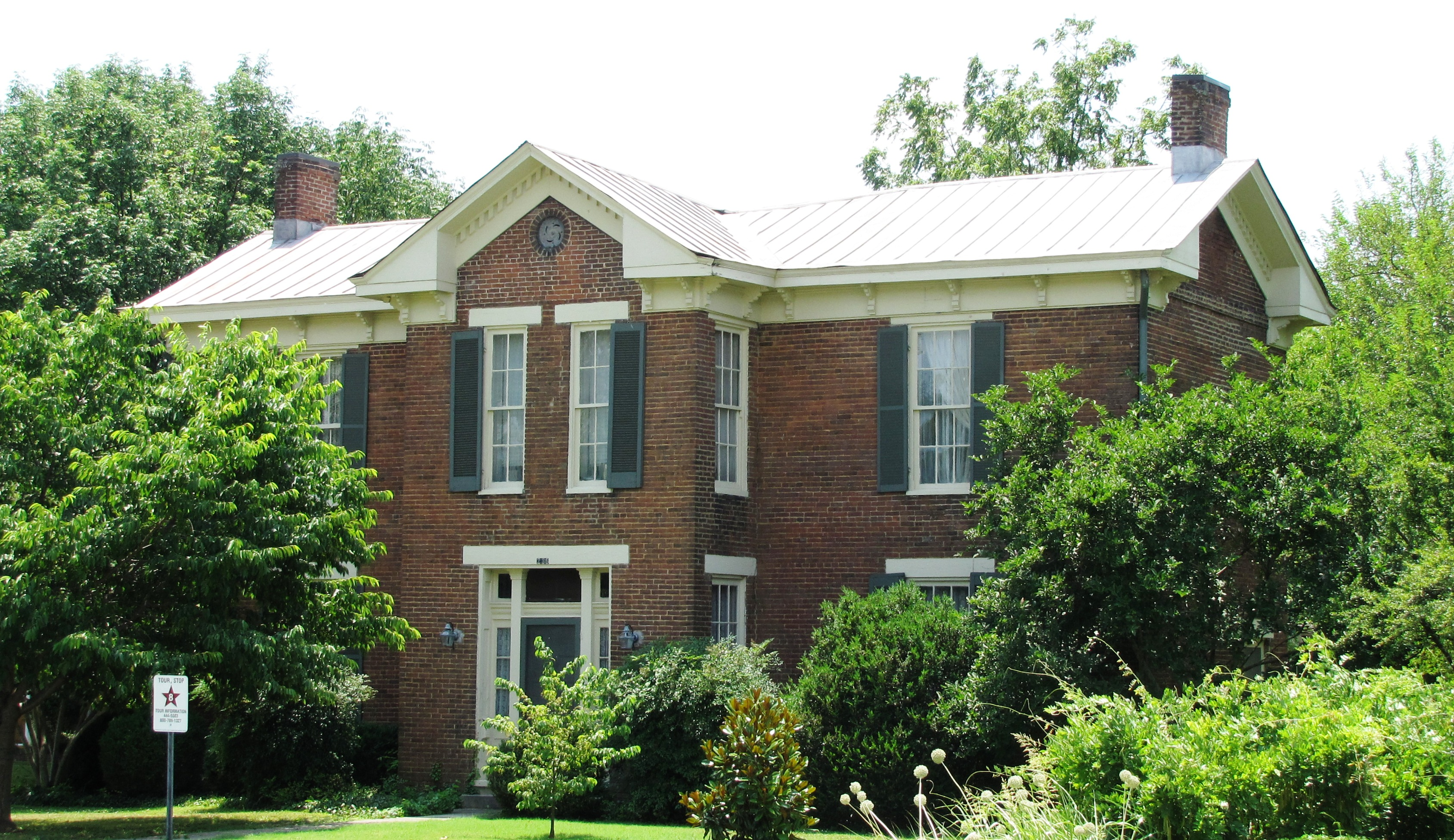
- The Fite-Fessenden House in 2010

- Location within Tennessee Location within the United States
- Location: 236 West Main Street, Lebanon, Tennessee
- Coordinates: 36°12′30″N 86°17′42″W
- Area: 1 acre (0.40 ha)
- Architectural style: Greek Revival, Italianate
- NRHP reference No.: 85001488
- Added to NRHP: July 5, 1985

The Fite-Fessenden House is a historic house in Lebanon, Tennessee, U.S.. It is now home to the Wilson County Museum.

== History ==
Construction on the house began in 1852. It was built for Dr James Leonidas Fite, a surgeon who went on to serve in the Confederate States Army during the American Civil War. After the war, his daughter Margaret Harsh founded a private all-girl school in the house known as the Alberta School.

In 1921, the house was purchased by Mr Fessenden, the owner of the Fessenden Coal Company. It was later inherited by his wife, Sallie Barry Fessenden. After her death, it became the Wilson County Museum.

The house has been listed on the National Register of Historic Places since July 5, 1985.
