= Spring Creek Presbyterian Church =

Historic church in Tennessee, United States

- U.S. National Register of Historic Places
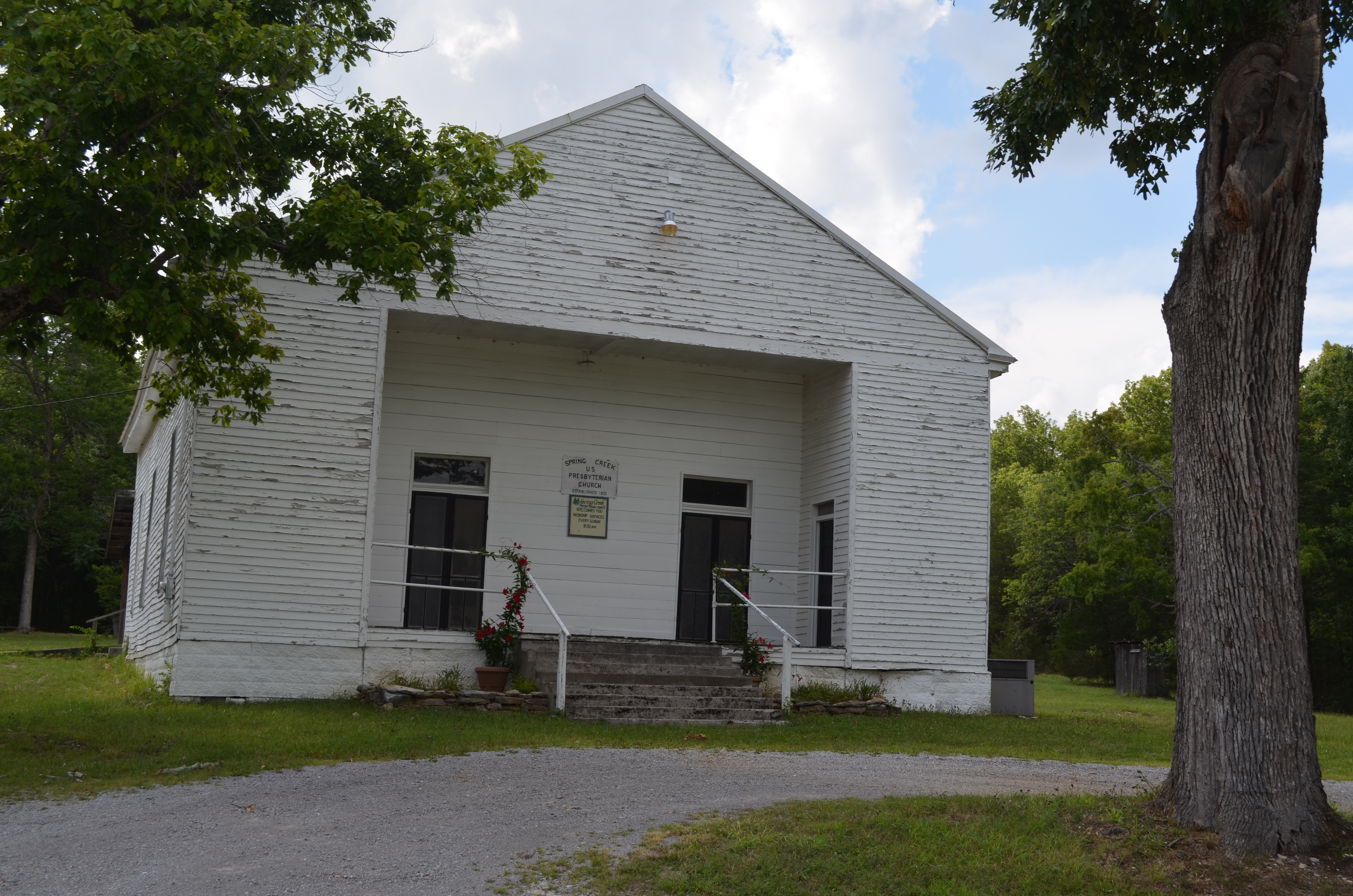

- Location within Tennessee Location within the United States
- Nearest city: Doaks Crossroads, Tennessee
- Coordinates: 36°5′34″N 86°14′20″W
- Area: 3 acres (1.2 ha)
- Architectural style: Greek Revival, Colonial Revival
- NRHP reference No.: 00001356
- Added to NRHP: November 8, 2000

Spring Creek Presbyterian Church is a historic Presbyterian church in Doaks Crossroads, Tennessee.

The building features Greek Revival, Colonial Revival architecture and was added to the National Register of Historic Places in 2000.
