= Hale–Elmore–Seibels House =

Historic house in South Carolina, United States

- U.S. National Register of Historic Places
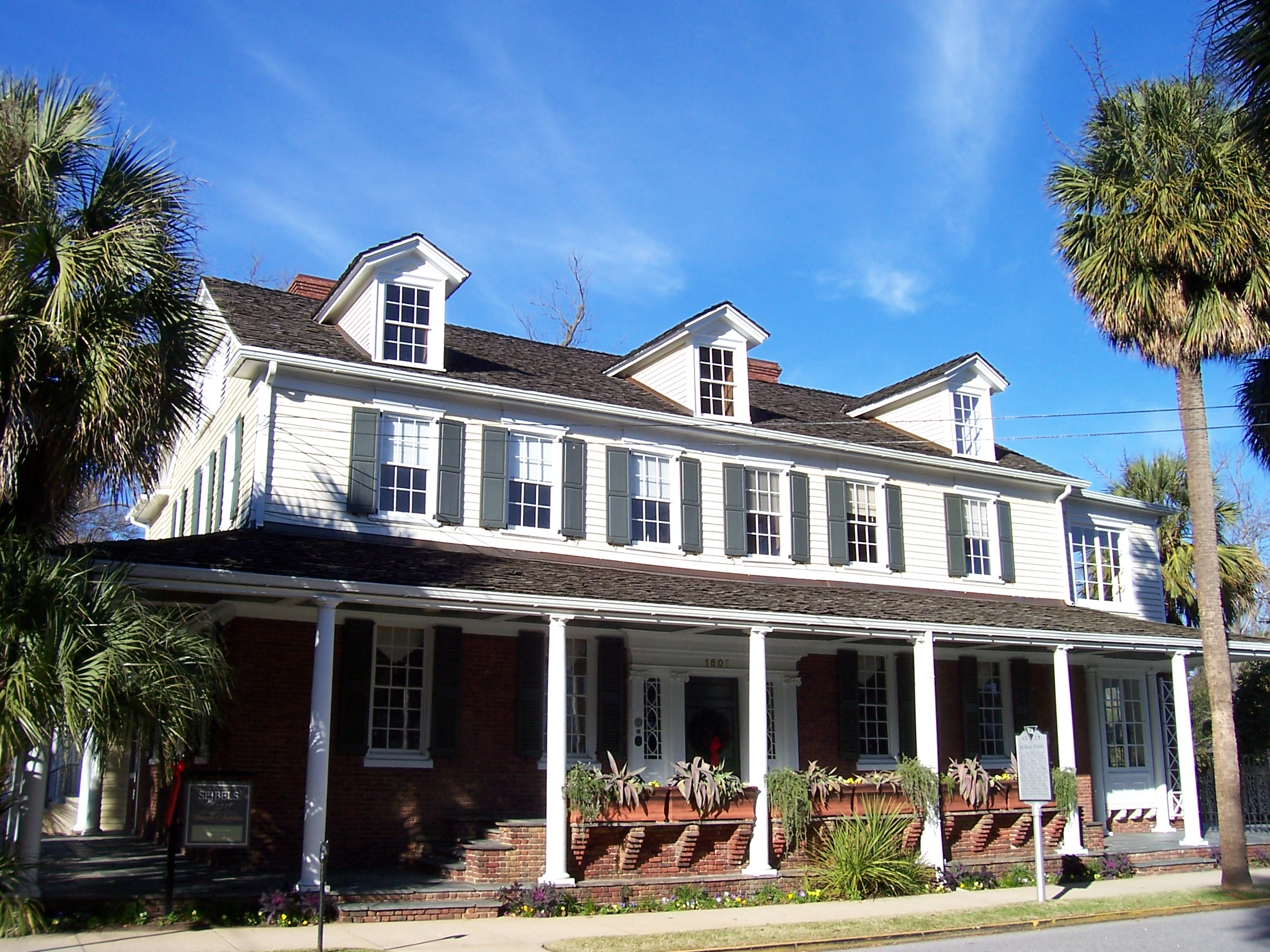

- Location within South Carolina
- Location: Columbia, South Carolina
- Coordinates: 34°0′46.3″N 81°1′52″W
- Area: 0.5 acres (0.20 ha)
- Built: 1790s
- Architect: A. M. Hale
- Architectural style: Georgian
- NRHP reference No.: 71000804
- Added to NRHP: May 6, 1971

The Hale–Elmore–Seibels House or Seibels House is a historic building located in Columbia, South Carolina. Records of the exact year of its construction were destroyed in 1865 during the burning of the city by Union soldiers serving under General William Tecumseh Sherman. The best guess for the date of construction stems from a purported "1796" carved into a beam in the basement. Much of the early history of the house is uncertain, but it is thought to be the oldest building in Columbia.

Located at 1601 Richland Street, the house is the headquarters of Historic Columbia, a non-profit organization dedicated to preserving Columbia and Richland County's historic and cultural heritage, and its grounds are open to the public for visitation. Its extensive restored garden serves as the backdrop for wedding receptions and other events.
