= Doaks Crossroads, Tennessee =

- Unincorporated community
- Location within Tennessee Location within the United States
- Coordinates: 36°06′32″N 86°14′37″W
- Country: United States
- State: Tennessee
- County: Wilson
- Elevation: 692 ft (211 m)
- Time zone: UTC-6 (Central (CST))
  - Summer (DST): UTC-5 (CDT)
- Postal code: 37090
- Area code: 615
- GNIS feature ID: 1314951

Doaks Crossroads is an unincorporated community in Wilson County, Tennessee, United States. Doaks Crossroads is located at the junction of Tennessee State Route 265 and Tennessee State Route 266 7.3 miles (11.7 km) south-southeast of Lebanon. The Spring Creek Presbyterian Church, which is listed on the National Register of Historic Places, is located in Doaks Crossroads. Doaks Crossroads is also home to the "40 acre hackerspace" blog, http://www.chickenroadlabs.com/ and the Wilson County Radio League http://www.wilsonradioleague.wordpress.com/
