= Dr. Elizur Hale House =

Historic house in Connecticut, United States

- U.S. National Register of Historic Places
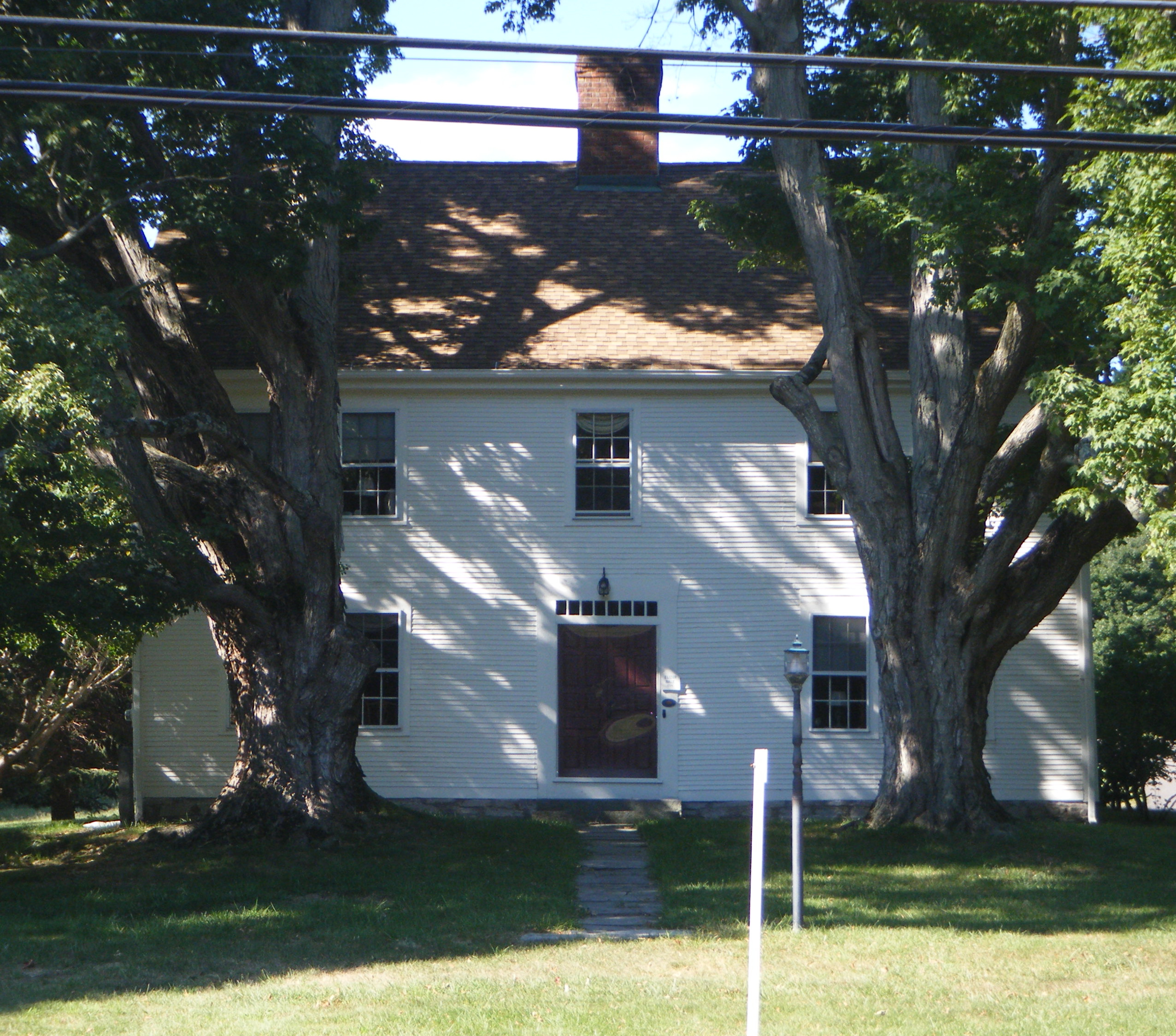

- Location within Connecticut Location within the United States
- Location: 3181 Hebron Avenue; Glastonbury, Connecticut
- Coordinates: 41°42′46.5″N 72°28′0″W
- Area: 4 acres (1.6 ha)
- Built: c. 1780
- NRHP reference No.: 89001088
- Added to NRHP: November 13, 1989

The Dr. Elizur Hale House is a historic house at 3181 Hebron Avenue in Glastonbury, Connecticut. Built about 1780, it is a prominent local example of well-preserved late Georgian domestic architecture. It is also notable for its association with the locally prominent Hale family, who occupied it for 100 years. The house was listed in the National Register of Historic Places in 1989.

== Description ==
The Dr. Elizur Hale House is located in eastern Glastonbury, on the north side of Hebron Avenue (Connecticut Route 94), between Hill Street and Ridge Road. It is a 2 1/2-story wood-frame structure, with a side-gable roof, central chimney, and clapboarded exterior. Its main facade is five bays wide, with a center entrance simply framed and topped by an eight-light transom window. The interior follows a typical center-chimney plan, with a narrow vestibule containing a winding staircase, and parlor spaces to either side. The original kitchen extends behind the chimney, with small rooms at the rear corners. A 19th-century ell extends to the rear, housing modern amenities.

== Elizur Hale ==
ELizur Hale was the son of Captain Jonathan Hale and Sarah (Talcott) Hale. He graduated from Yale in 1742. "...having studied medicine, settled in his native town to practice. He died May 27, 1790, after having assiduously performed the duties of his calling forth-four years." He was also involved in the town politically, representing Glastonbury in the general assembly. "He is said to have been dignified though rough exterior, witty and sarcastic, but benevolent and very useful. Family tradition represents him as abundant in kind deeds, and generous in the use of his property as well as in counsel to the needy." He was married to Abigail Hollister on March 23, 1790. Together, they had five sons. His son Elizur was also a doctor in Glastonbury. He died December 6, 1796.

== See also ==
- National Register of Historic Places listings in Hartford County, Connecticut
