= Hale Manor =

Manor house in Isle of Wight, United Kingdom

Coordinates: 50°39′32″N 1°13′58″W

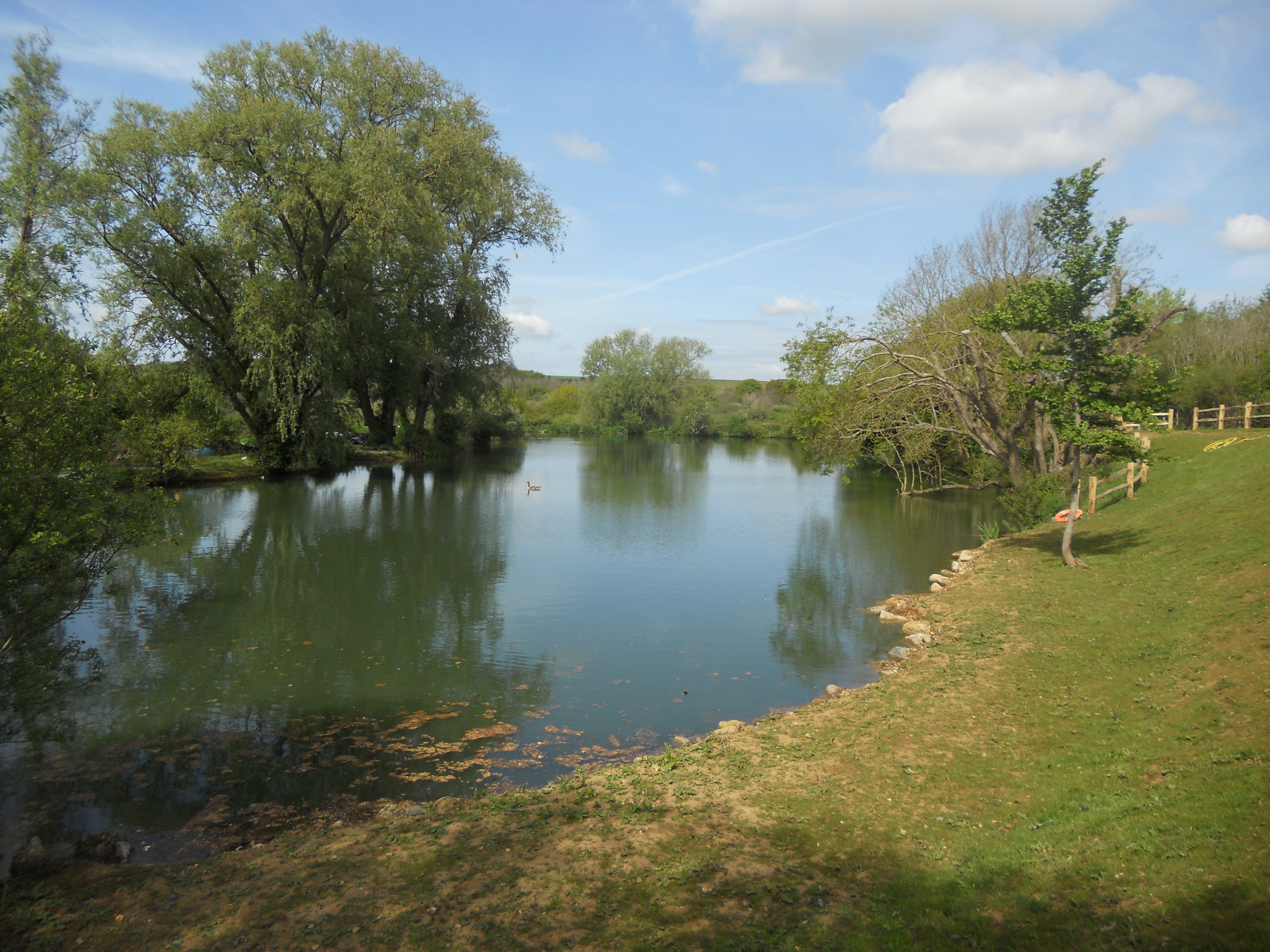
Hale Manor fishing lakes, Isle of Wight, England

Hale Manor (also Atehalle, la Hale) is a manor house on the Isle of Wight, situated in the parish of Arreton. It forms the south-eastern portion of the parish adjoining Newchurch, and comprises the high ground to the south of the River Yar above Horringford.

== History ==
Before the Conquest Godric held the manor of King Edward as an alod. At the time of Domesday, it was held by Nigel of William son of Stur, and the overlordship remained with the lords of Gatcombe until the middle of the 14th century at least.

Under these overlords the manor was held in the reign of Henry III for the service of half a knight's fee by William atte Hale, who died leaving two daughters, Joan and Annora. The manor was then divided into two parts called Northale and Southale, the former being assigned to Annora and the latter to Joan, who was probably the elder daughter, as Northale was subsequently held of Southale, the latter being evidently the more important manor. Southale passed before 1293–4 from Joan to her son William de Goditon, who died in about 1305, leaving a son Robert. Robert was succeeded by a son and grandson of the same name. The last died without issue, and Southale passed to his sister Margery the wife of Adam de Brabason, who successfully established her claim to the overlordship of Northale in 1352.

Northale passed from Annora to her son John Michel, who was succeeded by Henry atte Hale, his son and heir. Richard atte Hale son of Henry died in 1349, leaving a son Robert, a minor, and it was on account of his custody that difficulties arose between Margery de Brabason and the Crown in 1352. This Robert atte Hale, after intruding upon his inheritance 'without due suit and livery,' alienated part of it to Walter Burton and Nicholas Spenser, who had to pay a fine for the trespass.

It was returned in 1428 that the half fee formerly held by Edith atte Hale in Hale did not answer because divided among four tenants, i.e., Thomas atte Hale, Henry Howles, William Facy (or Farsy) and others. In 1431, though the division into Northale and Southale still existed, the two manors are not separately returned, but appear as half a knight's fee at Southale and Northale, held by John Haket of Middleton, John Stour of Sandham and William Facy of Newport.

John Hawles of Upper Wimborne (co. Dors.) sold 'all that our manor called North Hale' in 1548 to William Curle of Arreton, who in a grant of the following year is described as 'of Hale.' In 1652, William Shambler was in possession of the manor, and settled it upon himself and his heirs. By the end of the 16th century the manor had passed to the Oglander family, as Sir John Oglander mentions it as in his possession. It was certainly in the hands of this family at the close of the 18th century. In 1781 a moiety of the manor was in the possession of Betty Smith, and in 1804 Tovey Joliffe and Grace his wife conveyed half the manor to James Clarke. In 1818 the manor was sold by Samuel Twyford to Roger Potts. The property was held in the middle of the 19th century by the family of Hills, from whom it was acquired by Mr. R. Roach Pittis, who still owned it as of 1912. The house has been greatly altered by the substitution of sash windows, but the stone mullions and labels still remain on the west front, and there are traces of ancient work in the offices at the back.
