= Anthony Crockett (soldier) =

American soldier and politician (1754–1838)

- Born: November 19, 1754; Prince Edward County, Colony of Virginia, British America
- Died: December 5, 1838 (aged 84); Frankfort, Kentucky, U.S.
- Burial place: Frankfort Cemetery
- Spouse: Mary Margaret Robertson (m. 1780; died 1818)
- Children: 11, including Granville Smith
- Military career
- Allegiance: United States
- Service years: 1776–1794
- Rank: Colonel
- Units: 7th Virginia Regiment; Illinois Regiment of Virginia
- Conflicts: American Revolutionary War; Battle of the Brandywine; Battle of Saratoga; Battle of Blue Licks; Battle of Piqua; Battle of Chillicothe; Northwest Indian War; War of 1812

Anthony Crockett (November 19, 1754 – December 5, 1838) was an American soldier during the American Revolutionary War, the Northwest Indian War, and the War of 1812. He also served as a Kentucky politician.

== Early life ==
Anthony Crockett was born on November 19, 1754, in Prince Edward County, Virginia, to William Crockett.

His parents died when he was around 10 years old. He then lived with his relative, Samuel Crockett, in Botetourt County, Virginia, until 1776.

== Career ==
In February 1776, Crockett enlisted with Captain Thomas Posey's company of the 7th Virginia Regiment. He served with the 7th from 1776 to 1778, and fought at the Battles of Saratoga and Brandywine. At Saratoga, he gave aid to a wounded General Lafayette. From 1778 to the end of the war, he was a First Lieutenant in the Illinois Regiment of Virginia under George Rogers Clark. He also served with his cousin, Colonel Joseph Crockett. He fought with the regiment in the Battles of Blue Licks, Piqua and Chillicothe. From 1782 to 1794, he was a soldier in the Northwest Indian War.

After his military career, he moved to Mercer County, Kentucky, and served in the Virginia General Assembly in 1790. After, he moved to Franklin County, Kentucky, and served as its representative from 1796 to 1799 in the Kentucky House of Representatives. He also served as the Sergeant-at-Arms of the Kentucky Senate for thirty years.

In his 50s, he served in the War of 1812 under his friend Governor Isaac Shelby as a Brigade Major. Shelby sent Crockett, as an "old Revolutionary soldier of great courage", to Fort Meigs after the Second Siege of Fort Meigs to persuade the troops to remain for sixty more days of service. The battle worn troops could not be persuaded, which pushed Shelby to issue a proclamation on July 13, 1813, for new volunteers.

In 1824, Colonel Crockett and his cousin, Colonel Joseph Crockett, entertained General Lafayette in Kentucky during his 1824–1825 visit to America.

== Personal life ==
Crockett took a leave of absence in 1780 and married Mary Margaret Robertson (1760–1818) of Virginia. Together, they had eleven children, six sons and five daughters:

- Dandridge Spottswood Crockett
- Elizabeth Crockett
- Fontaine Posey Crockett (1797–1837) – soldier at the Battle of New Orleans
- Granville Smith Crockett (1784/1799–1838) – soldier at the Battle of New Orleans, sheriff of Rutherford County, Tennessee, clerk, militiaman, representative of Rutherford County in the 21st Tennessee General Assembly (1835–1837)
- Katherine G. Crockett
- Martha Dillon Crockett
- Mary "Polly" Crockett (1781–1856) – married William B. Hawkins
- Overton Washington Crockett (1791–1864) – soldier at the Battle of New Orleans
- Samuel B. Crockett
- Sarah Crockett
- William R. Crockett

== Death ==
He died on December 5, 1838, in Frankfort, Kentucky. His death was announced on the Kentucky Senate floor on December 7, 1838. He was buried at Benson Churchyard in Franklin County. He was re-interred to a lot dedicated to Revolutionary soldiers at the Frankfort Cemetery in Frankfort, Kentucky on July 4, 1916.
