= Patterson Hotel (Watertown, Tennessee) =

- Hale House-Patterson Hotel
- U.S. National Register of Historic Places
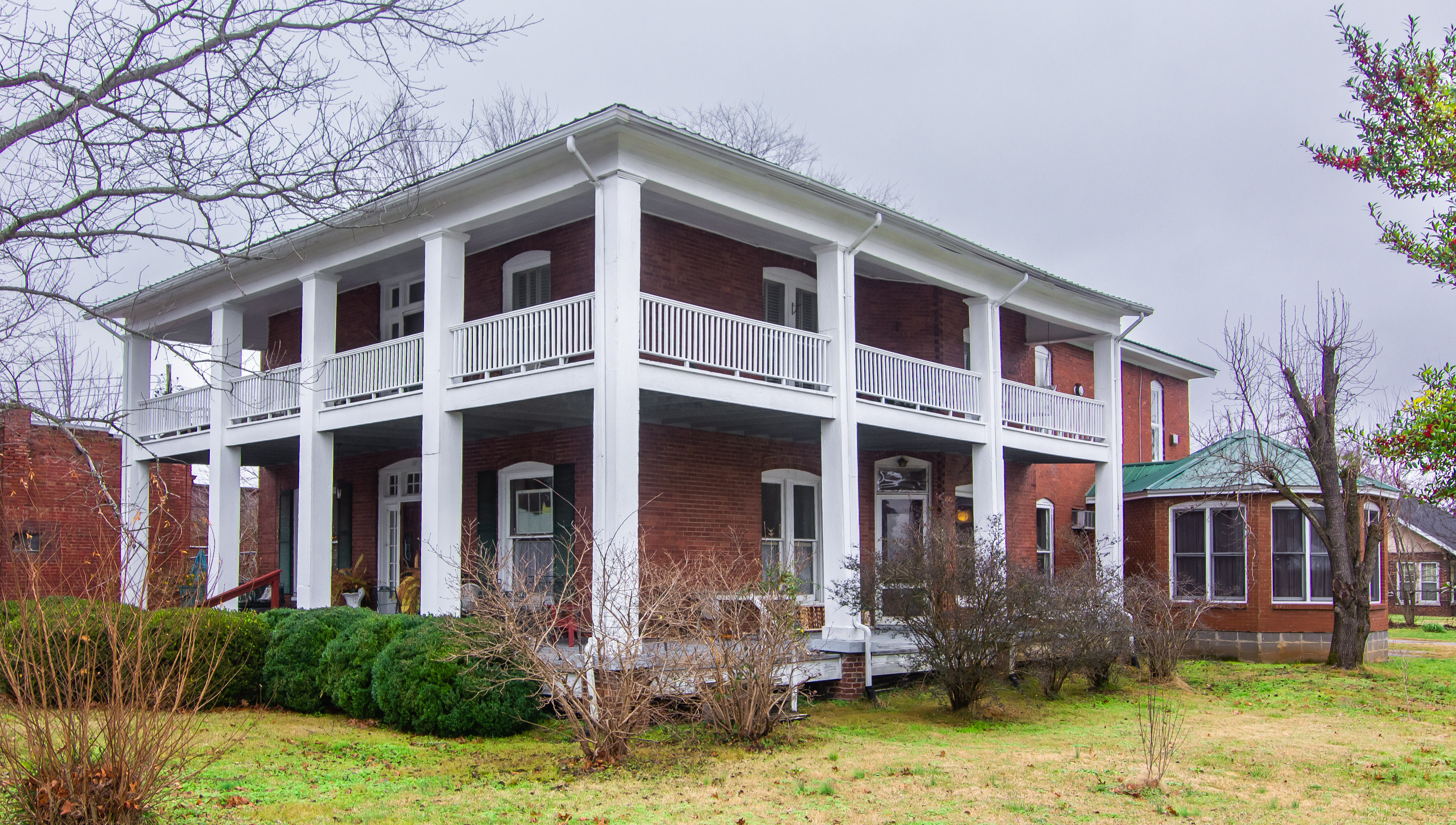

- Location within Tennessee Location within the United States
- Location: 116 Depot St., Watertown, Tennessee
- Coordinates: 36.0993°N 86.1337°W
- Area: 0.4 acres (0.16 ha)
- Built: c. 1898; 1912
- Architectural style: Queen Anne, Classical Revival
- NRHP reference No.: 97000245
- Added to NRHP: March 14, 1997

Patterson Hotel, also known as the Hale House, is a historic building located near the town square in Watertown, Tennessee. The building was added to the National Register of Historic Places in 1997. Completed in 1898, the Hale House originally served as a private residence. In addition, the structure has served as a railroad hotel and boarding house. Currently, the building is privately owned and operated as a bed and breakfast, the Watertown Bed and Breakfast.

Its National Register nomination describes: "Constructed in ca. 1898 and 1912, this frame, red brick veneer, two-story building began as a central hall plan and frame house. The original exterior was weatherboard. In 1912, the brick red veneer was added as well as the classic square columns and the wraparound porch. From this simple Folk Victorian style with Queen Anne influences emerged a Classic Revival hotel, as the bay of the Queen Anne style became the polygonal projection of the Classical Revival. Also, other Queen Anne influences remained in place, including the windows where the large panes of glass are surrounded by smaller panes of glass. Thus, the building is an interesting blend of Queen Anne and Classical Revival elements."
