= William B. Campbell =

American politician (1807–1867)

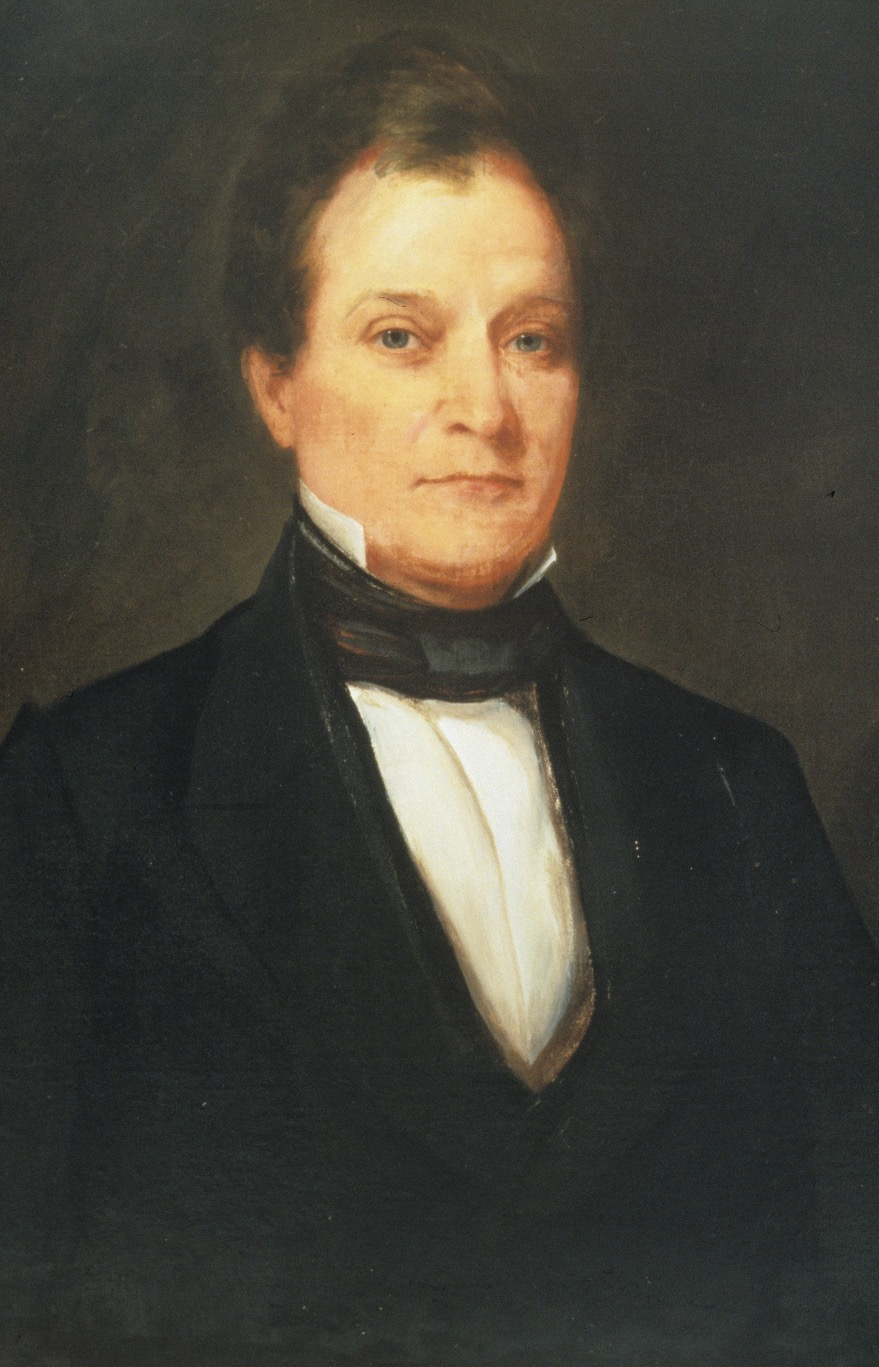
- Portrait of Campbell by Washington B. Cooper, c. 1845

14th Governor of Tennessee
- In office October 16, 1851 – October 17, 1853
- Preceded by: William Trousdale
- Succeeded by: Andrew Johnson

Member of the U.S. House of Representatives from Tennessee's 5th district
- In office July 24, 1866 – March 3, 1867
- Preceded by: Robert H. Hatton
- Succeeded by: John Trimble

Member of the U.S. House of Representatives from Tennessee's 6th district
- In office March 4, 1837 – March 3, 1843
- Preceded by: Balie Peyton
- Succeeded by: Aaron V. Brown

Personal details
- Born: William Bowen Campbell; February 1, 1807 Sumner County, Tennessee, U.S.
- Died: August 19, 1867 (aged 60) Lebanon, Tennessee, U.S.
- Resting place: Cedar Grove Cemetery
- Party: Whig
- Spouse: Frances Owen
- Profession: Attorney

Military service
- Branch/service: Tennessee Militia; United States Army
- Years of service: 1836–1837; 1846–1847; 1862–1863
- Rank: Brigadier General
- Commands: 1st Regiment Tennessee Volunteers
- Battles/wars: Second Seminole War; Mexican–American War; Battle of Monterrey; Siege of Veracruz; Battle of Cerro Gordo; American Civil War

William Bowen Campbell (February 1, 1807 – August 19, 1867) was an American politician and soldier. He served as the 14th governor of Tennessee from 1851 to 1853, and was the state's last Whig governor. He also served four terms in the United States House of Representatives, from 1837 to 1843, and from 1866 to 1867.

During the Mexican–American War, Campbell commanded the First Regiment Tennessee Volunteers, known as the "Bloody First" for its high casualty rate. At the outbreak of the American Civil War, Campbell opposed secession, and briefly served as a general in the Union Army.

== Early life ==
Campbell was born on Mansker's Creek in Sumner County, Tennessee, to David and Catherine Bowen Campbell. He studied law at Abingdon, Virginia, with his father's cousin, Virginia Governor David Campbell, and attended lectures at Winchester Law School. He returned to Tennessee in 1829 in order to establish a law practice at Carthage, in Smith County. He was admitted to the bar in 1830. In 1831, he was appointed attorney general for a state circuit, and moved to Sparta, Tennessee.

== Military and political career ==
In 1835, Campbell moved back to Carthage, and was elected to Smith County's seat in the Tennessee House of Representatives. He resigned his seat in 1836, however, in order to fight in the Second Seminole War. He served as a captain under Colonel William Trousdale.

In 1837, Campbell successfully ran against Trousdale for the state's 6th District seat in the United States House of Representatives. The campaign was "spirited," though there was no bitterness between the two candidates. In 1839, Campbell ran for reelection, again defeating Trousdale. He ran unopposed in 1841. Near the end of his third term in 1843 he resigned and returned to his law practice in Carthage. That same year, he was appointed major-general of the Tennessee militia.

Upon the outbreak of the Mexican–American War in 1846, Campbell answered Tennessee Governor Aaron V. Brown's call for volunteers. He was elected colonel of the First Regiment Tennessee Volunteers on June 3, 1846, and arrived with his regiment in Texas the following month. At the Battle of Monterrey later that year, this company lost one-third of its men in an assault on the town's citadel, earning the nickname, the "Bloody First." Campbell's company also saw action at the Siege of Veracruz and the Battle of Cerro Gordo in 1847.

After the war, Campbell was appointed by the legislature to a state circuit court judgeship. In 1851, he received the Whig nomination for governor. His opponent was William Trousdale, his old Seminole War superior, who had been elected in a close election in 1849. Trousdale had endorsed the Nashville Convention of 1850, in which southern states threatened to secede if the federal government attempted to ban slavery in newly acquired territories, and blasted the Compromise of 1850, which admitted California as a free state. He accused Campbell of being "too favorable to northern views." Campbell on the other hand called the Compromise a "work of wisdom," and derided the Nashville Convention as treasonous. Running with the campaign slogan, "Boys, follow me!" which he had yelled at the Battle of Monterrey, Campbell edged Trousdale by a vote of 63,333 to 61,673.

As governor, Campbell called for a more rational approach to resolving sectional strife, and demanded an end to the "insane" talk of secession. After his initial term in 1853, he did not run for reelection, instead choosing to accept a position as President of the Bank of Middle Tennessee in Lebanon, Tennessee. The Whigs nominated Gustavus A. Henry, who was defeated by the Democratic candidate Andrew Johnson in the general election.

== Secession and the Civil War ==
Following the collapse of the Whig Party in the mid-1850s, Campbell threw his support behind the American Party ("Know Nothings"), which many Tennessee Whigs had joined. He was again appointed to a circuit court judgeship in 1859, and continued campaigning against secession. In 1860, he supported Constitutional Union Party candidate and fellow Tennessee Whig John Bell for president.

In May 1861, as a wave of pro-secession sentiment swept through Middle Tennessee in the wake of the attack on Fort Sumter, Tennessee's ex-Whigs and others opposed to secession convened in Nashville, and nominated Campbell to oppose Isham Harris in the gubernatorial election later that year. Campbell declined this offer, however. Governor Harris offered him a command in the Confederate Army, but he declined this, as well.

In early 1862, after the Union Army occupied Middle Tennessee, Assistant Secretary of War Thomas A. Scott recommended Campbell for military governor, but the appointment went to Andrew Johnson. On May 12, 1862, Campbell chaired a convention of Tennessee Unionists that mapped out a plan to bring the state back into the Union. Shortly afterward, President Abraham Lincoln appointed him brigadier general in the Union Army. He accepted this commission, but resigned in January 1863, in part for health issues, and in part because he did not want to fight against his friends and neighbors.

In 1864, Campbell aligned himself with the Democratic Party, and supported George B. McClellan for the presidency. Though he disagreed with Johnson over several issues, namely election regulations Johnson had installed as military governor, he generally supported the Johnson presidency's Reconstruction policies. After the war, Campbell was elected as a Conservative to represent the state's fifth congressional district in the House of Representatives, but was prevented by Radical Republicans from taking his seat for several months. Campbell defended Johnson during his impeachment hearings in the House in 1867, and served as an advisor during his trial in the Senate.

== Death ==
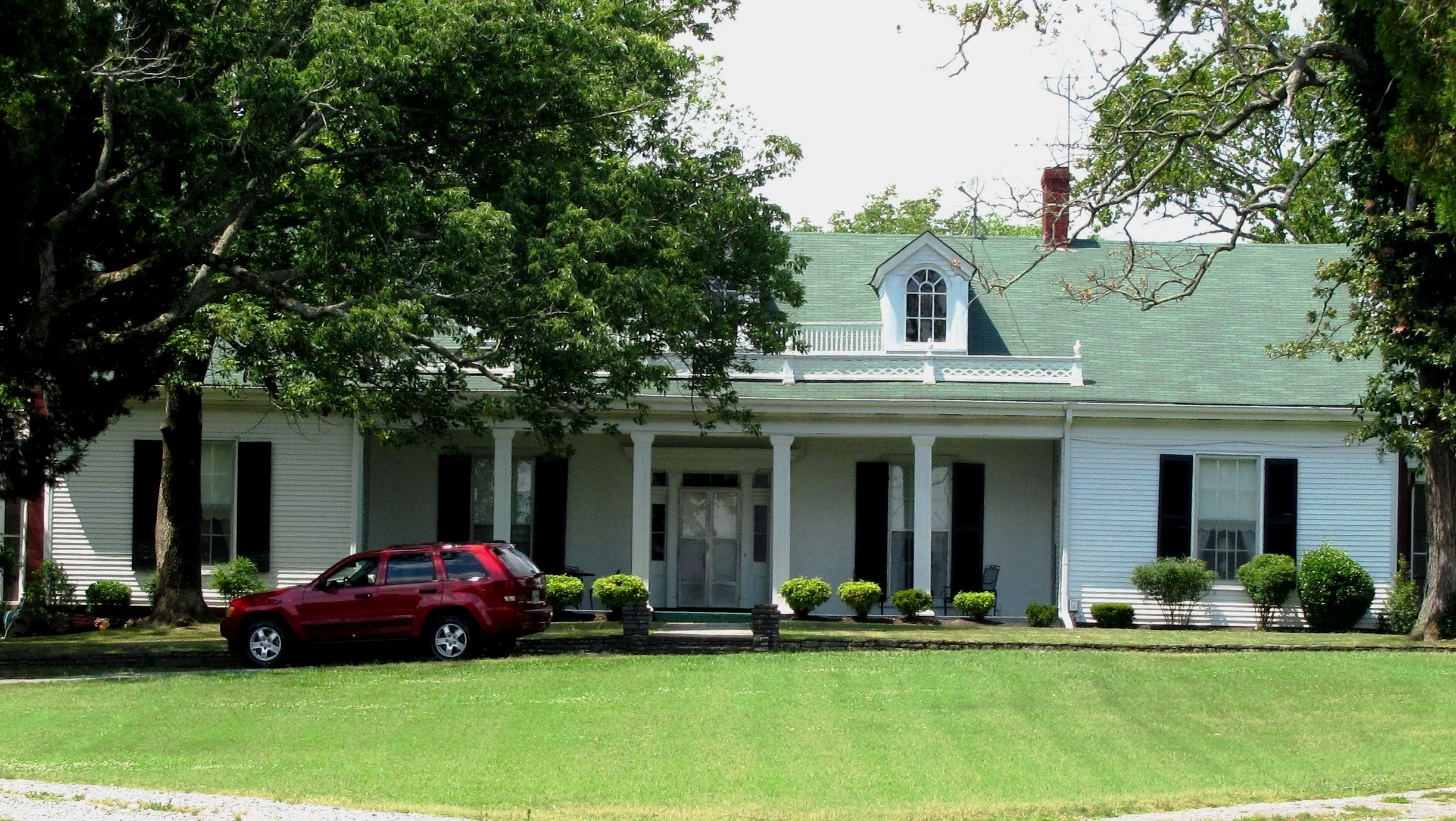
Camp Bell, Campbell's family home.

Campbell died on August 19, 1867, at his family home of Camp Bell. He is interred at Cedar Grove Cemetery in Lebanon, Tennessee.

== Family ==
William Bowen Campbell was a great-grandson of two early Scots-Irish Virginia pioneers, "Black" David Campbell (b. 1710) and "White" David Campbell (b. 1706). His paternal grandfather, a son of "Black David" known as Captain David Campbell (1753–1832), was an early Knox County pioneer who built Campbell's Station, which has evolved into modern Farragut, Tennessee. Captain David Campbell was married to Margaret Campbell, a daughter of "White David." Her brothers (i.e., William B. Campbell's great-uncles) included Colonel Arthur Campbell (1743–1811) and Judge David Campbell (1750–1812), and her nephews included Governor David Campbell (1779–1859) and Colonel John B. Campbell (1777–1814). She was a cousin of General William Campbell of Kings Mountain fame.

Campbell's mother, Catherine Bowen, was a granddaughter of General William Russell (1735–1793), who had helped draft the Declaration of Independence. The house built in 1787 by Campbell's maternal grandfather, Captain William Bowen (1742–1804), still stands in modern Goodlettsville, and is listed on the National Register of Historic Places as the Bowen-Campbell House. A house built by Campbell's uncle, John Henry Bowen (1770–1822), still stands in Gallatin, and is listed on the National Register as the Trousdale Place. After his uncle's death, the house was, ironically, purchased by William Trousdale, Campbell's future gubernatorial opponent.

Campbell married Frances Owen in 1835. They had seven children: Mary, Margaret, Fanny, William, Joseph, John Owen, and Lemuel.

== Honors and awards ==
Fort Campbell, Kentucky, is named in his honor.

== See also ==
- List of American Civil War generals (Union)
- List of governors of Tennessee

Party political offices
| Preceded by Neill S. Brown | Whig nominee for Governor of Tennessee; 1851 | Succeeded by Gustavus Adolphus Henry Sr. |
U.S. House of Representatives
| Preceded by Balie Peyton | Member of the U.S. House of Representatives from Tennessee's 6th congressional district 1837–1843 | Succeeded by Aaron V. Brown |
| Preceded by Robert H. Hatton | Member of the U.S. House of Representatives from Tennessee's 5th congressional district 1866–1867 | Succeeded by John Trimble |
Political offices
| Preceded by William Trousdale | Governor of Tennessee; 1851–1853 | Succeeded by Andrew Johnson |
