= 1880 Tennessee gubernatorial election =

- November 2, 1880
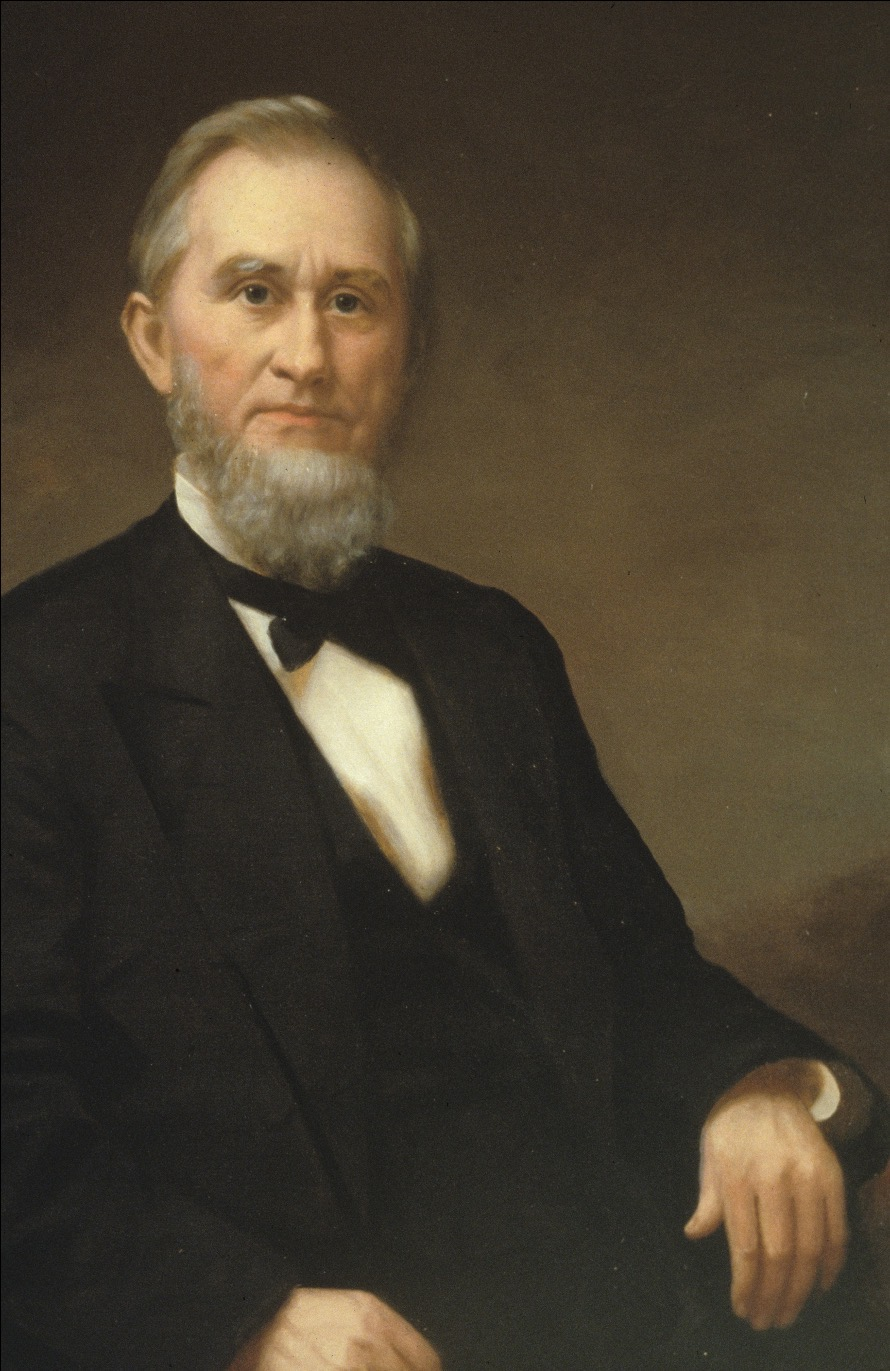

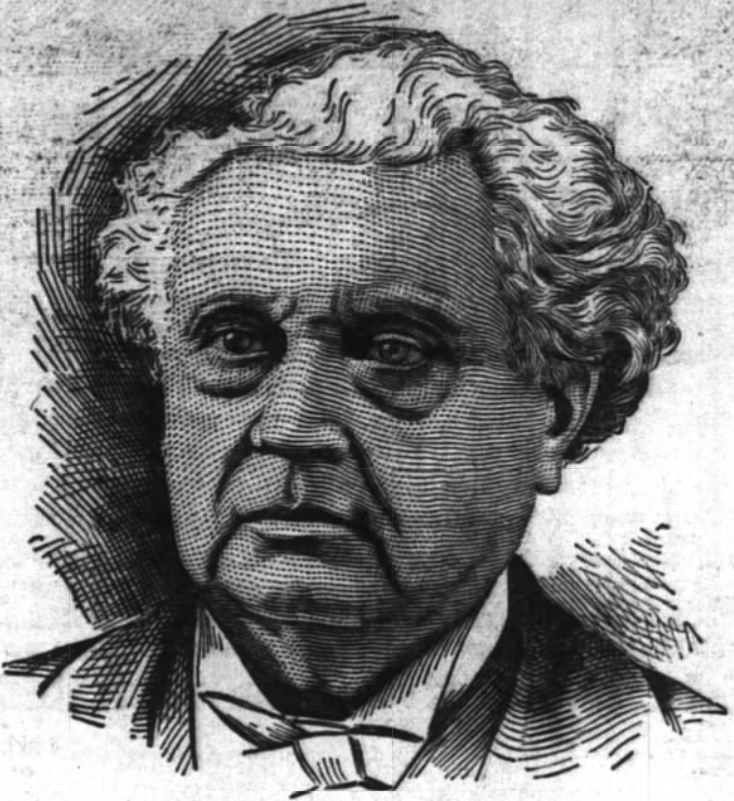

Nominee	Alvin Hawkins	John Vines Wright	S.F. Wilson
Party	Republican	Debt-Paying Democrat	Low Tax Democrat
Popular vote	103,966	79,081	57,568
Percentage	42.57%	32.38%	23.57%
- County results Hawkins: 40–50% 50–60% 60–70% 70–80% 80–90% Wright: 30–40% 40–50% 50–60% 60–70% 70–80% 80–90% Wilson: 40–50% 50–60% 60–70% 70–80% No data
Governor before election
Albert S. Marks
Democratic
Elected Governor
Alvin Hawkins
Republican

The 1880 Tennessee gubernatorial election was held on November 2, 1880, to elect the next governor of Tennessee. Incumbent Democratic governor Albert S. Marks did not seek re-election. Republican candidate Alvin Hawkins won the election with 42.57% of the vote.

This was the first time that a Republican won against a Democrat in the state's history. The victory was largely due to a split between two factions of Democrats. Alvin Hawkins became Tennessee's 3rd Republican governor.

== Background ==
The Democratic Party gained control of the state legislature in 1869, and won the governorship in 1870. One of the major issues the Democratic administration faced was the state's $43 million of debt, the second largest in the nation behind Virginia, it had accumulated over the previous decades to pay for internal improvements and railroad construction. The debt fell to $30 million by 1873.

The Panic of 1873 brought a decrease in property tax revenues, and the state defaulted on its bond payments in 1875. Following this default, the Democrats split into two factions, one of which sought to protect the state's credit at all costs and pay off the bonds in full, and the other rejecting this as unfeasible and suggesting just partial payment of the bond debt. Governor James D. Porter (1875–1879) was of the former faction, and Governor Albert S. Marks (1879–1881) was of the latter, but neither was able to solve the problem. Andrew Johnson was among the members of the low-tax faction.

A referendum was held in 1879 on whether or not to redeem bonds at half of their face value. State credit faction members and Marks supported it while the low-tax faction opposed it. The referendum failed by a vote of 76,333 to 49,772.

== Campaign ==
The Tennessee Republican Party held its state convention in Nashville on May 5, 1880, and selected Alvin Hawkins as its gubernatorial nominee. The Greenback Party selected Richard M. Edwards, its 1878 nominee, as its gubernatorial nominee.

The Democratic Party's convention opened on August 10, and Marks declined to run for re-election. The state credit faction held a majority of the delegates and passed a majority report calling for the legislature to negotiate with the state's creditors. State representative D.L. Snodgrass led 100 of the around 1,300 delegates out of the convention in protest. The remaining delegates selected John Vines Wright as their nominee on August 12, while the bolting delegates selected state senator S.F. Wilson.

This was the first time the Republicans won the governorship since losing it in the 1870 election. The Republicans would not win the governorship again until the 1910 election.

== Endorsements ==
S.F. Wilson

State legislators

- John H. Savage, member of the Tennessee House of Representatives (1877-79; 1887-1891)
- Dorsey B. Thomas, Speaker of the Tennessee Senate (1869-1871) and gubernatorial candidate in 1876

Newspapers

- McMinnville New Era
- Memphis Ledger
John Vines Wright

U.S. Congress

- James E. Bailey, U.S. senator from Tennessee (1877-1881)
- Isham G. Harris, U.S. senator from Tennessee (1877-1897)

Statewide officials

- John C. Brown, 19th governor of Tennessee (1871-1875)
- John Christopher Burch, Comptroller of the Treasury of Tennessee (1873-1875)

Newspapers

- Memphis Avalanche
- Nashville Banner

Notable individuals

- Arthur St. Clair Colyar, industrialist and newspaper editor

== Results ==
1880 Tennessee gubernatorial election
Party	Candidate	Votes	%	±%
Republican	Alvin Hawkins	103,966	42.57%	
Democratic	John Vines Wright	79,081	32.38%	
Democratic	S.F. Wilson	57,568	23.57%	
Greenback	Richard M. Edwards	3,614	1.48%	
Total votes		244,259	100.00%	
Republican gain from Democratic				

== See also ==
- 1880 United States presidential election in Tennessee

== Works cited ==
- Jones, Robert (1974). "Tennessee Gubernatorial Elections, II 1880: The Collapse of the Democratic Party". Tennessee Historical Quarterly. 33 (1). Tennessee Historical Society: 49–61. doi:10.2307/42623427. JSTOR 42623427.
