= Alvin Hawkins =

American judge

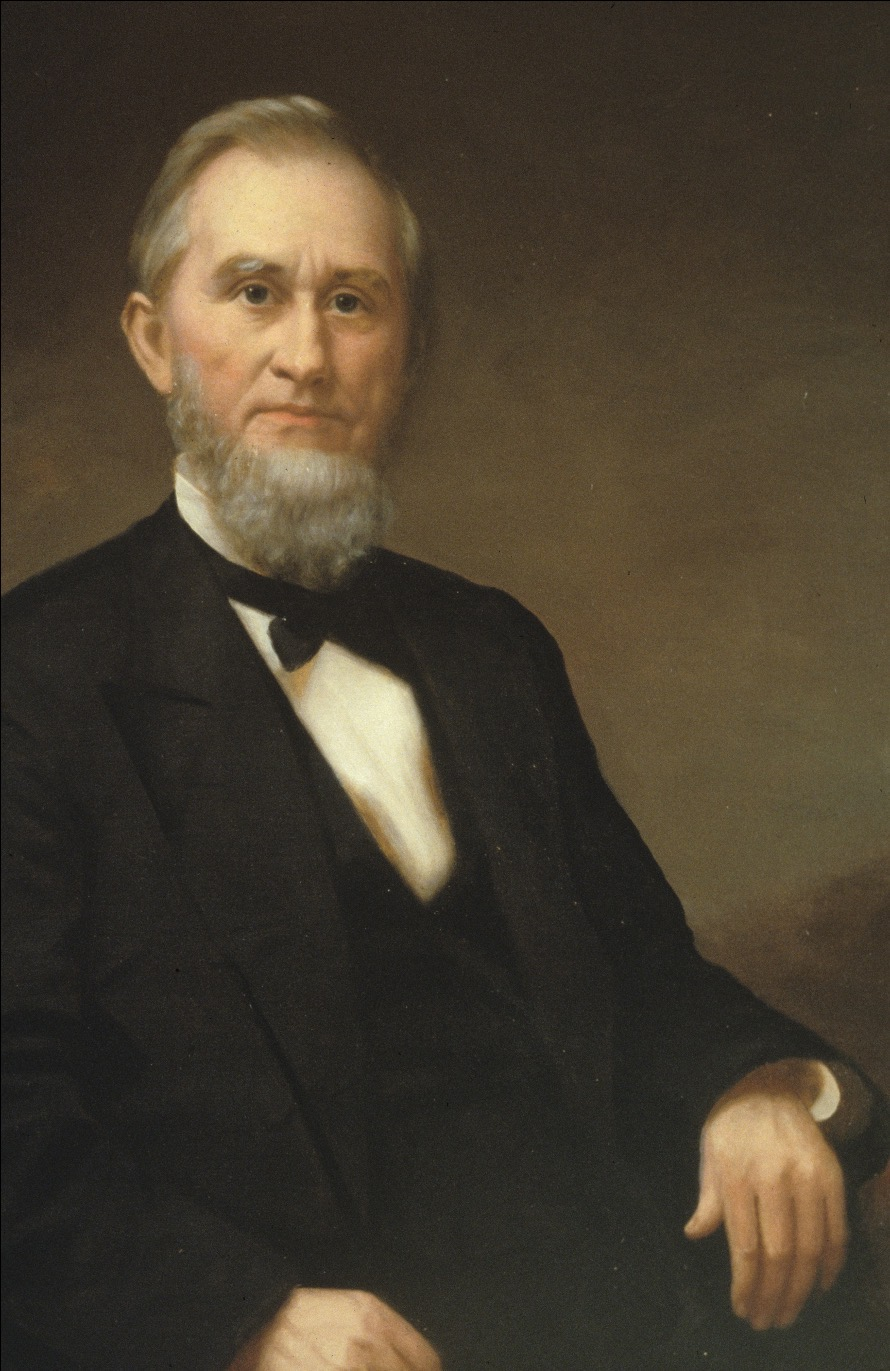
- Portrait of Hawkins by Washington B. Cooper

22nd Governor of Tennessee
- In office January 17, 1881 – January 15, 1883
- Preceded by: Albert S. Marks
- Succeeded by: William B. Bate

Member of the Tennessee House of Representatives
- In office 1853–1855

Personal details
- Born: December 2, 1821 Bath County, Kentucky, U.S.
- Died: April 27, 1905 (aged 83) Huntingdon, Tennessee, U.S.
- Resting place: Hawkins Cemetery, Carroll County, Tennessee
- Party: Whig; Republican
- Spouse: Justina Ott (m. 1847)
- Relations: Isaac R. Hawkins (cousin)
- Profession: Attorney

Alvin Hawkins (December 2, 1821 – April 27, 1905) was an American jurist and politician. He served as the 22nd governor of Tennessee from 1881 to 1883, one of just three Republicans to hold this position from the end of Reconstruction to the latter half of the 20th century. Hawkins was also a judge on the Tennessee Supreme Court in the late 1860s, and was briefly the U.S. consul to Havana, Cuba, in 1868.

== Early life ==
Hawkins was born in Bath County, Kentucky, the eldest of thirteen children of John Hawkins and Mary (Ralston) Hawkins. He was of English descent. When he was four, his parents moved to Maury County, Tennessee, and two years later moved to Carroll County. Hawkins attended McLemoresville Academy and Bethel College, and was taught farming and blacksmithing by his father. He eventually turned to law, however, which he studied while earning money teaching school. He read law under Judge Benjamin Totten, and was admitted to the bar in 1843. He briefly practiced with his cousin, Isaac R. Hawkins, before establishing his own practice in Huntingdon.

== Early political career ==
A Whig, Hawkins first ran for a seat in the Tennessee House of Representatives in 1845, but was unsuccessful. He ran again in 1853, and this time, he was successful, but he served only one term and did not seek reelection. He campaigned against secession in the late 1850s, and supported Constitutional Union Party candidate John Bell, who opposed secession and took a neutral stance on the issue of slavery, in the presidential election of 1860. While many anti-secession Tennessee Whigs switched their support to the Confederacy after the Battle of Fort Sumter, Hawkins remained staunchly pro-Union for the duration of the Civil War.

In December 1862, after the Union Army had regained control of much of West Tennessee, the state's military governor, Andrew Johnson, called for congressional elections to be held in its 9th and 10th congressional districts. Hawkins was elected to the 9th district seat, but the House of Representatives deemed his vote total (1,900) to be too low in proportion to his district's population (18,000), and refused to seat him. He spent the next few months scouting West Tennessee to gather information for the state's military authorities. In 1864, he was appointed United States Attorney for West Tennessee by President Abraham Lincoln.

In 1865, Hawkins was appointed to the newly reconstituted Tennessee Supreme Court by Governor William G. Brownlow. He served alongside J. O. Shackleford and Sam Milligan. Among the cases the court decided during his tenure was Ridley v. Sherbrook, in which the court upheld the Brownlow administration's strict voting requirements. He resigned in 1868, and briefly served as U.S. Consul to Havana, Cuba. Later that year, the state legislature, responding to irritation over Brownlow's court appointees, called for elections to choose new justices to the court. Hawkins was among the Republican nominees, and since most Democrats were still disfranchised, he was elected. His term ended, however, with the enactment of the new Tennessee State Constitution in 1870, and he returned to his law practice in Huntingdon.

== Governor ==
Throughout the 1870s, Tennessee struggled to control the debt it had accumulated over the previous decades to pay for internal improvements and railroad construction. The Panic of 1873 brought a decrease in property tax revenues, and the state defaulted on its bond payments in 1875. Following this default, the Democratic Party split into two factions, one of which sought to protect the state's credit at all costs and pay off the bonds in full, and the other rejecting this as unfeasible and suggesting just partial payment of the bond debt. Governor James D. Porter (1875–1879) was of the former faction, and Governor Albert S. Marks (1879–1881) was of the latter, but neither was able to solve the problem.

By 1880, the split over the debt issue had left the Democratic Party seriously divided, and Marks declined to run for reelection. At the party's state convention in May of that year, John Wright, who represented the faction that sought full payment of the debt, known as the "state credit" or "high tax" faction, was nominated as the party's candidate for governor. Members of the "low tax" faction, which sought only a partial payment of the debt and demanded any change in the debt policy be put before the voters in a referendum, walked out of the convention and nominated their own candidate, S.F. Wilson. Republicans nominated Hawkins, and the Greenback Party nominated Richard M. Edwards. In the general election, Hawkins won with 103,964 votes to 78,783 for Wright, 57,080 for Wilson, and 3,459 for Edwards.

Hawkins favored full repayment of the state debt. In May 1881, the state legislature, where the divided Democrats controlled the senate and Republicans controlled the house by one seat, passed a bill that called for all state bonds held by commercial interests to be replaced by new bonds of equal dollar value, but with a 3% interest rate, and called for the state property tax to be quadrupled. The bill passed the House and Senate, and was signed into law by Hawkins. The "low tax" Democrats challenged the law in court, however, and the act was declared unconstitutional by the Tennessee Supreme Court in February 1882. In May 1882, the legislature passed a plan calling for payment of commercial bonds at 60%, but this was never enacted.

During the gubernatorial campaign of 1882, state Democrats remained divided, but the "low tax" Democrats, with the help of former governor Isham G. Harris and the Bourbon faction, gained the upper hand. General William Brimage Bate, who favored full repayment on bonds for schools and charities, and partial repayment on commercial bonds, was nominated as the candidate. The "high tax" Democrats nominated Joseph Fussell, and the Greenbacks nominated John R. Beasley. On election day, Bate won with 120,637 votes to 93,168 for Hawkins, 9,660 for Beasley, and 4,814 for Fussell.

Although Hawkins failed to win reelection, he was praised by members of both parties for running an honest government, helping to erase the stigma attached to the Republican Party as a result of the Brownlow administration's radical post-war policies. Hawkins also enacted several judicial and educational reforms. He appointed W.S. Doak, a descendant of legendary clergyman Samuel Doak, state superintendent of schools, and the state's first professional institute was established during his tenure as governor.

== Later life ==
Following his term as governor, Hawkins returned to his law practice in Huntingdon. He remained active in the Methodist Church, and stumped for unsuccessful Republican gubernatorial candidate Henry Clay Evans in 1894. He died at his home in Huntingdon on April 27, 1905.

== Family ==
Hawkins was married on August 17, 1847, to Justina Ott. They had six children, four dying young. Hawkins was from a prominent family; his brother Ashton William Hawkins (1824–1888) was a clerk of the circuit court, a doctor, and a minister. Another brother, Albert G. Hawkins (1841–1908), was a judge, lawyer and served in the Tennessee state senate. Alvin's mother, Mary ("Polly") Graham Ralston, was a first cousin of California governor John Neely Johnson.

Party political offices
Preceded by Eli M. Wight	Republican nominee for Governor of Tennessee; 1880, 1882	Succeeded by Frank T. Reid
Political offices
Preceded by Albert S. Marks	Governor of Tennessee; 1881-1883	Succeeded by William B. Bate
