= 1878 Tennessee gubernatorial election =

- November 5, 1878
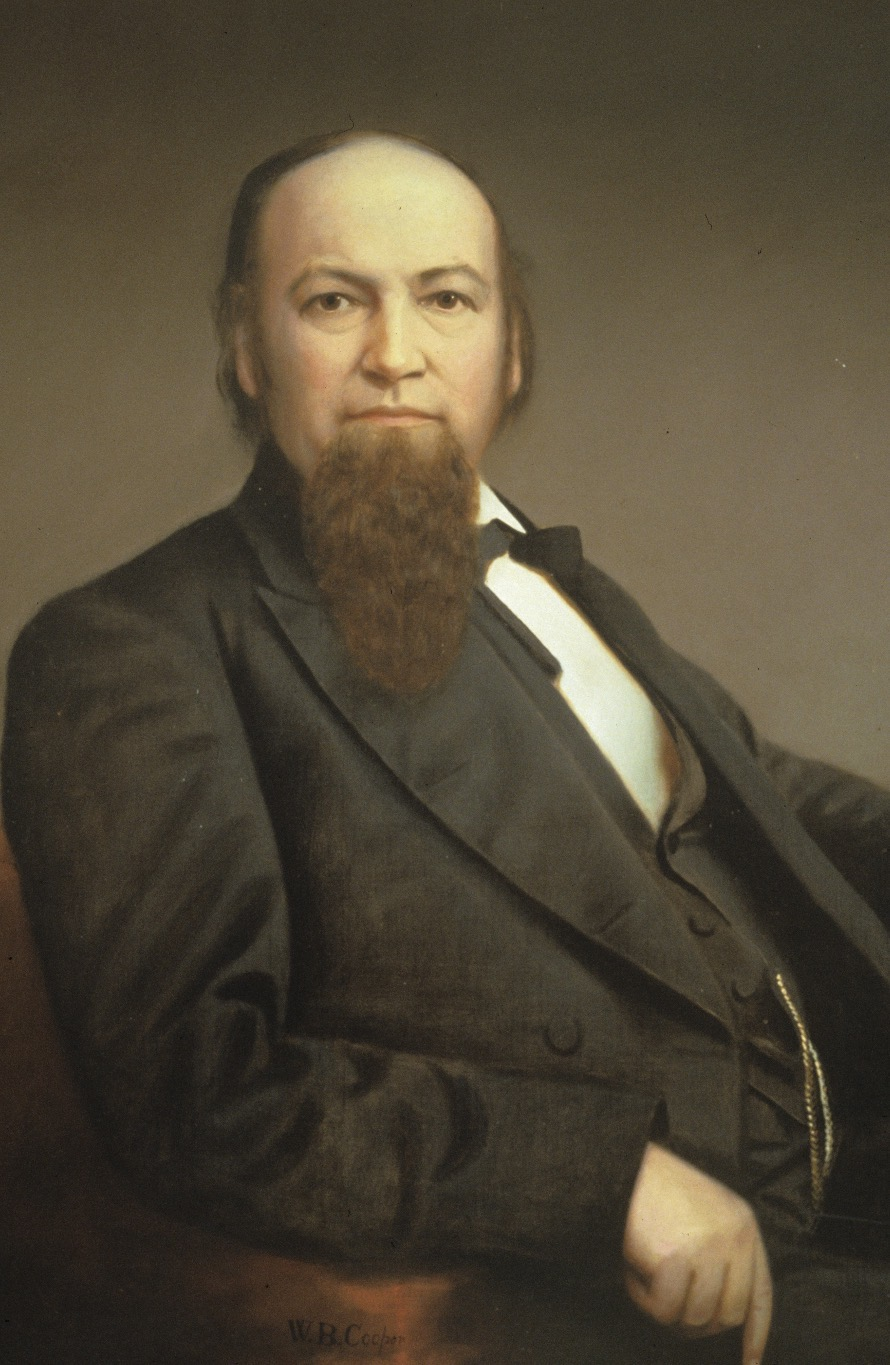

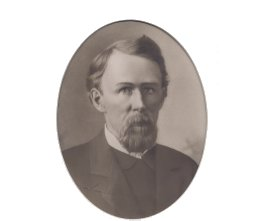

Nominee	Albert S. Marks	Eli M. Wight	Richard M. Edwards
Party	Democratic	Republican	Greenback
Popular vote	89,958	42,284	15,155
Percentage	60.03%	28.69%	10.28%
- County results Marks: 30–40% 40–50% 50–60% 60–70% 70–80% 80–90% >90% Wight: 40–50% 50–60% 60–70% 70–80% 80–90% >90% No data
Governor before election
James D. Porter
Democratic
Elected Governor
Albert S. Marks
Democratic

The 1878 Tennessee gubernatorial election was held on November 5, 1878, to elect the next governor of Tennessee. Incumbent Democratic governor James D. Porter did not seek re-election. Democratic candidate Albert S. Marks was elected with 60.03% of the vote.

Marks was the first lifelong Democrat to be elected after the Civil War (his two predecessors, John C. Brown and James D. Porter, had been Whigs before the war).

== General election ==
1878 Tennessee gubernatorial election
Party	Candidate	Votes	%	±%
Democratic	Albert S. Marks	89,958	60.03	
Republican	Eli M. Wight	42,284	28.69	
Greenback	Richard M. Edwards	15,155	10.28	
Total votes		147,397	100.00	
