= Governor Hawkins =

Governor Hawkins may refer to:

- Alvin Hawkins (1821–1905), 22nd Governor of Tennessee
- William Hawkins (governor) (1777–1819), 17th Governor of North Carolina
