= 1876 Tennessee gubernatorial election =

- November 7, 1876
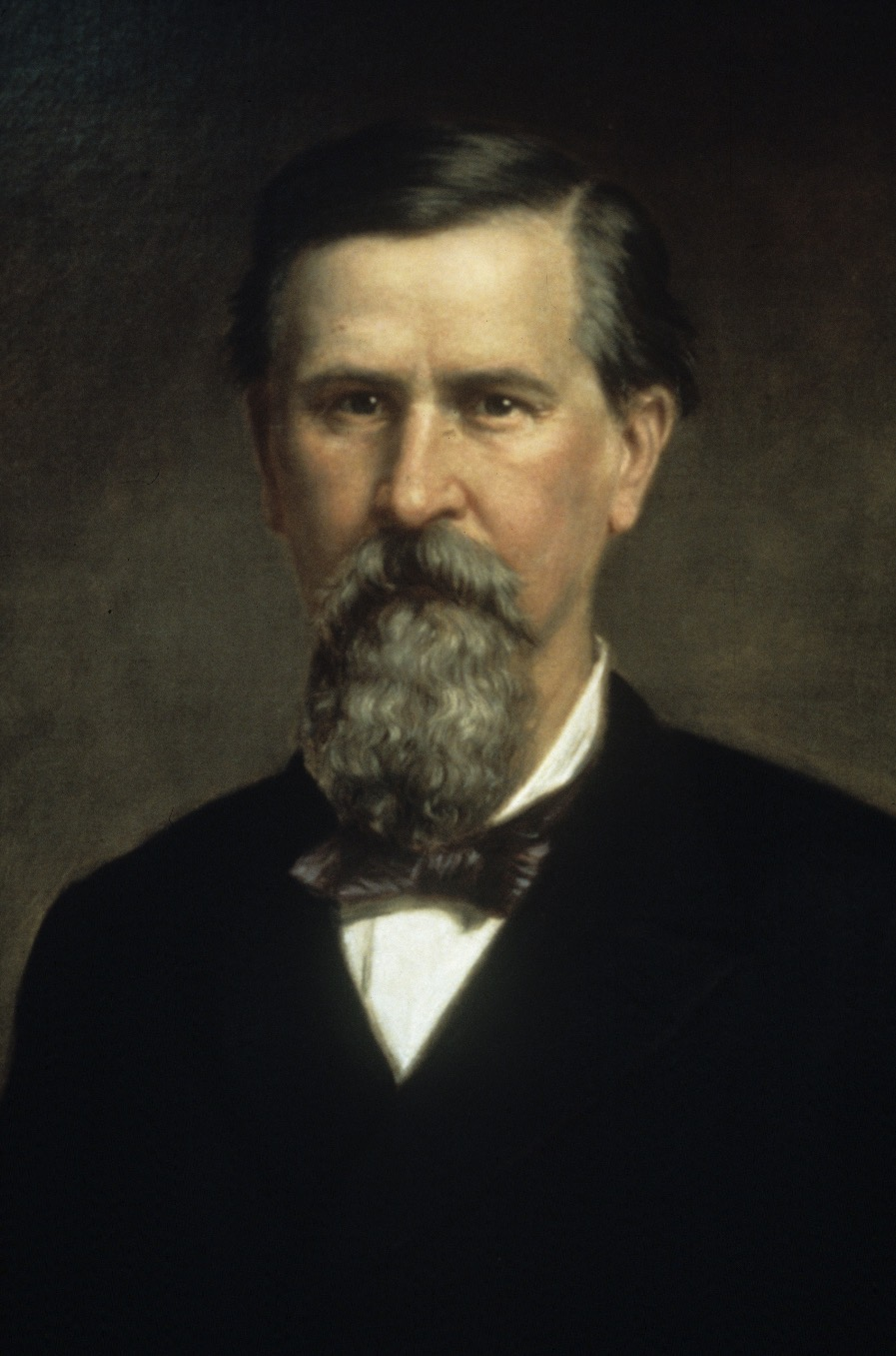

Nominee	James D. Porter	Dorsey B. Thomas
Party	Democratic	Independent
Popular vote	123,740	73,695
Percentage	58.91%	35.09%
- County results Porter: 50–60% 60–70% 70–80% 80–90% >90% Thomas: 50–60% 60–70% 70–80% No data
Governor before election
James D. Porter
Democratic
Elected Governor
James D. Porter
Democratic

The 1876 Tennessee gubernatorial election was held on November 7, 1876, to elect the governor of Tennessee. Incumbent Democratic governor James D. Porter won re-election over several candidates with 58.91% of the vote.

Republican George Earl Maney initially ran for governor, but withdrew from the race before the election.

Independent Republican candidate William F. Yardley became the state's first African-American candidate for governor.

== General election ==
1876 Tennessee gubernatorial election
Party	Candidate	Votes	%	±%
Democratic	James D. Porter (incumbent)	123,740	58.91	
Independent	Dorsey B. Thomas	73,695	35.09	
Republican	George Earl Maney	10,436	4.97	
Independent Republican	William F. Yardley	2,165	1.03	
Total votes		210,036	100.00	

== See also ==
- 1876 United States presidential election in Tennessee
