= William B. Bate =

American politician (1826–1905)

William Brimage Bate
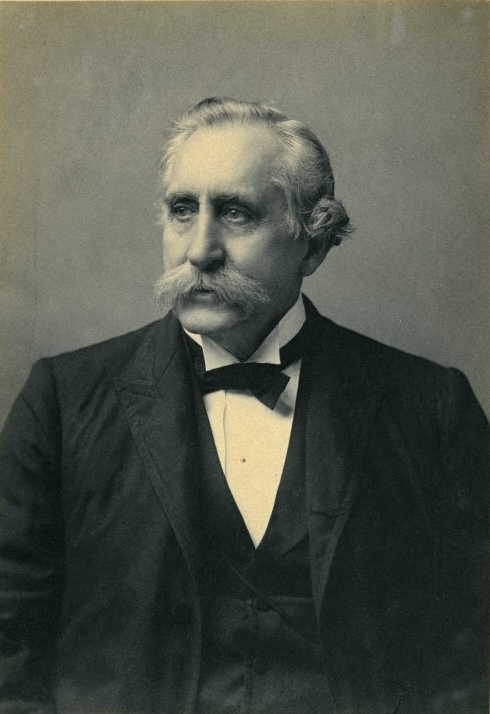

23rd Governor of Tennessee
- In office January 15, 1883 – January 17, 1887
- Preceded by: Alvin Hawkins
- Succeeded by: Robert Love Taylor

United States Senator from Tennessee
- In office March 4, 1887 – March 9, 1905
- Preceded by: Washington C. Whitthorne
- Succeeded by: James B. Frazier

Member of the Tennessee House of Representatives
- In office 1849-1851

Personal details
- Born: October 7, 1826 Castalian Springs, Tennessee, U.S.
- Died: March 9, 1905 (aged 78) Washington, D.C., U.S.
- Resting place: Mount Olivet Cemetery (Nashville)
- Party: Democratic
- Spouse: Julia Peete (m. 1856)

Military service
- Allegiance: United States; CSA
- Branch/service: United States Volunteers; Confederate States Army
- Years of service: 1846–1848 (USA); 1861–1865 (CSA)
- Rank: First Lieutenant (USA); Major General (CSA)
- Unit: 2nd Tennessee Infantry
- Commands: 3rd Tennessee Infantry; Bate's Bde, Stewart's Division; Bate's Division
- Battles/wars: Mexican–American War American Civil War: Battle of Aquia Creek; First Battle of Bull Run; Battle of Shiloh; Battle of Hoover's Gap; Battle of Chickamauga; Battle of Missionary Ridge; Battle of Resaca; Battle of New Hope Church; Battle of Dallas; Battle of Kennesaw Mountain; Battle of Peachtree Creek; Battle of Atlanta; Battle of Franklin (1864); Battle of Nashville; Battle of Bentonville

William Brimage Bate (October 7, 1826 – March 9, 1905) was a planter and slaveholder, Confederate officer, and politician in Tennessee. After the Reconstruction era, he served as the 23rd governor of Tennessee from 1883 to 1887. He was elected to the United States Senate from Tennessee, serving from 1887 until his death.

During the Civil War, he had fought for the Confederacy, eventually rising to the rank of major general and commanding a division in the Army of Tennessee. Bate saw action in multiple engagements throughout the war, and was seriously wounded on two occasions.

== Early life and career ==
Bate was born in Bledsoe's Lick (now Castalian Springs) in Sumner County, Tennessee, the son of James H. Bate and the former Amanda Weatherred. He attended a log schoolhouse known as the "Rural Academy". When he was 15, his father died, and he left home to find work. He was eventually hired as a clerk on the steamboat, Saladin, which traveled up and down the Cumberland, Ohio, and Mississippi rivers between Nashville and New Orleans.

While his steamboat was docked in New Orleans, word came of the outbreak of the Mexican–American War in 1848, and Bate enlisted in a Louisiana regiment. When this enlistment ended a few months later, he reenlisted with the rank of lieutenant in Company I of the 3rd Tennessee Volunteer Infantry. He accompanied General Joseph Lane on several raids in pursuit of Santa Anna toward the end of the war.

After the war, Bate returned to his family farm in Sumner County, and established a pro-Democratic Party newspaper, the Tenth Legion, in nearby Gallatin. He was elected to the Tennessee House of Representatives in 1849. In 1852, he obtained his law degree from Cumberland University in Lebanon, Tennessee and was admitted to the bar. After the state constitution was amended to allow for direct election of judicial officers in 1854, Bate was elected attorney general for the Nashville district.

Bate campaigned for Democratic gubernatorial candidate Andrew Johnson in 1855, and was an elector for Southern Democratic presidential candidate John C. Breckinridge in 1860. He was offered his district's nomination for Congress in 1859, but declined. He was a staunch supporter of secession in the years leading up to the Civil War.

== American Civil War ==
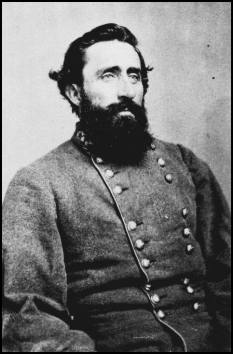
Bate in uniform, c. 1862

Following the Battle of Fort Sumter in April 1861, Bate enlisted in a private company in Gallatin, and was elected as its captain. In early May, after Tennessee aligned with the Confederacy, Bate was elected colonel of the 2nd Tennessee Infantry. This unit was quickly dispatched to Virginia, where it was among the forces tasked with guarding the Richmond, Fredericksburg and Potomac Railroad. Bate was present at the Battle of Aquia Creek on May 30, 1861. At the First Battle of Bull Run (First Battle of Manassas) in July 1861, Bate was in the reserve brigade of Theophilus Holmes in the Confederate Army of the Potomac.

Bate's unit remained on the Potomac River until February 1862, when, at his request, his unit was transferred to the Western Theater. The 2nd Tennessee was placed under Albert Sidney Johnston's Army of Mississippi, which was conducting operations in the Corinth area. Bate's unit marched north with the Army of Mississippi in its attempt to check Ulysses S. Grant's advance at the Battle of Shiloh in April 1862. Bate was wounded severely in the leg during the first day's fighting, and an Army surgeon told him it would be necessary to amputate his leg to save his life. Bate drew his pistol, threatening to shoot the surgeon, and kept his leg. Although he survived, he was incapacitated for several months, and walked with a limp the rest of his life. Several of Bate's relatives were killed at Shiloh, and his horse was shot out from under him.

After spending several months recovering in Columbus, Mississippi, Bate was promoted to brigadier general on October 2, 1862. He was initially given tasks away from the frontlines in North Alabama, but when he demanded a return to action, General Braxton Bragg created an infantry brigade for him to command in the Army of Tennessee. He took part in the Tullahoma Campaign, and saw action at the Battle of Hoover's Gap in June 1863. During this period, Tennessee's Confederate leaders offered Bate the gubernatorial nomination to replace term-limited governor Isham G. Harris, but Bate declined, preferring to stay on the frontlines.

At the Battle of Chickamauga, Bate engaged in a skirmish with enemy forces that opened the fighting on the evening of September 18, 1863. In the intense fighting that took place on the following day, three of his horses were shot out from under him. During the reorganization of the Army of Tennessee after this battle, Bate was given command of John C. Breckinridge's division (Breckinridge had been promoted to Corps commander). Bate commanded this division at the Battle of Missionary Ridge in November 1863.

As a result of his service in the Chattanooga campaign, Bate was promoted to major general on February 24, 1864. That summer, his division took part in the Atlanta campaign, and saw action at the battles of Resaca, New Hope Church, Kennesaw Mountain, and Peachtree Creek, as well as the main Battle of Atlanta on July 22. At the Battle of Utoy Creek on August 6, Bate used a deception plan that foiled the main Union attack. He was shot in the knee in a skirmish at Willis' Grist Mill near Atlanta on August 10, and was bedridden in Barnesville, Georgia, for several weeks.

Bate rejoined his division in time to take part in General John B. Hood's invasion of Tennessee in late 1864. At the Battle of Franklin on November 30, he lost nearly 20% of his division, and his horse was again shot out from under him. He commanded General Benjamin F. Cheatham's right flank at the Battle of Nashville two weeks later.

Bate's division remained with Cheatham's Corps during the 1865 Carolinas campaign, during which he saw action at the Battle of Bentonville in March. Bate and his men surrendered at Bennett Place near Greensboro, North Carolina. During the war, he was wounded three times and had six horses shot and killed beneath him.

== After the Civil War ==
After the war, Bate practiced law in Nashville in partnership with Colonel Frank Williams. He remained active in politics, serving on the State Democratic Committee and the National Democratic Executive Committee in the late 1860s. He was nominated for the U.S. Senate in 1875, 1877, and 1881, and was an elector for presidential candidate Samuel J. Tilden in 1876.

Throughout the 1870s and early 1880s, Tennessee's state government struggled with debt, which had accumulated over previous decades as the state issued bonds to fund internal improvements and railroad construction. The Panic of 1873 decimated the state's property tax revenue, and the state defaulted on its bond debt in 1875. By the early 1880s, the state Democratic Party had split into two factions over how to resolve the crisis: those who sought full repayment of the debt at all costs to preserve the state's credit (known as the "high tax" or "state credit" Democrats) and those who believed full payment unfeasible and sought only a partial payment (known as the "low tax" Democrats). In the gubernatorial race of 1880, each faction nominated its own candidate, causing the Democratic vote to be split, and allowing Republican Alvin Hawkins to win the election.

== Governor ==
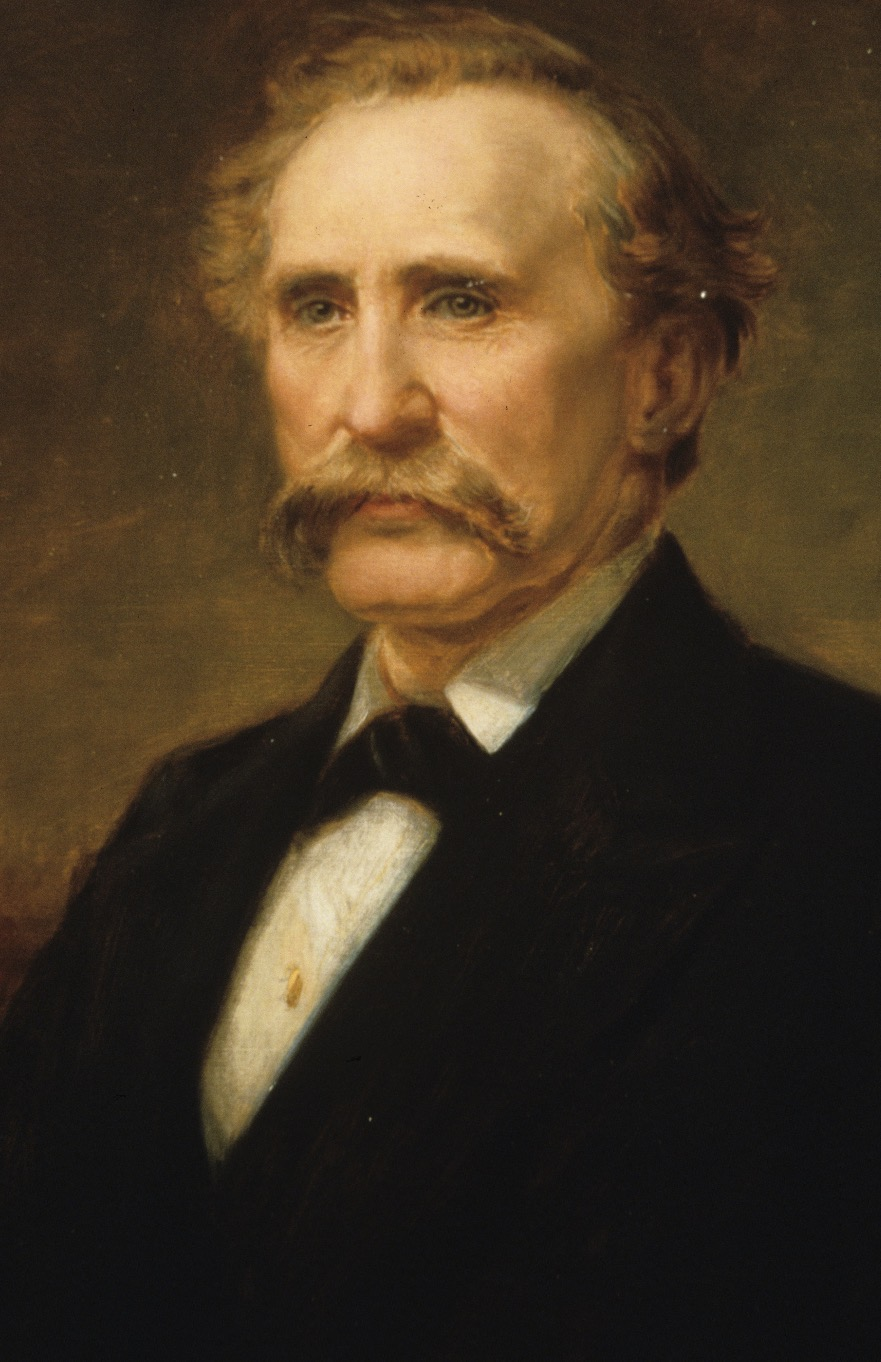
Portrait of Bate by George Dury, c. 1884

In the 1882 gubernatorial race, the state's Bourbon faction, led by former governor Isham Harris, rallied support for the "low tax" faction, which nominated Bate as its candidate. Bate proposed paying 50% on bonds held by railroads (some of which were believed to have been obtained fraudulently during the Brownlow administration), and making full payment on bonds held by schools, charities, and Sarah Childress Polk, the widow of the late President James K. Polk. The "high tax" Democrats nominated their own candidate, Joseph Fussell. On election day, Bate won with 120,637 votes to 93,168 for the incumbent, Hawkins, 9,660 for Greenback candidate John Beasley, and 4,814 for Fussell.

After his inauguration, Bate signed his debt plan into law, finally resolving the debt issue that had dogged the state for over a decade. There was still considerable anger over how the crisis was resolved, however, which threatened Bate's reelection chances in 1884. The Republican candidate, Nashville judge Frank T. Reid, mounted a strong campaign, but Bate won reelection by a vote of 132,201 to 125,246.

During his first term, Bate signed into a law an act creating the State Railroad Commission to regulate railroad rates. Farmers, who deemed railroad freight rates too high, supported this, while railroad companies opposed it. The act creating this commission was repealed in 1885, however, angering farmers, and damaging Democrats' chances of holding onto the governor's office in the 1886 election.

== Later life ==
After Senator Howell Jackson resigned in 1886, Bate appointed Washington C. Whitthorne to complete his term, which was set to expire in March 1887. The Tennessee General Assembly elected Bate to fill this Senate seat. He was reelected in 1893, 1899, and 1905. During his tenure, he served as chairman of the Committee on the Improvement of the Mississippi River and Its Tributaries in the 53rd Congress, and the chairman of the Committee on Public Health and the National Quarantine in two later sessions. He supported lower taxes, and favored funding for common schools, the United States Weather Bureau, and the Army Signal Corps. He voted for the admission of Oklahoma, Arizona, and New Mexico as states.

Shortly after being elected to his fourth term, Bate attended the inauguration of President Theodore Roosevelt on March 4, 1905. He was believed to have caught a cold but died of pneumonia a few days later on March 9. His body was returned to Nashville on a specially chartered train, and he was interred in Mount Olivet Cemetery there. Members of the Frank Cheatham Bivouac, which consisted of surviving Confederate veterans, fired the final salute over his grave.

== Personal life ==
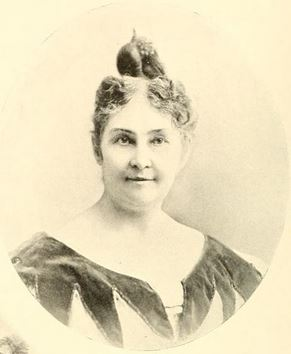
Julia, wife of William B. Bate

Bate married Julia Peete, the daughter of Samuel Peete, a prominent lawyer and scholar of Huntsville, Alabama. She was born in Huntsville and educated in the schools of Alabama and Philadelphia, Pennsylvania. Her marriage to Hon. William B. Bate took place in 1856. During the two successive terms that her husband was Governor of Tennessee, Mrs. Bate presided with grace and dignity over the State Executive Mansion.

In 1889, Bate was elected to the United States Senate, and she accompanied him to Washington. She usually resided there during the sessions of Congress, participating in the social affairs incident to Senatorial life. They had four daughters, two of whom lived to adulthood: Mrs. Thomas F. Mastin, Texas, and Susie, Mrs. O. D. Childs, Los Angeles. Susie Bate had been a much admired young lady in Washington society for several seasons. Mrs Bate was a member of the Methodist church and of several charitable organizations.

Bate's paternal grandfather, Colonel Humphrey Bate (1779–1856), was an early settler in Sumner County. Governor Bate's middle name was the surname of his paternal grandmother (Colonel Humphrey Bate's first wife), Elizabeth Brimage. After the death of Elizabeth Brimage, Colonel Humphrey Bate married Anna Weatherred, sister of Governor Bate's mother, Amanda. Several of Governor Bate's relatives, including his brother, Captain Humphrey Bate (1828–1862), were killed or wounded at the Battle of Shiloh.

Dr. Humphrey Bate (1875–1936), a cousin of Governor Bate, was a noted harmonica player and string band leader. He was one of the first musicians to perform at the Grand Ole Opry in the 1920s.

== See also ==
- List of American Civil War generals (Confederate)
- List of governors of Tennessee
- List of members of the United States Congress who died in office (1900–1949)

== Notes ==
Party political offices
Vacant Title last held by Albert S. Marks	Democratic nominee for Governor of Tennessee; 1884	Succeeded by Robert Love Taylor
Political offices
Preceded by Alvin Hawkins	Governor of Tennessee; 1883–1887	Succeeded by Robert Love Taylor
U.S. Senate
Preceded by Washington C. Whitthorne	U.S. senator (Class 1) from Tennessee; 1887–1905; Served alongside: Isham G. Harris, Thomas B. Turley, Edward W. Carmack	Succeeded by James B. Frazier
