= 1876 United States presidential election in Tennessee =

- November 7, 1876
- Turnout: 17.70% ▲3.47
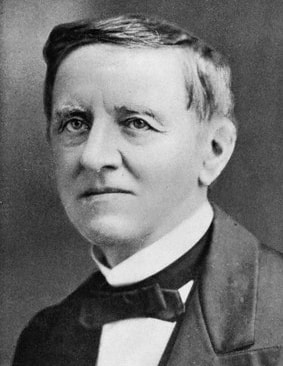

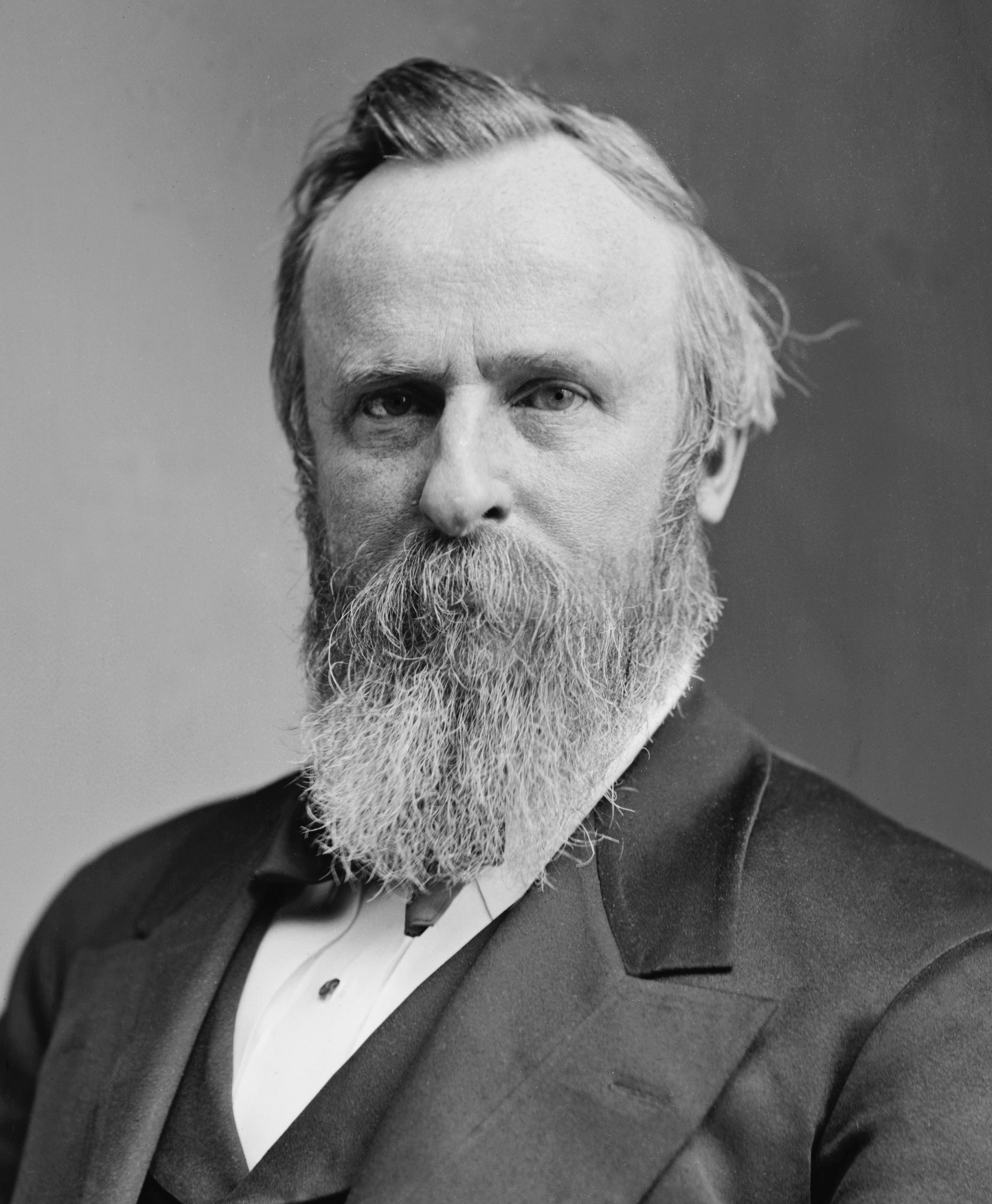
Nominee	Samuel J. Tilden	Rutherford B. Hayes
Party	Democratic	Republican
Home state	New York	Ohio
Running mate	Thomas A. Hendricks	William A. Wheeler
Electoral vote	12	0
Popular vote	133,177	89,566
Percentage	59.79%	40.21%
County results
Tilden
50–60%
60–70%
70–80%
80–90%
90–100%
Hayes
50–60%
60–70%
70–80%
80–90%
Unknown/No Vote
President before election
Ulysses S. Grant
Republican
Elected President
Rutherford B. Hayes
Republican

The 1876 United States presidential election in Tennessee took place on November 7, 1876, as part of the 1876 United States presidential election. Tennessee voters chose twelve representatives, or electors, to the Electoral College, who voted for president and vice president.

Tennessee was won by Samuel J. Tilden, the former governor of New York (D–New York), running with Thomas A. Hendricks, the governor of Indiana and future vice president, with 59.79% of the popular vote, against Rutherford B. Hayes, the governor of Ohio (R-Ohio), running with Representative William A. Wheeler, with 40.21% of the vote.

This election was the last when the Unionist Highland Rim counties of Henderson and Wayne voted for a Democratic presidential candidate.

== Results ==
1876 United States presidential election in Tennessee
Party	Candidate	Running mate	Popular vote		Electoral vote	
Party	Candidate	Running mate	Count	%	Count	%
Democratic	Samuel J. Tilden of New York	Thomas A. Hendricks of Indiana	133,177	59.79%	12	100.00%
Republican	Rutherford B. Hayes of Ohio	William A. Wheeler of New York	89,566	40.21%	0	0.00%
Total			222,743	100.00%	12	100.00%

== See also ==
- United States presidential elections in Tennessee
- 1876 Tennessee gubernatorial election
