= Tomlinson Fort (Tennessee politician) =

American politician

Mayor of Chattanooga
- In office 1876–1876
- Preceded by: John W. James
- Succeeded by: Eli M. Wight

Personal details
- Born: April 26, 1839 Milledgeville, Georgia
- Died: December 4, 1910 (aged 71)
- Relations: Tomlinson Fort (father)

Tomlinson Fort (April 26, 1839 – December 4, 1910) was mayor of Chattanooga, Tennessee in 1876.

Fort was born in Milledgeville, Georgia, the son of U.S. Representative Tomlinson Fort. He served as a colonel in the Confederate Army during the American Civil War. He was elected mayor in 1875 and served during 1876.

He died in Chattanooga in 1910, and was buried in Memory Hill Cemetery in Milledgeville, Georgia.
