= Hundred Oaks Castle =

Mansion in Winchester, Tennessee, U.S.

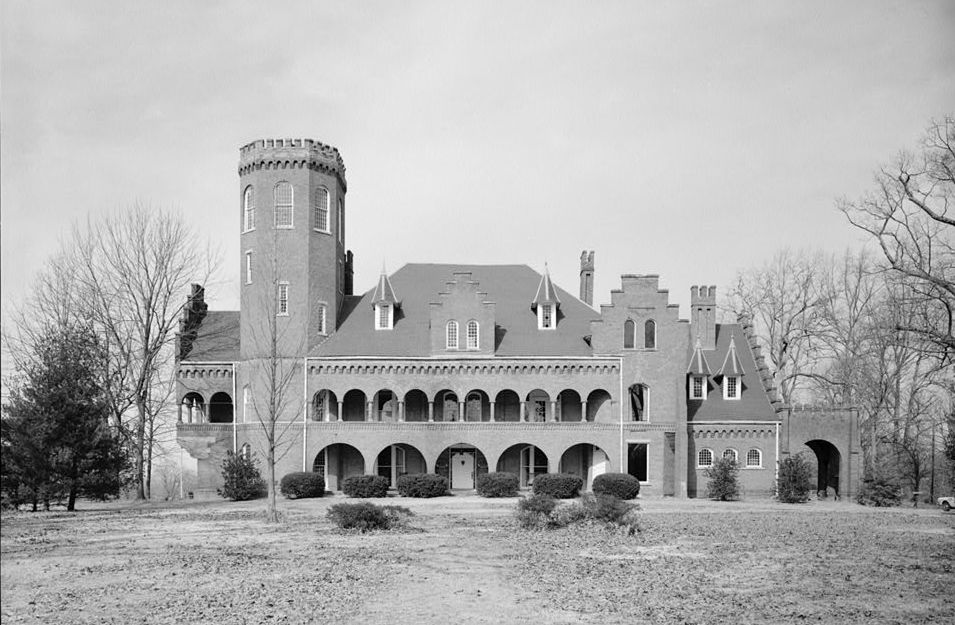
- The Hundred Oaks Castle in 1983
- Interactive map of the Hundred Oaks Castle area

General information
- Location: Winchester, Tennessee, United States
- Coordinates: 35°10′46″N 86°7′21″W
- Construction started: 1830
- Completed: 1889

The Hundred Oaks Castle is a historic mansion in Winchester, Tennessee, U.S.

== History ==
The house was built for Peter S Decherd, a lawyer from Virginia who eventually founded Decherd, Tennessee. Its construction began in 1830 on a two-story plantation. In the 1860s, it was acquired by Albert S. Marks, who served as the Governor of Tennessee from 1879 to 1881. It was named Hundred Oaks by his son Arthur and his daughter-in-law, Mary Hunt, after Arthur counted 100 oak trees on the property. Arthur became a US diplomat in his early 20s which allowed him to travel to Europe. His love for castles emanated at that point. When he returned in 1889 to his home in Winchester, he immediately wanted to transform his family's home into a castle. Now calling it Hundred Oaks Castle. Arthur's life was short lived and he passed due to Typhoid Fever in 1892

The house was a monastery for Paulist Fathers for five decades, until 1954. Between 1954 and the early 1990s, the castle changed hands quite a few times, even becoming a museum and restaurant in the late 1970s It later became the Franklin County Adult Activity Center. It was damaged due to a fire in 1990. In 1996, it was purchased by the Bramlett Family Foundation, who restored it as a dedication to their late son Kent Bramlett.

Throughout the years, the Bramlett Family allowed tours however during and after the COVID pandemic tours have not been available.
