= 1882 Tennessee gubernatorial election =

- November 7, 1882
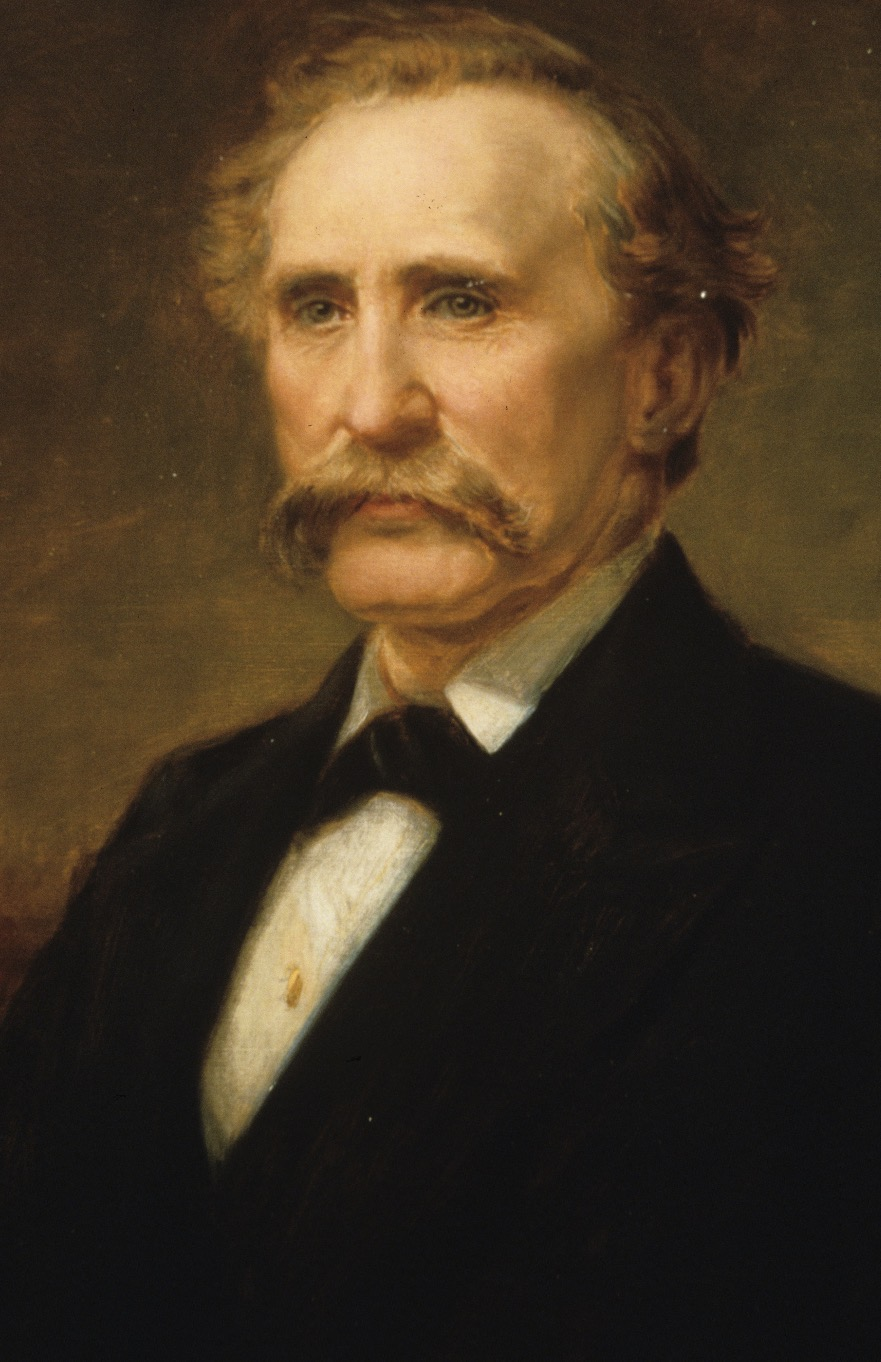

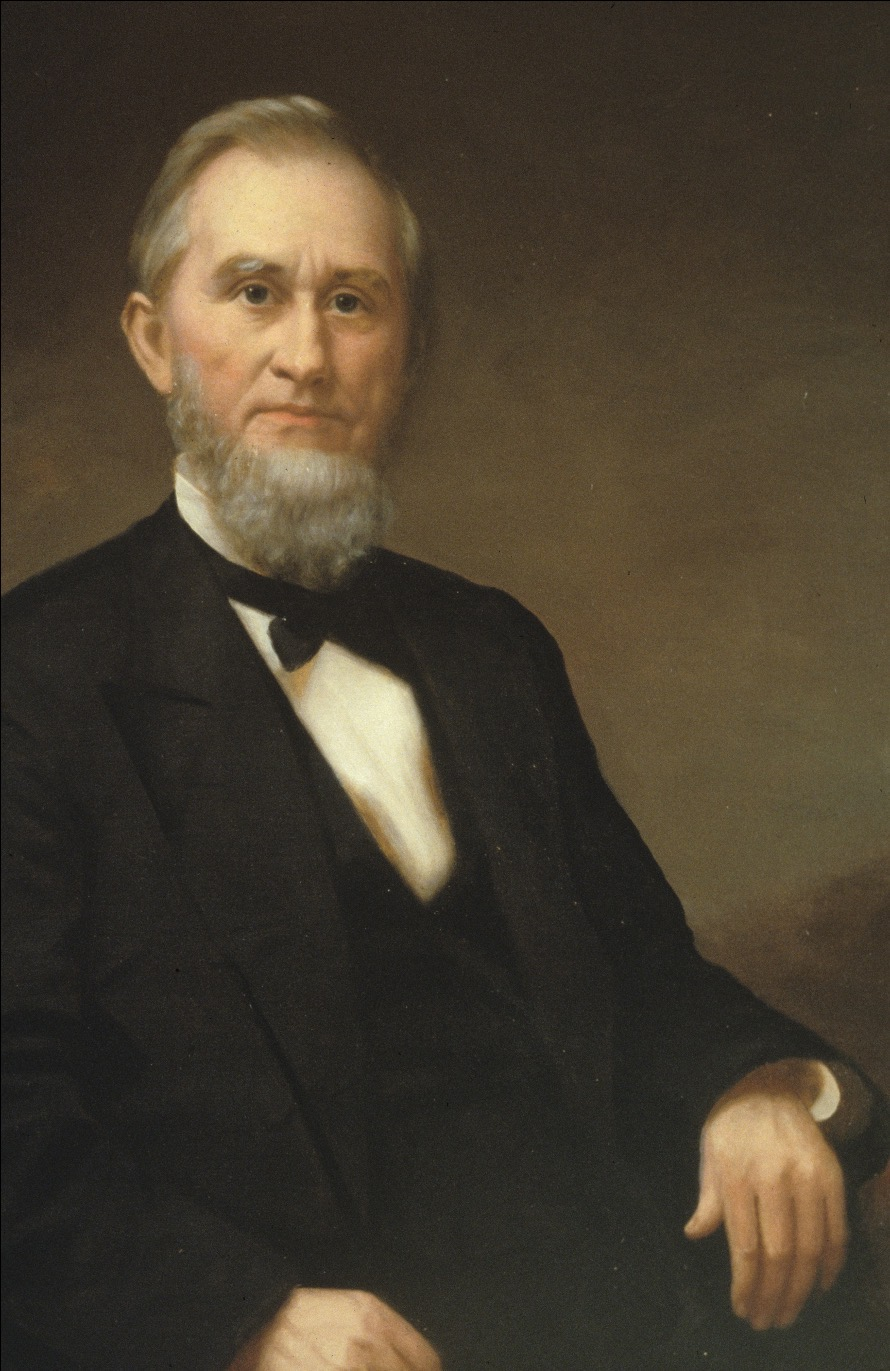
Nominee	William B. Bate	Alvin Hawkins
Party	Low Tax Democrat	Republican
Popular vote	120,637	93,168
Percentage	52.85%	40.81%
- County results Bate: 40–50% 50–60% 60–70% 70–80% 80–90% Hawkins: 40–50% 50–60% 60–70% 70–80% 80–90% >90%
Governor before election
Alvin Hawkins
Republican
Elected Governor
William B. Bate
Low Tax Democrat

The 1882 Tennessee gubernatorial election was held on November 7, 1882, to elect the Governor of Tennessee. Incumbent Republican Governor Alvin Hawkins lost re-election against Democratic nominee and former member of the Tennessee House of Representatives William B. Bate.

William B. Bate was sworn in as the 23rd Governor of Tennessee on January 15, 1883.

== Aftermath ==
Although Hawkins failed to win re-election, he was praised by members of both parties for running an honest government, helping to erase the stigma attached to the Republican Party as a result of the Brownlow administration's radical post-war policies. Hawkins also enacted several judicial and educational reforms.

== General election ==
Tennessee gubernatorial election, 1882
Party	Candidate	Votes	%
Democratic	William B. Bate	120,637	52.85
Republican	Alvin Hawkins (incumbent)	93,168	40.81
Greenback	J. R. Beasley	9,660	4.23
Debt-Paying Democrat	J. H. Fussell	4,814	2.11
Total votes		228,279	100.00
Democratic gain from Republican			
