= 1884 Tennessee gubernatorial election =

- November 4, 1884
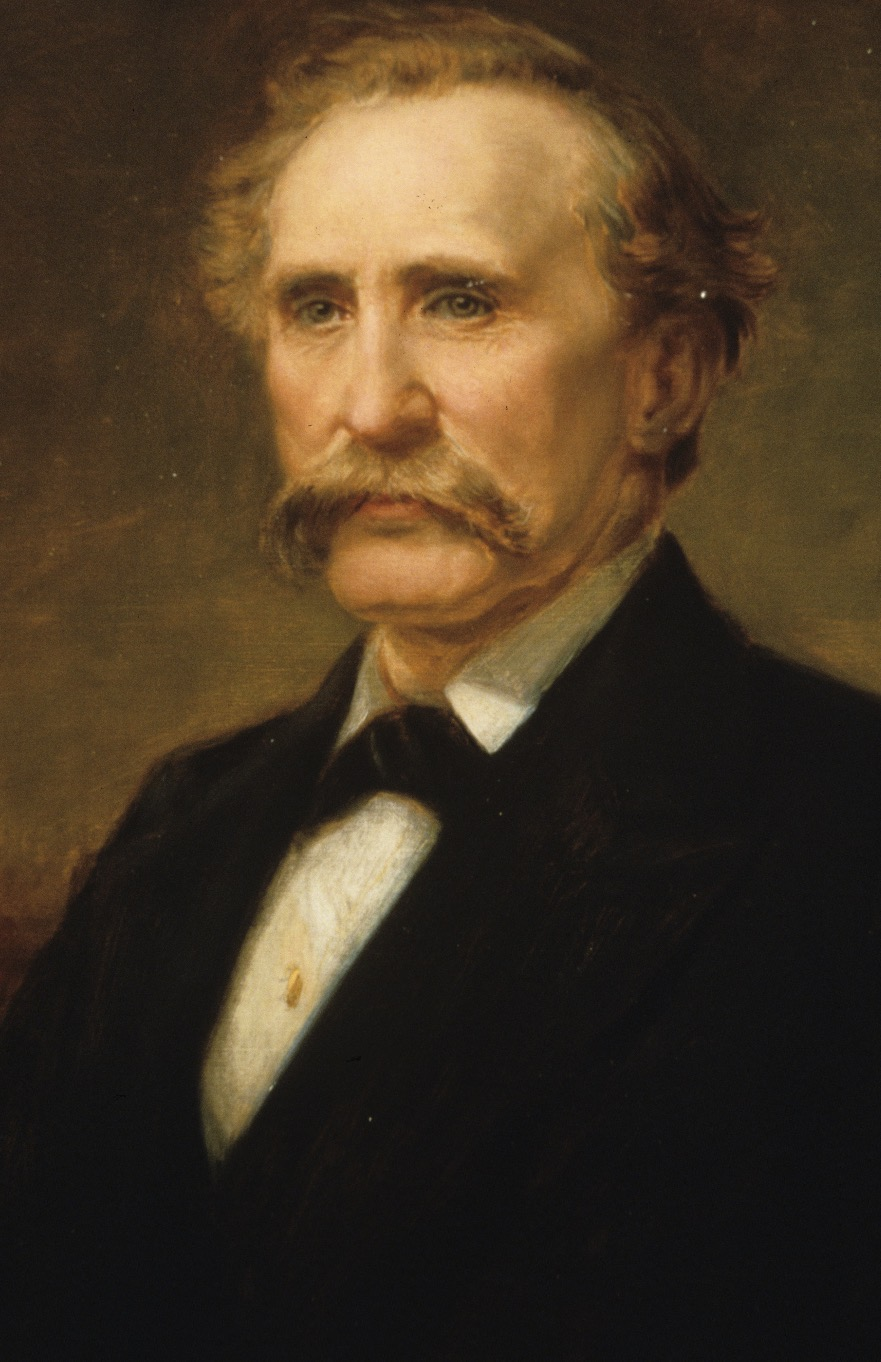

Nominee	William B. Bate	Frank T. Reid
Party	Democratic	Republican
Popular vote	132,201	125,246
Percentage	51.24%	48.55%
- County results Bate: 50–60% 60–70% 70–80% 80–90% >90% Reid: 50–60% 60–70% 70–80% 80–90% >90% No data
Governor before election
William B. Bate
Democratic
Elected Governor
William B. Bate
Democratic

The 1884 Tennessee gubernatorial election was held on November 4, 1884. Incumbent Democratic governor William B. Bate defeated Republican nominee Frank T. Reid with 51.24% of the vote.

== Background ==
After Governor Bate's inauguration, he signed his debt plan into law, finally resolving the debt issue that had dogged the state for over a decade. There was still considerable anger over how the crisis was resolved, however, which threatened Bate's re-election chances in 1884. The Republican candidate, Nashville judge Frank T. Reid, mounted a strong campaign, but Bate won re-election by a vote of 132,201 to 125,246.

== General election ==
=== Candidates ===
Major party candidates

- William B. Bate, Democratic
- Frank T. Reid, Republican

Other candidates

- (FNU) Buchanan, Greenback

=== Results ===
1884 Tennessee gubernatorial election
Party	Candidate	Votes	%	±%
Democratic	William B. Bate (incumbent)	132,201	51.24%	
Republican	Frank T. Reid	125,246	48.55%	
Greenback	(FNU) Buchanan	549	0.21%	
Majority		6,955		
Turnout		257,996		
Democratic hold		Swing		

== See also ==
- 1884 United States presidential election in Tennessee
