= 1884 United States presidential election in Tennessee =

- November 4, 1884
- Turnout: 16.86% of the total population ▲1.03 pp

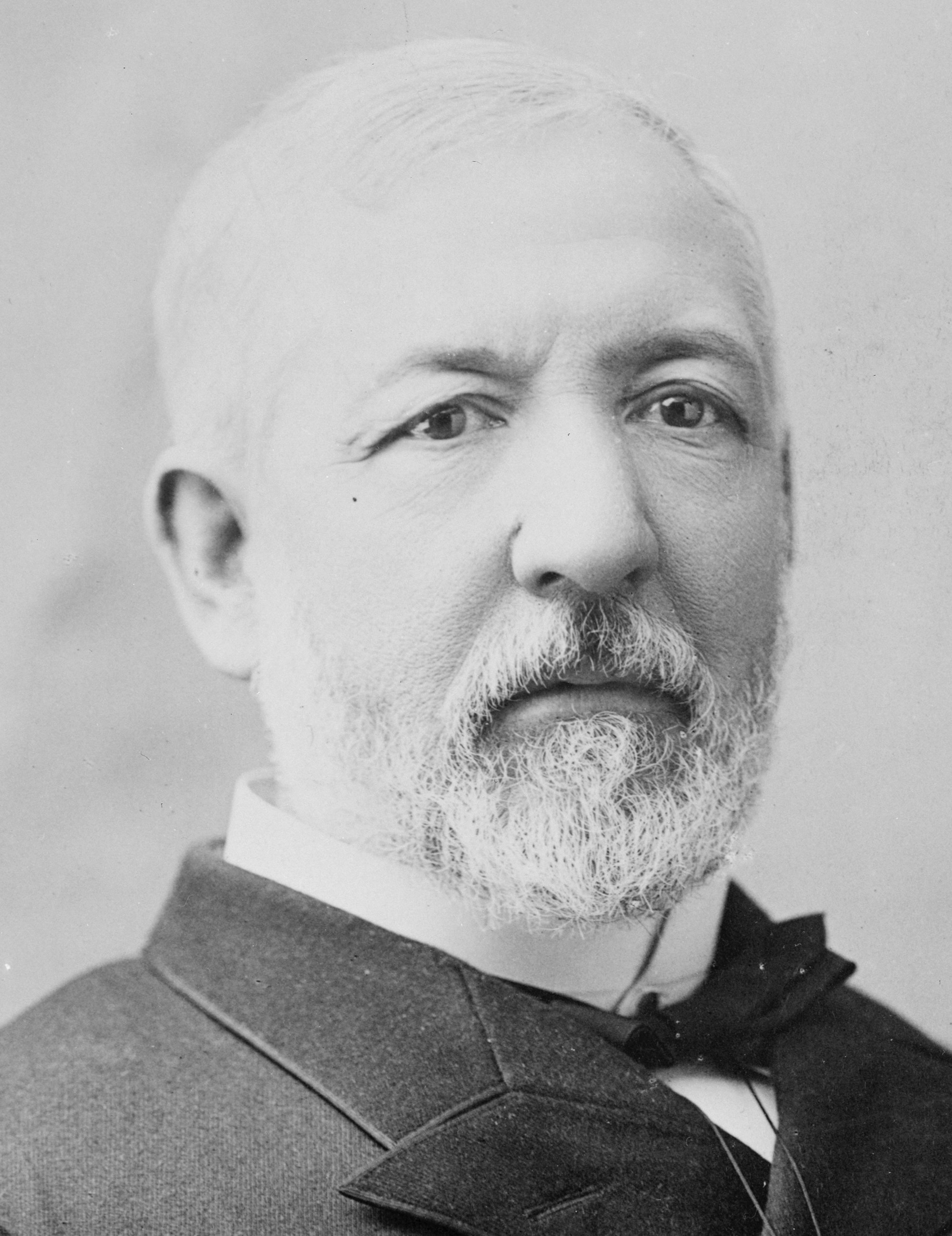
Nominee	Grover Cleveland	James G. Blaine
Party	Democratic	Republican
Home state	New York	Maine
Running mate	Thomas A. Hendricks	John A. Logan
Electoral vote	12	0
Popular vote	133,770	124,101
Percentage	51.45%	47.74%
County results
Cleveland
40–50%
50–60%
60–70%
70–80%
80–90%
90–100%
Blaine
50–60%
60–70%
70–80%
80–90%
Unknown/No Vote
President before election
Chester A. Arthur
Republican
Elected President
Grover Cleveland
Democratic

The 1884 United States presidential election in Tennessee took place on November 4, 1884, as part of the 1884 United States presidential election. Tennessee voters chose 12 representatives, or electors, to the Electoral College, who voted for president and vice president.

For over a century after Civil War, Tennessee's white citizenry was divided according to partisan loyalties established in that war. Unionist regions covering almost all of East Tennessee, Kentucky Pennyroyal-allied Macon County, and the five West Tennessee Highland Rim counties of Carroll, Henderson, McNairy, Hardin and Wayne voted Republican – generally by landslide margins – as they saw the Democratic Party as the “war party” who had forced them into a war they did not wish to fight. Contrariwise, the rest of Middle and West Tennessee who had supported and driven the state's secession was equally fiercely Democratic as it associated the Republicans with Reconstruction. After the state's white landowning class re-established its rule in the early 1870s, blacks and Unionist whites nonetheless forged adequate support for the GOP to produce a competitive political system for two decades, although during this era the Republicans could only capture statewide offices when the Democratic Party was divided on this issue of payment of state debt.

White Democrats in West Tennessee were always aiming to eliminate black political influence, and during the 1880s they attempted to do this by election fraud and stuffing of ballot boxes. However, at this stage the Republican Party was a strong force throughout the state and the Democratic Party had not yet achieved a monopoly in power in secessionist areas, with its statewide vote not rising above sixty percent in any year's congressional race.

Tennessee was won by the Democratic nominees, Governor Grover Cleveland of New York and his running mate former Senator and Governor Thomas A. Hendricks of Indiana. Cleveland and Hendricks defeated the Republican nominees, former Secretary of State and Senator James G. Blaine of Maine and his running mate Senator John A. Logan of Illinois, with 51.45% of the vote.

This would be the last occasion Shelby County voted for a Republican presidential candidate until Dwight D. Eisenhower in 1956, the last occasion Fayette County did so until Richard Nixon in 1960, and the last occasion Haywood County voted Republican until Barry Goldwater in 1964.

== Results ==
1884 United States presidential election in Tennessee
Party	Candidate	Running mate	Popular vote		Electoral vote	
Party	Candidate	Running mate	Count	%	Count	%
Democratic	Grover Cleveland of New York	Thomas A. Hendricks of Indiana	133,770	51.45%	12	100.00%
Republican	James G. Blaine of Maine	John A. Logan of Illinois	124,101	47.74%	0	0.00%
Prohibition	John St. John of Kansas	William Daniel of Maryland	1,150	0.44%	0	0.00%
Greenback	Benjamin Butler of Massachusetts	Absolom M. West of Mississippi	957	0.37%	0	0.00%
Total			259,978	100.00%	12	100.00%

=== Results by county ===
1884 United States presidential election in Tennessee by county
County	Grover Cleveland Democratic		James G. Blaine Republican		Various candidates Other parties		Margin		Total votes cast
County	#	%	#	%	#	%	#	%	Total votes cast
Anderson	604	29.29%	1,456	70.61%	2	0.10%	-852	-41.32%	2,062
Bedford	2,053	50.89%	1,882	46.65%	99	2.45%	171	4.24%	4,034
Benton	1,054	62.93%	599	35.76%	22	1.31%	455	27.16%	1,675
Bledsoe	416	42.11%	572	57.89%	0	0.00%	-156	-15.79%	988
Blount	849	31.35%	1,823	67.32%	36	1.33%	-974	-35.97%	2,708
Bradley	892	40.33%	1,304	58.95%	16	0.72%	-412	-18.63%	2,212
Campbell	399	22.18%	1,394	77.49%	6	0.33%	-995	-55.31%	1,799
Cannon	1,011	64.48%	515	32.84%	42	2.68%	496	31.63%	1,568
Carroll	1,850	43.81%	2,319	54.91%	54	1.28%	-469	-11.11%	4,223
Carter	407	20.51%	1,575	79.39%	2	0.10%	-1,168	-58.87%	1,984
Cheatham	959	73.71%	335	25.75%	7	0.54%	624	47.96%	1,301
Claiborne	921	39.85%	1,390	60.15%	0	0.00%	-469	-20.29%	2,311
Clay	628	63.76%	333	33.81%	24	2.44%	295	29.95%	985
Cocke	875	35.28%	1,587	63.99%	18	0.73%	-712	-28.71%	2,480
Coffee	1,597	79.61%	376	18.74%	33	1.65%	1,221	60.87%	2,006
Crockett	1,404	52.17%	1,256	46.67%	31	1.15%	148	5.50%	2,691
Cumberland	312	38.81%	488	60.70%	4	0.50%	-176	-21.89%	804
Davidson	8,165	49.88%	8,111	49.55%	94	0.57%	54	0.33%	16,370
DeKalb	1,409	55.25%	1,117	43.80%	24	0.94%	292	11.45%	2,550
Decatur	734	52.02%	653	46.28%	24	1.70%	81	5.74%	1,411
Dickson	1,339	69.99%	561	29.33%	13	0.68%	778	40.67%	1,913
Dyer	1,542	70.41%	609	27.81%	39	1.78%	933	42.60%	2,190
Fayette	1,729	39.60%	2,637	60.40%	0	0.00%	-908	-20.80%	4,366
Fentress	220	32.64%	454	67.36%	0	0.00%	-234	-34.72%	674
Franklin	2,091	75.79%	615	22.29%	53	1.92%	1,476	53.50%	2,759
Gibson	3,210	60.55%	1,999	37.71%	92	1.74%	1,211	22.84%	5,301
Giles	2,775	54.70%	2,278	44.90%	20	0.39%	497	9.80%	5,073
Grainger	840	39.03%	1,303	60.55%	9	0.42%	-463	-21.51%	2,152
Greene	2,111	45.09%	2,507	53.55%	64	1.37%	-396	-8.46%	4,682
Grundy	585	75.68%	188	24.32%	0	0.00%	397	51.36%	773
Hamblen	875	44.19%	1,072	54.14%	33	1.67%	-197	-9.95%	1,980
Hamilton	2,439	38.60%	3,827	60.56%	53	0.84%	-1,388	-21.97%	6,319
Hancock	425	28.79%	1,049	71.07%	2	0.14%	-624	-42.28%	1,476
Hardeman	1,940	60.51%	1,226	38.24%	40	1.25%	714	22.27%	3,206
Hardin	1,087	41.03%	1,546	58.36%	16	0.60%	-459	-17.33%	2,649
Hawkins	1,529	43.61%	1,973	56.27%	4	0.11%	-444	-12.66%	3,506
Haywood	1,842	39.94%	2,768	60.02%	2	0.04%	-926	-20.08%	4,612
Henderson	1,478	47.39%	1,629	52.23%	12	0.38%	-151	-4.84%	3,119
Henry	1,941	62.35%	1,139	36.59%	33	1.06%	802	25.76%	3,113
Hickman	1,135	60.63%	709	37.87%	28	1.50%	426	22.76%	1,872
Houston	630	78.36%	174	21.64%	0	0.00%	456	56.72%	804
Humphreys	1,484	82.72%	285	15.89%	25	1.39%	1,199	66.83%	1,794
Jackson	1,380	82.19%	281	16.74%	18	1.07%	1,099	65.46%	1,679
James	254	33.29%	504	66.06%	5	0.66%	-250	-32.77%	763
Jefferson	736	27.35%	1,909	70.94%	46	1.71%	-1,173	-43.59%	2,691
Johnson	179	13.95%	1,101	85.81%	3	0.23%	-922	-71.86%	1,283
Knox	3,481	39.21%	5,248	59.11%	149	1.68%	-1,767	-19.90%	8,878
Lake	367	97.61%	8	2.13%	1	0.27%	359	95.48%	376
Lauderdale	1,488	51.85%	1,330	46.34%	52	1.81%	158	5.51%	2,870
Lawrence	953	60.78%	611	38.97%	4	0.26%	342	21.81%	1,568
Lewis	209	76.28%	64	23.36%	1	0.36%	145	52.92%	274
Lincoln	2,780	73.45%	949	25.07%	56	1.48%	1,831	48.38%	3,785
Loudon	487	32.49%	1,009	67.31%	3	0.20%	-522	-34.82%	1,499
Macon	619	43.17%	810	56.49%	5	0.35%	-191	-13.32%	1,434
Madison	2,393	55.01%	1,901	43.70%	56	1.29%	492	11.31%	4,350
Marion	901	44.87%	1,107	55.13%	0	0.00%	-206	-10.26%	2,008
Marshall	2,084	73.07%	728	25.53%	40	1.40%	1,356	47.55%	2,852
Maury	3,148	52.50%	2,818	47.00%	30	0.50%	330	5.50%	5,996
McMinn	1,293	43.64%	1,663	56.13%	7	0.24%	-370	-12.49%	2,963
McNairy	1,436	51.36%	1,312	46.92%	48	1.72%	124	4.43%	2,796
Meigs	679	56.12%	524	43.31%	7	0.58%	155	12.81%	1,210
Monroe	1,258	52.61%	1,120	46.84%	13	0.54%	138	5.77%	2,391
Montgomery	2,516	56.37%	1,922	43.07%	25	0.56%	594	13.31%	4,463
Moore	906	93.31%	53	5.46%	12	1.24%	853	87.85%	971
Morgan	300	32.75%	607	66.27%	9	0.98%	-307	-33.52%	916
Obion	2,509	71.67%	939	26.82%	53	1.51%	1,570	44.84%	3,501
Overton	1,179	73.55%	421	26.26%	3	0.19%	758	47.29%	1,603
Perry	715	61.53%	447	38.47%	0	0.00%	268	23.06%	1,162
Pickett	275	49.19%	284	50.81%	0	0.00%	-9	-1.61%	559
Polk	704	56.77%	533	42.98%	3	0.24%	171	13.79%	1,240
Putnam	1,063	65.70%	551	34.05%	4	0.25%	512	31.64%	1,618
Rhea	912	54.58%	755	45.18%	4	0.24%	157	9.40%	1,671
Roane	808	30.47%	1,843	69.49%	1	0.04%	-1,035	-39.03%	2,652
Robertson	1,977	71.01%	794	28.52%	13	0.47%	1,183	42.49%	2,784
Rutherford	2,828	57.67%	2,040	41.60%	36	0.73%	788	16.07%	4,904
Scott	130	11.83%	969	88.17%	0	0.00%	-839	-76.34%	1,099
Sequatchie	284	66.20%	142	33.10%	3	0.70%	142	33.10%	429
Sevier	468	17.17%	2,242	82.25%	16	0.59%	-1,774	-65.08%	2,726
Shelby	7,626	45.38%	9,165	54.54%	13	0.08%	-1,539	-9.16%	16,804
Smith	1,592	63.83%	880	35.28%	22	0.88%	712	28.55%	2,494
Stewart	1,336	70.80%	530	28.09%	21	1.11%	806	42.71%	1,887
Sullivan	2,176	61.99%	1,298	36.98%	36	1.03%	878	25.01%	3,510
Sumner	2,225	69.71%	945	29.61%	22	0.69%	1,280	40.10%	3,192
Tipton	1,922	50.62%	1,868	49.20%	7	0.18%	54	1.42%	3,797
Trousdale	584	71.22%	226	27.56%	10	1.22%	358	43.66%	820
Unicoi	91	14.00%	559	86.00%	0	0.00%	-468	-72.00%	650
Union	530	28.63%	1,321	71.37%	0	0.00%	-791	-42.73%	1,851
Van Buren	348	85.29%	59	14.46%	1	0.25%	289	70.83%	408
Warren	1,754	76.10%	532	23.08%	19	0.82%	1,222	53.02%	2,305
Washington	1,559	46.21%	1,815	53.79%	0	0.00%	-256	-7.59%	3,374
Wayne	668	37.26%	1,124	62.69%	1	0.06%	-456	-25.43%	1,793
Weakley	2,293	58.18%	1,606	40.75%	42	1.07%	687	17.43%	3,941
White	1,365	81.01%	315	18.69%	5	0.30%	1,050	62.31%	1,685
Williamson	2,025	57.66%	1,461	41.60%	26	0.74%	564	16.06%	3,512
Wilson	2,191	62.49%	1,234	35.20%	81	2.31%	957	27.30%	3,506
Totals	133,770	51.45%	124,110	47.74%	2,108	0.81%	9,660	3.72%	259,988

== See also ==
- United States presidential elections in Tennessee
- 1884 Tennessee gubernatorial election
