= 1874 Tennessee gubernatorial election =

- November 3, 1874
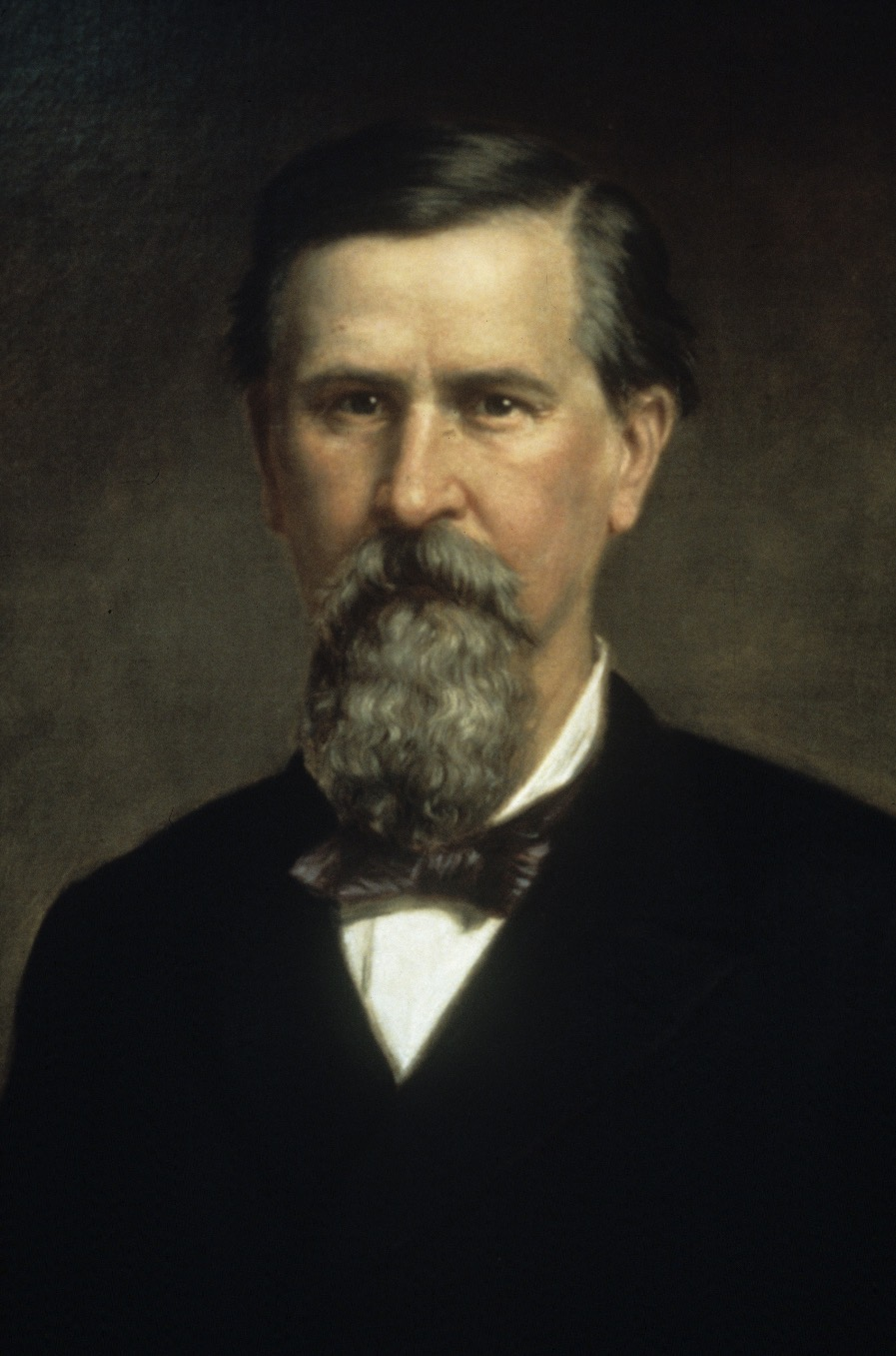

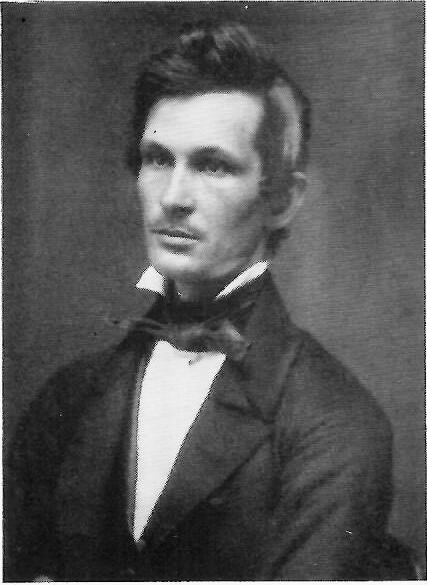
Nominee	James D. Porter	Horace Maynard
Party	Democratic	Republican
Popular vote	105,061	55,847
Percentage	65.20%	34.66%
- County results Porter: 50–60% 60–70% 70–80% 80–90% >90% Maynard: 50–60% 60–70% 70–80% 80–90% >90% No data
Governor before election
John C. Brown
Democratic
Elected Governor
James D. Porter
Democratic

The 1874 Tennessee gubernatorial election was held on November 3, 1874, to elect the next governor of Tennessee. Incumbent Democratic governor John C. Brown did not seek re-election. Democratic candidate James D. Porter defeated Republican congressman Horace Maynard with 65.20% of the vote.

== General election ==
1874 Tennessee gubernatorial election
Party	Candidate	Votes	%	±%
Democratic	James D. Porter	105,061	65.20	
Republican	Horace Maynard	55,847	34.66	
Greenback	B. F. Brooks	222	0.14	
Total votes		161,130	100.00	

== See also ==
- 1874 United States House of Representatives elections in Tennessee
