= Albert S. Marks =

American politician (1836–1891)

Albert Smith Marks
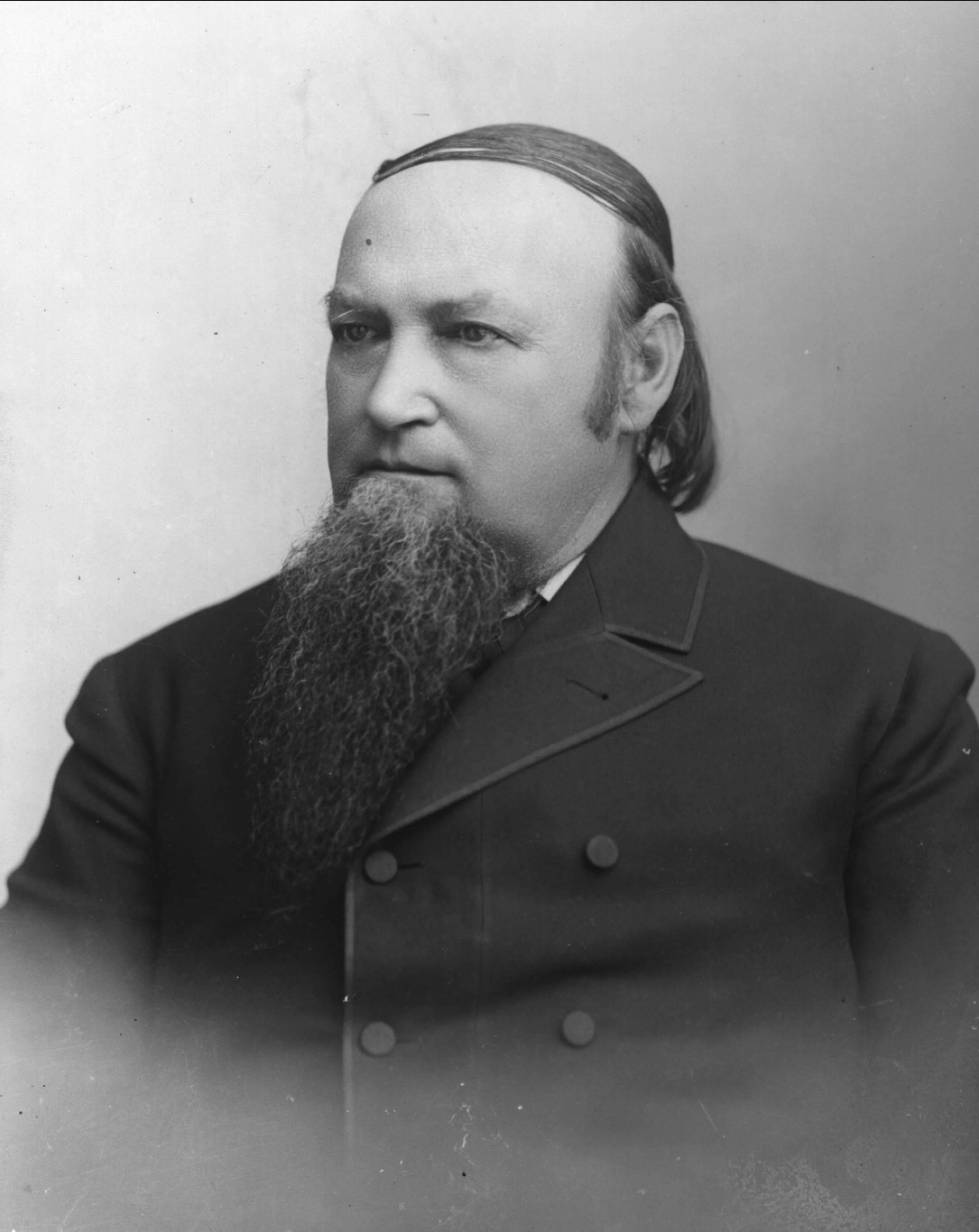
- Photograph of Marks by the Calvert Brothers

21st Governor of Tennessee
- In office February 16, 1879 – January 17, 1881
- Preceded by: James D. Porter
- Succeeded by: Alvin Hawkins

Personal details
- Born: October 16, 1836 Owensboro, Kentucky, U.S.
- Died: November 4, 1891 (aged 55) Nashville, Tennessee, U.S.
- Resting place: Winchester City Cemetery, Winchester, Tennessee
- Party: Democratic
- Spouse: Novella Davis (m. 1863)
- Profession: Attorney

Military service
- Allegiance: Confederate States of America
- Branch/service: Confederate States Army
- Years of service: 1861–1865
- Rank: Colonel
- Commands: 17th Tennessee Infantry
- Battles/wars: American Civil War • Camp Wildcat (1861) • Mill Springs (1862) • Munfordville (1862) • Stones River (1862)

Albert Smith Marks (October 16, 1836 – November 4, 1891) was an American attorney, soldier and politician. He was the 21st governor of Tennessee from 1879 to 1881. Prior to that, he had served as a state chancery court judge. Marks fought for the Confederacy during the Civil War, and part of his leg was amputated as a result of a wound suffered at the Battle of Stones River in 1862.

== Early life ==
Marks was born in Owensboro, Kentucky, one of seven children of Elisha Marks and Elizabeth (Lashbrook) Marks. His parents were pious Methodists, and initially wanted Albert to become a minister. He attended school in Owensboro until the age of 14, when his father died, and he focused on helping his mother maintain the family farm. Although he had little formal education afterward, he was an avid reader, and poured through multiple books on history and ancient literature.

When he was 19, Marks moved to Winchester, Tennessee, to work in the law firm of his mother's cousin, Arthur S. Colyar. He read law with Colyar, and was admitted to the bar in 1858. The firm then practiced under the name Colyar, Marks and Frizzell. After Frizzell withdrew in 1861, the firm continued as Colyar and Marks.

== Civil War ==
Although he was a Southern Democrat, Marks was an opponent of secession. In early 1861, he ran as the pro-Union candidate for his district's representative to the state's proposed convention on secession, and canvassed with his opponent, future governor Peter Turney. When war broke out, Marks nevertheless joined the Confederate Army. He was elected captain of Company E, 17th Tennessee Infantry, which was initially under the command of Felix K. Zollicoffer, and saw action at the battles of Camp Wildcat (October 1861) and Mill Springs (January 1862) in Kentucky. After Zollicoffer's death in the latter engagement, the 17th was reassigned to General Bushrod Johnson's forces. In May 1862, Marks was promoted to major.

During a reorganization of Confederate forces in June 1862, Marks was promoted to colonel, and placed in command of the 17th. His regiment was assigned to General Simon B. Buckner's division, which launched an invasion of Kentucky in the Fall of 1862. Marks's regiment fought at the Battle of Munfordville, where was he chosen by Buckner to accept the formal surrender of Union forces. Following this invasion, the 17th was assigned to General Patrick Cleburne's division, with which it fought at the Battle of Stones River on December 31, 1862. As Marks's regiment charged a Union battery during this engagement, his right leg was shattered by canister shot, and was subsequently amputated below the knee.

Marks spent most of the remainder of the war convalescing in Winchester and at a hospital in LaGrange, Georgia, though he later joined General Nathan B. Forrest's staff as a judge advocate. After the war, he practiced law with Colyar in Winchester until 1866, when Colyar moved to Nashville. He then formed a firm with partners James Fitzpatrick and T.D. Gregory.

== Governor ==
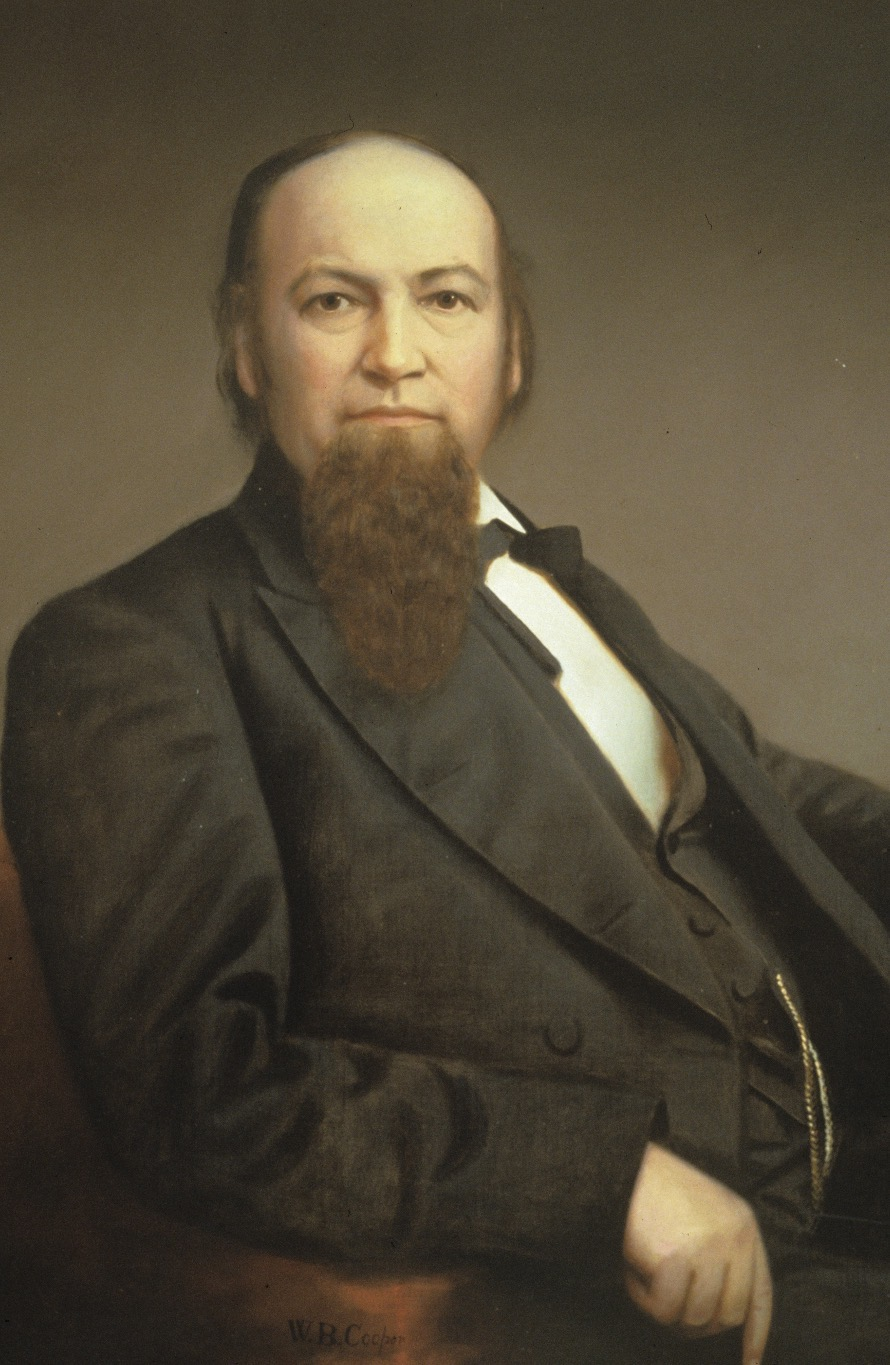
Portrait of Marks as governor by Washington B. Cooper, c. 1880

Marks was elected judge of the state's Fourth Chancery District in 1870. He was reelected in 1878, but resigned after receiving the Democratic Party's nomination for governor later that year. In the general election, he won easily, receiving 89,958 votes to 42,284 votes for the Republican candidate, Chattanooga Mayor Eli M. Wight, and 15,155 votes for the Greenback candidate, Richard M. Edwards of Cleveland. Marks was the first lifelong Democrat to be elected after the Civil War (his two predecessors, John C. Brown and James D. Porter, had been Whigs before the war).

Like his two immediate predecessors, the major issue confronting the Marks administration was the state's debt crisis, which had resulted from the gradual accumulation of bonded debt to pay for internal improvements and railroad construction over the previous four decades. The Panic of 1873 had greatly reduced property tax revenue, and the state had defaulted on its bond payments in 1875. Furthermore, a Yellow Fever epidemic had decimated Memphis, putting more strains on the economy. By the time Marks took office, his party had split into two factions— those who favored full repayment of the debt to protect the state's credit, and those who favored only partial repayment.

Marks appointed a legislative committee to investigate the debt issue. The committee determined that railroad agents had acted unethically during the Brownlow administration, and had attempted to defraud the state, and thus should only be entitled to partial repayment. Marks agreed, and a new repayment plan was negotiated with banks. When this plan was put before the state's voters, however, they soundly rejected it by a vote of 76,333 to 49,772, leaving the issue unresolved.

Marks did not seek reelection in 1880, realizing his party was still badly split over the debt issue. The divided Democrats were defeated in the general election for governor later that year.

== Later life ==
Following his gubernatorial term, Marks formed a new law partnership with Colyar and John Childress Jr., known as Colyar, Marks and Childress. This firm operated until 1883. Marks remained active in politics in his later years. He was an elector for the Democratic presidential ticket for Tennessee's at-large district in 1888, and attended the Democratic National Convention later that year.

Marks died at the Maxwell House Hotel in Nashville on November 4, 1891. He was interred in the Winchester City Cemetery.

== Family and legacy ==
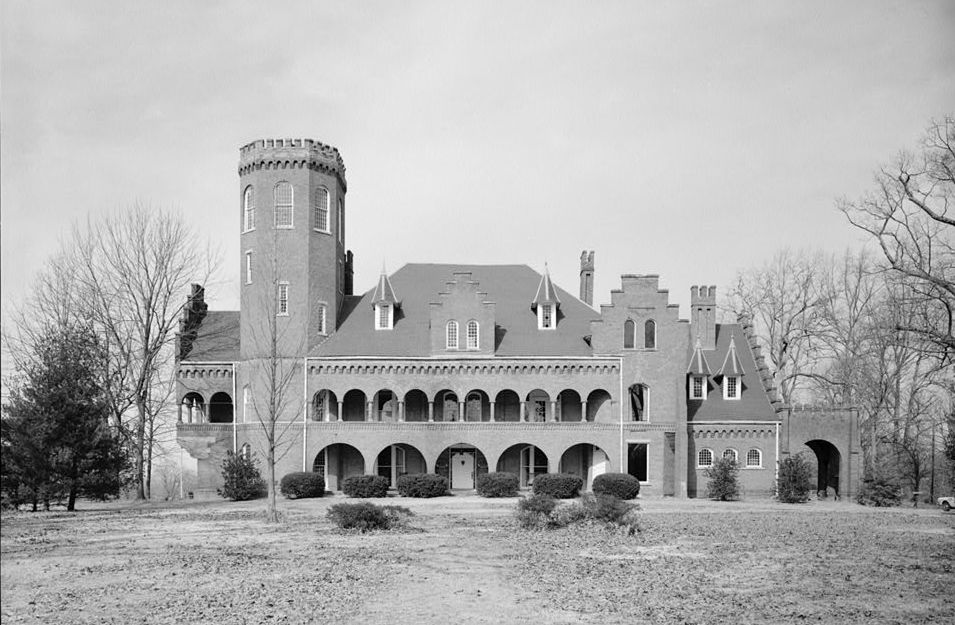
Hundred Oaks

Marks married Novella Davis in 1863, while he was recovering from his injury received at the Battle of Stones River. They had become engaged prior to this battle, and after his leg was amputated, he offered to release her from the engagement, but she refused. They had two children, Arthur Handly Marks and Albert Davis Marks.

Marks lived on a plantation near Winchester he had purchased around 1870. In 1889, his son, Arthur, began building a massive house at this plantation that became known as Hundred Oaks Castle. Sent Hundred Oaks was occupied by the Catholic Paulist Fathers throughout the first half of the 20th century. The house was placed on the National Register of Historic Places in 1975 and documented by the Historic American Buildings Survey in the mid-1980s, and is currently maintained by the non-profit Kent Bramlett Foundation.

== See also ==
- List of governors of Tennessee

Party political offices
Preceded by James D. Porter	Democratic nominee for Governor of Tennessee; 1878	Vacant Title next held by William B. Bate
Political offices
Preceded by James D. Porter	Governor of Tennessee; 1879-1881	Succeeded by Alvin Hawkins
