= 1880 United States presidential election in Tennessee =

- November 2, 1880
- Turnout: 15.77% of the total population ▼1.93 pp
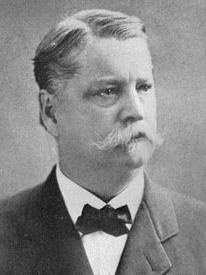

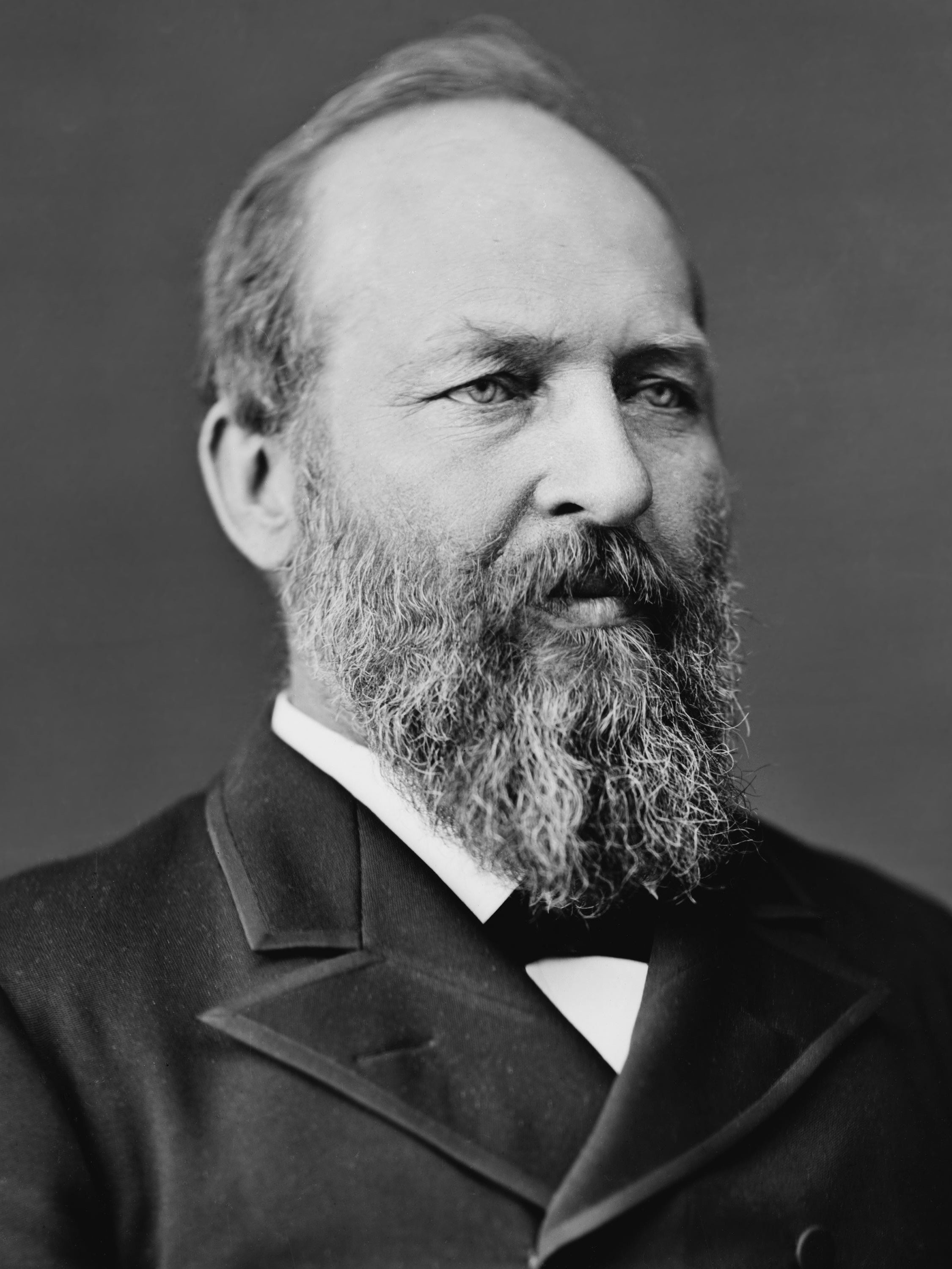
| Nominee | Winfield Scott Hancock | James A. Garfield |
| Party | Democratic | Republican |
| Home state | Pennsylvania | Ohio |
| Running mate | William Hayden English | Chester A. Arthur |
| Electoral vote | 12 | 0 |
| Popular vote | 129,569 | 107,677 |
| Percentage | 53.26% | 44.26% |
County results
Hancock
40–50%
50–60%
60–70%
70–80%
80–90%
Garfield
50–60%
60–70%
70–80%
80–90%
Unknown/No Vote
President before election
Rutherford B. Hayes
Republican
Elected President
James Garfield
Republican

The 1880 United States presidential election in Tennessee took place on November 2, 1880, as part of the 1880 United States presidential election. Voters chose 12 representatives, or electors, to the Electoral College, who voted for president and vice president.

For over a century after the Civil War, Tennessee's white citizenry was divided according to partisan loyalties established in that war. Unionist regions covering almost all of East Tennessee, Kentucky Pennyroyal-allied Macon County, and the five West Tennessee Highland Rim counties of Carroll, Henderson, McNairy, Hardin and Wayne voted Republican – generally by landslide margins – as they saw the Democratic Party as the “war party” who had forced them into a war they did not wish to fight. Contrariwise, the rest of Middle and West Tennessee who had supported and driven the state's secession was equally fiercely Democratic as it associated the Republicans with Reconstruction.

In 1868, Ulysses S. Grant easily carried the state due to disfranchisement of former Confederates and the Ku Klux Klan Act. However, in the year after that election, Tennessee was the first state where Reconstruction was ended, and with the aid of the resurgent Klan, white Democrats rewrote the state's constitution to regain some of their lost power. Nevertheless, blacks and Unionist whites forged adequate support for the GOP to create a competitive political system during that decade, although the Democratic Party won all statewide elections. However, at the beginning of the 1880s, a divide in the Democratic Party on this issue of payment of state debt allowed the GOP to claim the governor's mansion, but this did not seriously alter presidential voting and Tennessee was won by General Winfield Scott Hancock (D–Pennsylvania), running with former Representative William Hayden English, with 53.26 percent of the popular vote, against Representative James A. Garfield (R-Ohio), running with the 10th chairman of the New York State Republican Executive Committee Chester A. Arthur, with 44.26 percent of the vote.

This would be the last time a Democratic presidential candidate carried Unionist Pennyroyal Macon County until Bill Clinton in 1992.

== Results ==
1880 United States presidential election in Tennessee
| Party | Candidate | Running mate | Popular vote | | Electoral vote | |
| Party | Candidate | Running mate | Count | % | Count | % |
|---|---|---|---|---|---|---|
| Democratic | Winfield Scott Hancock of Pennsylvania | William Hayden English of Indiana | 129,569 | 53.26% | 12 | 100.00% |
| Republican | James A. Garfield of Ohio | Chester A. Arthur of New York | 107,677 | 44.26% | 0 | 0.00% |
| Greenback | James B. Weaver of Iowa | Barzillai J. Chambers of Texas | 6,017 | 2.47% | 0 | 0.00% |
| Total | | | 243,263 | 100.00% | 12 | 100.00% |

=== Results by county ===
1880 United States presidential election in Tennessee by county
| County | Winfield Scott Hancock Democratic | | James A. Garfield Republican | | James B. Weaver Greenback | | Margin | | Total votes cast |
| County | # | % | # | % | # | % | # | % | Total votes cast |
|---|---|---|---|---|---|---|---|---|---|
| Anderson | 574 | 35.17% | 1,058 | 64.83% | 0 | 0.00% | -484 | -29.66% | 1,632 |
| Bedford | 2,504 | 56.82% | 1,766 | 40.07% | 137 | 3.11% | 738 | 16.75% | 4,407 |
| Benton | 771 | 56.98% | 383 | 28.31% | 199 | 14.71% | 388 | 28.68% | 1,353 |
| Bledsoe | 372 | 42.91% | 484 | 55.82% | 11 | 1.27% | -112 | -12.92% | 867 |
| Blount | 882 | 35.58% | 1,597 | 64.42% | 0 | 0.00% | -715 | -28.84% | 2,479 |
| Bradley | 665 | 38.26% | 932 | 53.62% | 141 | 8.11% | -267 | -15.36% | 1,738 |
| Campbell | 314 | 23.22% | 1,038 | 76.78% | 0 | 0.00% | -724 | -53.55% | 1,352 |
| Cannon | 1,035 | 67.74% | 300 | 19.63% | 193 | 12.63% | 735 | 48.10% | 1,528 |
| Carroll | 1,820 | 44.91% | 2,208 | 54.48% | 25 | 0.62% | -388 | -9.57% | 4,053 |
| Carter | 405 | 19.77% | 1,644 | 80.23% | 0 | 0.00% | -1,239 | -60.47% | 2,049 |
| Cheatham | 794 | 67.81% | 291 | 24.85% | 86 | 7.34% | 503 | 42.95% | 1,171 |
| Claiborne | 967 | 44.38% | 1,212 | 55.62% | 0 | 0.00% | -245 | -11.24% | 2,179 |
| Clay | 567 | 63.57% | 177 | 19.84% | 148 | 16.59% | 390 | 43.72% | 892 |
| Cocke | 906 | 36.04% | 1,608 | 63.96% | 0 | 0.00% | -702 | -27.92% | 2,514 |
| Coffee | 1,766 | 84.94% | 198 | 9.52% | 115 | 5.53% | 1,568 | 75.42% | 2,079 |
| Cumberland | 287 | 42.33% | 371 | 54.72% | 20 | 2.95% | -84 | -12.39% | 678 |
| Davidson | 7,543 | 52.24% | 6,449 | 44.66% | 448 | 3.10% | 1,094 | 7.58% | 14,440 |
| DeKalb | 1,325 | 60.45% | 867 | 39.55% | 0 | 0.00% | 458 | 20.89% | 2,192 |
| Decatur | 753 | 59.90% | 413 | 32.86% | 91 | 7.24% | 340 | 27.05% | 1,257 |
| Dickson | 1,169 | 62.58% | 497 | 26.61% | 202 | 10.81% | 672 | 35.97% | 1,868 |
| Dyer | 1,060 | 67.39% | 248 | 15.77% | 265 | 16.85% | 795 (Note: In this county where Weaver ran second ahead of Garfield, margin given is Hancock vote minus Weaver vote and percentage margin Hancock percentage minus Weaver percentage.) | 50.54% | 1,573 |
| Fayette | 2,247 | 42.17% | 3,082 | 57.83% | 0 | 0.00% | -835 | -15.67% | 5,329 |
| Fentress | 314 | 38.06% | 511 | 61.94% | 0 | 0.00% | -197 | -23.88% | 825 |
| Franklin | 2,187 | 85.43% | 357 | 13.95% | 16 | 0.63% | 1,830 | 71.48% | 2,560 |
| Gibson | 2,691 | 61.28% | 1,700 | 38.72% | 0 | 0.00% | 991 | 22.57% | 4,391 |
| Giles | 2,899 | 57.80% | 2,040 | 40.67% | 77 | 1.54% | 859 | 17.13% | 5,016 |
| Grainger | 870 | 41.39% | 1,197 | 56.95% | 35 | 1.67% | -327 | -15.56% | 2,102 |
| Greene | 2,060 | 45.74% | 2,303 | 51.13% | 141 | 3.13% | -243 | -5.40% | 4,504 |
| Grundy | 461 | 87.98% | 63 | 12.02% | 0 | 0.00% | 398 | 75.95% | 524 |
| Hamblen | 848 | 43.38% | 1,095 | 56.01% | 12 | 0.61% | -247 | -12.63% | 1,955 |
| Hamilton | 1,595 | 38.23% | 2,460 | 58.96% | 117 | 2.80% | -865 | -20.73% | 4,172 |
| Hancock | 493 | 34.21% | 948 | 65.79% | 0 | 0.00% | -455 | -31.58% | 1,441 |
| Hardeman | 1,566 | 49.56% | 1,409 | 44.59% | 185 | 5.85% | 157 | 4.97% | 3,160 |
| Hardin | 972 | 41.84% | 1,345 | 57.90% | 6 | 0.26% | -373 | -16.06% | 2,323 |
| Hawkins | 1,039 | 28.97% | 1,907 | 53.18% | 640 | 17.85% | -868 | -24.21% | 3,586 |
| Haywood | 1,766 | 32.38% | 3,557 | 65.22% | 131 | 2.40% | -1,791 | -32.84% | 5,454 |
| Henderson | 1,274 | 46.23% | 1,385 | 50.25% | 97 | 3.52% | -111 | -4.03% | 2,756 |
| Henry | 2,305 | 66.18% | 1,013 | 29.08% | 165 | 4.74% | 1,292 | 37.09% | 3,483 |
| Hickman | 1,157 | 71.82% | 392 | 24.33% | 62 | 3.85% | 765 | 47.49% | 1,611 |
| Houston | 522 | 80.43% | 127 | 19.57% | 0 | 0.00% | 395 | 60.86% | 649 |
| Humphreys | 1,325 | 80.69% | 245 | 14.92% | 72 | 4.38% | 1,080 | 65.77% | 1,642 |
| Jackson | 1,299 | 88.85% | 136 | 9.30% | 27 | 1.85% | 1,163 | 79.55% | 1,462 |
| James | 209 | 32.86% | 403 | 63.36% | 24 | 3.77% | -194 | -30.50% | 636 |
| Jefferson | 693 | 27.33% | 1,807 | 71.25% | 36 | 1.42% | -1,114 | -43.93% | 2,536 |
| Johnson | 203 | 15.68% | 1,092 | 84.32% | 0 | 0.00% | -889 | -68.65% | 1,295 |
| Knox | 3,119 | 41.61% | 4,361 | 58.18% | 16 | 0.21% | -1,242 | -16.57% | 7,496 |
| Lake | 337 | 84.46% | 28 | 7.02% | 34 | 8.52% | 303 | 75.94% | 399 |
| Lauderdale | 1,147 | 52.02% | 971 | 44.04% | 87 | 3.95% | 176 | 7.98% | 2,205 |
| Lawrence | 928 | 71.94% | 362 | 28.06% | 0 | 0.00% | 566 | 43.88% | 1,290 |
| Lewis | 200 | 84.03% | 37 | 15.55% | 1 | 0.42% | 163 | 68.49% | 238 |
| Lincoln | 3,652 | 78.84% | 886 | 19.13% | 94 | 2.03% | 2,766 | 59.72% | 4,632 |
| Loudon | 533 | 34.30% | 1,021 | 65.70% | 0 | 0.00% | -488 | -31.40% | 1,554 |
| Macon | 713 | 54.59% | 559 | 42.80% | 34 | 2.60% | 154 | 11.79% | 1,306 |
| Madison | 2,834 | 54.36% | 2,223 | 42.64% | 156 | 2.99% | 611 | 11.72% | 5,213 |
| Marion | 740 | 45.51% | 886 | 54.49% | 0 | 0.00% | -146 | -8.98% | 1,626 |
| Marshall | 2,006 | 76.04% | 548 | 20.77% | 84 | 3.18% | 1,458 | 55.27% | 2,638 |
| Maury | 3,306 | 54.66% | 2,742 | 45.34% | 0 | 0.00% | 564 | 9.33% | 6,048 |
| McMinn | 1,209 | 45.25% | 1,463 | 54.75% | 0 | 0.00% | -254 | -9.51% | 2,672 |
| McNairy | 1,135 | 46.65% | 949 | 39.01% | 349 | 14.34% | 186 | 7.64% | 2,433 |
| Meigs | 607 | 60.58% | 395 | 39.42% | 0 | 0.00% | 212 | 21.16% | 1,002 |
| Monroe | 1,181 | 56.18% | 919 | 43.72% | 2 | 0.10% | 262 | 12.46% | 2,102 |
| Montgomery | 2,846 | 58.26% | 2,039 | 41.74% | 0 | 0.00% | 807 | 16.52% | 4,885 |
| Morgan | 245 | 36.08% | 434 | 63.92% | 0 | 0.00% | -189 | -27.84% | 679 |
| Obion | 1,982 | 71.22% | 583 | 20.95% | 218 | 7.83% | 1,399 | 50.27% | 2,783 |
| Overton | 1,152 | 72.59% | 430 | 27.10% | 5 | 0.32% | 722 | 45.49% | 1,587 |
| Perry | 604 | 73.04% | 223 | 26.96% | 0 | 0.00% | 381 | 46.07% | 827 |
| Polk | 653 | 64.02% | 362 | 35.49% | 5 | 0.49% | 291 | 28.53% | 1,020 |
| Putnam | 1,040 | 68.92% | 467 | 30.95% | 2 | 0.13% | 573 | 37.97% | 1,509 |
| Rhea | 668 | 61.00% | 427 | 39.00% | 0 | 0.00% | 241 | 22.01% | 1,095 |
| Roane | 805 | 33.02% | 1,628 | 66.78% | 5 | 0.21% | -823 | -33.76% | 2,438 |
| Robertson | 2,107 | 67.55% | 951 | 30.49% | 61 | 1.96% | 1,156 | 37.06% | 3,119 |
| Rutherford | 3,855 | 60.10% | 2,482 | 38.70% | 77 | 1.20% | 1,373 | 21.41% | 6,414 |
| Scott | 127 | 17.91% | 582 | 82.09% | 0 | 0.00% | -455 | -64.17% | 709 |
| Sequatchie | 224 | 64.93% | 119 | 34.49% | 2 | 0.58% | 105 | 30.43% | 345 |
| Sevier | 431 | 17.36% | 2,052 | 82.64% | 0 | 0.00% | -1,621 | -65.28% | 2,483 |
| Shelby | 6,927 | 46.24% | 7,788 | 51.99% | 264 | 1.76% | -861 | -5.75% | 14,979 |
| Smith | 1,569 | 62.16% | 705 | 27.93% | 250 | 9.90% | 864 | 34.23% | 2,524 |
| Stewart | 1,322 | 71.58% | 488 | 26.42% | 37 | 2.00% | 834 | 45.15% | 1,847 |
| Sullivan | 2,264 | 65.23% | 1,207 | 34.77% | 0 | 0.00% | 1,057 | 30.45% | 3,471 |
| Sumner | 2,893 | 72.60% | 1,092 | 27.40% | 0 | 0.00% | 1,801 | 45.19% | 3,985 |
| Tipton | 1,893 | 53.78% | 1,604 | 45.57% | 23 | 0.65% | 289 | 8.21% | 3,520 |
| Trousdale | 793 | 76.25% | 247 | 23.75% | 0 | 0.00% | 546 | 52.50% | 1,040 |
| Union | 480 | 29.63% | 1,140 | 70.37% | 0 | 0.00% | -660 | -40.74% | 1,620 |
| Van Buren | 281 | 82.40% | 60 | 17.60% | 0 | 0.00% | 221 | 64.81% | 341 |
| Warren | 1,577 | 73.52% | 482 | 22.47% | 86 | 4.01% | 1,095 | 51.05% | 2,145 |
| Washington | 1,576 | 42.83% | 2,104 | 57.17% | 0 | 0.00% | -528 | -14.35% | 3,680 |
| Wayne | 649 | 41.76% | 905 | 58.24% | 0 | 0.00% | -256 | -16.47% | 1,554 |
| Weakley | 2,526 | 63.21% | 1,470 | 36.79% | 0 | 0.00% | 1,056 | 26.43% | 3,996 |
| White | 1,308 | 84.01% | 173 | 11.11% | 76 | 4.88% | 1,135 | 72.90% | 1,557 |
| Williamson | 2,733 | 63.94% | 1,541 | 36.06% | 0 | 0.00% | 1,192 | 27.89% | 4,274 |
| Wilson | 2,918 | 68.34% | 1,227 | 28.74% | 125 | 2.93% | 1,691 | 39.60% | 4,270 |
| Totals | 129,569 | 53.26% | 107,677 | 44.26% | 6,017 | 2.47% | 21,892 | 9.00% | 243,263 |

== See also ==
- United States presidential elections in Tennessee
- 1880 Tennessee gubernatorial election
