= Partial payment =

Partial payment refers to the offering of a payment by check for less than the full amount claimed by the creditor.

Such an offer for debt discharge by tender of a "payment-in-full" check is common practice. If the amount tendered is not grossly insufficient, the creditor must decide whether to accept the payment and forfeit the balance, or refuse and try to collect the full amount. Court rulings have treated the tender of such a check as the offer of an accord and satisfaction. If the creditor accepts, endorses, and receives payment from the check, he has accepted the contract, and so discharged the whole debt owed by the debtor.
