= James D. Porter =

American politician (1828–1912)

James Davis Porter
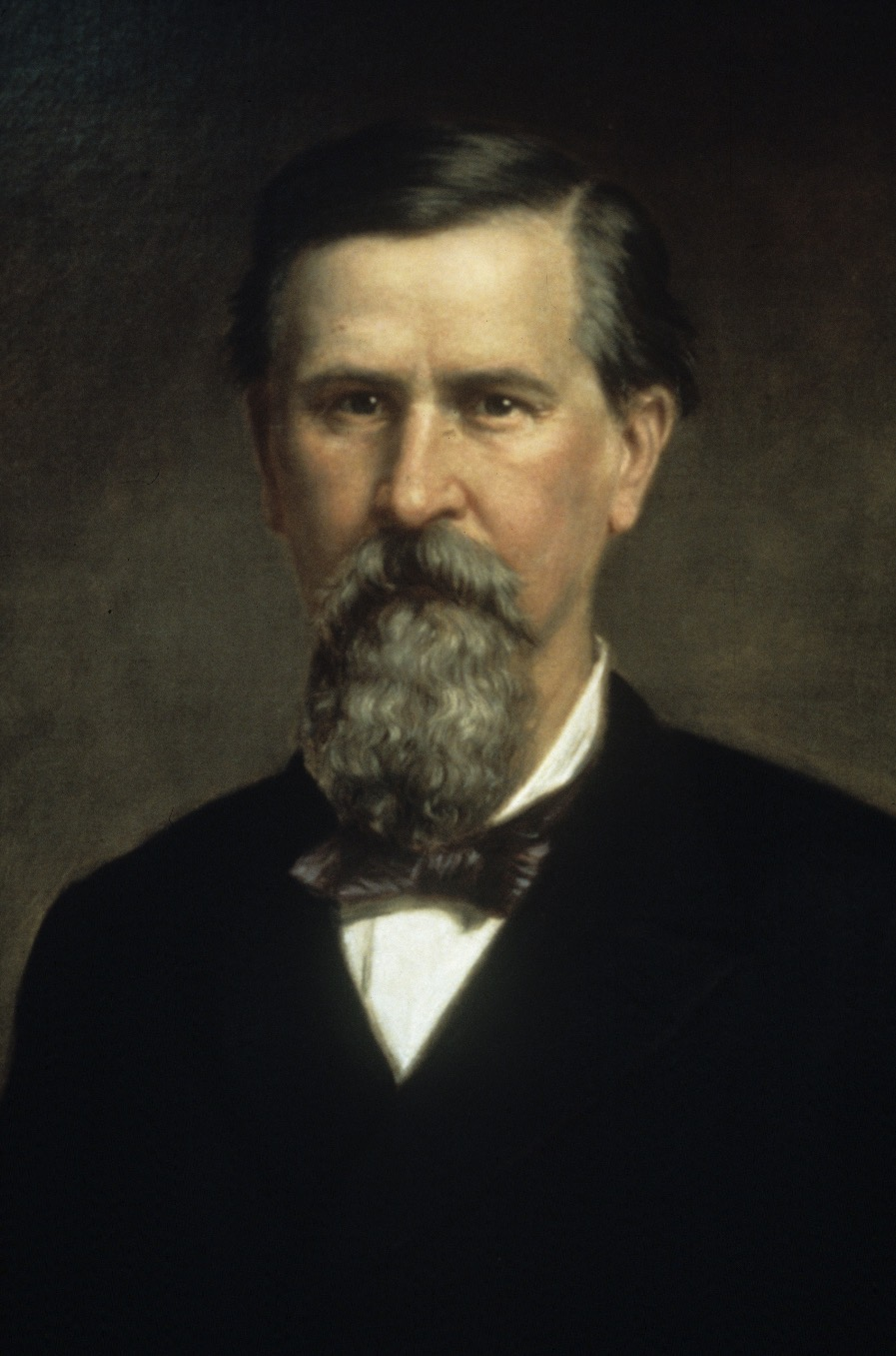
- Portrait by George Dury, c. 1877

20th Governor of Tennessee
- In office January 18, 1875 – February 16, 1879
- Preceded by: John C. Brown
- Succeeded by: Albert S. Marks

United States Assistant Secretary of State
- In office March 20, 1885 – September 17, 1887
- President: Grover Cleveland
- Preceded by: John Davis
- Succeeded by: George L. Rives

United States Minister to Chile
- In office July 4, 1893 – March 14, 1894
- President: Grover Cleveland
- Preceded by: Patrick Egan
- Succeeded by: Edward H. Strobel

Member of the Tennessee House of Representatives
- In office 1859–1861

Personal details
- Born: December 7, 1828 Paris, Tennessee, U.S.
- Died: May 18, 1912 (aged 83) Paris, Tennessee, U.S.
- Resting place: Paris City Cemetery
- Party: Whig; Democratic
- Spouse: Susannah Dunlap (m. 1851)
- Profession: Attorney, educator

Military service
- Allegiance: Confederate States of America
- Branch/service: Confederate States Army
- Years of service: 1861–1865
- Rank: Lieutenant colonel
- Battles/wars: American Civil War • Belmont (1861) • Shiloh (1862) • Chickamauga (1863) • Missionary Ridge (1863) • Atlanta campaign (1864) • Nashville (1864)

James Davis Porter (December 7, 1828 – May 18, 1912) was an American attorney, politician, educator, and officer of the Confederate Army. He served as the 20th governor of Tennessee from 1875 to 1879. He was subsequently appointed as Assistant Secretary of State during President Grover Cleveland's first administration, and Minister to Chile in Cleveland's second administration.

As an elected state legislator on the eve of the Civil War, Porter had introduced the "Porter resolutions," which bound Tennessee to the Confederacy should war be declared. He served during much of the war as chief of staff to Confederate General Benjamin F. Cheatham, and saw action at various battles in Tennessee and Georgia.

Porter spent his later years as chancellor of his alma mater, the University of Nashville, and as president of Peabody College. This was established at the University of Nashville during his gubernatorial administration. He oversaw the liquidation and transfer of the University of Nashville's assets to the Peabody Education Fund, which allowed Peabody College to be re-established near Vanderbilt University in 1909.

== Early life ==
Porter was born in Paris, Tennessee, the son of Dr. Thomas Kennedy Porter and Geraldine (Horton) Porter. Their town was the county seat of Henry County, included within West Tennessee. Porter attended college at the University of Nashville, where he obtained a Bachelor of Arts in 1846, and a Master of Arts in 1849. He studied law at Cumberland University and in Paris under local attorney John H. Dunlap; he was admitted to the bar in 1851. That year he also married Susannah Dunlap, his mentor's daughter, starting his career and adult life.

== Career and Civil War ==
Porter began a private practice in Paris, where he also became involved in politics. He was elected as a Whig to the Tennessee House of Representatives in 1859. In 1861, he introduced the "Porter resolutions," which were eventually adopted. These resolutions stipulated that, in the event of war between seceding states and the Union, Tennessee would align with the seceding states. In early May 1861, following the Battle of Fort Sumter, these measures were enacted, and Tennessee signed a military pact with the Confederacy.

Porter was commissioned as an adjutant general under Gideon J. Pillow, and helped organize the Provisional Army of Tennessee. After this army was attached to the greater Confederate Army, Porter was assigned to General Benjamin F. Cheatham. As Cheatham's chief of staff, Porter took part in the battles of Belmont, Shiloh, Chickamauga, Missionary Ridge, and the Siege of Atlanta.

After the war, Porter returned to his law practice in Paris. In 1870, he was a delegate to the state's constitutional convention, which wrote the current Tennessee State Constitution, and served on the convention's judiciary committee. Following the convention, he was elected judge of the state's 12th circuit. Originally a Whig, he joined the Democratic Party after the Civil War, which was the party of the majority of southern whites.

== Governor ==
Porter received the Democratic nomination for governor in 1874. He easily defeated his Republican opponent, Horace Maynard, by a 105,061 to 55,847 vote later that year. In 1876, he was reelected by a similarly lopsided margin over several candidates, among them moderate Democrat Dorsey B. Thomas and Republican William F. Yardley, the latter being the state's first African-American candidate for governor.

Like his predecessor, John C. Brown, Porter spent much of his gubernatorial tenure managing the state's out-of-control debt. After the state defaulted on its bonded debt in 1875, Porter continued to argue that the state should pay off the bonds in full to protect its credit. The Panic of 1873 had greatly reduced tax revenues, however, and full repayment proved unfeasible. His successors sought only a partial repayment.

Porter was a strong supporter of public education. When the Peabody Fund announced it was going to establish a school for teachers in Nashville, Porter used his influence to have the school attached to the University of Nashville.

During his tenure, but independent of the state, the South's first medical school for African Americans, the privately supported Meharry Medical College, was founded in Nashville as part of Central Tennessee College, a historically black college founded by the northern Methodist Church.

Porter signed the so-called "Four Mile Law," an early, backdoor form of Prohibition that forbade alcoholic beverages within four miles (6.4 km) of any school. Given the small size of most of the schools of the era, they were built in nearly every community, even many of the smallest ones. The law effectively outlawed alcohol in all but the least-populated areas of the state.

== Later endeavors ==
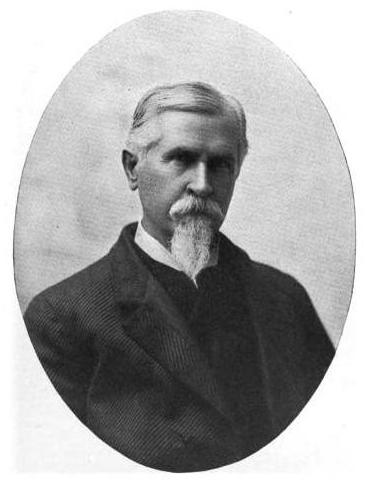
Porter, photographed later in life

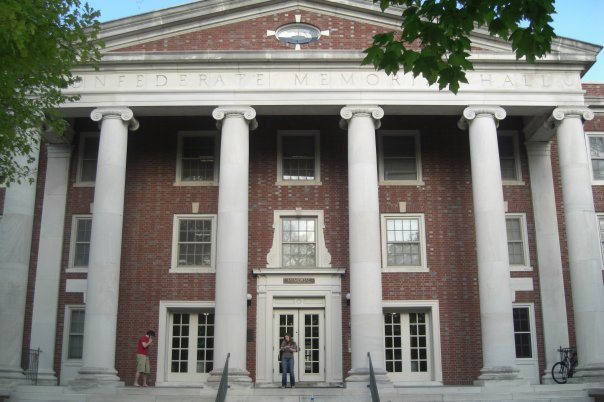
Confederate Memorial Hall on the Vanderbilt University campus.

In his book Appalachian Aspirations, Professor John Benhart describes Porter (and ex-Governor John C. Brown) as "typical of the New South Conservatives who dominated Tennessee politics during the two decades following Reconstruction, mixing the mores of the Old South with a recognition that industrial capitalism was the wave of the future." Following his tenure as governor, Porter remained active in the New South economy.

He succeeded Edmund William Cole as the president of the Nashville, Chattanooga and St. Louis Railway from 1880 to 1884. He also served on the board of directors of the Tennessee Coal, Iron and Railroad Company.

In 1885, Porter was appointed Assistant Secretary of State by President Grover Cleveland. He served under Secretary of State Thomas F. Bayard. In 1893, during Cleveland's second term, Porter was appointed as U.S. Minister to Chile. He served there until a change in administrations in the Spring of 1894.

Porter spent the latter part of his life promoting and raising funds for his alma mater, the University of Nashville (from which he had been granted an honorary LL.D. in 1877), and its affiliated Peabody College. He was appointed a trustee of the Peabody Education Fund in 1883, and became president of the Board of Trustees for the University of Nashville in 1890.

Porter became chancellor of the University of Nashville in 1901, and president of Peabody College in 1902. He supported the construction of Confederate Memorial Hall. In the latter part of the decade, he oversaw the liquidation of the University of Nashville's assets and their transfer to the Peabody fund for the reestablishment of Peabody College. The fund chose to locate the reorganized college at Vanderbilt's campus, however, leaving Porter embittered. He resigned from the fund's board in 1909.

In 1899, Porter published a book, The Military History of Tennessee, War of 1861-65, which became Volume VIII of Clement Evans's 12-volume series, Confederate Military History. He was also active in the Tennessee Historical Society, at one point serving as its president.

Porter died in 1912, and is buried in the Paris City Cemetery.

== Family ==
In 1851 Porter married Susannah Dunlap in Paris, Tennessee. She was the daughter of his law mentor, John H. Dunlap. They had six children together, three of whom died at a young age.

Party political offices
Vacant Title last held by John C. Brown	Democratic nominee for Governor of Tennessee; 1874, 1876	Succeeded by Albert S. Marks
Political offices
Preceded by John C. Brown	Governor of Tennessee; 1875–1879	Succeeded by Albert S. Marks
Diplomatic posts
Preceded by Patrick Egan	United States Minister to Chile; 4 July 1893 – 14 March 1894	Succeeded by Edward H. Strobel
