= Eli M. Wight =

American politician (1841–1881)

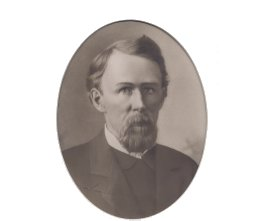

Mayor of Chattanooga
- In office 1873–1873
- Preceded by: Josiah Jackson Bryan
- Succeeded by: Philander D. Sims
- In office 1877–1877
- Preceded by: Tomlinson Fort
- Succeeded by: Thomas J. Carlisle

Personal details
- Born: May 4, 1841 West Bethel, Maine
- Died: January 6, 1881 (aged 39) Chattanooga, Tennessee

Eli Mellen Wight (May 4, 1841 – January 6, 1881) was an American politician who served as mayor of Chattanooga, Tennessee.

== Biography ==
Wight was born in Maine on May 4, 1841. He was educated as a medical doctor. In 1861, he joined the Union Army. In 1864, he was stationed at Chattanooga where he also treated civilians. In 1866, he left the military and remained in Chattanooga where he started his own medical practice. In 1873, he was elected mayor where he focused on reducing the government deficit by shrinking the police department, laying off the city engineer in the winter, closing the Public Works department for several months, and asking the citizens more quickly pay their taxes. In 1876, he was elected to a second term again focusing on fiscal responsibility. In 1878, he ran unsuccessfully as the Republican candidate for Governor of Tennessee receiving 42,284 votes compared to 89,958 votes for the winner Democrat Albert S. Marks, and 14,155 votes for the Greenback candidate, Richard M. Edwards.

After his defeat, he returned to the practice of medicine. He died on January 6, 1881.
