= Dorsey B. Thomas =

American politician (1823–1897)

Dorsey Brown Thomas (October 18, 1823 – June 5, 1897) was a lawyer, businessman and politician who served as Speaker of the Tennessee Senate from 1869 to 1871. This position had been the designated successor to the Governor of Tennessee so akin to Lieutenant Governor of Tennessee.

== Biography ==
Thomas was born on October 18, 1823, near Franklin in Williamson County, Tennessee, the son of William Thomas and his wife Eliza Bass. He attended the local schools, read law and was admitted to the bar.

From 1845 to 1861, Thomas practiced law in Haywood County, Tennessee and operated a tanning business. From 1855 to 1857, he served as a Know-Nothing Party member of the Tennessee House of Representatives. In 1861, Thomas moved to Humphreys County, Tennessee and relocated his tanning business to Box Station.

From April to October 1865, Thomas served as a Unionist member of the Tennessee House of Representatives. After the end of the American Civil War, he was defeated for a seat in the United States House of Representatives by Samuel M. Arnell. From 1868 to 1870, Thomas was a member of the Democratic State Executive Committee. From 1869 to 1871, he served in the Tennessee Senate and was elected speaker.

In 1876, Thomas was an unsuccessful candidate for Governor of Tennessee. From 1883 to 1885, he again served in the Tennessee House of Representatives. From 1885 to 1887 and from 1891 to 1893, Thomas served additional terms in the Tennessee Senate. In 1892, he was a presidential elector for Grover Cleveland.

In later life, Thomas lived on a farm in Humphreys County. He died there on June 5, 1897, and was interred at Wyly Cemetery in Waverly, Tennessee.

== Family ==
Thomas married Lucy Jane Robinson on February 23, 1863. They had five sons and a daughter.

His younger brother Atha Thomas and eldest sons Battle Robinson Thomas and Dorsey Brown Thomas Jr. all served in the Tennessee General Assembly. His brother Atha Thomas also served as Tennessee State Treasurer.
