= William Carroll (Tennessee politician) =

American politician (1788–1844)

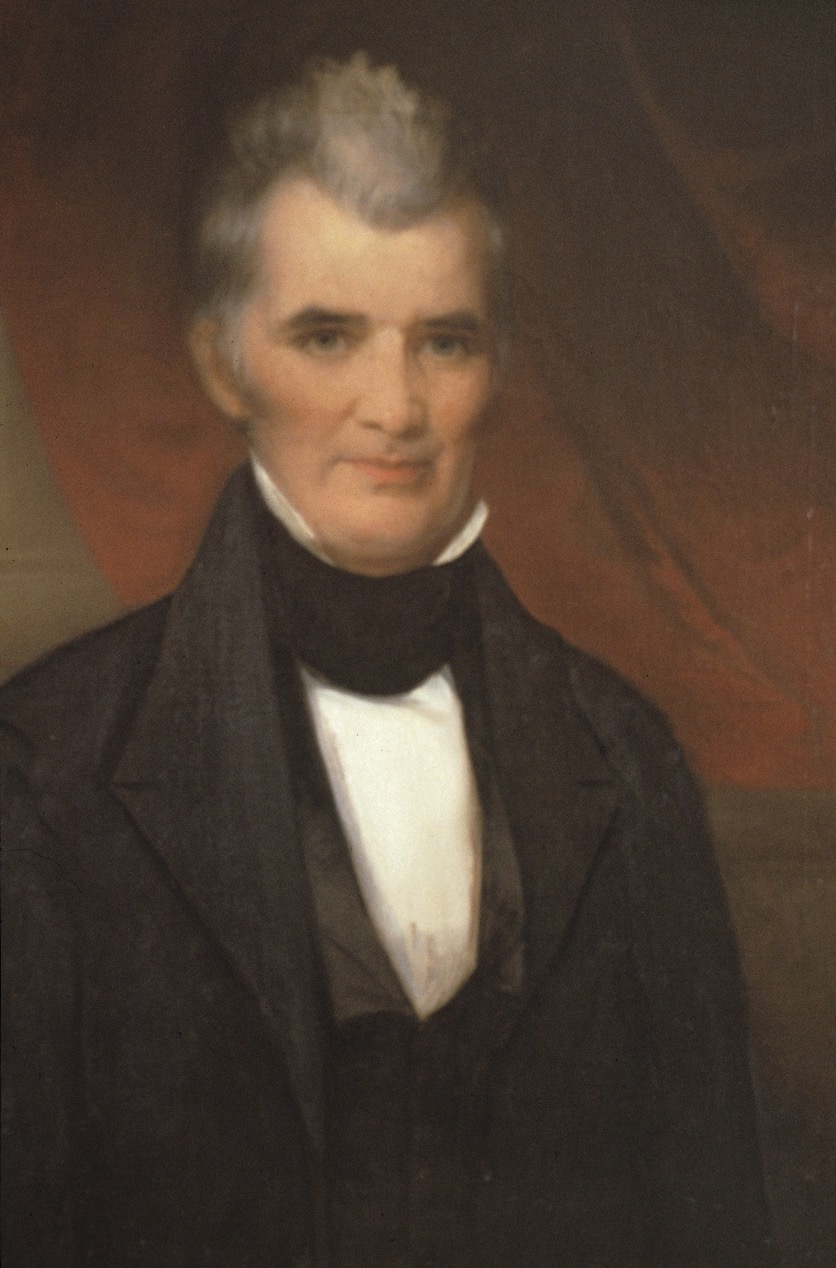
- Portrait by Washington Bogart Cooper, c. 1843

5th Governor of Tennessee
- In office October 1, 1821 – October 1, 1827
- Preceded by: Joseph McMinn
- Succeeded by: Sam Houston
- In office October 1, 1829 – October 12, 1835
- Preceded by: William Hall
- Succeeded by: Newton Cannon

Personal details
- Born: March 3, 1788 Pittsburgh, Pennsylvania, U.S.
- Died: March 22, 1844 (aged 56) Nashville, Tennessee, U.S.
- Resting place: Nashville City Cemetery
- Party: Democratic-Republican, later Democratic
- Spouse: Cecelia Bradford
- Relations: William Henry Carroll (son)
- Profession: Businessman

Military service
- Branch/service: Tennessee militia
- Years of service: 1812–1815
- Rank: Major General
- Battles/wars: Creek War • Talladega (1813) • Emuckfaw (1814) • Enotachopo (1814) • Horseshoe Bend (1814); War of 1812 • New Orleans (1815)

William Carroll (March 3, 1788 – March 22, 1844) was an American politician who served as the fifth governor of Tennessee twice, from 1821 to 1827 and again from 1829 to 1835. He held the office longer than any other person with 12 years of service, including the state's only other six-term governor, John Sevier. He is considered one of the state's most popular political figures of the 1820s, and is credited with initiating numerous legal and tax reforms.

Carroll joined the Tennessee militia as a captain in 1812, and quickly rose through the ranks. He participated in several engagements during the Creek War, and, as a major-general, commanded Andrew Jackson's center at the Battle of New Orleans in 1815.

== Early life ==
Like two of his predecessors, Archibald Roane and Joseph McMinn, Carroll was a native of Pennsylvania, having been born near Pittsburgh.

His father, Thomas Carroll, was a business associate of Albert Gallatin, and had established a successful chain of hardware stores in the Pittsburgh area. William Carroll had little formal education as a child, but acquired practical learning from working in his father's business.

He moved to Nashville in 1808 and established a branch store in the city. He presented himself to Andrew Jackson with a letter of introduction from Gallatin.

== War of 1812 and Creek War ==
At the outbreak of the War of 1812, Carroll was appointed captain of the Nashville Uniform Volunteers, and joined Andrew Jackson's Creek campaign. Within a few months, he had been promoted to major, and took part in the Battle of Talladega in November 1813. For his actions in this battle, he was promoted to colonel. He fought at the Battles of Emuckfaw and Enotachopo Creek in January 1814, and was wounded at the Battle of Horseshoe Bend in March 1814.

In 1813, Carroll became involved in a quarrel with another Jackson subordinate, Jesse Benton, that culminated in a duel on June 14 of that year. Jackson initially tried to defuse the quarrel, but, unsuccessful, he agreed to be Carroll's second. In the duel, Carroll lost part of his thumb, and Benton was shot through the hip, but both survived. Benton's older brother, Thomas Hart Benton, was enraged after hearing Jackson had supported Carroll, and the Benton brothers would later brawl with Jackson in Nashville over the incident.

After the Battle of Horseshoe Bend, Carroll returned to Nashville to recruit troops for the defense of New Orleans. After Jackson resigned from the militia to accept a commission in the federal army, Carroll was elected major-general of the Tennessee militia. Traveling via the Cumberland, Ohio and Mississippi rivers, his new troops arrived in New Orleans just prior to the British invasion. At the Battle of New Orleans on January 8, 1815, Carroll's troops fought near the center of Jackson's line, where some of the most intense fighting occurred.

== Politics ==
Following the war, Carroll resumed his business career in Nashville. In 1818, he became part owner of the New Orleans steamboat, the General Jackson. On March 11, 1819, after a treacherous journey up the Mississippi, Ohio and Cumberland rivers, the General Jackson became the first steamboat to reach Nashville. During the Panic of 1819, Carroll's business failed, and he was forced into bankruptcy.

In 1821, Carroll, still immensely popular from his War of 1812 endeavors, ran for governor. Although his opponent, Edward Ward, was backed by the state's political elite, including Andrew Jackson, Hugh Lawson White and Joseph McMinn, Carroll gained the support of Jackson foes John Williams and Davy Crockett, and was able to harness the anti-establishment sentiment that had arisen in the wake of the financial crisis. He easily defeated Ward on election day, 32,290 votes to 7,294. He immediately set out to reform the state's tax laws, but his call for a constitutional convention was defeated by the legislature.

As Tennessee's economy improved, Carroll's popularity soared. He ran unopposed for reelection in 1823 and 1825.

In 1827, at the end of his third two-year term, constitutional term limits prevented him from serving a fourth consecutive term. He was succeeded by Sam Houston.

After he was passed over for a U. S. Senate seat, he became wary of the Jacksonites, and ran against Houston in 1829. Houston resigned following a scandal shortly after Carroll announced his campaign, however, and William Hall, as Speaker of the Senate, succeeded him. Hall refused to run for reelection, and Carroll was easily elected.

Carroll successfully sought the office again in 1831 and 1833, and was elected without opposition.

Carrol's governorship was noted for the establishment of a more progressive (for the era) Penal Code, which replaced corporal punishment with a state prison system, as well as the establishment of an insane asylum and the establishment of a Chancery Court.

He also persistently advocated for government-funded internal improvements, which helped the state's businesses. During his final term, the state constitution of 1796 was supplanted by a new one which gave more executive power to the governor; although this document was technically superseded by the current one in 1870, that document carries over very many of the provisions of the 1834 constitution, upon which it was largely based.

Popular provisions in the new constitution included an equitable land tax (which benefited small farmers) and the requirement that county officials be popularly elected, rather than appointed.

Carroll claimed that the new constitution allowed him to seek a fourth consecutive term. He was doomed by rising Whig sentiment in the state, however, and lost the gubernatorial electionlost the gubernatorial election to Newton Cannon by a vote of 41,970 to 31,205. He persistently campaigned for one of the state's U. S. Senate seats in subsequent years, but was never successful.

Carroll served as governor of Tennessee longer than anyone else has to this point, even fellow six-term governor Sevier. Sevier's first term was unusually short due to the time of year of the admission of Tennessee into the Union. Carroll's gubernatorial service totaled twelve years and twelve days.

== Death ==
Carroll lived quietly after his terms as governor ended. He died on March 22, 1844, and is interred at Nashville City Cemetery in Nashville, Tennessee.

== Legacy ==
Carroll County, Tennessee, is named in his honor.

Carroll County, Arkansas, although disputed, is believed by some historians to be named in his honor. As support for this theory, historians point to the fact that a large percentage of the Carroll County, Arkansas population is reported to have emigrated from Overton County, Tennessee during his popular governorship.

Carrollton, New Orleans, Louisiana, is named in his honor.

== Family life ==
He was married to Cecilia Bradford, and they raised four children. One of their sons was Confederate Brigadier General William Henry Carroll.

== See also ==
- General Carroll's Road

Party political offices
Preceded by Sam Houston	Democratic nominee for Governor of Tennessee; 1829, 1831, 1833, 1835	Succeeded by Robert Armstrong
Political offices
Preceded by Joseph McMinn	Governor of Tennessee; 1821–1827	Succeeded by Sam Houston
Preceded by William Hall	Governor of Tennessee; 1829–1835	Succeeded by Newton Cannon
