= 1835 Tennessee gubernatorial election =

- August 6, 1835
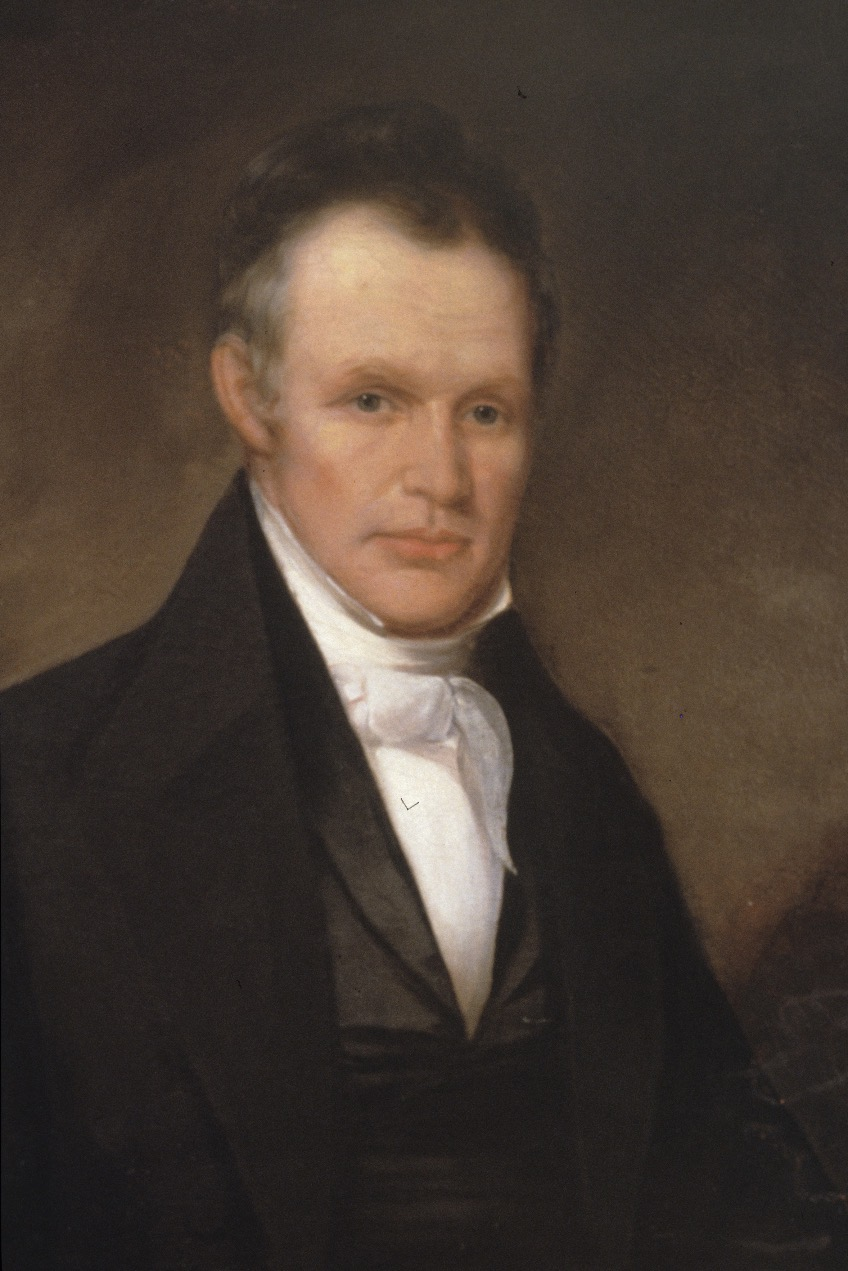

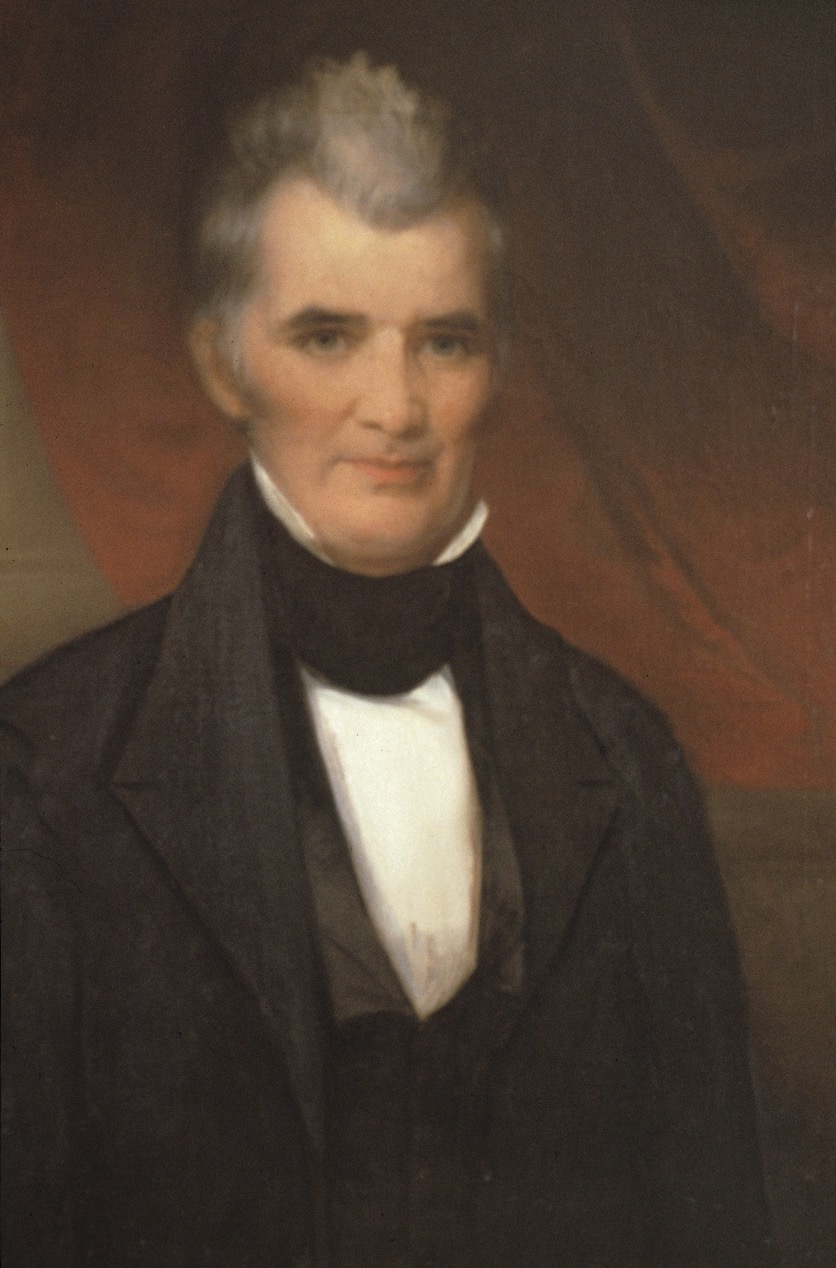

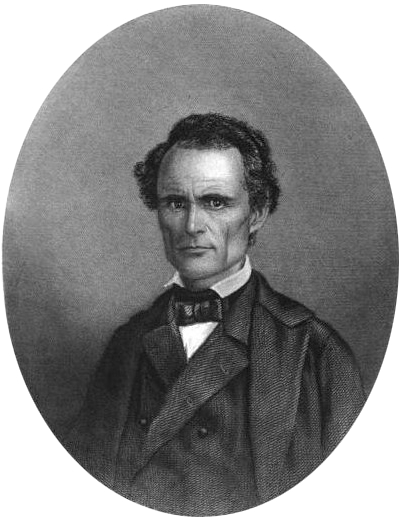
Nominee	Newton Cannon	William Carroll	West Hughes Humphreys
Party	Whig	Democratic	Independent
Popular vote	41,862	33,180	7,999
Percentage	50.41%	39.96%	9.63%
- County results Cannon: 40–50% 50–60% 60–70% 70–80% 80–90% Carroll: 30–40% 40–50% 50–60% 60–70% 70–80% 80–90% Humphreys: 40–50% No Data/Vote
Governor before election
William Carroll
Democratic
Elected Governor
Newton Cannon
Whig

The 1835 Tennessee gubernatorial election was held on August 6, 1835, to elect the Governor of Tennessee. Whig nominee, former member of the U.S. House of Representatives from Tennessee's 5th district and candidate for Governor in 1827 Newton Cannon defeated Democratic nominee and incumbent Governor William Carroll and member of the Tennessee House of Representatives West Hughes Humphreys.

Cannon became the first member of the Whig Party to be elected governor of Tennessee.

== Background ==
During William Carroll's final term, the state constitution of 1796 was supplanted by a new one which gave more executive power to the governor.

Popular provisions in the new constitution included an equitable land tax (which benefited small farmers) and the requirement that county officials be popularly elected, rather than appointed.

Carroll claimed that the new constitution allowed him to seek a fourth consecutive term and he tried to run for re-election.

== General election ==
On election day, August 6, 1835, Whig candidate Newton Cannon won the election by a margin of 8,682 votes against his foremost opponent Democratic candidate and incumbent Governor William Carroll, thereby gaining Whig control over the office of Governor. Cannon was sworn in as the 8th Governor of Tennessee on October 12, 1835.

=== Results ===
Tennessee gubernatorial election, 1835
Party	Candidate	Votes	%
Whig	Newton Cannon	41,862	50.41%
Democratic	William Carroll (incumbent)	33,180	39.96%
Independent/Other	West Hughes Humphreys	7,999	9.63%
Total votes		83,041	100.00%
Whig gain from Democratic			
