= Newton Cannon =

American politician (1781–1841)

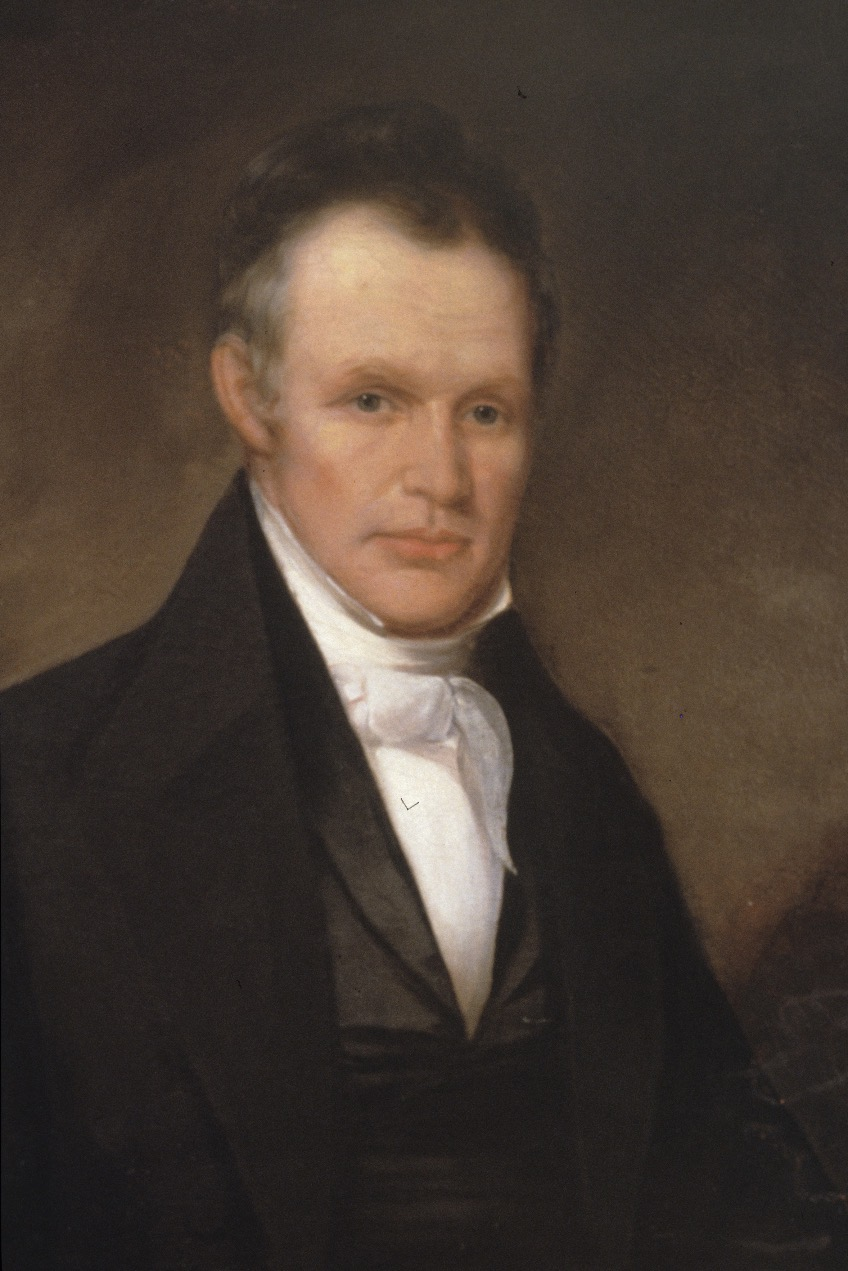
- Posthumous Portrait by Washington B. Cooper, c. 1845

8th Governor of Tennessee
- In office October 12, 1835 – October 14, 1839
- Preceded by: William Carroll
- Succeeded by: James K. Polk

Member of the U.S. House of Representatives from Tennessee's 5th district
- In office March 4, 1819 – March 3, 1823
- Preceded by: Thomas Claiborne
- Succeeded by: Robert Allen
- In office September 16, 1814 – March 3, 1817
- Preceded by: Felix Grundy
- Succeeded by: Thomas Claiborne

Member of the Tennessee Senate
- In office 1811–1812

Personal details
- Born: May 22, 1781 Guilford County, North Carolina
- Died: September 16, 1841 (aged 60) Williamson County, Tennessee
- Resting place: Newton Cannon Cemetery, Williamson County, Tennessee
- Party: Democratic-Republican; Whig
- Spouse(s): Leah Pryor Perkins (1813–1816, her death); Rachel Starnes Willborn (1818–1841, his death)
- Profession: Planter

Military service
- Branch/service: Tennessee militia
- Years of service: 1812–1813
- Rank: Colonel
- Battles/wars: Creek War

Newton Cannon (May 22, 1781 – September 16, 1841) was an American politician who served as the eighth governor of Tennessee from 1835 to 1839. He also served several terms in the United States House of Representatives, from 1814 to 1817, and from 1819 to 1823. Cannon was a long-time foe of Andrew Jackson, and spent much of his political career opposing Jacksonite policies. Cannon was succeeded as Governor of Tennessee by James K. Polk in 1839, who later became President of the United States.

== Early life ==
Born in Guilford County, North Carolina, Cannon was the son of Minos Cannon, who served as a soldier in the Continental Army. The family moved to the area that later became Williamson County, Tennessee, around 1790.

Cannon received a common school education and tried several occupations as a young man, working as a saddler, merchant and surveyor, and undertaking the study of law, before eventually becoming a planter in Williamson County. He owned slaves.

== Career ==
Cannon entered political office in 1811, representing Williamson, Rutherford, Maury, Bedford, Lincoln, and Giles counties in the state senate in the 9th Tennessee General Assembly (1811–1812). He served in the Creek War of 1813 as a colonel in the Tennessee Mounted Rifles.

In 1813, he was a candidate for United States House of Representatives, losing the election to Felix Grundy. He won election to the seat as a Democratic-Republican the following year, however, in a special election held after Grundy resigned. Cannon was later reelected to a full term in the House, serving from September 16, 1814, to March 3, 1817. In 1819, he accepted an assignment from President James Monroe to negotiate a treaty with the Chickasaw. He was again elected to the U.S. House for the 16th Congress and won re-election to the 17th Congress, serving from March 4, 1819, to March 3, 1823. He owned 26 slaves in Williamson County, Tennessee at the time of the 1820 U.S. census.

=== Governorship ===
Cannon first sought the Tennessee governorship in 1827 in a field that initially included Sam Houston, former governor Willie Blount, Felix Grundy, and aging frontiersman John Rhea. Cannon lost the election to Houston by 11,314 votes. He subsequently returned to the General Assembly as a state senator, representing Rutherford and Williamson counties in the 18th General Assembly (1829–1830), and aligned himself with Andrew Erwin, John Williams and Davy Crockett, to oppose the policies of Jackson and his allies. He was elected as a delegate to the Tennessee Constitutional Convention of 1834, at which he served as chairman of the Committee of the Whole.

Cannon again ran for governor in 1835, defeating incumbent William Carroll by 8,682 votes. Carroll had been a popular governor, but he was seeking a fourth consecutive two-year term in spite of a provision of the state constitution that limited a governor to three terms. Carroll maintained that the gubernatorial term limit in the state's original constitution no longer applied because it was replaced by a new constitution in 1834. Cannon, however, argued that the 1834 constitution was a revision rather than a replacement for the original constitution. Cannon's view apparently prevailed with the voters. Cannon's election was also aided by division among Tennessee Democrat-Republicans over the U.S. Presidential candidacy of Tennessean Hugh Lawson White in opposition to the national party's choice of Martin Van Buren.

Cannon was the first member of the Whig Party to be elected governor of Tennessee. He became the first governor to benefit from increased powers given to the office by the state constitution of 1834. As governor, in 1836 he convened the first special session of the legislature in state history.

Cannon was re-elected to a second term as governor in 1837, defeating General Robert Armstrong. In his second term as governor, both houses of the General Assembly were controlled by Whigs, and the legislature approved proposals to create a new state bank and to expand state support for internal improvements such as roads, railroads, and canals. An advocate for public education, Cannon designated some revenues from the state bank to pay for schools. Cannon was publicly criticized for his implementation of the new laws, especially in East Tennessee, where voters grew impatient over his lack of support for the Hiwassee Railroad.

In 1839, state Democrats, determined to defeat Cannon, convinced rising politician and Speaker of the U.S. House of Representatives James K. Polk to run against him. The two candidates toured the state together to give a series of public debates, the first of which took place at Murfreesboro on April 11, 1839. Cannon typically delivered slower, more methodical arguments, and was outshone in the debates by the quicker and wittier Polk. In the election, Polk narrowly defeated Cannon by 2,675 votes.

Cannon wanted to run against Polk in 1841, but Whig leaders instead nominated James C. Jones, thinking that Cannon would not be able to defeat Polk.

Cannon died in Nashville at the age of sixty, just two years after his last candidacy for governor. He is interred in a cemetery on the grounds of his estate in Williamson County near Allisona.

=== Opposition to Andrew Jackson ===
Throughout his political career, Newton Cannon was known for his personal and political antagonism toward Andrew Jackson, whose policies he consistently opposed. Three different supposed interactions between the two men all have been suggested as explanations for the origin of Cannon's antipathy to Jackson. The earliest of these interactions involved a horse track known as Clover Bottom that Jackson owned together with a pair of brothers, William and Patten Anderson. Cannon is purported to have lost substantial amounts of money and other possessions from gambling at Clover Bottom, and is said to have blamed Jackson and the Andersons for his losses, suspecting them of fixing races. The second encounter occurred in 1812 when Cannon served on a jury in a trial of Jonathan Magness who, with his two sons David and Perry Green, had been accused of murder in the death of Patten Anderson. After the jury returned a verdict of not guilty, Jackson is said to have shaken his fist at Cannon, saying "I'll mark you, young man." Perhaps the most compelling explanation is Cannon's disapproval of Jackson's military leadership when he served as a detachment leader under Jackson's command during the Creek War. Cannon is said to have believed that Jackson had deliberately exposed Cannon and his men to unnecessary dangers.

== Family life and legacy ==
Cannon was married twice. In 1813, he married Leah Pryor Perkins. She died in 1816. In 1818, he married Rachel Starnes Willborn. He was the father of ten children. A daughter, Rachel Adeline Cannon Maney, was for many years an owner of the Oaklands estate in Murfreesboro. The Civil War journals of a grandson, also named Newton Cannon, were published in 1963 as The Reminiscences of Newton Cannon: First Sergeant, 11th Tennessee Cavalry, C.S.A.

Cannon County, Tennessee, which was established during Cannon's governorship, is named in his honor.

Party political offices
First	Whig nominee for Governor of Tennessee; 1837, 1839	Succeeded by James C. Jones
U.S. House of Representatives
Preceded by Felix Grundy	U.S. Representative for Tennessee's 5th congressional district 1814-1817	Succeeded by Thomas Claiborne
Preceded by George Washington Lent Marr	U.S. Representative for Tennessee's 4th congressional district 1819-1823	Succeeded by Sam Houston
Political offices
Preceded by William Carroll	Governor of Tennessee; 1835-1839	Succeeded by James K. Polk
