= 1837 Tennessee gubernatorial election =

- August 3, 1837
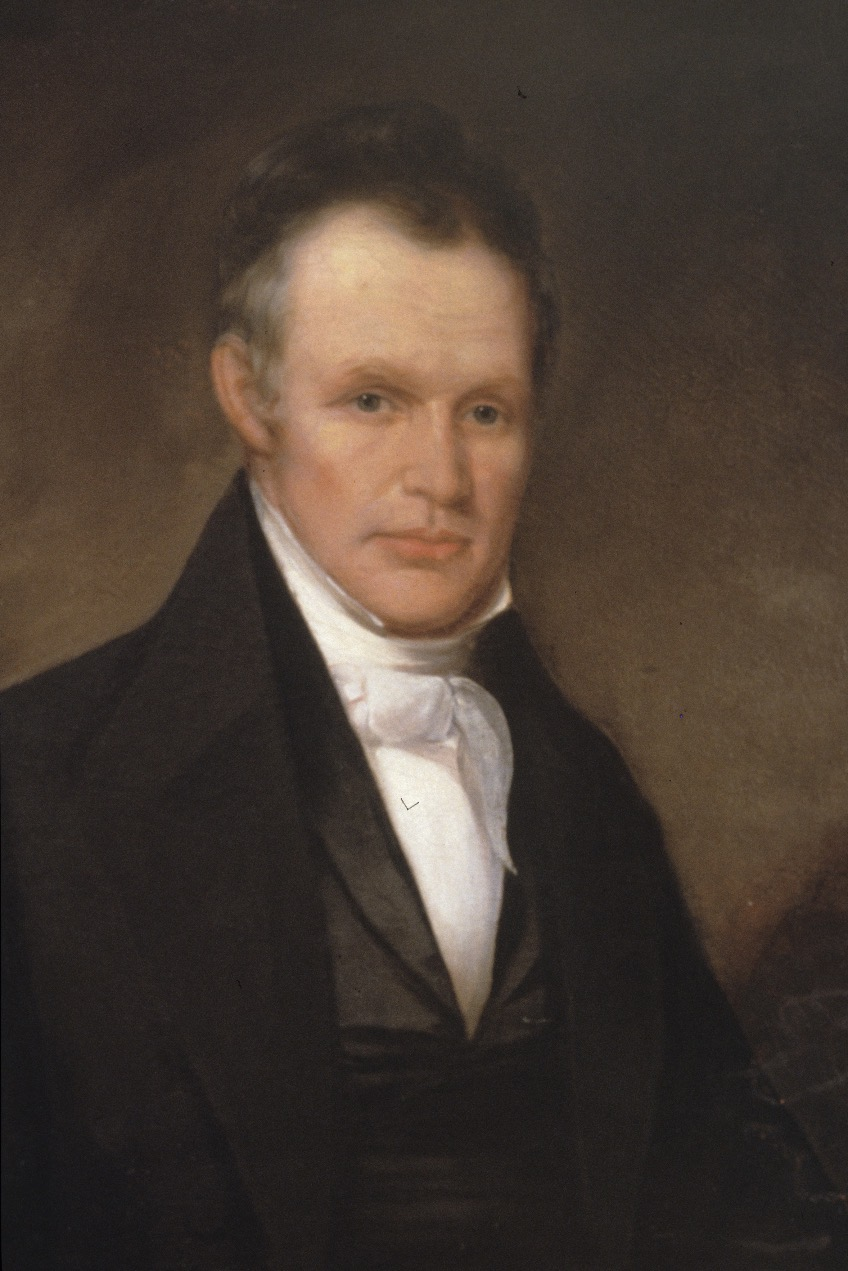

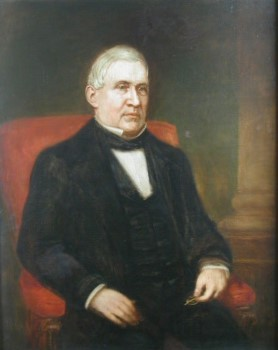
Nominee	Newton Cannon	Robert Armstrong
Party	Whig	Democratic
Popular vote	51,344	33,954
Percentage	60.19%	39.81%
- County results Cannon: 50–60% 60–70% 70–80% 80–90% 90–100% Armstrong: 50–60% 60–70% 70–80% 80–90% No Data/Vote
Governor before election
Newton Cannon
Whig
Elected Governor
Newton Cannon
Whig

The 1837 Tennessee gubernatorial election was held on August 3, 1837, to elect the Governor of Tennessee. Whig nominee and incumbent Governor Newton Cannon won re-election against Democratic nominee and Brigadier General Robert Armstrong.

== General election ==
On election day, August 3, 1837, Whig candidate Newton Cannon won re-election by a margin of 17,390 votes against his opponent Democratic candidate Robert Armstrong, thereby retaining Whig control over the office of Governor. Cannon was sworn in for his second term on October 12, 1837.

=== Results ===
Tennessee gubernatorial election, 1837
Party	Candidate	Votes	%
Whig	Newton Cannon (incumbent)	51,344	60.19
Democratic	Robert Armstrong	33,954	39.81
Total votes		85,298	100.00
Whig hold			
