= 1839 Tennessee gubernatorial election =

- August 1, 1839
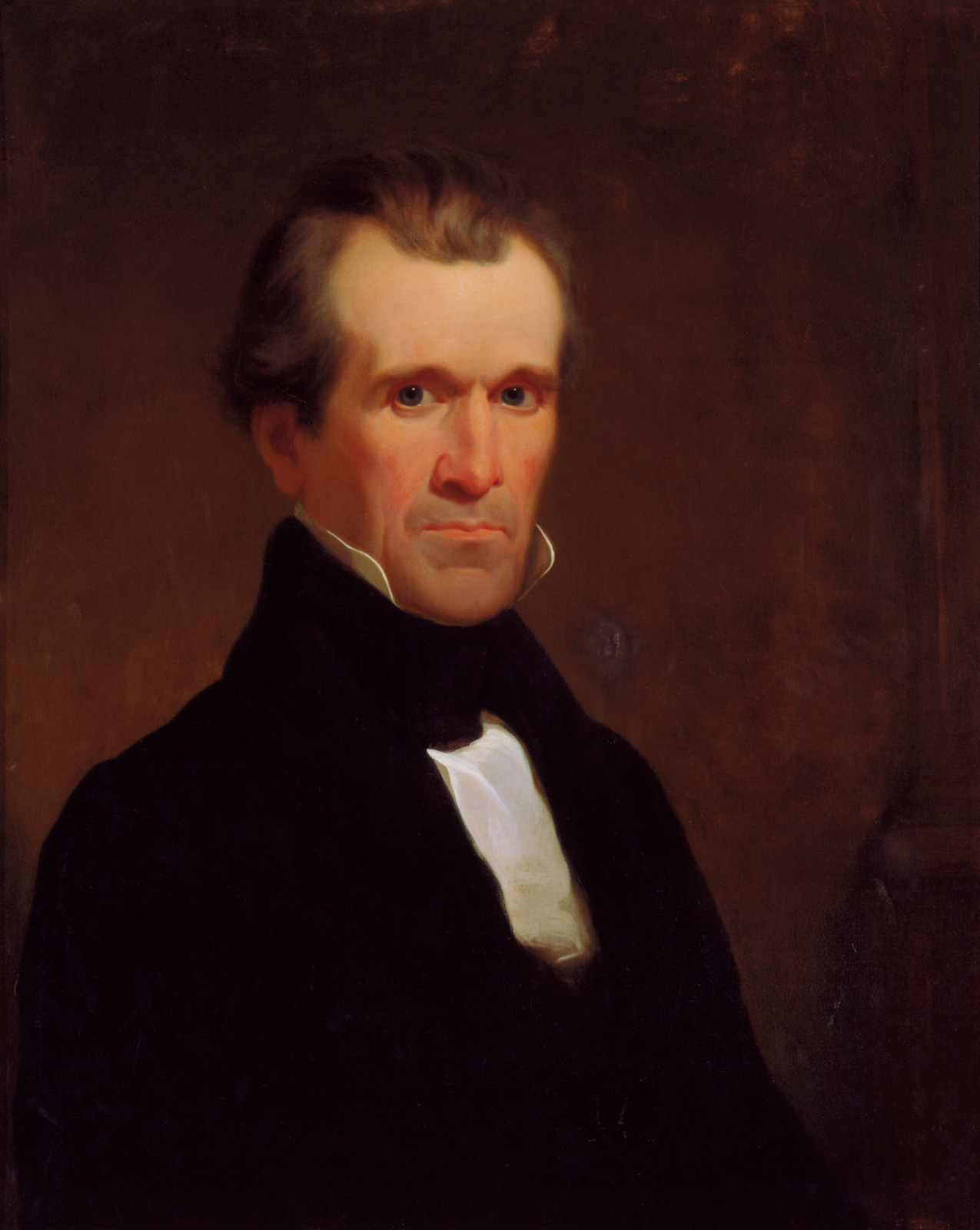

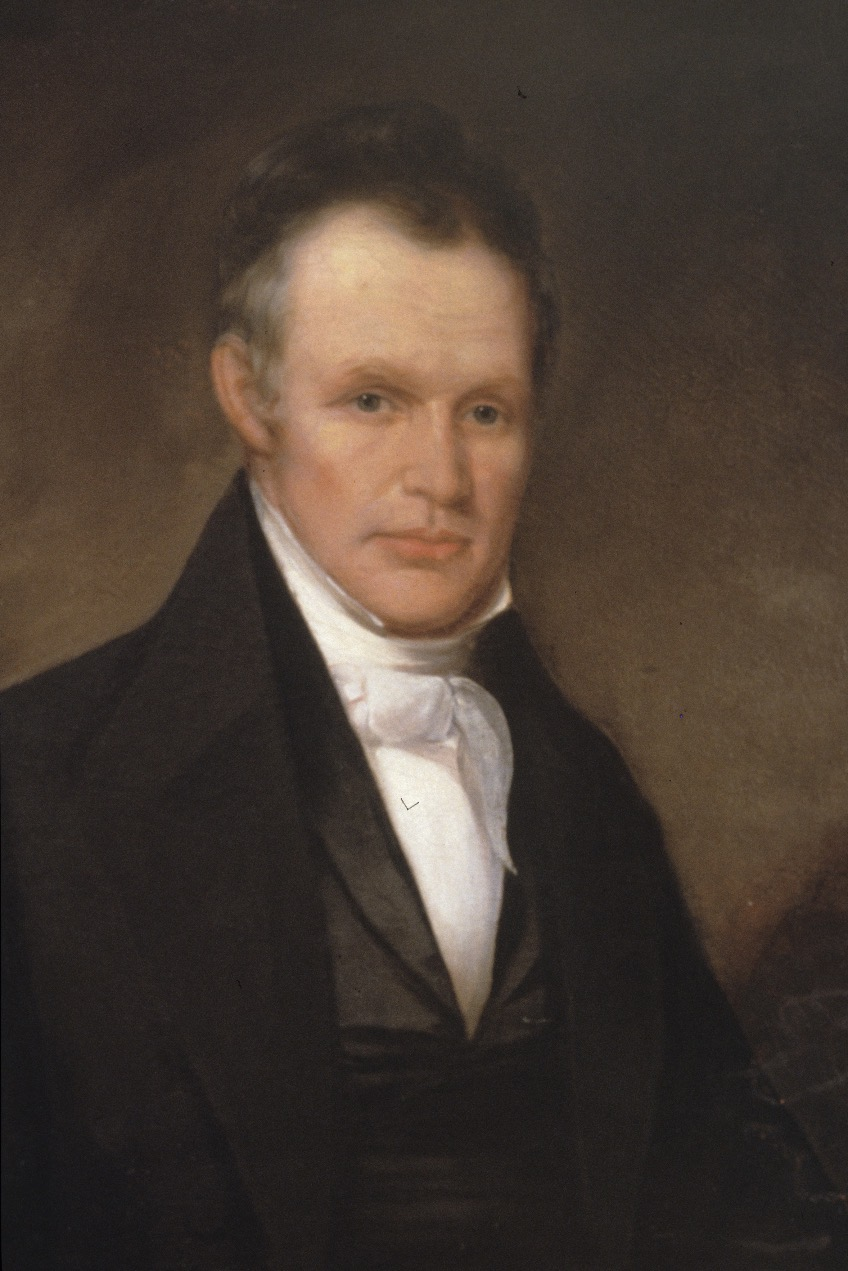
| Nominee | James K. Polk | Newton Cannon |
| Party | Democratic | Whig |
| Popular vote | 54,062 | 51,387 |
| Percentage | 51.27% | 48.73% |
- County results Polk: 50–60% 60–70% 70–80% 80–90% Cannon: 50–60% 60–70% 70–80% 80–90% No data/No votes
Governor before election
Newton Cannon
Whig
Elected Governor
James K. Polk
Democratic

The 1839 Tennessee gubernatorial election was held on August 1, 1839, to elect the Governor of Tennessee. Incumbent Whig Governor Newton Cannon lost re-election to a third term against Democratic nominee and former Speaker of the United States House of Representatives James K. Polk.

== Background ==
Democrats, determined to defeat governor Cannon, convinced rising politician and Speaker of the U.S. House of Representatives James K. Polk to run against him. The two candidates toured the state together to give a series of public debates, the first of which took place at Murfreesboro on April 11, 1839. Cannon typically delivered slower, more methodical arguments and was outshone in the debates by the quicker and wittier Polk. In the election, Polk narrowly defeated Cannon.

== General election ==
On election day, August 1, 1839, Democratic nominee James K. Polk won the election by a margin of 2,675 votes against his Whig opponent and incumbent Governor Newton Cannon, thereby gaining Democratic control over the office of Governor. Polk was sworn in as the 9th Governor of Tennessee on October 14, 1839.

=== Results ===
Tennessee gubernatorial election, 1839
| Party | Candidate | Votes | % |
|---|---|---|---|
| Democratic | James K. Polk | 54,062 | 51.27% |
| Whig | Newton Cannon (incumbent) | 51,387 | 48.73% |
| Total votes | | 105,449 | 100.00% |
| Democratic gain from Whig | | | |
