= 1825 Tennessee gubernatorial election =

- August 4–5, 1825
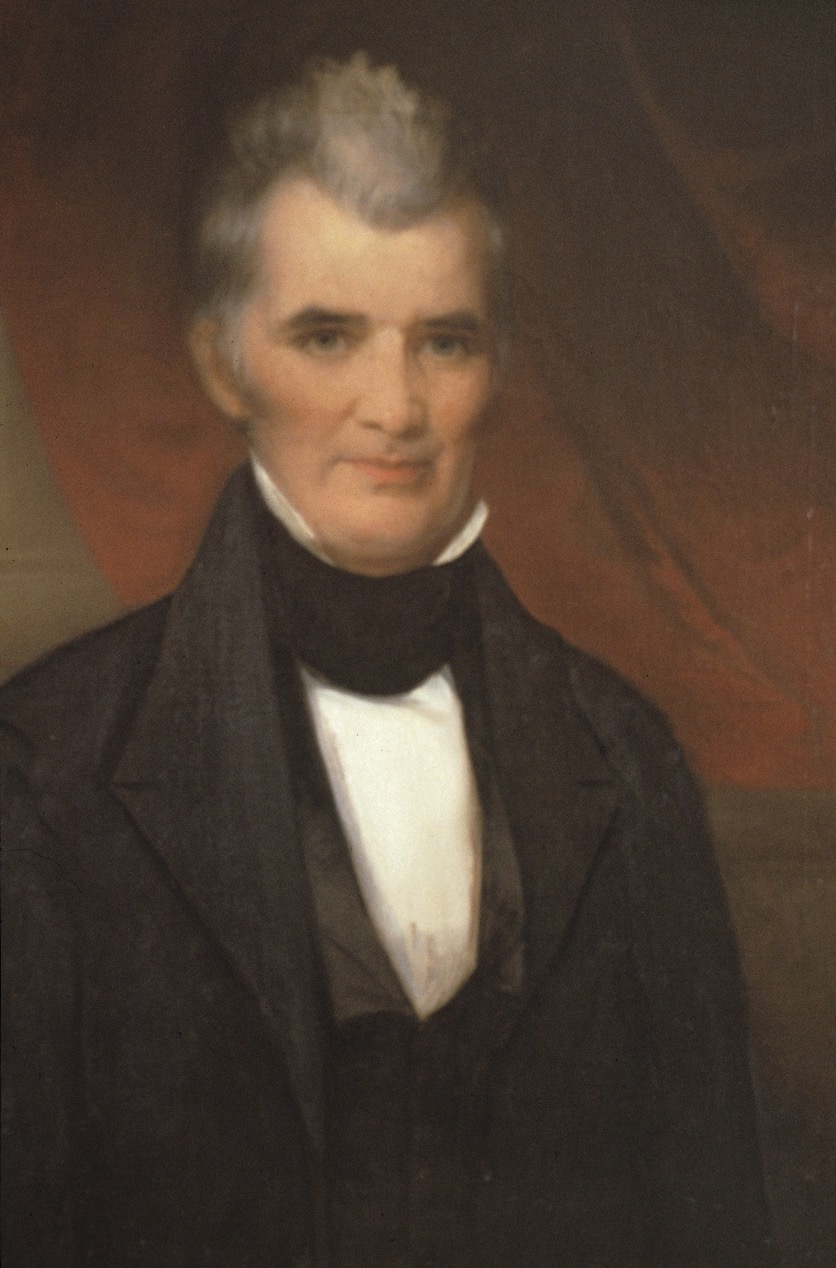
Nominee	William Carroll
Party	Democratic-Republican
Popular vote	34,284
Percentage	99.93%
- County results Carroll: 90–100% No Data/Vote
Governor before election
William Carroll
Democratic-Republican
Elected Governor
William Carroll
Democratic-Republican

The 1825 Tennessee gubernatorial election was held between August 4 and 5, 1825 in order to elect the Governor of Tennessee. Democratic-Republican nominee and incumbent Governor William Carroll easily won re-election as he ran unopposed.

== General election ==
On election day, August 4, 1825, Democratic-Republican candidate William Carroll won re-election by a margin of 34,284 votes against a handful of scattering votes, thereby retaining Democratic-Republican control over the office of Governor. Carroll was sworn in for his third term on October 1, 1825.

=== Results ===
Tennessee gubernatorial election, 1825
Party	Candidate	Votes	%
Democratic-Republican	William Carroll (incumbent)	34,284	99.93
	Scattering	24	0.07
Total votes		34,308	100.00
Democratic-Republican hold			
