= 1821 Tennessee gubernatorial election =

- August 2–3, 1821
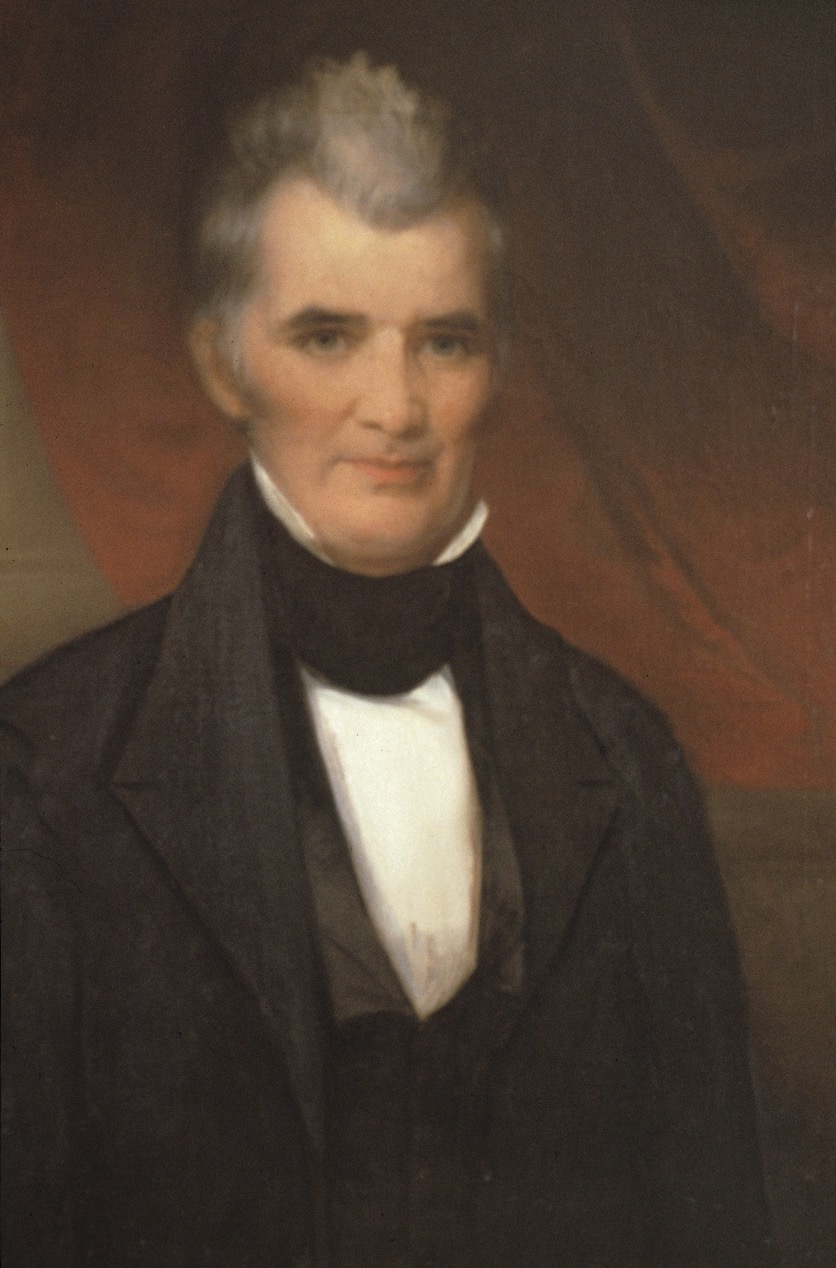

Nominee	William Carroll	Edward Ward
Party	Democratic-Republican
Popular vote	43,313	11,079
Percentage	79.61%	20.36%
- County results Carroll: 50–60% 60–70% 70–80% 80–90% 90–100% Ward: 60–70% 70–80% No Data/Vote
Governor before election
Joseph McMinn
Democratic-Republican
Elected Governor
William Carroll
Democratic-Republican

The 1821 Tennessee gubernatorial election was held between August 2 and 3 in 1821 in order to elect the Governor of Tennessee. Democratic-Republican nominee and Major General William Carroll defeated Edward Ward. As of June 1821 the Knoxville Register listed Robert Weakley as a candidate as well.

== General election ==
On election day, August 2, 1821, Democratic-Republican candidate William Carroll won the election by a margin of 32,234 votes against his opponent Edward Ward, thereby retaining Democratic-Republican control over the office of Governor. Carroll was sworn in as the 5th Governor of Tennessee on October 1, 1821.

=== Results ===
Tennessee gubernatorial election, 1821
Party	Candidate	Votes	%
Democratic-Republican	William Carroll	43,313	79.61
	Edward Ward	11,079	20.36
	Scattering	18	0.03
Total votes		54,410	100.00
Democratic-Republican hold			
