= George Dury =

Bavarian-American painter

Friedrich Julius Georg Dury
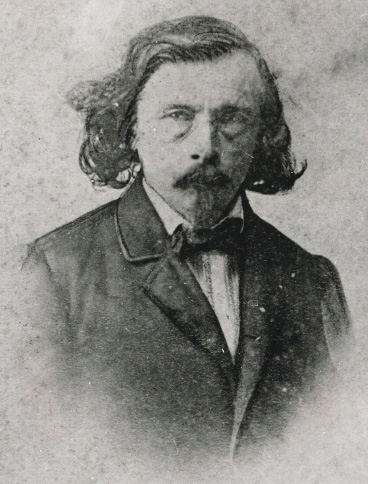
- Self-portrait, 1860
- Born: March 15, 1817; Würzburg, Kingdom of Bavaria
- Died: December 2, 1894 (aged 77); Nashville, Tennessee, U.S.
- Resting place: Mount Olivet Cemetery, Nashville
- Known for: Portrait painting
- Notable work: Sarah Polk's White House Portrait. Portrait of Lola Montez
- Patrons: Ludwig I of Bavaria

Friedrich Julius Georg Dury (1817–1894) was a well-regarded Bavarian-American portrait artist who worked in both oil and pastel. He was born and educated in Würzburg, Bavaria, and Munich, where he began his career as an artist.

In 1849, after the Revolutions of 1848, Dury emigrated to the United States with his sister and their respective spouses, whom they had married shortly before departure. He became a bespoke gallery artist in Nashville, Tennessee. He and his family struggled during the American Civil War because Nashville was occupied by Union troops for three years. Soldiers or officers were often billeted with townspeople, and some took the families' food.

After the war, the Tennessee state legislature commissioned several portraits from Dury, including of the late President Abraham Lincoln (assassinated in 1865) and his successor Andrew Johnson, the former vice- president. An 1870 review in a Nashville newspaper said Dury was an artist "who has caught his inspiration from the old masters". Dury typically did not sign his paintings.

Dury's work is on display in the US White House, the National Portrait Gallery, the Cheekwood Botanical Garden and Museum of Art, and the Tennessee State Museum.

== Early life and education ==
George Dury was born in Würzburg in the Kingdom of Bavaria in 1817, the first of Nicholas and Augusta (née Lommler) Dury's three children. Showing early talent, Dury was admitted as a student at the age of 13 to the Academy of Fine Arts (Akademie der Bildenden Künste München) in Munich. He graduated eight years later at the age of 21.

== Early artistic acclaim ==
While a student at the Academy of Fine Arts, Dury developed a technique of using encaustic painting that closely resembled the highly popular portraiture on ivory. Miniature paintings on ivory are particularly vulnerable due to fading from sunlight and ivory's ability to absorb contaminants. Dury's novel technique was hailed as "widely superior to ivory pictures and even more durable than oil-paintings".

Using his new technique, Dury became known for his talent in painting small cabinet portraits, including his paintings of Prince Adalbert of Bavaria and Queen Consort Therese of Saxe-Hildburghausen.

== Early European career ==
King Ludwig I of Bavaria became Dury's patron, hiring the artist as court painter. He charged Dury to paint Ludwig I's Irish-born mistress Eliza Gilbert (better known by her stage name Lola Montez). Dury brought a copy of the painting of Gilbert with him when he immigrated to the US. Dury also painted a miniature of Grand Duke Alexei Alexandrovich of Russia.

== Later career in the United States ==
Dury emigrated to the United States in 1849, after the Revolutions of 1848, with his 19-year old fiancée Katherine Schaeffer, and his sister Josephine and her fiancé Augustin Gattinger. Both couples were married April 24, 1849, at the American consulate in Le Havre, France before sailing to the United States.

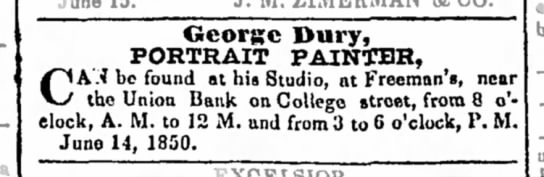
An image of an 1850 newspaper ad for George Dury, artist, Nashville, Tennessee

Landing in New York City, they took a train to the "end of the line", Dalton, Georgia. From there they took a stagecoach to Chattanooga, Tennessee, where Dury first settled in nearby Wartburg, Morgan County.

He quickly relocated to the more promising city of Nashville, Tennessee, the following year, in 1850. Initially Dury taught oil painting at the Nashville Female Academy. Dury also set up a second-story studio at No. 43 Union Street, accepting commissions as a portrait artist.

=== US Civil War disruption ===
Dury lost his job teaching when the Nashville Academy closed at the beginning of the US Civil War. The Dury family home was often a target for Union soldiers who occupied Nashville from 1862 to the end of the war. Soldiers "regularly raided the kitchen - stripping hot bread from the oven and taking milk from the children". The Union army billeted soldiers in the Dury home. One soldier died of typhoid fever in Mrs. Dury's arms, thinking she was his mother.

But, Dury continued to paint portraits of both Union and Confederate officers during the Civil War, including Gen. Robert E. Lee. It is thought Dury painted the portrait from a sculpture that he had made of Lee. The Lee portrait is in a private collection in Virginia. A smaller copy painted by Dury hangs in Lee's historic home "Arlington", just across the Potomac River from Washington, DC.

=== State of Tennessee commission ===
In May 1866, the Tennessee state legislature passed a resolution to pay Dury a $1,000 commission for a portrait of Gen. George H. Thomas, commander of Union forces during the Battle of Nashville. The state legislature later commissioned Dury to paint portraits of presidents Abraham Lincoln, who was assassinated in 1865, and his successor, Andrew Johnson. Dury also painted a portrait of Reconstruction era Tennessee Governor Parson Brownlow. The Thomas and Brownlow portraits were displayed in the state capitol, and were controversial among Confederate sympathizer state legislators, who would often spit on them.

=== Nashville's "Academy of Fine Arts" ===
In 1872, Dury met with professional "artists and amateurs" in the studio of artist Robert Loftin Newman, where he joined fellow artists who were trying "to establish an Academy of Fine Arts for the purpose of... advancing the cause of art in our midst" in Nashville. Dury was elected vice-president during the meeting. Plans were discussed to purchase and display copies of important European works of art, including statues and paintings.

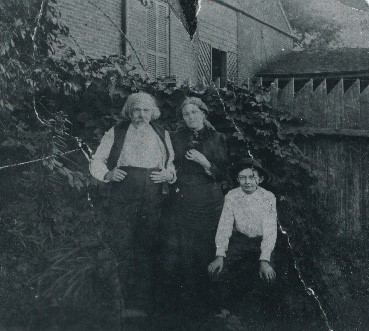
Dury with wife and grandson.

=== List of Dury portrait subjects ===
Many of Dury's early and most important portraits were donated to the Tennessee State Museum by his grandson Robert Dury of Melbourne Beach, Florida. Dury's portraits of William Walker and Lola Montez are in the Tennessee State Museum.

He also painted James D. Porter, Robert Armstrong, Governor William Gannaway Brownlow, President Andrew Johnson, Queen Consort Therese of Saxe-Hildburghausen, and Tennessee GovernorWilliam Brimage Bate. A portrait of Randal William McGavock is also attributed to Dury.

=== Dury portraits of Sarah Childress Polk ===
In 1878, during a conversation in Dansville, New York, it was noted the White House did not have a portrait of President Polk's wife Sarah Childress Polk. Frances Willard, national president of the Woman's Christian Temperance Union, created a committee to commission Dury to paint a life portrait of Mrs. Polk. She was seventy-five years old when she sat for the artist.

Dury completed another portrait of Sarah Childress Polk in 1883, 34 years after President Polk's term had ended. Dury modeled his oil on canvas portrait after George P. A. Healy's 1846 portrait of Mrs. Polk. Dury's painting hangs in the East Wing of the White House.

== Death and burial ==
Dury died of "old age", December 2, 1894, at the home of his married daughter Augusta Brengelman, at 711 Russell Street in Nashville, Tennessee. He had been paralyzed for six years before his death, likely by a stroke. He was buried at Mount Olivet Cemetery in Nashville.

== Gallery ==
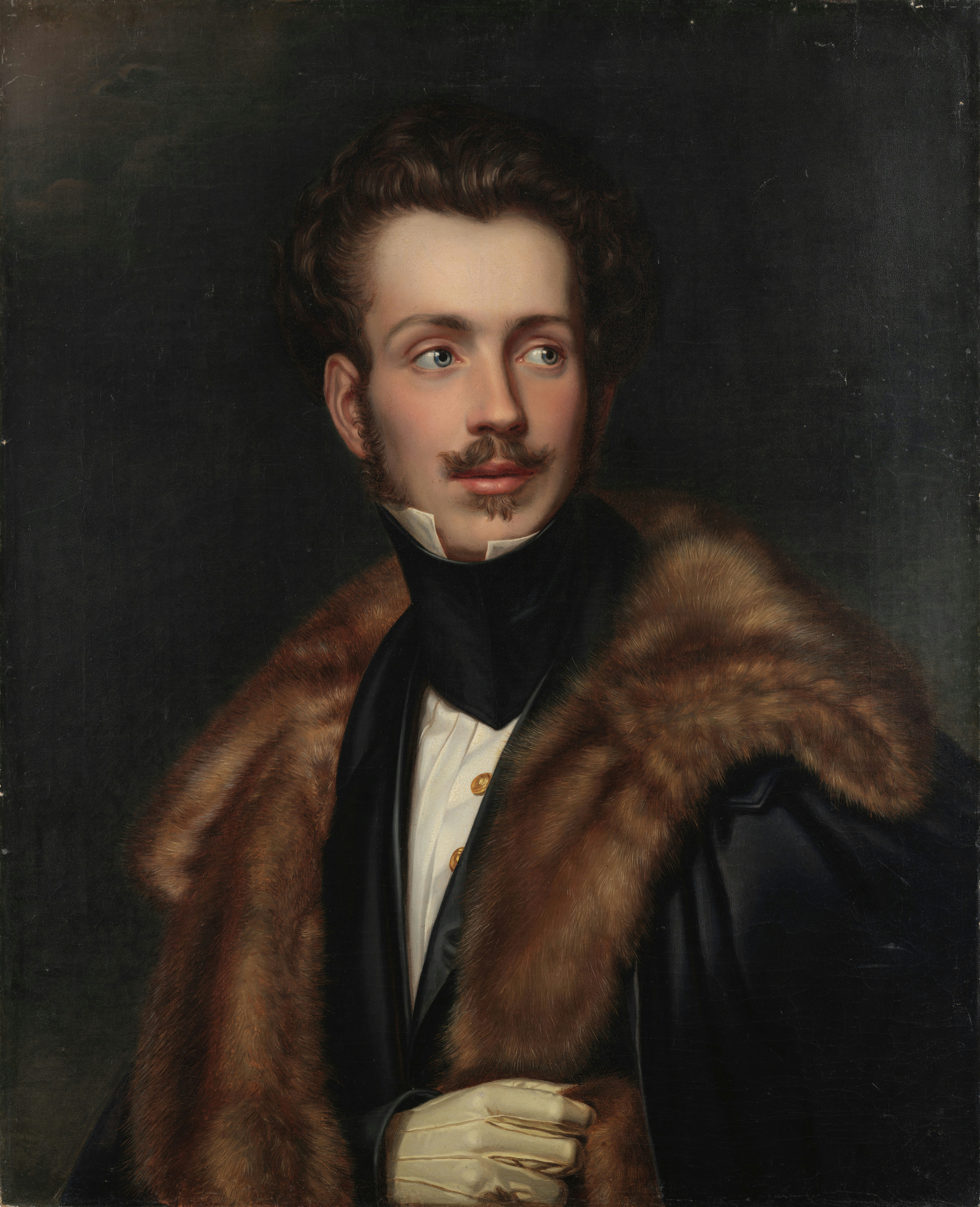
D. Augusto, Duke of Leuchtenberg, circa 1835, oil painting on canvas, 72.2 x 58 cm (28 1/3 x 22.1825 in.), collection of The National Portrait Gallery, The Smithsonian Institution

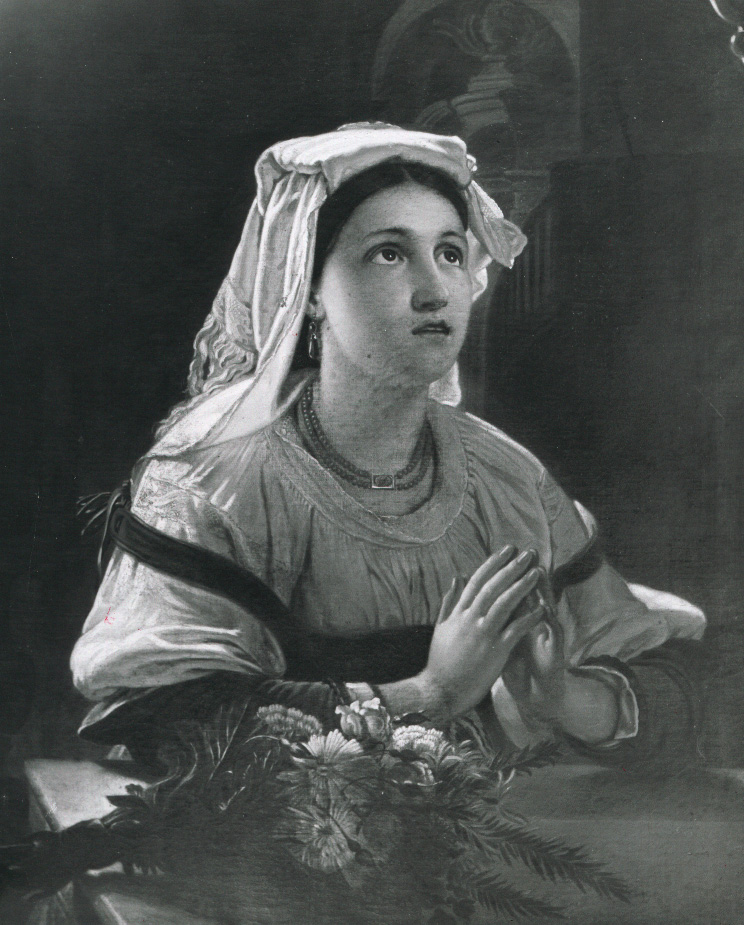
Italian Girl at Prayer, circa 1848, oil painting, 0 × 0 cm (0 x 0 in.), collection of Tennessee State Library and Archives

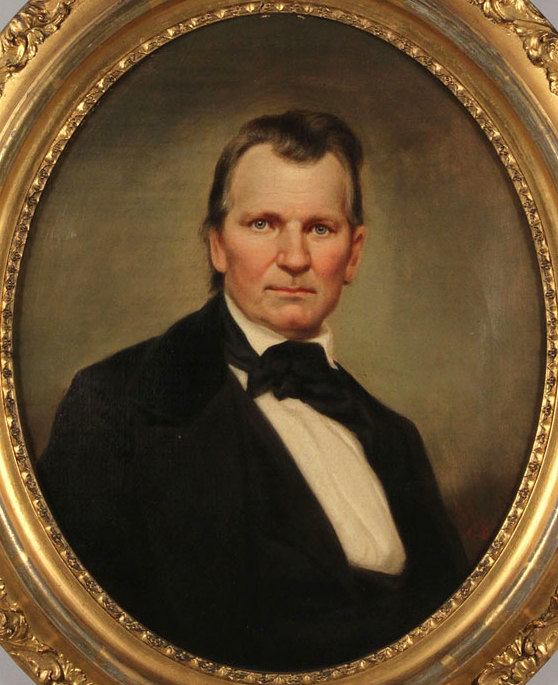
Daniel Smith Donelson, circa 1850, oil painting, 34.9 x 41 cm (13.7 x 16.2 in.), collection of Historic Rock Castle, Hendersonville, Tennessee

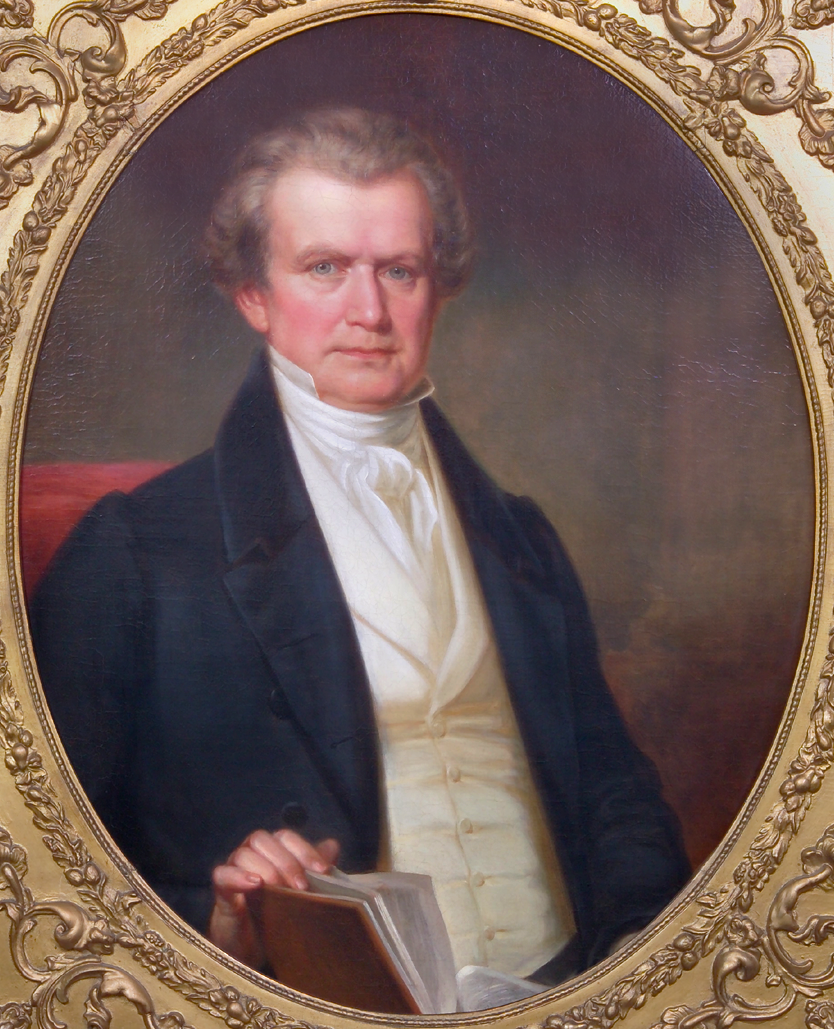
Attorney General Felix Grundy, 1858, oil painting, 85.1 cm × 67.9 cm (33.5 in × 26.7 in), collection of The National Portrait Gallery, Smithsonian Institution

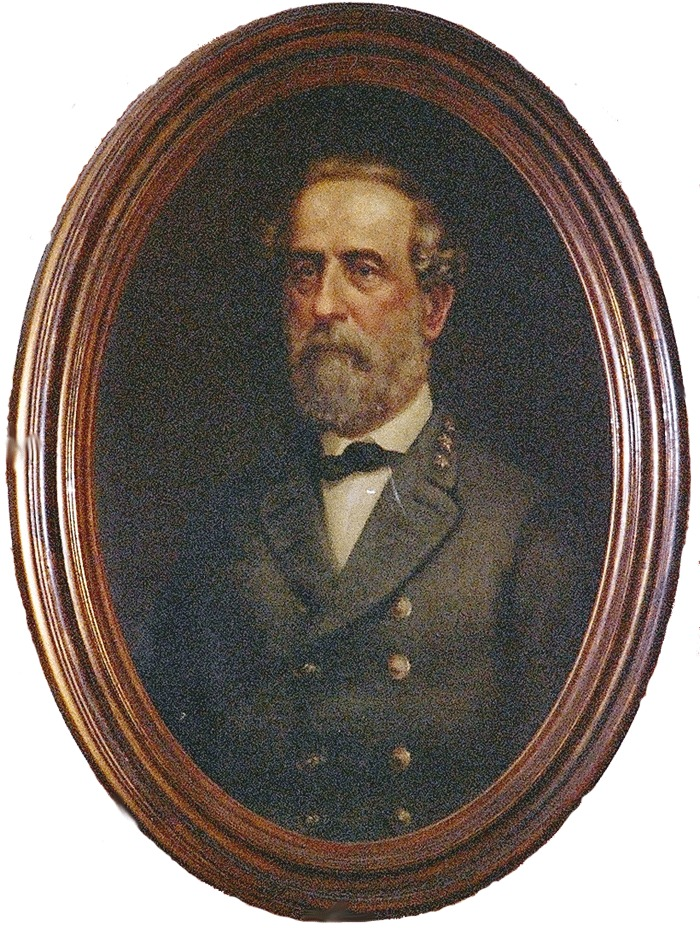
Robert E. Lee, circa 1865, oil painting, 68.6 cm × 53.5 cm (27.0 in × 21.1 in), Private collection

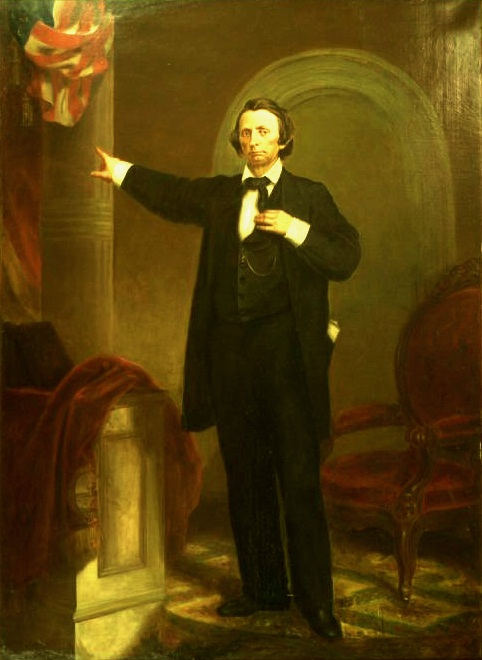
William Brownlow, Tennessee, circa 1866, oil painting, collection of Tennessee State Library and Archives

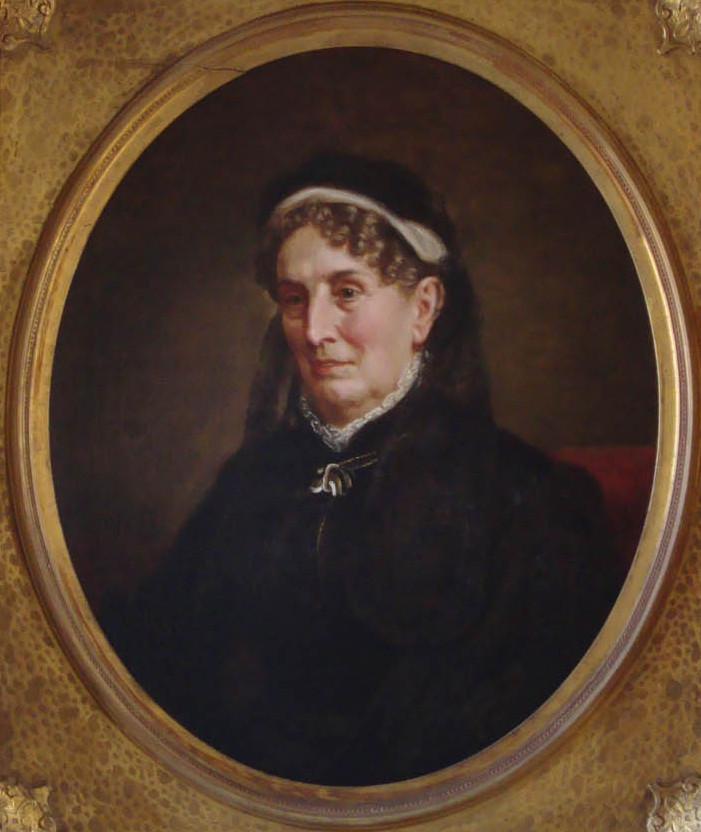
Sarah Childress Polk (at age 75), 1878, oil painting, James K. Polk Home Collection, Columbia, Tennessee

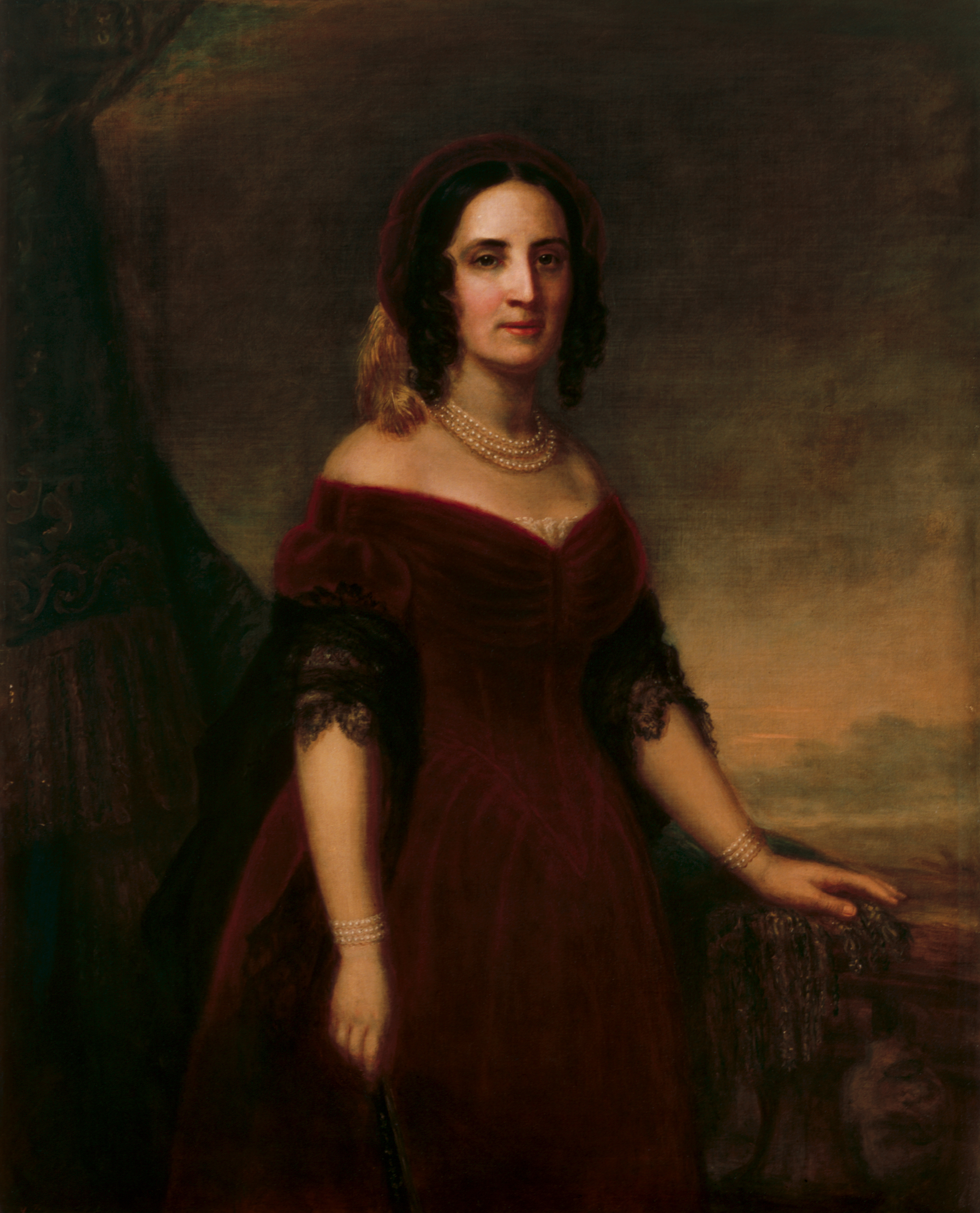
Mrs. James K. Polk, 1883, oil painting, 127.6 cm × 102.2 cm (50.2 in × 40.2 in)

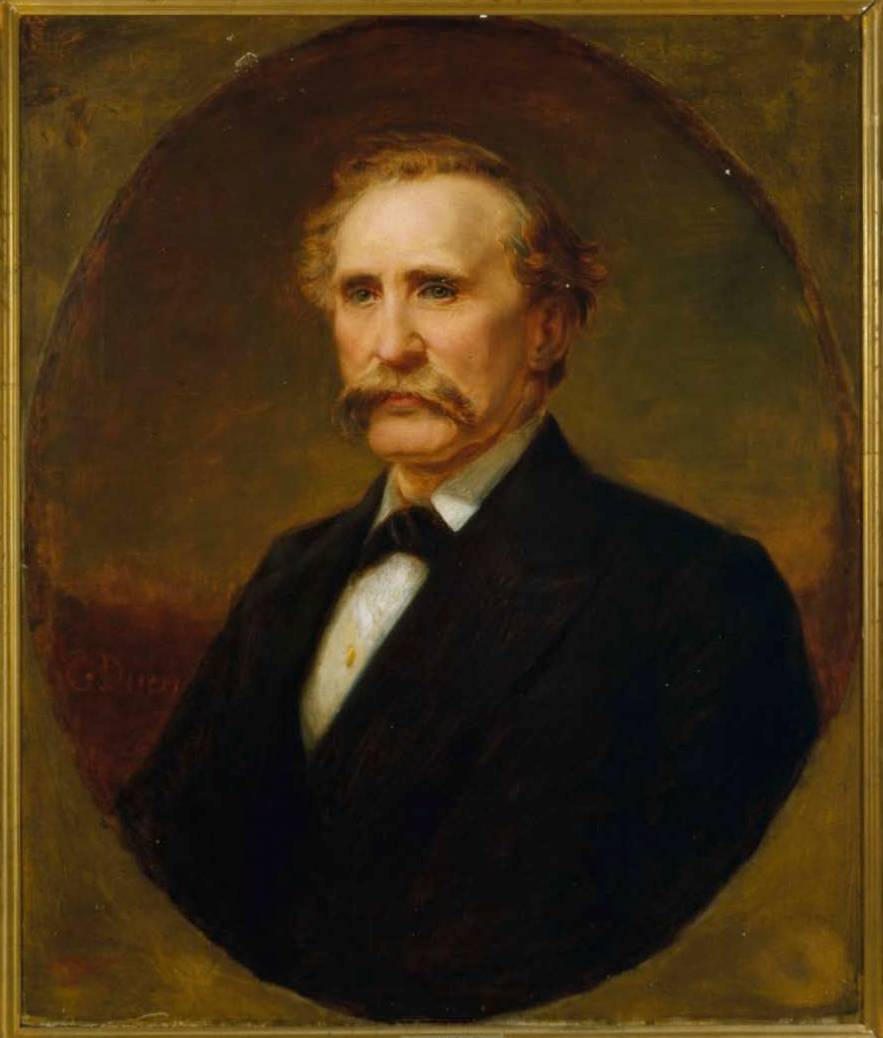
William Brimage Bate, circa 1894, oil painting, 75 cm × 62.3 cm (29.5 in × 24.5 in), collection of Tennessee State Library and Archives

== Exhibitions ==
1886; Solo exhibit - Tennessee Historical Society at Watkins Institute, Nashville, Tennessee,
