= 1823 Tennessee gubernatorial election =

- August 7–8, 1823
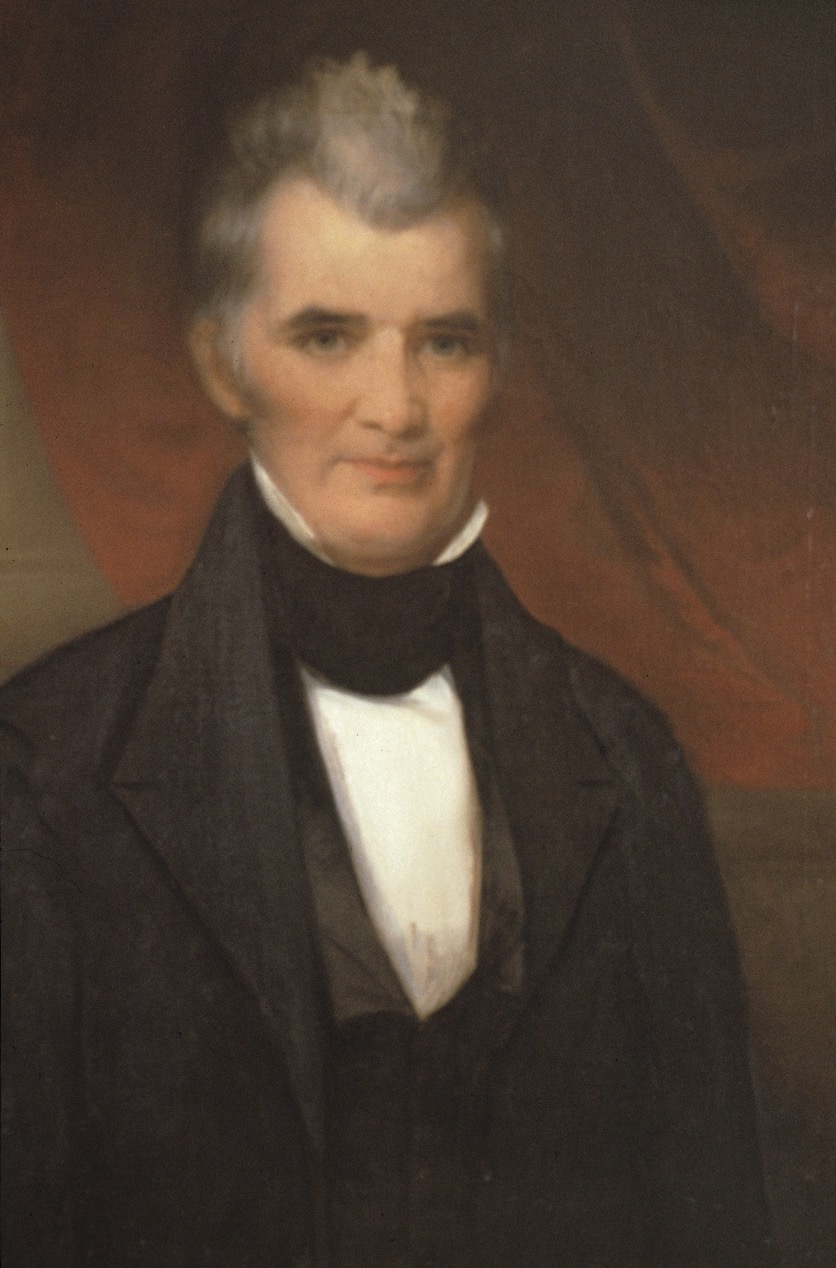
| Nominee | William Carroll |
| Party | Democratic-Republican |
| Popular vote | 40,174 |
| Percentage | 99.04% |
- County results Carroll: 80–90% 90–100% No Data/Vote
Governor before election
William Carroll
Democratic-Republican
Elected Governor
William Carroll
Democratic-Republican

The 1823 Tennessee gubernatorial election was held between August 7 and 8, 1823 in order to elect the Governor of Tennessee. Democratic-Republican nominee and incumbent Governor William Carroll easily won re-election as he ran nearly unopposed.

== General election ==
On election day, August 7, 1823, Democratic-Republican candidate William Carroll won re-election by a margin of 39,828 votes against a number of scattering votes, thereby retaining Democratic-Republican control over the office of Governor. Carroll was sworn in for his second term on October 1, 1823.

=== Results ===
Tennessee gubernatorial election, 1823
| Party | Candidate | Votes | % |
|---|---|---|---|
| Democratic-Republican | William Carroll (incumbent) | 40,174 | 99.04 |
| | Scattering | 389 | 0.96 |
| Total votes | | 40,563 | 100.00 |
| Democratic-Republican hold | | | |
