= 1833 Tennessee gubernatorial election =

- August 1–2, 1833
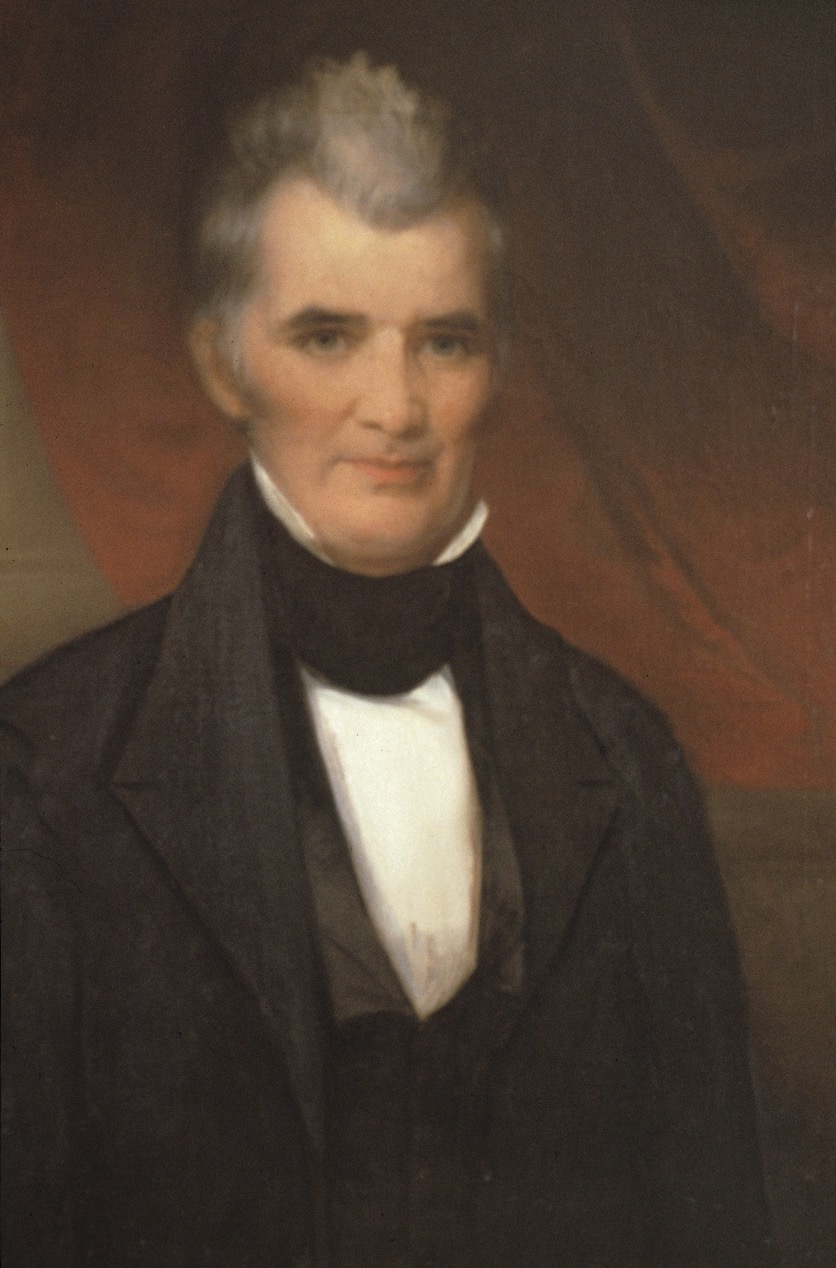

Nominee	William Carroll	Scattering
Party	Democratic	N/A
Popular vote	53,224	1,201
Percentage	97.79%	2.21%
- County results Carroll: 50–60% 70–80% >90% Scattering 50–60% Unknown/No votes
Governor before election
William Carroll
Democratic
Elected Governor
William Carroll
Democratic

The 1833 Tennessee gubernatorial election was held between August 1 and 2, 1833 in order to elect the Governor of Tennessee. Democratic nominee and incumbent Governor William Carroll easily won re-election as he ran unopposed.

== General election ==
On election day, August 1, 1833, Democratic candidate William Carroll won re-election by a margin of 52,023 votes against a number of scattering votes, thereby retaining Democratic control over the office of Governor. Carroll was sworn in for his sixth overall term on October 1, 1833.

=== Results ===
Tennessee gubernatorial election, 1833
Party	Candidate	Votes	%
Democratic	William Carroll (incumbent)	53,224	97.79%
	Scattering	1,201	2.21%
Total votes		54,425	100.00%
Democratic hold			
