= Edward Ward (businessman) =

19th-century Tennessee politician

Edward Ward (1770s? – December 22, 1837) was a businessman and politician of the United States. Originally from Virginia, Ward was a land owner and Tennessee state legislator. Ward bought Andrew Jackson's second plantation, the 640-acre Hunter's Hill, from him for $10,000 in 1804. Ward served as president of the Clover Bottom Jockey Club, reportedly won $500 in gold off Andrew Jackson in a bet on a fight between gaffed cocks, and along with Jackson was involved in land speculations in the vicinity of Huntsville, and Florence, Alabama. In 1809, Ward bought 4,500 acres (7.0 mi^{2}) of land in western Madison County, Alabama for over US$13,000 (equivalent to $267,606 in 2025).

Ward served three terms in the Tennessee legislature. In the wake of the Panic of 1819, Jackson and Ward opposed an act for the relief of debtors, and "addressed a memorial of protest to the assembly which that body refused to accept on the ground that its language was disrespectful to the lawmakers. The memorial did, in fact, charge the members who voted for the loan office act with perjury since they had taken an oath to support the Constitution of the United States, and now assented to a law which made something beside gold and silver a tender in payment of debts."

He ran for governor but lost the 1821 Tennessee gubernatorial election to William Carroll. Ward was brutally murdered in 1837 by four of his nephews. An account of the murder was included in American Slavery As It Is (1839) as an instance of depraved violence that the editors sought to associate with slave ownership.

== Sources ==
- Abernethy, Thomas P. (1927). "Andrew Jackson and the Rise of South-Western Democracy". The American Historical Review. 33 (1): 64–77. doi:10.2307/1838111. ISSN 0002-8762.
- Dupre, Daniel S. (1997). Transforming the Cotton Frontier: Madison County, Alabama, 1800–1840. Baton Rouge: Louisiana State University Press. ISBN 978-0-8071-2193-1. LCCN 97016094.
- Hall, Rita Hiltenbrand (2010). "Colonel Edward Ward: The Life and Death of a Tennessee Senator". West Tennessee Historical Society Papers. LXIV. Memphis, Tennessee: 45–89. ISSN 0361-6215. OCLC 1769643.
- Various; Jackson, Andrew (1984). Moser, Harold D.; MacPherson, Sharon (eds.). The Papers of Andrew Jackson, Volume II, 1804–1813. Knoxville, Tennessee: University of Tennessee Press. ISBN 978-0-87049-441-3. LCCN 79015078. OCLC 5029597.
