= 1831 Tennessee gubernatorial election =

- August 4–5, 1831
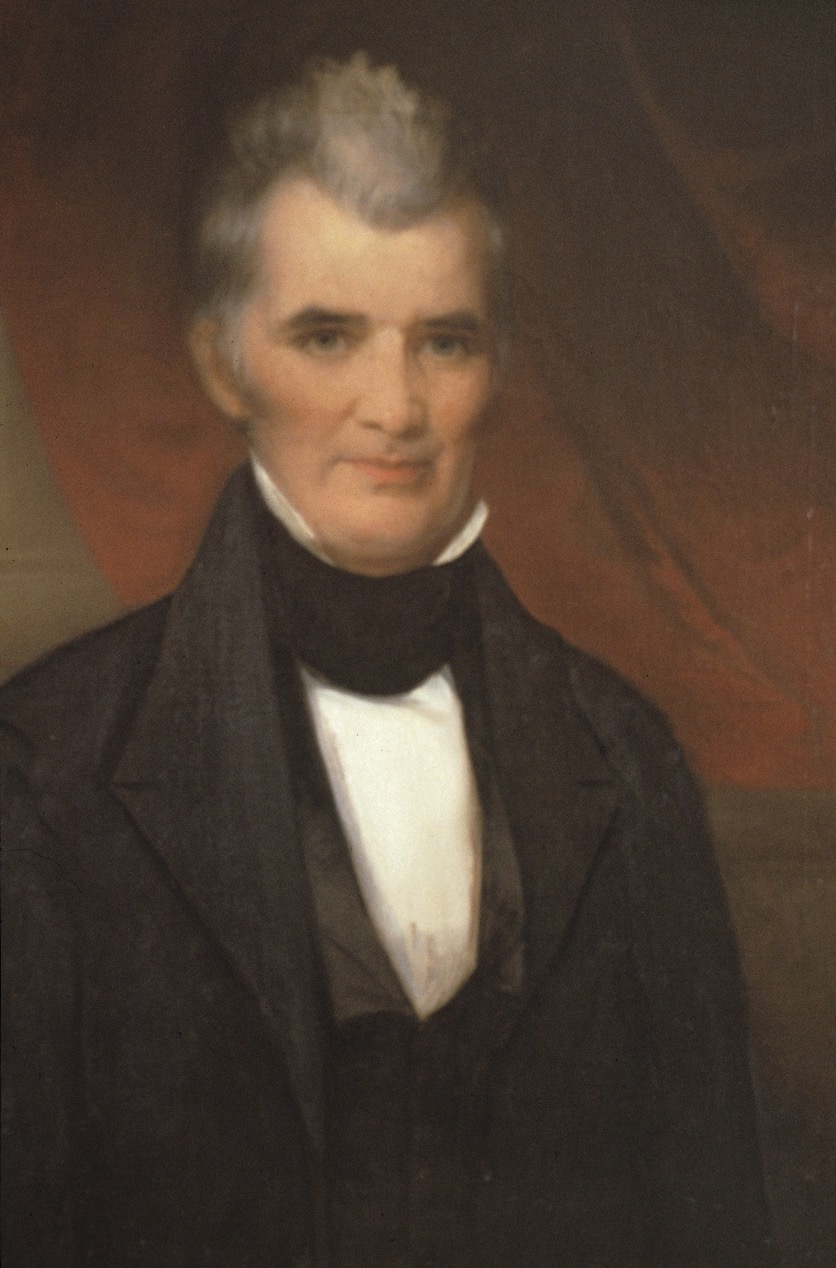
Nominee	William Carroll
Party	Jacksonian
Popular vote	63,694
Percentage	97.03%
- County results Carroll: 60–70% 70–80% 80–90% >90% Unknown/No votes
Governor before election
William Carroll
Jacksonian
Elected Governor
William Carroll
Jacksonian

The 1831 Tennessee gubernatorial election was held between August 4 and 5, 1831 in order to elect the Governor of Tennessee. Jacksonian nominee and incumbent Governor William Carroll won re-election against National Republican nominee John Ellis.

== General election ==
On election day, August 4, 1831, Democratic candidate William Carroll won re-election by a margin of 61,930 votes against National Republican nominee John Ellis, thereby retaining Democratic control over the office of Governor. Carroll was sworn in for his fifth overall term on October 1, 1831.

=== Results ===
Tennessee gubernatorial election, 1831
Party	Candidate	Votes	%
Democratic	William Carroll (incumbent)	63,694	97.03%
National Republican	John Ellis	1,764	2.69%
	Scattering	188	0.28%
Total votes		65,646	100.00%
Democratic hold			
