= 1827 Tennessee gubernatorial election =

- August 2–3, 1827
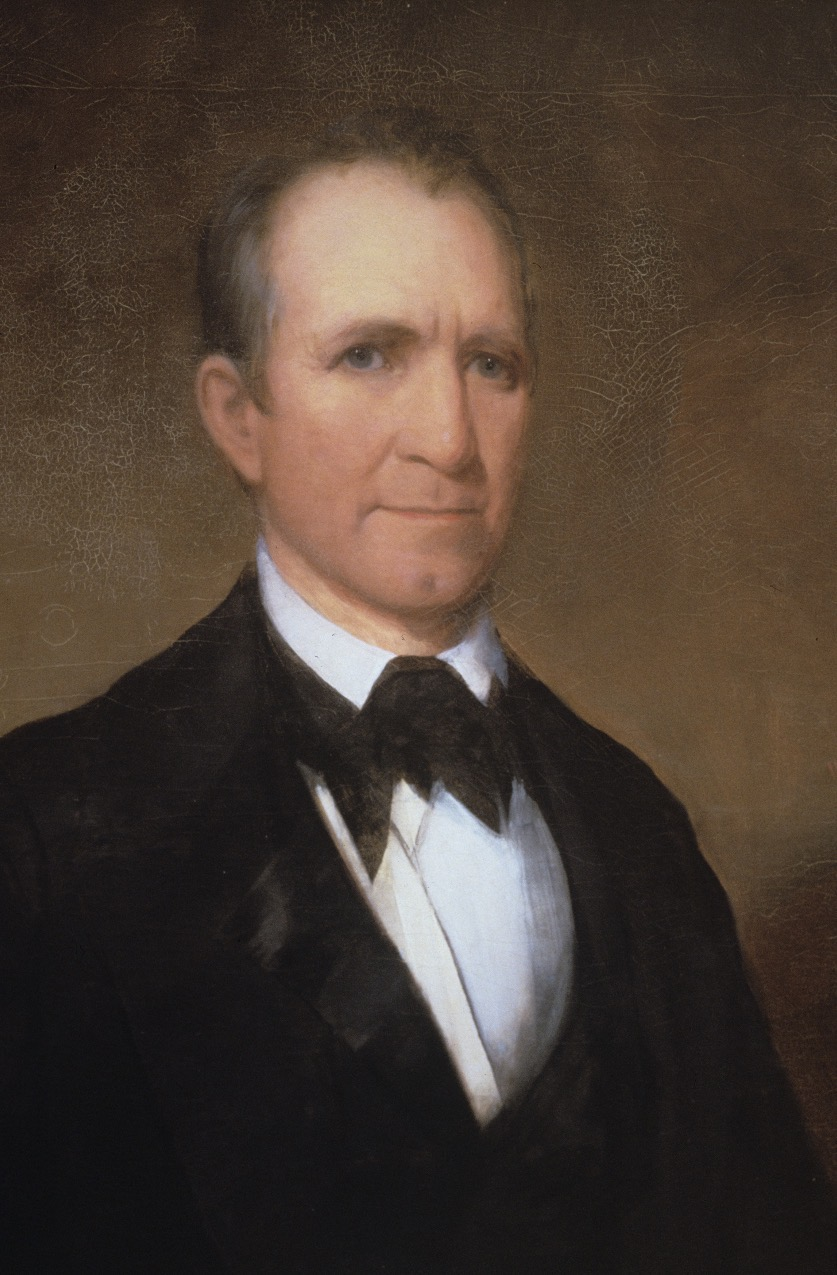

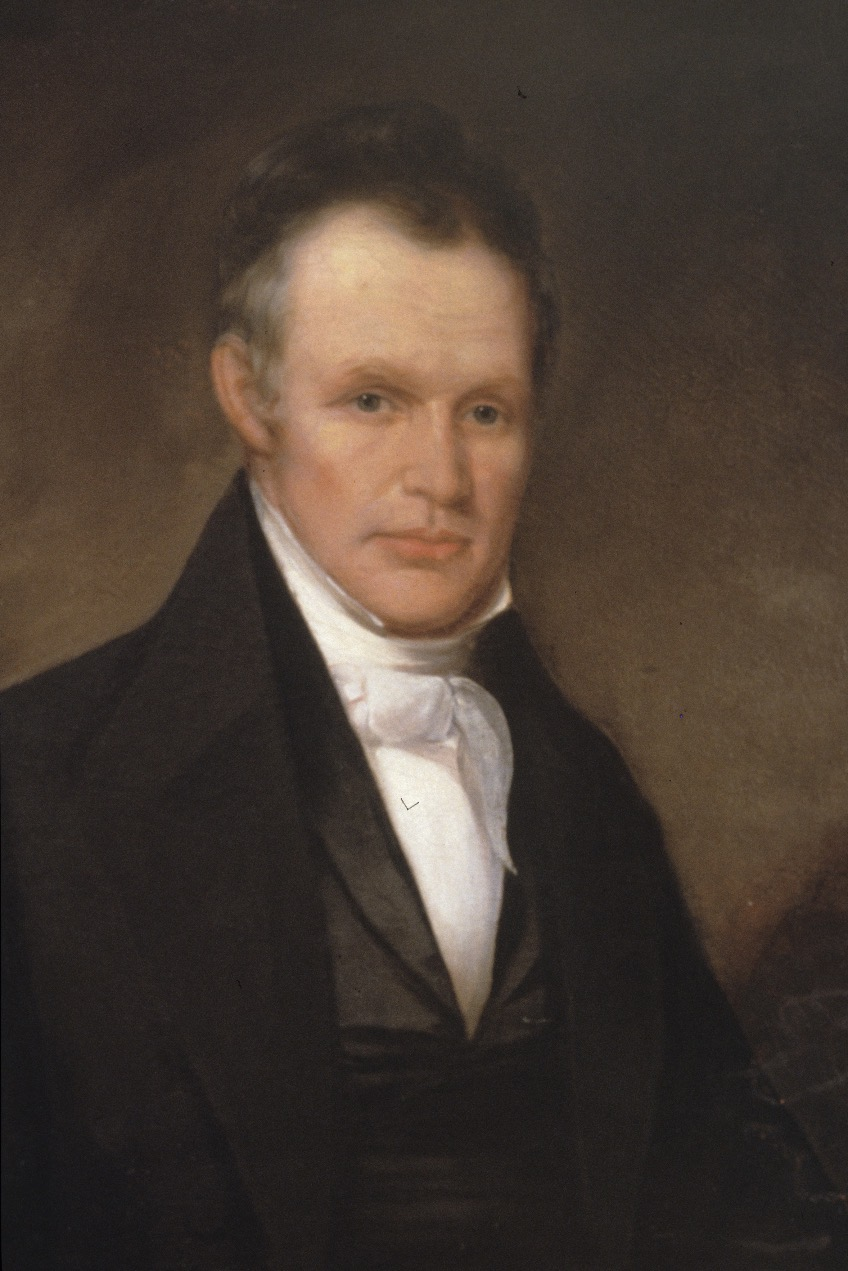

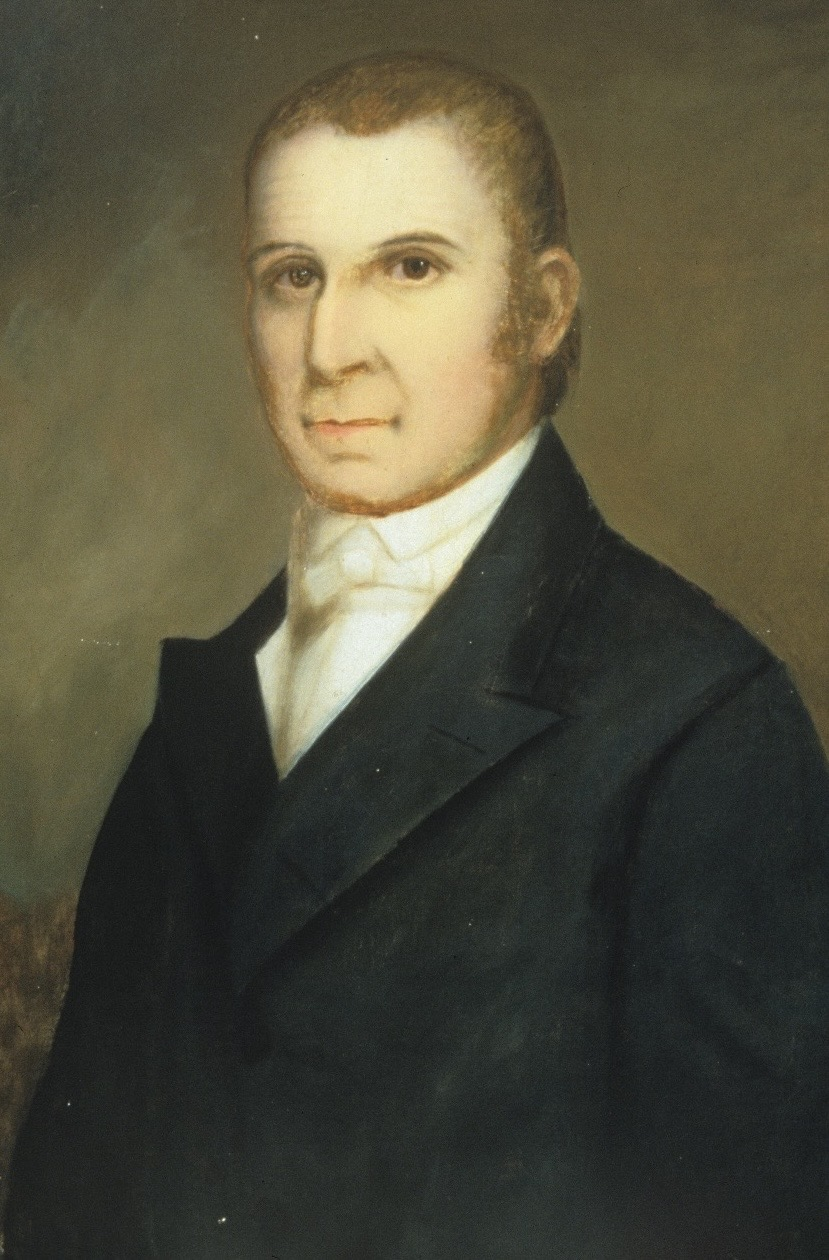
| Nominee | Sam Houston | Newton Cannon | Willie Blount |
| Party | Democratic | Democratic-Republican | Democratic-Republican |
| Popular vote | 44,243 | 32,929 | 1,784 |
| Percentage | 56.04% | 41.71% | 2.25% |
- County results Houston: 40–50% 50–60% 60–70% 70–80% 80–90% >90% Cannon 50–60% 60–70% 70–80% >90% Blount 40–50%
Governor before election
William Carroll
Democratic-Republican
Elected Governor
Sam Houston
Democratic

The 1827 Tennessee gubernatorial election was held between August 2 and 3, 1827 in order to elect the governor of Tennessee. Democratic candidate and former Jacksonian member of the U.S. House of Representatives from Tennessee's 7th district Sam Houston defeated Democratic-Republican candidate and former member of the U.S. House of Representatives from Tennessee's 5th district Newton Cannon and former Democratic-Republican governor Willie Blount.

== General election ==
On election day, August 2, 1827, Democratic candidate Sam Houston won the election by a margin of 11,314 votes against his foremost opponent and fellow Democratic-Republican candidate Newton Cannon, thereby gaining Democratic control over the office of governor. Houston was sworn in as the 6th governor of Tennessee on October 1, 1827.

=== Results ===
Tennessee gubernatorial election, 1827
| Party | Candidate | Votes | % |
|---|---|---|---|
| Democratic | Sam Houston | 44,243 | 56.04% |
| Democratic-Republican | Newton Cannon | 32,929 | 41.71% |
| Democratic-Republican | Willie Blount | 1,784 | 2.25% |
| Total votes | | 78,956 | 100.00 |
| Democratic gain from Democratic-Republican | | | |

== See also ==
- 1827 United States House of Representatives elections in Tennessee
- 1827 United States gubernatorial elections
