= Robert Armstrong (military officer) =

American military officer, consul, and Tennessee gubernatorial candidate (1792-1854)

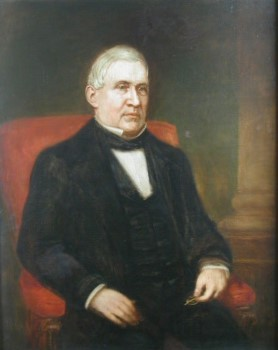
- Portrait of Armstrong by George Dury, c. 1850s
- Born: September 28, 1792; Abingdon, Virginia
- Died: February 23, 1854 (aged 61); Washington, D.C.
- Spouse: Margaret Nichol
- Military career
- Branch: United States Army
- Rank: Brigadier general
- Other work: United States consul to Liverpool

Robert Armstrong (September 28, 1792 – February 23, 1854) was an officer in the United States Army, a candidate for the position of Governor of Tennessee, and a United States consul to Liverpool.

== Early life ==
He was born in Abingdon, Virginia, in 1792.

== Career ==
He served as a sergeant in the Army during the War of 1812, and as a lieutenant of artillery under Andrew Jackson during the Creek War, getting wounded at the Battle of Enitachopco Creek in 1814, and served as a member of Jackson's staff at the Battle of New Orleans in 1815.

In 1829, he was named the postmaster of Nashville, Tennessee, and remained in that position through 1835. He was commissioned a brigadier general during the Second Seminole War during 1836 and 1837, and was engaged in the Battle of Wahoo Swamp. He was an unsuccessful candidate to be Governor of Tennessee in 1837.

In 1845, he was appointed consul in Liverpool, a position he remained in through 1849. In 1851, he became the owner of the Washington Union, in Washington, D.C. He remained in that position until his death in 1854 in Washington, D.C.

== Personal life ==
His father was Trooper Armstrong. He married Margaret Nichol in June 1814 and died in 1861. His buried at Nashville City Cemetery.

== Sources ==
- Ewing, Robert (1919). "Portrait of General Robert Armstrong". Tennessee Historical Magazine. 5 (2): 75–80. ISSN 2333-9012.
- Foreman, Carolyn Thomas (Autumn 1952). "The Armstrongs of Indian Territory" (PDF). Chronicles of Oklahoma. 30 (3). Oklahoma City: Oklahoma Historical Society: 292–308. ark:/67531/metadc1827488.
